= List of national treasures of Japan (writings: others) =

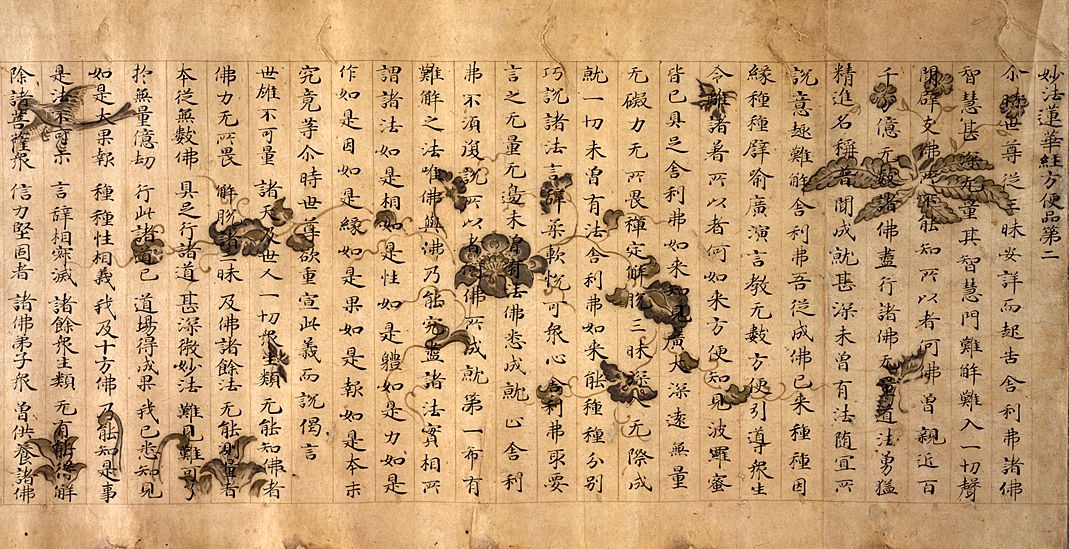
Part of the Chikubushima Sutra written on paper decorated with drawings of plants and animals

The term "national treasure" has been used in Japan to denote cultural properties since 1897, although the definition and the criteria have changed since the introduction of the term. The written materials in the list adhere to the current definition, and have been designated national treasures according to the Law for the Protection of Cultural Properties that came into effect on June 9, 1951. The items are selected by the Ministry of Education, Culture, Sports, Science and Technology based on their "especially high historical or artistic value". The list presents 107 entries from the Western Wei dynasty to the Meiji period with most dating to the period of Classical Japan and Mid-Imperial China from the 7th to 14th century. The total number of items is higher, however, since groups of related objects have been joined as single entries.

The list contains various types of written materials such as sutra copies, Buddhist commentaries and teachings, poetry and letters. Some of the designated objects originated in China, and were imported at a time when writing was being introduced to Japan. The items in this list were predominantly made with a writing brush on manuscript scrolls, which was the preferred medium until the advent of commercial printing and publishing in the 17th century. In many cases the manuscripts are noted examples of calligraphy. They are housed in temples, museums, libraries or archives, shrines, universities and in private collections. The writings in this list represent about half of the 237 national treasures in the category "writings". They are complemented by 72 Japanese and 58 Chinese book national treasures of the List of national treasures of Japan (writings: Japanese books) and the List of national treasures of Japan (writings: Chinese books).

== Statistics ==
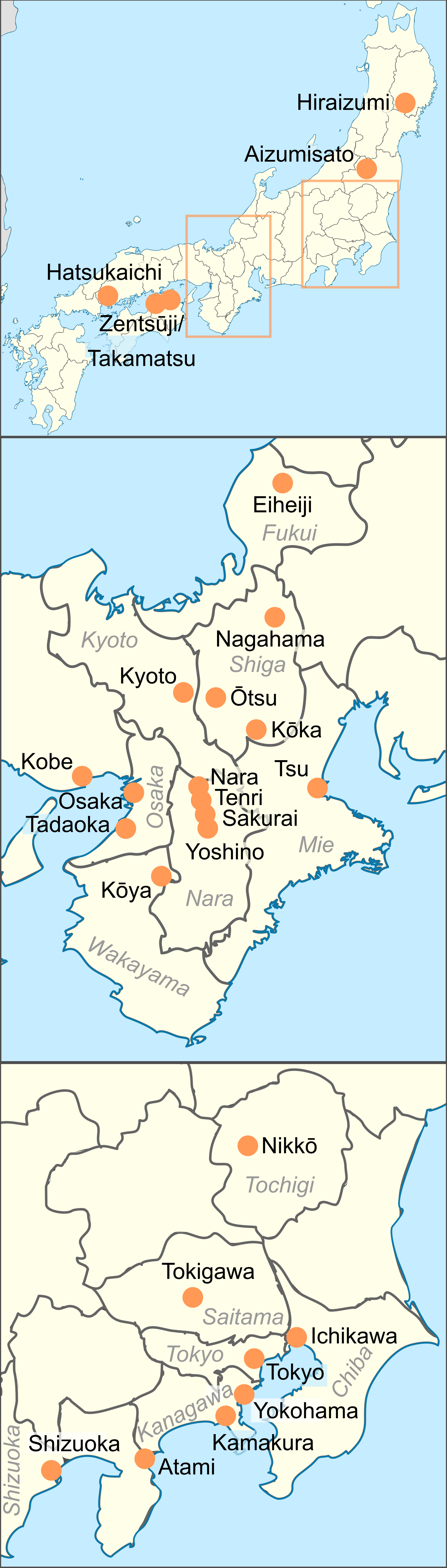
Map showing the location of non-book writings national treasures in Japan

Prefecture	City	National treasures
Chiba	Ichikawa	2
Fukui	Eiheiji	1
Fukushima	Aizumisato	1
Hiroshima	Hatsukaichi	1
Hyōgo	Kobe	2
Iwate	Hiraizumi	1
Kagawa	Takamatsu	1
Kagawa	Zentsūji	1
Kanagawa	Kamakura	3
Kanagawa	Yokohama	1
Kyoto	Kyoto	34
Mie	Tsu	2
Nara	Nara	6
Nara	Sakurai	1
Nara	Tenri	1
Nara	Yoshino	2
Osaka	Osaka	1
Osaka	Tadaoka	3
Saitama	Tokigawa	1
Shiga	Kōka	2
Shiga	Nagahama	1
Shiga	Ōtsu	3
Shizuoka	Atami	1
Shizuoka	Shizuoka	1
Tochigi	Nikkō	1
Tokyo	Tokyo	26
Wakayama	Kōya	7

Period (Note: Only the oldest period is counted, if a national treasure consists of items from more than one period.)	National treasures
Western Wei	1
Asuka period	2
Tang dynasty	6
Nara period	23
Heian period	33
Northern Song dynasty	1
Goryeo	1
Southern Song dynasty	15
Kamakura period	18
Yuan dynasty	5
Nanboku-chō period	2

== Usage ==
The table's columns (except for Remarks and Image) are sortable pressing the arrows symbols. The following gives an overview of what is included in the table and how the sorting works.

- Name: the name as registered in the Database of National Cultural Properties
- Authors: name of the author(s)
- Remarks: information about the type of document and its content
- Date: period and year; The column entries sort by year. If only a period is known, they sort by the start year of that period.
- Format: principal type, technique and dimensions; The column entries sort by the main type: scroll (includes handscrolls and letters), book (includes albums, ordinary bound books and books bound by fukuro-toji) (Note: (袋とじ) binding folded uncut pages in a book, so that there are two blank pages between two pages outside) and other (includes hanging scrolls)
- Present location: "temple/museum/shrine-name town-name prefecture-name"; The column entries sort as "prefecture-name town-name".
- Image: picture of the manuscript or of a characteristic document in a group of manuscripts

== Treasures ==
=== Buddhist writings ===
==== Sutras ====
The concept of writing came to Japan from the Korean kingdom of Baekje in the form of classical Chinese books and sutras, likely written on paper and in the form of manuscript rolls (kansubon). This probably happened at the beginning of the 5th century (around 400), and certainly in conjunction with the introduction of Buddhism in the 6th century. The increasing popularity of Buddhism, strongly promoted by Prince Shōtoku (574–622), in the late-6th century and early-7th century was one of the factors (Note: The other factor was the establishment of a bureaucratic Chinese-style government in Japan around the same time) leading to a rise in the importance of writing. Buddhism required the study of sutras in Chinese. To satisfy the growing demand for them, imported Sui and Tang manuscripts were copied, first by Korean and Chinese immigrants, and later in the mid-7th century by Japanese scribes. The Sangyō Gisho ("Annotated Commentaries on the Three Sutras"), traditionally attributed to Prince Shōtoku, is the oldest extant Japanese text of any length. By 673 the entire Buddhist canon had been systematically copied. Not a single sutra survives from before the end of the 6th century. The oldest extant complete sutra copied in Japan dates to 686 and has been designated a national treasure. During the 7th and 8th centuries, the copying of Buddhist texts, including sutras, dominated writing. Few Chinese secular or local Japanese works (which were rare) were copied. The state founded a Sutra Copying Bureau (shakyōjo) before 727 (Note: Probably much before this date.) with highly specialized calligraphers, proofreaders and metal polishers to satisfy the large demand for Buddhist texts. Sutra copying was not only for duplication but also to acquire religious merit; thus nearly all Buddhist texts were hand-copied during the 8th century despite knowledge of printing.

The peak of sutra copying occurred in the Nara period at which time the Great Perfection of Wisdom (Daihannya) sutra and the Lotus Sutra were the sutras most often copied. Most of the sutras were written in black ink on paper dyed pale yellow. (Note: The traditional Chinese way to prevent insect damage.) However, some were made with gold or silver ink on indigo, purple or other colored paper—particularly the ones that were produced in 741 when Emperor Shōmu decreed Konkōmyō Saishōō sutras written in gold letters be distributed among provincial temples. Many sutra copies contain a colophon with the name of the sponsor—often somebody from the ruling class—and the reason of copying, usually related to the health or salvation of people or the state.

After the shakyōjo closed at the end of the 8th century, the imperial family and leading aristocrats continued to sponsor sutra copying. Because of an enhanced belief in the powers of the Lotus Sutra, more Heian period copies of this sutra exist than of all other sutras combined. Starting in the early Heian period, styles became flowery and ornate with lavish decorations as sutras were not used only in recitation but for dedication and sacrifice. Devotional sutra copying was more often undertaken by the initiator than in the Nara period. New forms of decoration came in fashion by the early-11th century including placing each character in the outline of a stupa, on lotus pedestals or next to depictions of Boddhisattvas. Sutras were increasingly furnished with frontispieces starting in the 11th century. Calligraphy shifted from Chinese to Japanese style. Sutra copying continued into the Kamakura and subsequent periods, but only rarely to comparable artistic effect. With the import of printed Song editions in the Kamakura period, hand-copying of the complete scriptures died out and sutra copying was only practiced for its devotional aspect. Fifty-one sutras or sets of sutras from the 6th century Western Wei to 14th century Nanboku-chō period have been designated national treasures. Some of the oldest items in this list originated in China.

Name	Authors	Remarks	Date	Format	Present location	Image
Segment of the Sutra of the Wise and Foolish (賢愚経残巻, Kengukyō zankan), Yamato edition	attributed to Emperor Shōmu	Chapters 8 ("Vajra, the Daughter of King Prasenajit"), 9 ("Golden Wealth"), 10 ("Heavenly Flowers"), 11 ("Heavenly Jewels"), and the final lines of Chapter 48 ("Upagupta") of the Sutra of the Wise and Foolish, or Sutra of the Karma of the Wise and Foolish; total of 262 lines with eleven to fourteen characters per line; also known as Great Shōmu (大聖武, ōshōmu) after Emperor Shōmu; originally kept at Tōdai-ji in Yamato	Nara period, 8th century	One handscroll, ink on paper, 25.7 cm × 696.9 cm (10.1 in × 274.4 in)	Tokyo National Museum, Tokyo	
Segment of the Sutra of the Wise and Foolish (賢愚経残巻, Kengukyō zankan)	attributed to Emperor Shōmu	Volumes 1 (419 lines), 2 (149 lines), 3 (18 lines); also known as Great Shōmu (大聖武, ōshōmu) after Emperor Shōmu	Nara period, 8th century	Three handscrolls, ink on paper	Maeda Ikutokukai, Tokyo	—
Segment of the Sutra of the Wise and Foolish (賢愚経残巻, Kengukyō zankan)	attributed to Emperor Shōmu	Volumes 1 (461 lines), 2 (503 lines); also known as Great Shōmu (大聖武, ōshōmu) after Emperor Shōmu; formerly in the possession of Kaidan-in, Tōdai-ji	Nara period, 8th century	Two handscrolls, ink on paper, 27.5 cm × 1,200 cm (10.8 in × 472.4 in)	Hakutsuru Fine Art Museum, Kobe, Hyōgo	
Lotus Sutra, Chapter on "Expedient Means" (法華経方便品, Hokekyō hōbenbon)	attributed to Minamoto Toshifusa (源俊房) by Shōkadō Shōjō in a postscript from 1625	28 lines per page; also known as Chikubushima Sutra (竹生島経) as the scroll is in possession of Hōgon-ji on Chikubu Island; paper decorated with gold and silver underdrawings of butterflies, birds, flowering plants, imaginary Buddhist flowers, and clouds; the introductory chapter of the same work, located at Hōgon-ji, has been designated as a national treasure	Heian period, 10th century	One handscroll, ink on decorated paper, 29.6 cm × 528.5 cm (11.7 in × 208.1 in)	Tokyo National Museum, Tokyo	
Lotus Sutra in minute characters (細字法華経, saiji hokekyō)	transcription by Li Yuanhui (李元恵, rigenkei)	39 pages of 56 ruled lines with 32 characters per line; also known as Honored Companion Sutra (御同朋経, godōbōkyō); handed down at Hōryū-ji	Tang dynasty, 694	One handscroll, ink on paper; 25.7 cm × 2,150 cm (10.1 in × 846.5 in)	Tokyo National Museum, Tokyo	
Commentary on the Vimalakirti Sutra (浄名玄論, jōmyō genron)	unknown	Oldest extant text using the Japanese dating system; 20 to 40 characters per line; originally in the possession of Tōdai-ji	Asuka period, 706 (Note: Later additions in the Heian and Kamakura periods to some of the volumes)	Eight handscrolls, ink on paper, height: 27.8–28.0 cm (10.9–11.0 in), length: 296.0–1,092.0 cm (116.5–429.9 in)	Kyoto National Museum, Kyoto	
Mahāratnakūṭa Sūtra on deep blue paper (紺紙金字大宝積経, konshikinji taihō shakukyō) vol. 32, Goryeo Tripiṭaka with gilt letters (高麗国金字大蔵経, kōraikoku kinji daizōkyō)	Choi Sung-sak	Earliest copied sutra of the Goryeo dynasty and only surviving volume of a set of complete Buddhist scriptures, offered by Queen Heonae and Kim Chi-yang. The cover is decorated with a hōsōge flower pattern and the frontispiece with three bodhisattvas scattering flower offerings, both in silver paint.	One handscroll, gilt letters on deep blue paper, 29.1 cm × 881.2 cm (11.5 in × 346.9 in)	Goryeo, 1006	custody of Kyoto National Museum, Kyoto, Kyoto; owned by National Institutes for Cultural Heritage	Deep blue paper with Chinese characters and line drawings of bodhisattvas and floral motives.
Segment of the Sutra of the Incantation of the one thousand armed, one thousand eyed Avalokiteśvara Bodhisattva (千手千眼陀羅尼経残巻, senju sengen daranikyō zankan)	Genbō (玄昉)	Only extant portion of one thousand copies of the Senju sengen daranikyō made by Genbō; mentioned in the Essential Records of Tōdai-ji (東大寺要録, tōdaiji yōroku); total of 109 lines; beginning of scroll is lost	Nara period, 741	One handscroll, ink on paper, 25.5 cm × 246.0 cm (10.0 in × 96.9 in)	Kyoto National Museum, Kyoto	
Golden Light of the Most Victorious Kings Sutra (紫紙金字金光明最勝王経, shishikinji konkōmyō saishōōkyō)	unknown (Sutra Copying Bureau)	One of the sutras enshrined in the state-sponsored "Temples for the Protection of the State by the Golden Light (of the) Four Heavenly Kings"; said to have been enshrined in Bingo Province	Nara period, 8th century, Tenpyō era after 741	Ten handscrolls, gilt letters on violet paper, 26.4 cm × 841.1 cm (10.4 in × 331.1 in) (vol. 1)	Nara National Museum, Nara, Nara	
Dhāraṇī of the Adamantine Place (金剛場陀羅尼経, Kongō Jōdaranikyō)	transcription by the priest Hōrin	Oldest hand-copied sutra in Japan	Asuka period, 686	One handscroll, ink on paper	Agency for Cultural Affairs, Tokyo	Nine lines of text in Chinese script. Four lines of text in Chinese script, broken by spaces.
Sutra on deep blue paper from the Kinpusen sutra mound (金峯山経塚出土紺紙金字経, kinpusen kyōzuka konshikinji kyō)	Fujiwara no Michinaga, Fujiwara no Moromichi	79 papers	Heian period, 10th—11th century	One handscroll,	Kinpusen-ji, Yoshino, Nara	—
Sutra on deep blue paper from the Kinpusen sutra mound (金峯山経塚出土紺紙金字経, kinpusen kyōzuka konshikinji kyō)	Fujiwara no Michinaga, Fujiwara no Moromichi	200 papers	Heian period, 10th—11th century	One handscroll,	Kinpusen-ji, Yoshino, Nara	—
Konkōmyō Saishōō Sutra with gilt letters (紫紙金字金光明最勝王経, shishikinji konkōmyō saishōōkyō)	unknown (Sutra Copying Bureau)	One of the sutras enshrined in the state-sponsored "Temples for the Protection of the State by the Golden Light (of the) Four Heavenly Kings" founded by Emperor Shōmu	Nara period, 8th century	Ten handscrolls	Reihōkan (owned by Ryūkō-in (龍光院)), Kōya, Wakayama	—
Mahavairocana Sutra (大毘盧遮那成仏神変加持経, Daibirushana jōbutsu jinpen kajikyō)	unknown	—	Heian period	Seven handscrolls, width: 27.6 cm (10.9 in), length: 56.0–1,386.1 cm (22.0–545.7 in)	Saidai-ji, Nara, Nara	
Great Perfection of Wisdom Sutra (大般若経, Daihannya-kyō) or Yakushi-ji Sutra (薬師寺経, Yakushiji-kyō)	various (ten-odd people)	Formerly in the possession of Yakushi-ji	Nara period, 8th century	387 handscrolls, ink on paper, height: 27.3 cm (10.7 in)	Fujita Art Museum, Osaka	
Great Perfection of Wisdom Sutra (大般若経, Daihannya-kyō)	unknown	Made on request of Prince Nagaya praying for the deceased Emperor Mommu	Nara period, 712	27 bound books	Jōmyō-ji (常明寺), Kōka, Shiga	—
Great Perfection of Wisdom Sutra (大般若経, Daihannya-kyō)	unknown	Made on request of Prince Nagaya praying for the deceased Emperor Mommu; oldest extant manuscript of the Great Perfection of Wisdom Sutra	Nara period, 712	142 bound books	Taihei-ji (太平寺), Kōka, Shiga	
Konkōmyō Saishōō Sutra (金光明最勝王経, Konkōmyō Saishōōkyō)	unknown	—	Nara period, 762	Ten handscrolls, 32.4 cm × 803.0 cm (12.8 in × 316.1 in)	Saidai-ji, Nara, Nara	
Konpon hyakuichi konma (根本百一羯磨) vol. 6	unknown	Transcription of a Chinese translation from 703, 12–13 characters per line	Nara period, 8th century	One handscroll, ink on paper, 27.4 cm × 1,164.9 cm (10.8 in × 458.6 in)	Nezu Art Museum, Tokyo	
Sutra of the Wise and Foolish (賢愚経, kengukyō) vol. 15	unknown	467 lines	Nara period, 8th century	One handscroll, ink on paper	Tōdai-ji, Nara, Nara	
Lotus Sutra in large characters (大字法華経, daiji hokekyō)	unknown	Volume three missing	Nara period, 8th century	Seven handscrolls, ink on paper	Reihōkan (owned by Ryūkō-in (龍光院)), Kōya, Wakayama	—
Fukū Kenjaku Shinpen Shingon Sutra (不空羂索神変真言経, fukū kenjaku shinpen shingonkyō)	unknown	—	Nara period, 8th century	18 handscrolls	Reihōkan (owned by Sanbō-in (三宝院)), Kōya, Wakayama	—
Buddhist Monastic Traditions of Southern Asia (南海寄帰内法伝, nankai kiki naihōden) vols. 1,2	unknown	Oldest extant manuscript of this work; handed down in Ishiyama-dera	Nara period, 8th century	One handscroll, ink on paper, vol. 1: 26.5 cm × 885 cm (10.4 in × 348.4 in), vol. 2: 26.5 cm × 1,010 cm (10.4 in × 397.6 in)	custody of Tenri University Library (天理大学附属天理図書館, Tenri daigaku fuzoku Tenri toshokan) (owned by Tenri University), Tenri, Nara	
Lotus Sutra on deep blue paper (紺紙金字法華経, konshikinji hokekyō) and Samantabhadra Contemplation Sutra on deep blue paper (紺紙金字観普賢経, konshikinji kanfugenkyō)	Taira no Kiyomori and his younger brother Yorimori	First couple of lines of each scroll transcribed by Taira no Kiyomori, following lines by Yorimori; therefore also called (両筆経; lit. Sutra written together)	Heian period, 1170–1172	Seven handscrolls (Lotus Sutra) and one handscroll (Samantabhadra Contemplation Sutra), gilt letters on deep blue paper	Itsukushima Shrine, Hatsukaichi, Hiroshima	
Instruction manual of the Nirvana Sutra (大般涅槃経集解, Daihatsu nehankyō shūge)	unknown	Scrolls 11 to 69 of a 71 scroll manuscript; formerly in the possession of Tenkai, handed down in Rinnō-ji	Nara period (43 scrolls) and Heian period (16 scrolls)	59 handscrolls, ink on paper	Rinnō-ji, Nikkō, Tochigi	
Instruction manual of the Nirvana Sutra (大般涅槃経集解, Daihatsu nehankyō shūge)	unknown	Centered around a 54 scroll sutra edition from the Tang period to which 17 scrolls were added during the Kamakura – Edo period	Nara period – Edo period	71 handscrolls, ink on paper	Hakutsuru Fine Art Museum, Kobe, Hyōgo	—
Complete Buddhist scriptures in gold and silver letters (金銀字一切経, kinginji issaikyō) or Chūson-ji Sutras (中尊寺経, Chūson-ji kyō)	unknown	Large-scale collection of sutras, Buddhist regulations and sutra explanations initiated by Fujiwara no Kiyohira; dedicated to Chūson-ji and later presented to Kongōbu-ji by Toyotomi Hidetsugu; decorated with various pictures in gold and silver paint; a set of 15 similar scrolls that were part of the same collection remained at Chūson-ji and are a national treasure	Heian period, February 1117 – March 1126	4,296 handscrolls, gold and silver letters on indigo blue paper	Reihōkan (owned by Kongōbu-ji), Kōya, Wakayama	
Complete Buddhist scriptures on deep blue paper with gilt letters (紺紙金字一切経, konshikonji issaikyō) or Chūson-ji Sutras (中尊寺経, Chūson-ji kyō)	unknown	Large-scale collection of sutras, Buddhist regulations and sutra explanations initiated by Fujiwara no Kiyohira; dedicated to Chūson-ji; each scroll's end page is decorated with a drawing in gold paint; 15 scrolls with alternating gold and silver letters are part of a set of up to 5,300 scrolls most of which are now in the possession of Kongōbu-ji and a national treasure	Heian period, February 1117 – March 1126	2,739 handscrolls, of which 15 are with gold and silver letters and 2,724 in gilt letters on indigo blue paper	Daichōju-in (大長寿院) (Chūson-ji), Hiraizumi, Iwate	
Preface to the Lotus Sutra decorated with Buddhas (一字一仏法華経序品, ichiji ichibutsu hokekyō johon)	Kūkai	Next to each character there is an image of a Bodhisattva in-between the lines said to be drawn by Kūkai's mother, Tamayori Gozen (玉依御前)	Heian period	One handscroll, length: 21.2 m (70 ft)	Zentsū-ji, Zentsūji, Kagawa	
Lotus pedestal character Lotus Sutra (一字蓮台法華経, ichijirendai hokekyō) or The Encouragements of Bodhisattva Fugen (普賢勧発品, Fugen kanbotsubon)	unknown	Below each character a lotus flower is drawn thereby equating each character with the Bodhisattva; endpapers decorated with an inside scene of a Buddhist memorial service in blown away roof technique (吹抜屋台, fukinuki yatai)	late Heian period	One handscroll, ink on paper decorated with gold and silver dust and foil	custody of Yamato Bunkakan, Nara, Nara; owned by Kintetsu Corporation	
Lotus pedestal character Lotus Sutra (一字蓮台法華経, ichijirendai hokekyō)	unknown	Below each character a lotus flower is drawn just like Bodhisattvas are often depicted on a lotus pedestal; volume 6 missing	Heian period	Nine handscrolls, ink on paper	Ryūkō-ji (龍興寺), Aizumisato, Fukushima	
Lotus Sutra (法華経, hokekyō) (prefatory sutra (開結共, kaiketsutomo))	unknown	—	Heian period, 11th century	Ten handscrolls, ink on decorative paper with five-colored design	Sensō-ji, Tokyo	
Lotus Sutra (法華経, hokekyō) or Kunōji Sutra (久能寺経, Kunōjikyō)	Emperor Toba and others	Part of 30 scrolls (28 chapters of the Lotus Sutra plus introduction and postscript).	Heian period, 12th century	4 handscrolls, ink on decorated paper, 26.7 cm × 196.4 cm (10.5 in × 77.3 in)	private, Tokyo	
Lotus Sutra (法華経, hokekyō) or Kunōji Sutra (久能寺経, Kunōjikyō)	Fujiwara clan	Originally offered to Anrakuji-in on occasion of Emperor Toba entering priesthood, later transferred to Kunōji. Part of 30 scrolls (28 chapters of the Lotus Sutra plus introduction and postscript).	Heian period, 12th century	19 handscrolls, ink on decorated paper	Tesshū-ji (鉄舟寺), Shizuoka, Shizuoka	
Lotus Sutra (法華経, hokekyō) vol. 6	unknown	—	Heian period	One handscroll, ink on colored paper	Reihōkan (owned by Kongōbu-ji), Kōya, Wakayama	—
Lotus Sutra (法華経, hokekyō)	Unkei	Part of an eight scroll set, scroll 1 has been lost and scroll 8 is in private hand and a national treasure; Unkei was supported by a female sponsor named Akomaro (阿古丸)	Heian period, 1183	Six handscrolls, ink on paper	Shinshōgokuraku-ji, Kyoto	
Complete Buddhist scriptures, Song edition (宋版一切経, sōhan issaikyō)	unknown	Contains an inscription dated 1198.	Southern Song	6102 bound books, woodblock prints, 29.6 cm × 11.7 cm (11.7 in × 4.6 in)	Daigo-ji, Kyoto	
Lotus Sutra (法華経, hokekyō) vol. 8	Unkei	Part of an eight scroll set, scroll 1 has been lost and scrolls 2 to 7 are located at Shinshōgokuraku-ji and a national treasure; includes a postscript explaining the circumstances of the sutra transcription; Unkei was supported by a female sponsor named Akomaro (阿古丸)	Heian period, 1183	One handscroll, ink on paper	private, Tokyo	
Lotus Sutra (法華経一品経, hokekyō ipponkyō), Amitabha Sutra (阿弥陀経, amidakyō) and Heart Sutra (般若心経, hannyashinkyō)	unknown	Also called Jikō-ji Sutras (慈光寺経, Jikō-ji kyō)	Kamakura period	33 handscrolls, ink on paper decorated with gold and silver dust and foil	Jikō-ji, Tokigawa, Saitama	
Lotus Sutra (法華経, hokekyō), Samantabhadra Contemplation Sutra (観普賢経, kanfugenkyō), Sutra of Immeasurable Meanings (無量義経, muryōgikyō), Amitabha Sutra (阿弥陀経, amidakyō) and Heart Sutra (般若心経, hannyashinkyō)	unknown	Also called Hase-dera Sutras (長谷寺経, Hase-dera kyō); endpapers decorated with richly colored paintings on gold ground using ultramarine, verdigris, gold and silver paint and scarlet red	early Kamakura period	34 handscrolls: 28 Lotus Sutra, 1 Samantabhadra Contemplation Sutra, 3 Sutra of Immeasurable Meanings, 1 Amitabha Sutra, 1 Heart Sutra, ink on paper decorated with mist and clouds in gold and silver foil, width: 28.5 cm (11.2 in)	Hase-dera, Sakurai, Nara	
Maharatnakuta Sutra (宝積経要品, hōshakukyō yōhon)	Musō Soseki	—	Nanboku-chō period	One bound book, ink on paper, 31.5 cm × 10.5 cm (12.4 in × 4.1 in)	Maeda Ikutokukai, Tokyo	
Kegon Sutra, Kanji meaning and reading (花厳経音義, kegonkyō ongi)	unknown	Collection of difficult to interpret Chinese words showing their Japanese pronunciation and meaning in Man'yōgana; only extant manuscript	Heian period, 794	Two handscrolls, ink on paper	Agency for Cultural Affairs, Tokyo	
Sutra of the Bodhisattva's Dwelling in the Womb (菩薩処胎経, bosatsu shotaikyō)	unknown	Sutra on Buddha entering nirvana; first scroll is a transcription from the late Heian period, fifth scroll a transcription from the Nara period; remaining three scrolls contain a postscriptum from 550	Western Wei, 550	Five handscrolls, ink on paper	Chion-in, Kyoto	
Dairōtankyō (大楼炭経) vol. 3	unknown	Sutra on the occurrence of heaven on earth	Tang dynasty, 673	One book bound by fukuro-toji	Chion-in, Kyoto	—
Konkōmyō Saishōō Sutra in minute characters (細字金光明最勝王経, saiji konkōmyō saishōōkyō)	unknown	34 characters per line instead of the usual 17	Nara period, 710	Two handscrolls, ink on paper	Reihōkan (owned by Ryūkō-in (龍光院)), Kōya, Wakayama	—
Shaku makaenron (釈摩訶衍論)	unknown	Commentary on the Awakening of Faith (大乗起信論, daijō kishinron); one of the principal books of Shingon Buddhism; lower part of opening phrase of volume one features Chinese characters of Empress Wu	Tang dynasty, 618	Five bound books, ink on paper	Ishiyama-dera, Ōtsu, Shiga	—
Diamond Sutra (金剛経, kongōkyō)	Zhang Jizhi (張即之)	—	Southern Song, 1253	One bound book, ink on paper, 32.2 cm × 1,781.0 cm (12.7 in × 701.2 in)	Chishaku-in, Kyoto	
Biography of the Sixth Patriarch (六祖恵能伝, rokusoenōden)	unknown	Brought back from China by Saichō	Tang dynasty, 803	One handscroll, ink on paper, 26.1 cm × 38.1 cm (10.3 in × 15.0 in)	Enryaku-ji, Ōtsu, Shiga	—
Diamond Sutra written by Daikaku Zenshi (大覚禅師筆金剛経, Daikaku Zenshi-hitsu kongōkyō)	Lanxi Daolong	—	Southern Song, 13th century	One bound book	Ryūkō-in (龍光院), Kyoto	—
Preface to the Lotus Sutra (法華経序品, hokekyō johon) or Chikubushima Sutra (竹生島経, Chikubushimakyō)	attributed to Minamoto Toshifusa (源俊房) by Shōkadō Shōjō in a postscript from 1625	28 lines per page; paper decorated with gold and silver underdrawings of butterflies, birds, flowering plants, imaginary Buddhist flowers, and clouds; the Expedient Means chapter of the same work, located at the Tokyo National Museum, has been designated as national treasure	Heian period, 11th century	One bound accordion book, ink on decorated paper, 26.3 cm × 481.5 cm (10.4 in × 189.6 in)	Hōgon-ji, Nagahama, Shiga	
Sutra of Immeasurable Meanings (無量義経, muryōgikyō) and Samantabhadra Contemplation Sutra (観普賢経, kanfugenkyō) or Ornamental sutra (裝飾経)	unknown	Thought to have formed a set together with the Lotus sutra	Heian period, 11th century	Two handscrolls, one each, ink on paper dyed in different shades of brown, muryōgikyō: 25.2 cm × 927.9 cm (9.9 in × 365.3 in), kanfugenkyō: 25.4 cm × 845.8 cm (10.0 in × 333.0 in)	Nezu Art Museum, Tokyo	

==== Treatises, commentaries ====
Nara period Buddhism was dominated by six state-controlled sects. They were introduced from the mainland and centred around the ancient capitals in Asuka and Nara. These schools were generally academic in nature, closely connected with the court and represented a doctrine that was far removed from the daily life of the people. In 804, two Japanese monks Kūkai and Saichō travelled to China; on their return they established Tendai and Shingon Buddhism respectively. Unlike their predecessors both esoteric schools took into account the needs of the common people. Though their origins lay in China, with time they acquired local Japanese traits. Generally the 9th century was a time when Chinese learning thrived in Japan. Authors produced a wide variety of works in Chinese language, including commentaries and treatises on a variety of subjects.

A number of new sects appeared in Japan in the 12th and 13th centuries as a natural reaction to the difficult teachings of older schools and partially motivated by the notion of mappō. (Note: For this reason these new schools have been termed "evangelist" by Sir George Bailey Sansom.) Growing out of an Amida cult, the Jōdo Shinshū Pure Land school was founded in 1224 by Shinran, and attracted a following from all classes and occupations. Three years later, Dōgen introduced the Sōtō school of Zen Buddhism emphasizing meditation and dharma practice. The first truly Japanese school of Buddhism goes back to Nichiren's proclamation of his teachings in 1253. Nichiren Buddhism was exceptional for being militant and intolerant. The central focus of Nichiren's teaching was the veneration of the Lotus Sutra.

Fourteen treatises and commentaries of famous Japanese monks dating from the early Heian to the Kamakura period have been designated as national treasures. These include three commentaries by Kūkai on two of the main mantras (Dainichikyō and Kongōhannyakyō) of Shingon Buddhism, works by Shinran discussing Pure Land Buddhism, mappō and Amida, a manual on zazen "seated meditation" by Dōgen and two works by Nichiren related to his teachings. In addition two large scale collection of documents from the Nara to the Meiji period are listed here as national treasures.

Name	Authors	Remarks	Date	Format	Present location	Image
Buddhist Sutras at Shōmyō-ji; Documents of Kanazawa Bunko (称名寺聖教 金沢文庫文書, shōmyōji shōgyō kanazawa bunko monjo)	—	—	Heian period to Meiji period, 12th–19th century	16,692 (Shōmyō-ji) and 4,149 (Kanazawa Bunko) items	Shōmyō-ji and Kanazawa Bunko, Yokohama, Kanagawa	—
Thirty booklets of handcopied sutras (三十帖冊子, sanjūjō sasshi) and Sutra Box with Auspicious Floral Motif and Kalavinkas (宝相華迦陵頻伽蒔絵𡑮冊子箱（𡑮＝土篇に「塞」）, hōsōgekaryōga makie sokusasshi bako)	Kūkai	Sutras brought back from his 804 visit to Hui-kuo at China by Kūkai; box presented to Tō-ji by Emperor Daigo; originally there were 38 books, 8 of which have been lost	Heian period, 9th century; box from 919	30 bound books and one box	Ninna-ji, Kyoto	
Teachings of the monk Shunyū (淳祐内供筆聖経, shunyū naiku hitsu shōgyō) or Fragrant teachings (薫聖経, nioi no shōgyō)	Shunyū/Junyū (淳祐)	—	Heian period, 10th century	60 scrolls, one bound book	Ishiyama-dera, Ōtsu, Shiga	
Segment of the Kongōhannyakyō Sutra Commentary (金剛般若経開題残巻, Kongōhannyakyō kaidai zankan)	Kūkai	Segment of a commentary explaining the title of the Diamond Sutra. The full commentary was originally located in Sanbō-in before being cut in segments	Heian period, 9th century	One handscroll, ink on Japanese tissue paper, 38 lines, 28.1 cm × 131.8 cm (11.1 in × 51.9 in)	Nara National Museum, Nara, Nara	
Collection of documents and Buddhist sutras at Daigo-ji (醍醐寺文書聖教, Daigo-ji monjo seikyō)	—	Written materials including sacred teachings and documents. The items comprise the ancestral heritage of Daigo-ji	Nara period to Meiji period, 8th–19th century	69,378 items, ink on paper	Daigo-ji, Kyoto	
Segment of the Kongōhannyakyō Sutra commentary (金剛般若経開題残巻, Kongōhannyakyō kaidai zankan)	Kūkai	Segment of a commentary explaining the title of the Diamond Sutra. The full commentary was originally located in Sanbō-in before being cut in segments. Considered to be a draft	Heian period, 9th century	One handscroll, ink on paper, 63 lines, 27.6 cm × 202.4 cm (10.9 in × 79.7 in)	Kyoto National Museum, Kyoto	
Great Sun Sutra commentary (大日経開題, Dainichikyō kaidai)	Kūkai	—	early Heian period	One scroll	Daigo-ji, Kyoto	—
Rōkoshiiki (聾瞽指帰) or Sangō Shiiki	Kūkai	Comparative study of Confucianism, Taoism and Buddhism	Heian period, 797	Two scrolls, ink on paper, 28.3 cm × 1,011 cm (11.1 in × 398.0 in) (18 pages) and 28.3 cm × 1,176 cm (11.1 in × 463.0 in) (21 pages)	Reihōkan (owned by Kongōbu-ji), Kōya, Wakayama	
The object of devotion for observing the mind in the fifth five-hundred year period (観心本尊抄, Kanjin no Honzon Shō)	Nichiren	Explanation of the object of devotion in Nichiren's teaching and description of the practice for attaining Buddhahood; addressed to Toki Jonin, one of Nichiren's followers	Kamakura period, December 8, 1273	One bound book, ink on paper, 17 pages: pages 1–12 33.0 cm × 54.2 cm (13.0 in × 21.3 in), pages 13–17 30.3 cm × 45.5 cm (11.9 in × 17.9 in)	Hokekyō-ji, Ichikawa, Chiba	
Treatise on securing the peace of the land through the establishment of the correct teaching (立正安国論, Risshō Ankoku Ron) or "On establishing the correct teaching for the peace of the land"	Nichiren	In this writing Nichiren aims to clarify the cause of a large number of natural disasters such as famines, floods, landslides and earthquakes that troubled Japan and Kamakura around the 1250s. His conclusion is that people should embrace the correct teaching. Document submitted to Hōjō Tokiyori	Kamakura period, 1260	One scroll, ink on paper, 29.3 cm × 1,598.2 cm (11.5 in × 629.2 in)	Hokekyō-ji, Ichikawa, Chiba	
Notes on Guidance Toward Birth in the West (西方指南抄, saihō shinanshō) or "A Teaching to the Western Land" or "Collections Showing the Way to the West"	Shinran	Compilation of Hōnen's (teacher of Shinran) words in the form of writings, letters and records of words or events	Kamakura period, 1256	Six books bound by fukuro-toji, 28.2 cm × 18.2 cm (11.1 in × 7.2 in)	Senju-ji, Tsu, Mie	
Contemplation Sutra commentary (観無量寿経註, Kanmuryōju-kyō chū)	Shinran	With annotations between lines and on the margin	Kamakura period, 13th century	One scroll, ink on paper	Nishi Hongan-ji, Kyoto	
Amitabha Sutra commentary (阿弥陀経註, Amida-kyō chū)	Shinran	With annotations between lines and on the margin	Kamakura period, 13th century	One scroll, ink on paper	Nishi Hongan-ji, Kyoto	
A Collection of Passages Revealing the True Teaching, Practice and realization of the Pure Land Way (教行信証, Kyōgyōshinshō), Bandō manuscript (坂東本)	Shinran	Series of selections and commentaries on Buddhist sutras; intermediate draft and only extant manuscript of the Kyōgyōshinshō with earlier versions going back to 1224	Kamakura period, 1235	Six books bound by fukuro-toji	Ōtani sect of Jodo Shinshu, Kyoto	
Sanjō Wasan (三帖和讃)	Shinran	Three collections of hymns praising the virtue of the bodhisattva and high priest: Jōdo Wasan (Hymns of the Pure Land), Kōso Wasan (Hymns of the Pure Land Masters) and the Shōzōmatsu Wasan (Hymns of the Dharma‐Ages)	Kamakura period, 13th century	Three books bound by fukuro-toji	Senju-ji, Tsu, Mie	
Universally Recommended Instructions for Zazen (普勧坐禅儀, fukan zazengi)	Dōgen	Written six years after Dōgen's return from China	Kamakura period, 1233	One scroll, ink on paper, 28.8 cm × 319.2 cm (11.3 in × 125.7 in)	Eihei-ji, Eiheiji, Fukui	

=== Zen monk writings, bokuseki ===
Bokuseki is a type of Japanese calligraphy practiced by Zen monks or lay practitioners of Zen meditation. Characterised by freely written bold characters, the style often ignores criteria and classical standards for calligraphy. The brush is moved continuously across the paper creating richly variated lines. Unlike other calligraphy, bokuseki is considered "religious art"—a manifestation of the artist's understanding of the Dharma. In this sense, the literal meaning of the word "bokuseki", translated as "ink trace", indicates the piece is considered to be a trace of the enlightened mind.

The bokuseki style developed from Song dynasty calligraphy. It was brought from China to Japan, together with Zen Buddhism, starting with Eisai in 1191. Late-12th century works imported from China were highly regarded in Japan; subsequently Japanese priests began producing their own bokuseki in the 13th and 14th centuries. Later bokuseki became part of the zen practice and served as meditation help. They were often mounted on hanging scrolls, and displayed in temples and tea rooms. The master of the Japanese tea ceremony Sen no Rikyū considered them crucial to the tea ceremony in the sense that they put the participants in the right frame-of-mind. Bokuseki gained in importance through the chanoyu in the Muromachi and Momoyama periods. Daitō Kokushi and Musō Soseki, both from the Rinzai school of Zen Buddhism, were the most famous bokuseki masters of the time.

The bokuseki style is present in a variety of Zen genres such as Buddhist sermons or Dharma talks (hōgo), certificates of enlightenment (inkajō), death verses (yuige), gatha verses (geju), poetry (Note: One's own poetry or that of a poet or master.) (shi), letters, names and titles given to a monk by his master (jigo), exhortory sermons (shidōgo), gakuji, (Note: Two or three large characters written horizontally for display over a doorway or on a wall.) inscriptions on Zen paintings (san) and Zen circles. There are 23 bokuseki national treasures of various types including inkajō, hōgo, letters and yuige. They date from the 12th to 14th centuries and have been mounted on hanging scrolls.

Name	Authors	Remarks	Date	Format	Present location	Image
Certificate of Buddhist Spiritual Achievement (印可状, inkajō)	Yuanwu Keqin	First half of an enlightenment certificate given to Yuanwu's disciple Huqiu Shaolong in recognition of his spiritual achievement. Oldest extant document written by a Chan master. Also known as Floating Yuanwu (流れ圜悟, Nagare Engo)	Northern Song, 1124	One hanging scroll, ink on paper, 43.9 cm × 52.4 cm (17.3 in × 20.6 in)	Tokyo National Museum, Tokyo	
Teaching on Enlightenment (法語, hōgo)	Xutang Zhiyu (虚堂智愚, Kidō Chigu)	Dedicated to a brilliant Zen practitioner, possibly Mushō Jōshō (無象静照) (1234–1306)	Southern Song, 13th century	One hanging scroll, ink on paper, 28.5 cm × 70.0 cm (11.2 in × 27.6 in)	Tokyo National Museum, Tokyo	
Poems dedicated to Muin Genkai (与無隠元晦詩, Muin Genkai ni ataerushi)	Feng Zizhen (馮子振, Fū Shishin)	Three poems with seven characters per line dedicated to the Japanese monk Muin Genkai	Yuan dynasty, 14th century	One hanging scroll, ink on paper, 32.7 cm × 102.4 cm (12.9 in × 40.3 in)	Tokyo National Museum, Tokyo	
Teaching on Enlightenment (法語, hōgo)	Liaoan Qingyu (了菴清欲, Ryōan Seiyoku)	Note about the attainment of enlightenment. Written for a Japanese monk, Teki Zōsu (的蔵主), who had travelled to Liaoan Qingyu in China	Yuan dynasty, 1341	One hanging scroll, ink on paper, 27.9 cm × 73.9 cm (11.0 in × 29.1 in)	Tokyo National Museum, Tokyo	
Letter of Dahui Zonggao (尺牘, sekitoku)	Dahui Zonggao	Letter from Dahui's exile in Meizhou to his friend, the lay practitioner Wuxiang	Southern Song, 12th century	One hanging scroll, ink on paper, 37.9 cm × 65.5 cm (14.9 in × 25.8 in)	Tokyo National Museum, Tokyo	
Letter of Wuzhun Shifan (尺牘, sekitoku)	Wuzhun Shifan	Letter of thanks for Enni Ben'en's donation after the destruction of Wanshou Temple by fire. Also known as the "Calligraphy of the Board Gift"	Southern Song, 1243	One hanging scroll, ink on paper, 32.1 cm × 100.6 cm (12.6 in × 39.6 in)	Tokyo National Museum, Tokyo	
Text read aloud at a Buddhist mass on the anniversary of the death of Bodhidharma (Note: On October 5) (達磨忌拈香語, darumaki renkōgo)	Xutang Zhiyu (虚堂智愚, Kidō Chigu)	—	Southern Song, around 1265	One hanging scroll, ink on paper	Daitoku-ji, Kyoto	—
Farewell verse to Betsugen Enshi (別源円旨送別偈, Betsugen Enshi sōbetsu-ge)	Gulin Qingmou (古林清茂, Kurin Seimo)	Verification that Betsugen Enshi had been initiated into the ascetic practice	Yuan dynasty, 1325	One hanging scroll, ink on paper, 37.7 cm × 99.2 cm (14.8 in × 39.1 in)	Gotoh Museum, Tokyo	
Letter on the opening ceremony of the lecture hall by the newly appointed chief priest Myōsō Saitetsu (明叟斉哲開堂諸山疏, Myōsō Saitetsu kaidō shozan)	Jikusen Bansen (竺仙梵僊)	—	Song dynasty, Yuan dynasty	Two hanging scrolls, silk	Ryōkō-in (龍光院), Kita-ku, Kyoto	—
Getsurin Dōgō (月林道号)	Gulin Qingmou (古林清茂, Kurin Seimo)	Document on the monk Getsurin Dōgō (1293–1351), student of Kurin Seimo and founder of Chōfuku-ji	Yuan dynasty, 1327	One hanging scroll	Chōfuku-ji (長福寺), Ukyō-ku, Kyoto	
gabatsu (画跋)	Feng Zizhen (馮子振, Fū Shishin)	Afterword composed on a painting "Flowers and Insects" by Yi Yuanji	Yuan dynasty, 14th century	One hanging scroll, ink on paper, 30.0 cm × 118.4 cm (11.8 in × 46.6 in)	Tokiwayama Bunko, Kamakura, Kanagawa	
Death verse (遺偈, yuige)	Qingzhuo Zhengcheng (清拙正澄, Seisetsu Shōchō)	Written by Qingzhuo Zhengcheng, a high-ranking priest of Kennin-ji, on the day of his death which shows in the style of the writing	Nanboku-chō period, 1339	One hanging scroll, ink on paper, 36.6 cm × 92.4 cm (14.4 in × 36.4 in)	Tokiwayama Bunko, Kamakura, Kanagawa	
Buddhist sermon (法語, hōgo)	Mittan Kanketsu (密庵咸傑)	Highly praised by masters of the tea ceremony; a special place called Mittan toko had been designed for this scroll in the tea room inside the shoin at Ryōkō-in	Southern Song, 1179	One hanging scroll, ink on paper, 27.3 cm × 102.1 cm (10.7 in × 40.2 in)	Ryōkō-in (龍光院), Kita-ku, Kyoto	—
Verse of Praise (与長楽寺一翁偈語, ｃｈōrakuji ichiō niatauru no gego)	Mugaku Sogen (無学祖元)	Presented to his fellow student, Ichiō Ingō (一翁院豪), by Mugaku Sogen, praising his enlightenment; written in the same year in which Mugaku Sogen moved to Japan following the Mongol invasion of China	Southern Song, Kamakura period, December 11, 1279	Four hanging scrolls	Shōkoku-ji, Kyoto	
Certificate of Buddhist Spiritual Achievement for Enni (円爾印可状, Enni inkajō)	Wuzhun Shifan	Approbation certificate for the Japanese monk Enni Ben'en	Southern Song, 1237	One hanging scroll, ink on paper	Tōfuku-ji, Kyoto	
sanmonso (山門疏)	Wuzhun Shifan	Text to be read aloud at the dōjō (道場; meditation) ceremony	Southern Song, 13th century	One hanging scroll, ink on silk, 44.8 cm × 132.5 cm (17.6 in × 52.2 in)	Gotoh Museum, Tokyo	
Letter by Dahui Zonggao (尺牘, sekitoku)	Dahui Zonggao	—	Southern Song	One hanging scroll	Hatakeyama Memorial Museum of Fine Art, Tokyo	—
Buddhist sermon and regulations (法語規則, hōgo kisoku)	Daikaku Zenji (大覚禅師) (Rankei Dōryū/Lanxi Daolong)	The sermon, directed to the monks inside the temple, warns of procrastination and calls for devotion to studying. The regulations provide strict rules for the daily life of ascetic monks, from the time of washing to how to roll up a bamboo screen	Southern Song, Kamakura period	Two hanging scrolls, ink on paper, 85.2 cm × 41.4 cm (33.5 in × 16.3 in) (sermon) and 85.5 cm × 40.7 cm (33.7 in × 16.0 in) (regulations)	Kenchō-ji, Kamakura, Kanagawa, in custody at Kamakura Museum of National Treasures	
Certificate of Buddhist Spiritual Achievement (印可状, inkajō)	Daitō Kokushi (大燈国師)/Shūhō Myōchō (宗峰妙超)	Certificate for Kanzan Egen (関山慧玄), student of Shūhō Myōchō	Kamakura period, Nanboku-chō period, 1330	One hanging scroll	Myōshin-ji, Kyoto	
kantoku shinsenbō (看読真詮榜) or kankinbō (看経榜)	Daitō Kokushi (大燈国師)/Shūhō Myōchō (宗峰妙超)	Instruction to priests about the recital of sutras	Kamakura period, Nanboku-chō period	One hanging scroll, ink on paper	Shinjuan (真珠庵), Kyoto	—
"Kanzan" (関山) (nickname)	Daitō Kokushi (大燈国師)/Shūhō Myōchō (宗峰妙超)	—	Kamakura period, Nanboku-chō period, 1329	One hanging scroll, ink on paper	Myōshin-ji, Kyoto	
Keiringe, Nangakuge (渓林偈、南獄偈)	Daitō Kokushi (大燈国師)/Shūhō Myōchō (宗峰妙超)	Keiringe is a poem about nature's great harmony when Shūhō Myōchō looked at a copse in late fall; Nangakuge is a poem about the grandeur of Mount Heng and the admiration for the Chinese emperor	Kamakura period, 14th century	Two hanging scrolls	Masaki Art Museum, Tadaoka, Osaka	
Sermon for Sōgo Taishi (与宗悟大姉法語, Sōgo Taishi hōgo)	Daitō Kokushi (大燈国師)/Shūhō Myōchō (宗峰妙超)	—	Kamakura period, Nanboku-chō period, May 13, 1330	One hanging scroll	Daisen-in, Kyoto	—

=== Kaishi or futokorogami ===
Kaishi, or futokorogami, were sheets of paper carried by high-ranking people folded in their kimonos at the breast. They were used for writing letters, or waka; similar sheets were employed during the tea ceremony. Papers came in a variety of sizes and colours, depending on the rank and sex of those using them. At court men wrote on white paper, while women wrote only on red kaishi paper. Eventually the paper format was standardized with sizes ranging from about 28 cm × 36 cm (11 in × 14 in) to 36 cm × 56 cm (14 in × 22 in). The folding style, labelling, and other stylistic features, differed from school to school. Four items from the Heian and Kamakura periods have been designated as national treasures in the kaishi category. They are single sheets or sets of sheets mounted on hanging scrolls or bound in an album and contain poetry by Japanese rulers and famous poets.

Name	Authors	Remarks	Date	Format	Present location	Image
Kumano poems (熊野懐紙, Kumano kaishi)	Emperor Go-Toba	Written on a pilgrimage to Kumano	Kamakura period, 1200	One hanging scroll, 31.5 cm × 48.5 cm (12.4 in × 19.1 in)	Nishi Hongan-ji, Kyoto	—
Kumano poems (熊野懐紙, Kumano kaishi)	Emperor Go-Toba, Fujiwara no Ietaka and Jakuren	Written on a pilgrimage to Kumano	Kamakura period, 1201	Three hanging scrolls: 30 cm × 43.5 cm (11.8 in × 17.1 in) (Jakuren)	Yōmei Bunko, Kyoto	
Poems on the Chapters of the Lotus Sutra (一品経懐紙, Ipponkyō kaishi)	various, among others Saigyō Hōshi and Jakuren	Collection of 28 poems on each chapter of the Lotus Sutra by as many famous poets and calligraphers of the late Heian period. Saigyō's poem was separated and mounted on a hanging scroll. A painting of a maple tree in autumn by Tosa Mitsuoki was added later and the poems were collected in an album around the same time	Kamakura period	One hanging scroll (27.4 cm × 47.6 cm (10.8 in × 18.7 in)) and one album (bound book) of 14 sheets, ink on paper	Kyoto National Museum, Kyoto	
Poem on kaishi paper by Fujiwara no Sukemasa (藤原佐理筆詩懐紙, Fujiwara no Sukemasa hitsu shikaishi)	Fujiwara no Sukemasa	Oldest extant shikaishi, a poem written on kaishi paper (a paper folded and tucked inside the front of the kimono)	Heian period, 969	One hanging scroll, ink on paper, 32.0 cm × 45.0 cm (12.6 in × 17.7 in)	The Kagawa Museum, Takamatsu, Kagawa	

=== Albums of exemplary calligraphy, tekagami ===
Collections of exemplary calligraphy, or tekagami (lit. "mirror of the hands"), were created by cutting pages and sections of old books and scrolls of sutras, poems and letters, which were arranged in albums in a chronological order or according to social status. By the early-16th century, calligraphic connoisseurs of the Kohitsu house had practiced activities aimed at preserving ancient calligraphic works. Tekagami production appears to have started in the Momoyama period. These albums served as model books for calligraphy practice, the emulation of old styles, and as reference works for authentication in the growing antique market. Today, the selection of calligraphers, and the type of calligraphies in a tekagami, show the changing tastes in classical Japanese-style calligraphy over the years. Four tekagami containing works from the 8th century Nara to the 15th century Muromachi period have been designated as national treasures.

Name	Authors	Remarks	Date	Format	Present location	Image
Castle of Brush and Ink Album (手鑑 翰墨城, tekagami kanbokujō)	various	Together with the "Companions of Past Ages" and the "Moshiogusa Album of Exemplary Calligraphy" considered to be one of the three great albums of exemplary calligraphy	Nara period to Muromachi period, 8th – 15th century	One album (bound book) with 311 segments (154 on obverse side, 157 on reverse side)	MOA Museum of Art, Atami, Shizuoka	
Companions of Past Ages (手鑑 見ぬ世の友, tekagami minu yo no tomo)	various	Together with the "Kanbokujō" and the "Moshiogusa Album of Exemplary Calligraphy" considered to be one of the three great albums of exemplary calligraphy	Nara period to Muromachi period, 8th – 15th century	One album with 229 segments; 36.0 cm × 47.5 cm (14.2 in × 18.7 in)	Idemitsu Museum of Arts, Tokyo	—
Moshiogusa Album of Exemplary Calligraphy (手鑑 藻塩草, tekagami Moshiogusa)	various	Samples on the obverse side are arranged by status of the author (from emperors and crown princes down to poets). Handed down in the Kohitsu family in the Edo period. Together with the "Kanbokujō" and the "Companions of Past Ages" considered to be one of the three great albums of exemplary calligraphy	Nara period to Muromachi period, 8th – 15th century	One album (bound book) with 242 segments (117 on obverse side, 125 on reverse side), 39.7 cm × 34.8 cm (15.6 in × 13.7 in)	Kyoto National Museum, Kyoto	
Large Collection of handwritings (大手鑑, Ōtekagami)	various	Collection of calligraphy, imperial correspondence, and other works	Nara period to Muromachi period, 8th – 15th century	Two albums (bound books), album one with 139 segments, album two with 168 segments	Yōmei Bunko, Kyoto	

=== Ancient calligraphy, kohitsu ===
In Japanese calligraphy the term Kohitsu (古筆) originally referred to works by ancient calligraphers, or poets, on scrolls or bound books, created from between the 8th to 15th centuries. In today's use, the term mainly describes copies of poetry anthologies from the Heian to mid-Kamakura period. Since they were made as artful daily items for the nobility, in addition to having a beautiful script, attention was given to the choice of paper (which was often decorated), the binding, mountings and even accompanying boxes. Stylistically, kohitsu were written in Japanese kana in cursive script (sōgana). In the Momoyama and early Edo period, surviving kohitsu were often cut (kohitsu-gire), mounted on hanging scrolls and displayed in a tea room. Six scrolls of kohitsu poetry collections from the mid-Heian period have been designated as national treasures. They were made by two calligraphers: Fujiwara no Yukinari and Ono no Michikaze.

Name	Authors	Remarks	Date	Format	Present location	Image
Poetic Anthology of Bo Juyi (白氏詩巻, Hakushi shikan)	Fujiwara no Yukinari	Collection of poems by the Chinese poet Bo Juyi	Heian period	One scroll	Masaki Art Museum, Tadaoka, Osaka	
Poetic Anthology of Bo Juyi (三体白氏詩巻, Santai Hakushi shikan)	Ono no Michikaze	Collection of poems by the Chinese poet Bo Juyi written in cursive, semi-cursive and regular script and representing the Japanese style halfway in its development	Heian period, 10th century	One scroll made by 8 joined sheets, ink on paper, 30.6 cm × 239.6 cm (12.0 in × 94.3 in)	Masaki Art Museum, Tadaoka, Osaka	
Drafts for inscriptions on screens (屛風土代, byōbu dodai)	Ono no Michikaze	With a postscript by Fujiwara no Sadanobu from 1140.	Heian period, 10th century	One handscroll with 18 drafts and one postscript, 24.4 cm × 434.9 cm (9.6 in × 171.2 in)	Museum of the Imperial Collections, Tokyo	
Poetic Anthology of Bo Juyi (白氏詩巻, Hakushi shikan)	Fujiwara no Yukinari	Collection of eight poems from volume 65 of the Poetic Anthology of Bo Juyi. With a postscript by Yukinari and a colophon by Emperor Fushimi	Heian period, 1018	One handscroll made of nine joined sheets, ink on paper, 25.4 cm × 265.2 cm (10.0 in × 104.4 in)	Tokyo National Museum, Tokyo	
Autumn Bushｰclover Scroll (秋萩帖, Akihagi-jō) and Commentary on the Military Strategy Chapter of the Huainanzi (淮南鴻烈兵略間詁, wainan kōretsu heiryaku kanko) on the reverse side	purportedly by Ono no Michikaze	Front: 48 Japanese poems on 1st–15th sheet and 12 (copies of) letters by Wang Xizhi on 16th–20th sheet all in simple cursive style. Poems on 1st sheet in hand of Ono no Michikaze, those on other sheets said to be by Fujiwara no Yukinari or possibly Emperor Fushimi Reverse: philosophical treaties in regular script covering 2nd–20th sheet	Heian period, 10th century	One handscroll made of twenty sheets, ink on decorative (colored) paper, 24.0 cm × 842.4 cm (9.4 in × 331.7 in)	Tokyo National Museum, Tokyo	
Document attributed to Fujiwara no Yukinari (伝藤原行成筆書巻, den Fujiwara no Yukinari hitsu shokan)	attributed to Fujiwara no Yukinari	The scroll, also known as Honnōji-gire, is written in Japanese style and contains compositions by Ono no Takamura, Sugawara no Michizane and Ki no Haseo (紀長谷雄)	Heian period	One scroll made of four sheets of paper, ink on paper, 29.4 cm × 188.2 cm (11.6 in × 74.1 in)	Honnō-ji, Kyoto	

=== Others ===
There are three national treasures writings that do not fit in any of the above categories, all originating in China. Two are 7th century works: a copy of the Thousand Character Classic by Zhi Yong both in formal and cursive scripts, and a tracing copy of a letter by the famous Chinese calligrapher Wang Xizhi. The former work (Note: But not this particular manuscript) is said to have been imported to Japan by the legendary scholar Wani in ancient times. One is a 13th-century set of large-scale letters (2 or 3 each) to be displayed on walls or above doorways.

Name	Authors	Remarks	Date	Format	Present location	Image
Thousand Character Classic in formal and cursive script (真草千字文, Shinsō senjimon)	Zhi Yong	—	Tang dynasty, 7th century	One bound book, 24.5 cm × 11 cm (9.6 in × 4.3 in)	private, Kyoto	Four lines of Chinese text.
Letter to Kong (孔侍中帖, kōjichūjō) (Chin.: Kong Shizhong Tie)	unknown	Tracing copy of a letter by Wang Xizhi. In the letter Wang inquires after the well-being of a friend	Tang dynasty, during reign of Emperor Taizong of Tang (626–649)	One hanging scroll, 24.8 cm × 41.8 cm (9.8 in × 16.5 in)	Maeda Ikutokukai, Tokyo	
zenin gakuji narabi ni haiji (禅院額字并牌字)	Wuzhun Shifan (two gakuji (Note: The scrolls read: 勅賜承天禅寺、大円覚) and five haiji (Note: The scrolls read: 上堂、小参、秉払、普説、説戒) scrolls) and Chiyō Sokushi, Zhang Jizhi (張即之) (12 gakuji (Note: The scrolls read: 普門院、方丈、旃檀林、解空室／東西蔵、首座、書記、維那、前後知客、浴司、三応) scrolls)	Wuzhun Shifan sent these items from China to his student Enni when the latter was at Jōten-ji, Hakata	Southern Song dynasty, 13th century	14 zenin gakuji (禅院額字) (Note: Two or three large characters written horizontally for display on a wall or over a doorway) and 5 禅院牌字, ink on paper, 44.8 cm × 92.3 cm (17.6 in × 36.3 in)	Tōfuku-ji, Kyoto (partially entrusted to the Kyoto National Museum)	

== See also ==
- List of Japanese poetry anthologies
- List of Japanese classic texts
- Nara Research Institute for Cultural Properties
- Tokyo Research Institute for Cultural Properties
- Independent Administrative Institution National Museum
