= List of cultural properties of Japan – paintings (Osaka) =

This list is of the cultural properties of Japan designated in the category of paintings (絵画, kaiga) for the Urban Prefecture of Ōsaka.

== National Cultural Properties ==
As of 1 February 2016, one hundred and twenty-two Important Cultural Properties have been designated (including nine *National Treasures), being of national significance.

Property	Date	Municipality	Ownership	Comments	Image	Dimensions	Coordinates	Ref.
*Divinely inspired Reception of the Two Great Sutras, colour on silk 絹本著色両部大経感得図 kenpon chakushoku ryōbudai kyōkan toku zu	Heian period	Ōsaka	Fujita Museum	pair of scrolls		177.8 centimetres (70.0 in) by 141.8 centimetres (55.8 in)	34°41′42″N 135°31′30″E	
*Landscape of the Four Seasons with the Sun and the Moon, colour on paper 紙本著色日月四季山水図 shihon chakushoku jitsugetsu shiki sansui zu	Muromachi period	Kawachinagano	Kongō-ji	pair of screens		147.0 centimetres (57.9 in) by 313.5 centimetres (123.4 in)	34°25′43″N 135°31′47″E	
*New Moon Over the Brushwood Gate, ink on paper 紙本墨画柴門新月図 shihon bokuga saimon shingetsu zu	1405	Ōsaka	Fujita Museum			129.2 centimetres (50.9 in) by 31 centimetres (12 in)	34°41′42″N 135°31′30″E	
Kishi Monju, light colour on silk 絹本淡彩騎獅文殊像 kenpon tansai kishi Monju zō	early Nanboku-chō period	Tadaoka	Masaki Art Museum	with gasan by Kokan Shiren			34°29′41″N 135°23′32″E	
Pangu, light colour on silk, by Dong Qichang 絹本淡彩盤谷図〈董其昌筆／〉 kenpon tansai Bankoku zu	late Ming	Ōsaka	Osaka City Museum of Fine Arts				34°39′00″N 135°30′38″E	
Andō Renshō, colour on silk 絹本著色安東蓮聖像 kenpon chakushoku Andō Renshō zō	1330	Kishiwada	Kumeda-dera (久米田寺)				34°27′34″N 135°24′42″E	
Ishida Masatsugu, colour on silk 絹本著色石田正継像 kenpon chakushoku Ishida Masatsugu zō	Momoyama period		Jushō-in (壽聖院)			99.0 centimetres (39.0 in) by 53.3 centimetres (21.0 in)		
High Gate of Lord Yu, colour on silk, by Watanabe Kazan 絹本著色于公高門図〈渡辺華山筆／〉 kenpon chakushoku Ukō kōmon zu (Watanabe Kazan hitsu)	C19		AMG					
Enma-ō, colour on silk 絹本著色閻魔王図 kenpon chakushoku Enma-ō zu	Kamakura period	Sakai	Chōsen-ji (長泉寺)				34°34′12″N 135°28′14″E	
Enma-ten Mandala, colour on silk 絹本著色閻魔天曼荼羅図 kenpon chakushoku Enma-ten mandara zu	Kamakura period		private					
Kasuga Shrine Mandala, colour on silk 絹本著色春日宮曼荼羅図 kenpon chakushoku Kasuga-miya mandara zu	1300	Chūō-ku, Ōsaka	Yuki Museum of Art				34°41′15″N 135°30′08″E	
Manifestation of Kasuga Myōjin, colour on silk, by Takashina Takakane 絹本著色春日明神影向図〈高階隆兼筆／〉 kenpon chakushoku Kasuga Myōjin yōgō zu (Takashina Takakane hitsu)	1312	Ōsaka	Fujita Museum				34°41′42″N 135°31′30″E	
Kishi Monju, colour on silk, by Ryōzen 絹本著色騎獅文殊像〈良全筆／〉 kenpon chakushoku kishi Monju zō (Ryōzen hitsu)	Nanboku-chō period	Tadaoka	Masaki Art Museum				34°29′41″N 135°23′32″E	
Sen no Rikyū, colour on silk 絹本著色千利休像 kenpon chakushoku Sen no Rikyū zō	1561	Tadaoka	Masaki Art Museum	with gasan dating to 1583			34°29′41″N 135°23′32″E	

== Prefectural Cultural Properties ==
As of 12 March 2020, eighteen properties have been designated at a prefectural level.

Property	Date	Municipality	Ownership	Comments	Image	Dimensions	Coordinates	Ref.
Thirty-Six Immortals of Poetry, plaques at Hata Jinja 波太神社 三十六歌仙扁額; Hata Jinja sanjūrokkasen hengaku	c. 1700	Hannan	Hata Jinja (波太神社)	thirty-six panels; by Tosa Mitsunari (土佐光成)		51.6 centimetres (20.3 in) by 40.0 centimetres (15.7 in)	34°20′38″N 135°14′41″E	
Legends of Izumi Hasedera, colour on paper, from Hase-dera 長谷寺 紙本著色 和泉長谷寺縁起; Hase-dera shihon chakushoku Izumi Hasedera engi	Muromachi period	Sakai	Hase-dera (長谷寺) (kept at the Osaka City Museum of Fine Arts)	three scrolls		33.0 centimetres (13.0 in) by 1,621.0 centimetres (53 ft 2.2 in), 1,848.3 centimetres (60 ft 7.7 in), and 1,586.0 centimetres (52 ft 0.4 in)	34°39′00″N 135°30′38″E	
Seated Fudō Myōō, colour on silk 絹本著色 不動明王坐像 kenpon chakushoku Fudō Myōō zazō	Heian period	Yao	Jingū-ji (神宮寺)				34°36′23″N 135°38′17″E	
Star Mandala, colour on silk 絹本著色星曼荼羅図 kenpon chakushoku hoshi mandara zu	Nanboku-chō period	Ōsaka	Osaka City (kept at the Osaka Museum of History			131.1 centimetres (51.6 in) by 86.5 centimetres (34.1 in)	34°40′57″N 135°31′15″E	
Fifteen Scenes from the Life of Mary, colour on silk 紙本著色マリア十五玄義図 kenpon chakushoku Maria jūgo gengizu	Edo period	Ibaraki	private (kept at the Ibaraki City Museum of Cultural Properties (茨木市立文化財資料館)	discovered in 1920 in a bamboo cylinder roped to roofing material in a village outside Osaka once ruled by the kirishitan daimyō Takayama Ukon; restored in 2006 to celebrate the 500th anniversary of the birth of Francis Xavier, who is depicted alongside Ignatius of Loyola		77 centimetres (30 in) by 64 centimetres (25 in)	34°48′09″N 135°34′06″E	
Spring and Autumn Oxen at Play, byōbu 春秋遊牛図屏風 shunjū yū ushi zu byōbu		Ōsaka	Ōsaka Tenman-gū (kept at the Osaka City Museum of Fine Arts)				34°39′00″N 135°30′38″E	

== Municipal Cultural Properties ==
Properties designated at a municipal level include:

Property	Date	Municipality	Ownership	Comments	Image	Dimensions	Coordinates	Ref.
Works by Saeki Yūzō from the Collection of Yamamoto Hatsujirō 山本發次郎蒐集による佐伯祐三作品; Yamamoto Hatsujirō shūshū ni yoru Saeki Yūzō sakuhin	Taishō and Shōwa periods	Osaka	Osaka City Museum of Fine Arts	forty-two paintings			34°39′00″N 135°30′38″E	

== See also ==
- Cultural Properties of Japan
- List of National Treasures of Japan (paintings)
- Japanese painting
- List of Historic Sites of Japan (Ōsaka)
