= Senboku District =

Senboku District may refer to:

- Semboku District, Akita (仙北郡)
- Senboku District, Osaka (泉北郡)
