= Koyasan Reihōkan =

Art museum in Wakayama Prefecture, Japan

- 高野山 霊宝館
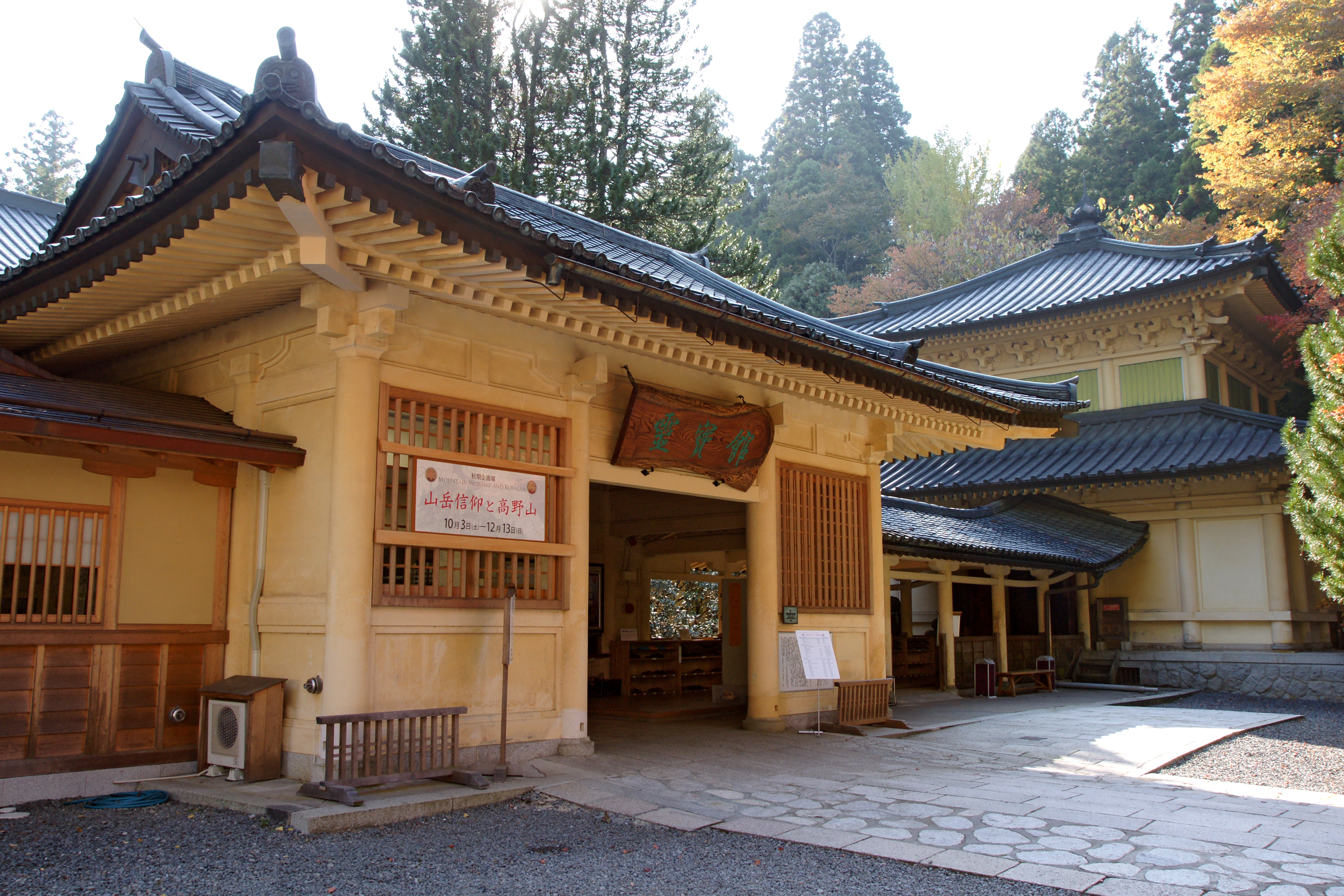
- Coordinates: 34.211278°N 135.581472°E
- Collections: Cultural properties of Koyasan
- Website: www.reihokan.or.jp

Kōyasan Reihōkan (高野山 霊宝館; lit. "Kōyasan Museum of Sacred Treasures") is an art museum on Kōya-san, Wakayama Prefecture, Japan, preserving and displaying Buddhist art owned by temples on Kōya-san. The collection is centered around articles from the Heian and Kamakura periods and includes paintings, calligraphy, sutras, sculpture and Buddhist ritual objects. Among these are a set of the complete Buddhist canon (issaikyō), writings of Kūkai and Minamoto no Yoritomo, founder of the Kamakura Shogunate, mandalas and portraits of priests. The most valuable objects have been designated as National Treasure or Important Cultural Property.

== History ==
Kōbō-Daishi, founder of Shingon Buddhism was a proponent of religious art as a way to enlightenment. Consequently, Shingon temples such as on Koyasan are among Japan's greatest repositories of Buddhist art. Initially, Koyasan's religious treasures were spread among the various subtemples with the highest concentration at Kongōbu-ji. Valuable objects were either locked away or — if used liturgically — placed at a distance from the viewer and often poorly lit. Repeatedly unrolling handscrolls or paintings on scrolls on request of visitors caused further damage. Following the Meiji Restoration, at the end of the 19th century, the government introduced a policy of separation of Shinto and Buddhism (Shinbutsu bunri) and many Buddhist temples became destitute. Some of Koyasan's artworks ended up in collections of museums in Tokyo, Kyoto or Nara or were sold to private persons, both domestically and to foreigners.

In order to stop the outflow of cultural properties the government passed a series of laws starting with the Ancient Temples and Shrines Preservation Law (古社寺保存法, koshaji hozonhō) in 1897 and continuing with the National Treasures Preservation Law (国宝保存法, kokuhō hozonhō) in 1929 and the Law for the Protection of Cultural Properties (文化財保護法, bunkazai hogohō) from 1950 which, after a number of revisions and extension, is still effective today.

The Koyasan Reihōkan was established with the help of volunteers by Kongōbu-ji, the head temple at Koyasan, with the aim to preserve and exhibit the precious religious and cultural heritage of Koyasan. Construction of the building in a wooded area southwest of Daishi Kyōkai, the administrative center of Shingon Buddhism, was completed on 30 September 1920. This first museum consisted of two connected halls and was designed to vaguely resemble the Phoenix Hall at Byōdō-in, Uji. The opening of the museum was celebrated on 15 May 1921 and the head priest of Kongōbu-ji, Hōryū Doki (土宜法龍) assumed the position of first director. Subsequently, the temple's head priests continued to work as museum director.

On 16 September 1957, the Koyasan Cultural Property Preservation Society (高野山文化財保存会) was established and the museum put under its control. On 1 May 1961, the museum was expanded with the construction of the Koyasan Great Treasury (高野山大宝蔵), at the time the biggest of its kind in Japan and used mainly for nationally designated tangible cultural properties of the fine arts and crafts type. In 1984, on the 1150th anniversary of Kōbō-Daishi entering the state of eternal meditation (nyūjō (入定)), a new large standalone and fireproof building was constructed to the east of the old structure, effectively doubling the display space. It also provided the museum with modern features such as proper lighting, full temperature and humidity control; things that are still lacking in the old structure today. On 5 May 1988 five buildings of the museum were designated as registered tangible cultural property. The storage space was further extended in 2003. The admission office and the three museum buildings are connected by sheltered walkways.

== Collection ==
The museum stores more than 50,000 artifacts of which more than 28,000 have been designated as valuable. This includes 186 objects or sets of objects designated as 21 National Treasures (about 4800 articles), 147 Important Cultural Properties (about 20,000 articles), 16 Important Cultural Properties of Wakayama Prefecture (about 2850 articles) and 2 Important Works of Art.

=== National Treasures ===
==== Paintings ====
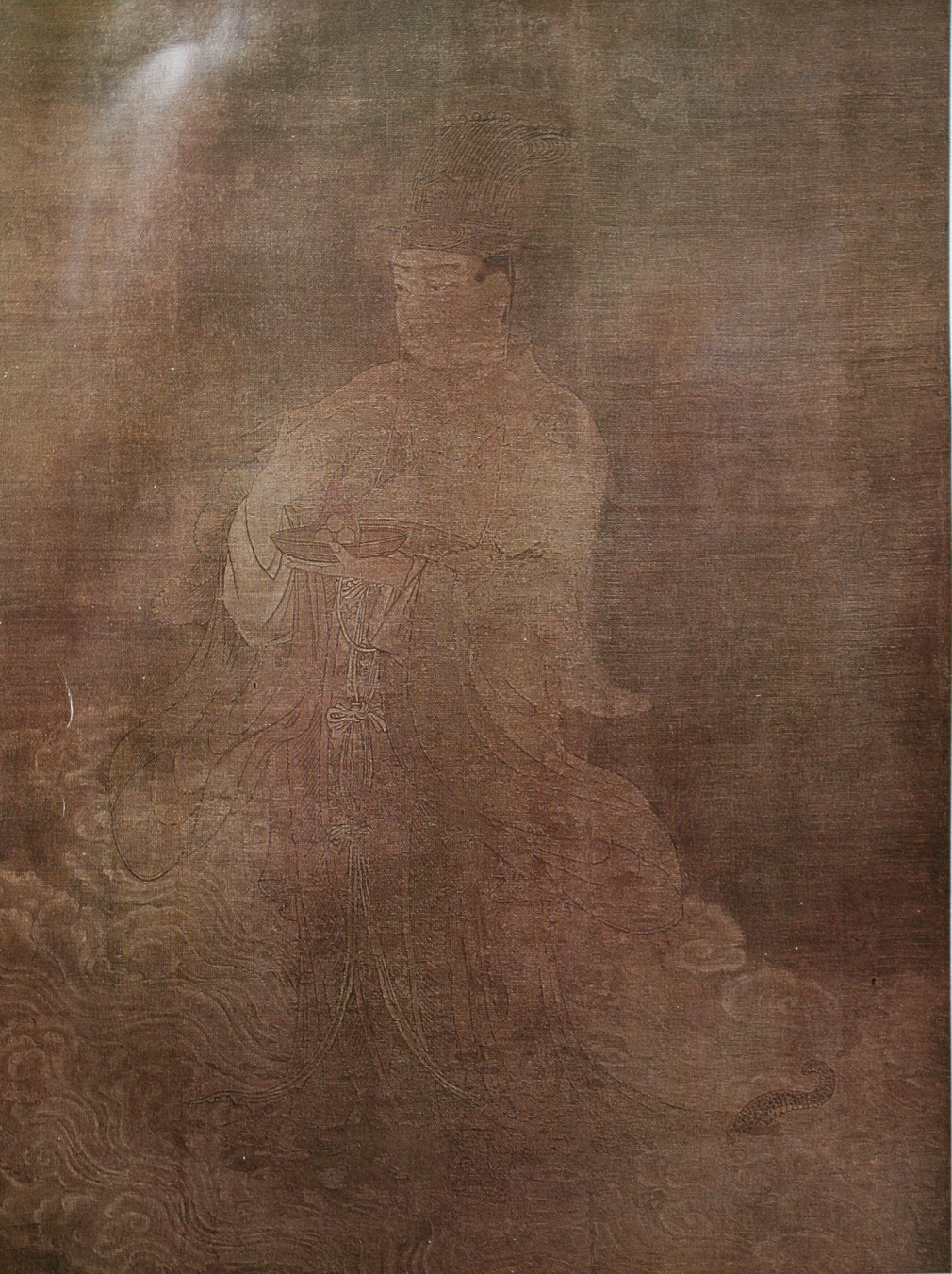
Dragon King Zennyo

Eight National Treasure paintings owned by six of Koyasan's temples are stored at the Reihōkan. A 163.6 cm × 111.2 cm (64.4 in × 43.8 in) hanging scroll showing the Dragon King Zennyo (絹本著色善女竜王像, kenpon chakushoku zennyo ryūōzō) has been designated as National Treasure. Painted by Jōchi (定智) in 1145 Heian period with color on silk, the scroll is owned by Kongōbu-ji.

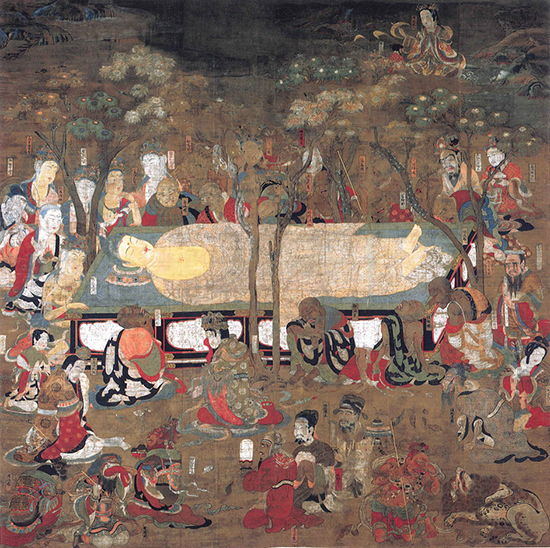
Buddha's Nirvana

Buddha's Nirvana (絹本著色仏涅槃図, kenpon chakushoku butsunehanzu), owned by Kongōbu-ji is a large scale, 267.6 cm × 271.2 cm (105.4 in × 106.8 in) hanging scroll painted with color on silk. Dated to 1086, Heian period, it is a type of Nirvana painting (nehan-zu) depicting the death and entrance to nirvana of the historical Buddha (Shaka). Typical for this kid of paintings, Shaka is shown lying on his deathbed surrounded by mourners. This painting is the oldest extant and finest of its type.

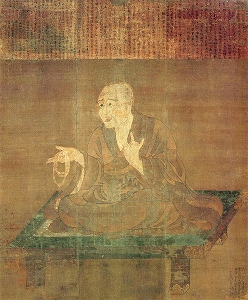
Monk Gonsō

The Portrait of Buddhist monk Gonsō (絹本著色勤操僧正像, kenpon chakushoku gonsō sōshō zō) is a 12th-century Heian period hanging scroll owned by Fūmon-in (普門院). The scroll painted in colors on silk measures 166.4 cm × 136.4 cm (65.5 in × 53.7 in). An inscription on the top tells of a wooden sculpture of Gonsō being created after his death by his pupils praying for happiness in the next world and praising Gonsō's learning and virtue.

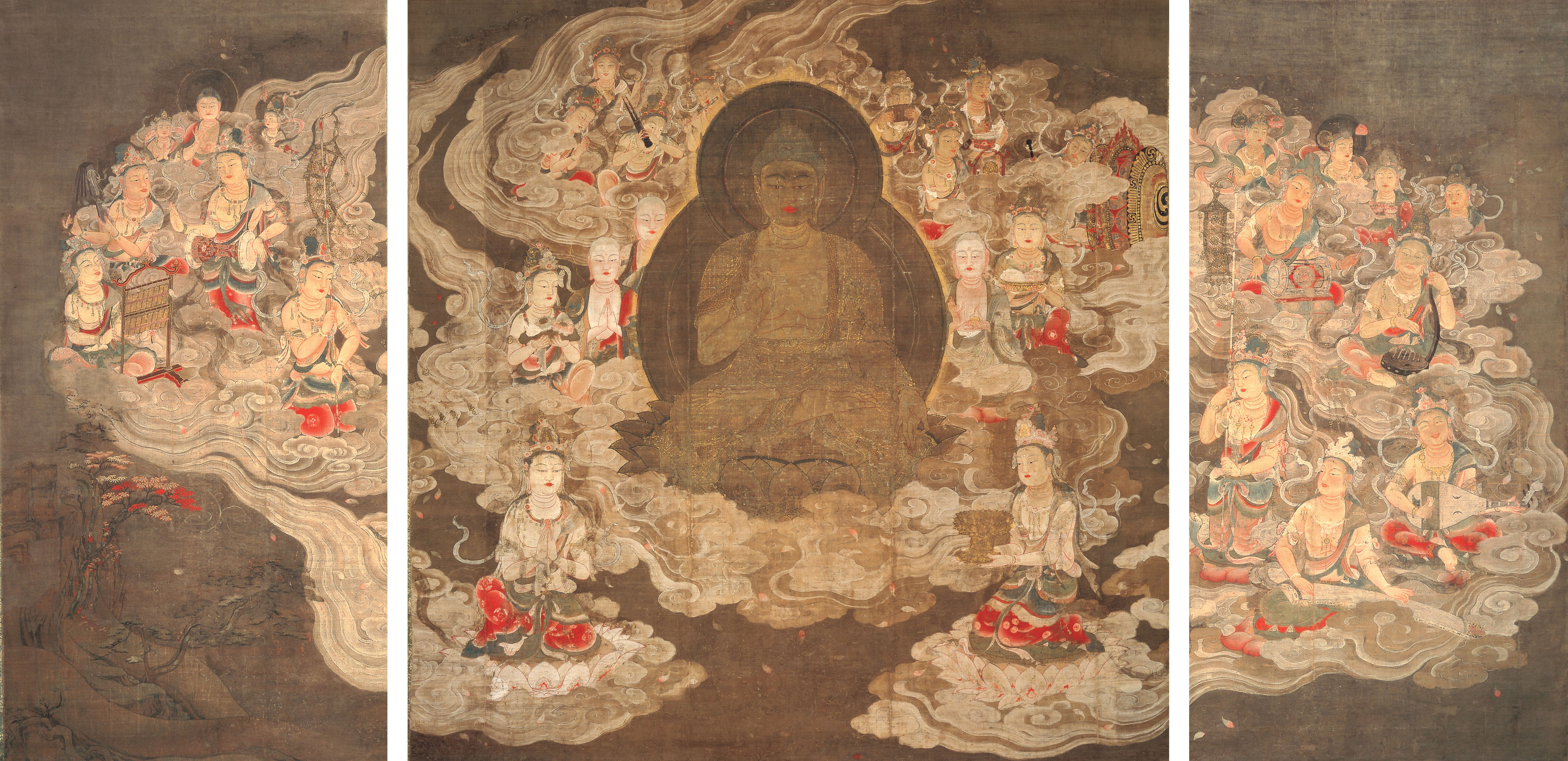
Central part of the Amida Raigō triptych

The triptych Coming of Amida Buddha and Saints of the Pure Land (絹本著色阿弥陀聖衆来迎図, kenpon chakushoku amida shōju raigō zu) depicts Amida Nyorai, surrounded by Buddhist saints playing musical instruments, come to greet the spirits of the deceased to escort them to the Pure Land, a topic known as raigō-zu (来迎図). Painted on three hanging scrolls with color on silk, this work dates to around 1200, the turn from the Heian to the Kamakura period and is owned by Yūshi Hachimankō Jūhakkain (有志八幡講十八箇院).

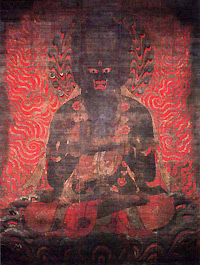
Kongōku

Originally consisting of five scrolls, the mid-Heian period treasure known as Five great Bodhisattvas of strength (絹本著色五大力菩薩像, kenpon chakushoku godairiki bosatsuzō) now consists of only three hanging scrolls after two were destroyed by fire in 1888. Painted with color on silk, the remaining scrolls show Kongōku (金剛吼) (322.8 cm × 179.5 cm (127.1 in × 70.7 in)), Ryūōku (龍王吼) (237.6 cm × 179.5 cm (93.5 in × 70.7 in)) and Muijūrikiku (無畏十力吼) (179.5 cm × 179.5 cm (70.7 in × 70.7 in)). Owned by Yūshi Hachimankō Jūhakkain (有志八幡講十八箇院), they are in custody at the Reihōkan.

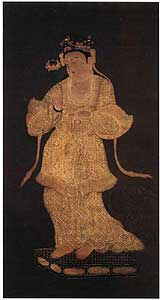
Senchū Yūgen Kannon

Ryūkōin (龍光院) owns a 12th-century, Heian period hanging scroll painted with color on silk showing the Senchū Yūgen Kannon (絹本著色伝船中湧現観音像, kenpon chakushoku den senchū yūgen kannonzō), a manifestation of Kannon who calms the raging waters. Literally the term Senchū Yūgen means inspired vision while on a boat. It is said that this Kannon appeared to the monk and founder of Shingon Buddhism, Kūkai in 806 while on a boat to China. Having the appearance of a deva and crowned with flowers, Senchū Yūgen Kannon is shown calming the waves with the hands.

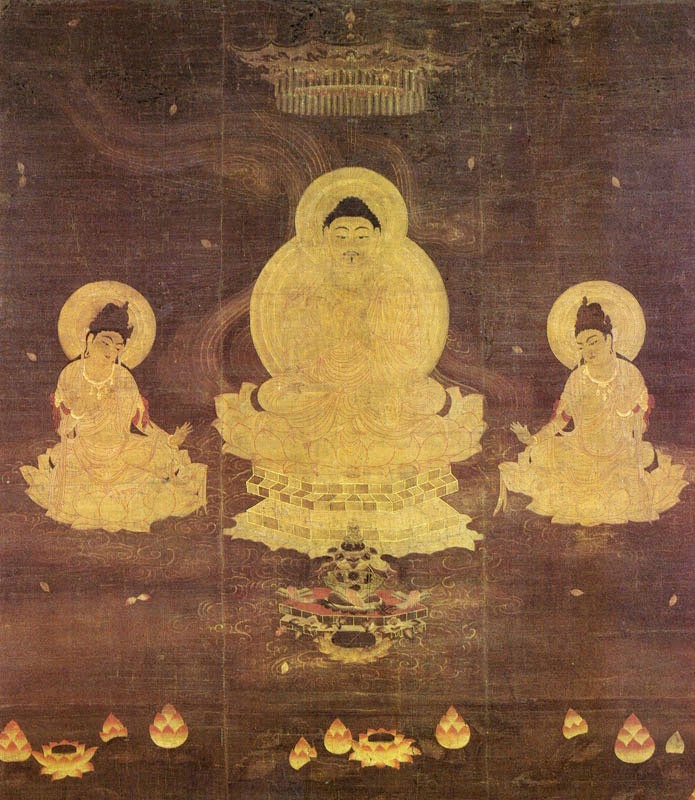
Amida Trinity

A Kamakura period hanging scroll of an Amida Trinity (絹本著色阿弥陀三尊像, kenpon chakushoku amida sansonzō) is held at the museum. Painted with color on silk, the scroll measures 154.0 cm × 135.0 cm (60.6 in × 53.1 in).

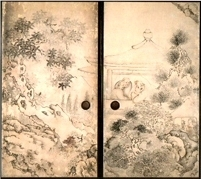
Paintings on fusuma

Ike no Taiga, among the most famous Edo period painters, decorated fusuma sliding partitions with landscape scenes in the nanga style. The designated National Treasure known as Landscape and figures on sliding partitions (紙本著色山水人物図, shihon chakushoku sansui jinbutsuzu) consists of ten paintings with color on paper.

==== Sculptures ====
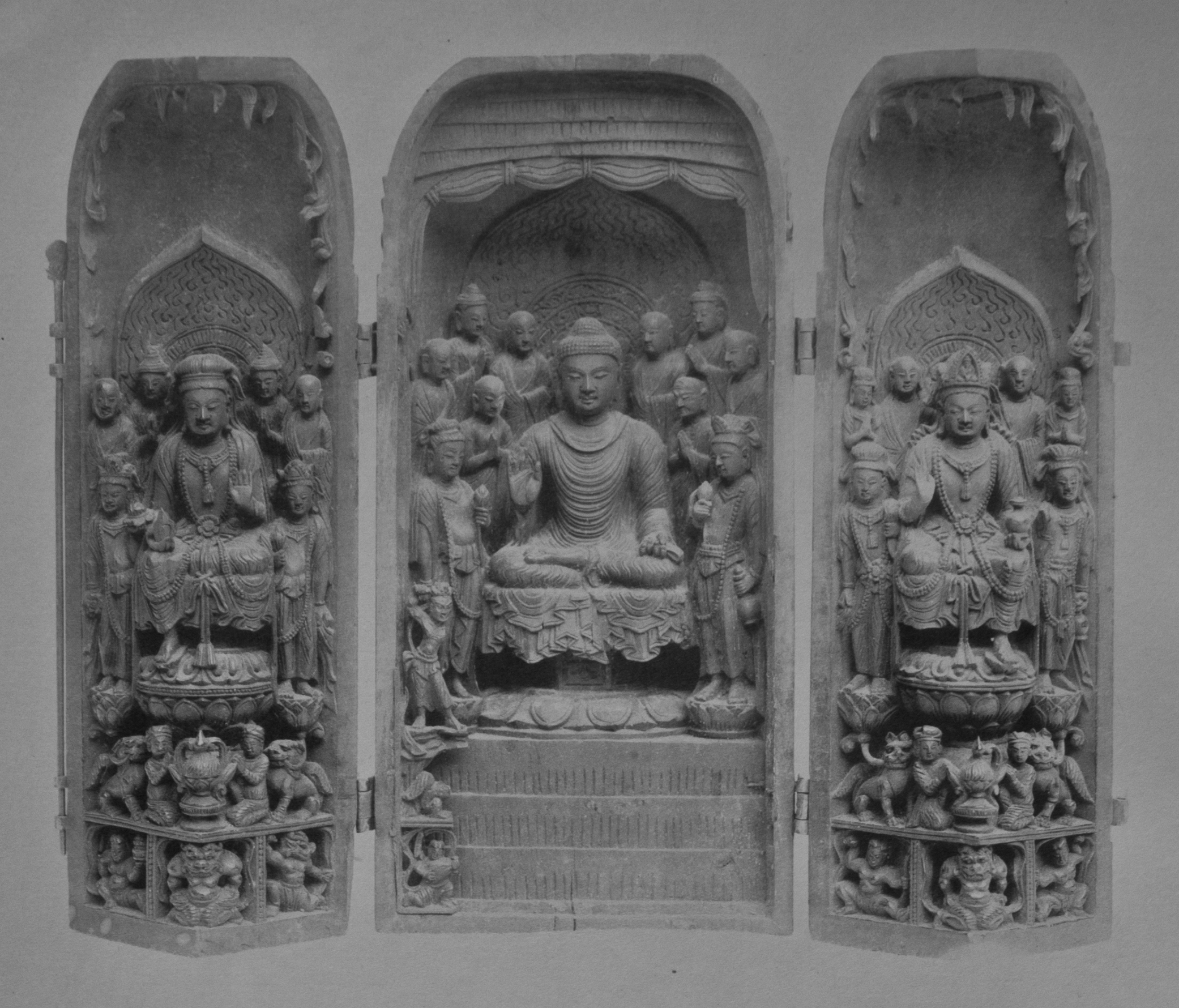
Miniature shrine

There are two National Treasures in the sculpture category, both owned by Kongōbu-ji. An 8th century Tang dynasty Miniature Buddhist shrine (木造諸尊仏龕, mokuzō shoson butsugan) brought back from China by Kūkai is stored at the museum. This 23.1 cm (9.1 in) sandalwood, natural wood surface (素地,, kiji) carving contains various Buddhist images.

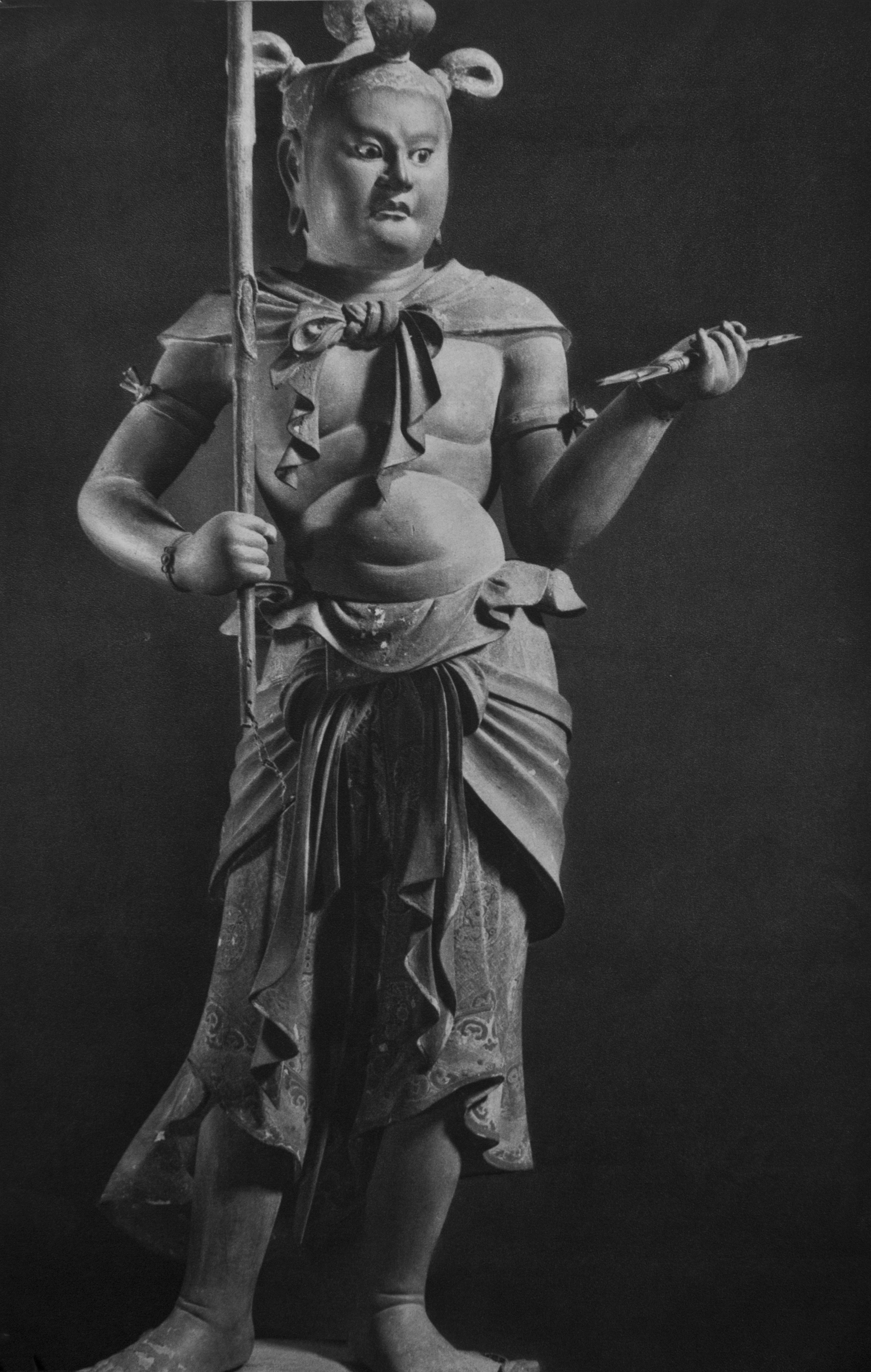
Seitaka

Six of the group of Eight Attendants of Fudō Myōō (木造八大童子立像, mokuzō hachidai dōji ryūzō), the oldest, dating to 1197 Kamakura period by Unkei are National Treasures: Ekō (慧光), Eki (慧喜), Ukubaga (烏倶婆誐), Shōjō Biku (清浄比丘), Kongara (矜羯羅), Seitaka (制多迦). The remaining two (Anokuda (阿耨達), Shitoku (指徳)) were produced in the 14th century and are not included in this nomination. The group, made of colored hinoki wood with crystal eyes, was formerly enshrined in the Fudō-dō (不動堂). All sculptures are around 1 m (3 ft 3 in) in size, specifically: 96.6 cm (38.0 in) (Ekō), 98.8 cm (38.9 in) (Eki), 95.1 cm (37.4 in) (Ukubaga), 97.1 cm (38.2 in) (Shōjō), 95.6 cm (37.6 in) (Kongara), 103.0 cm (40.6 in) (Seitaka).

==== Crafts ====
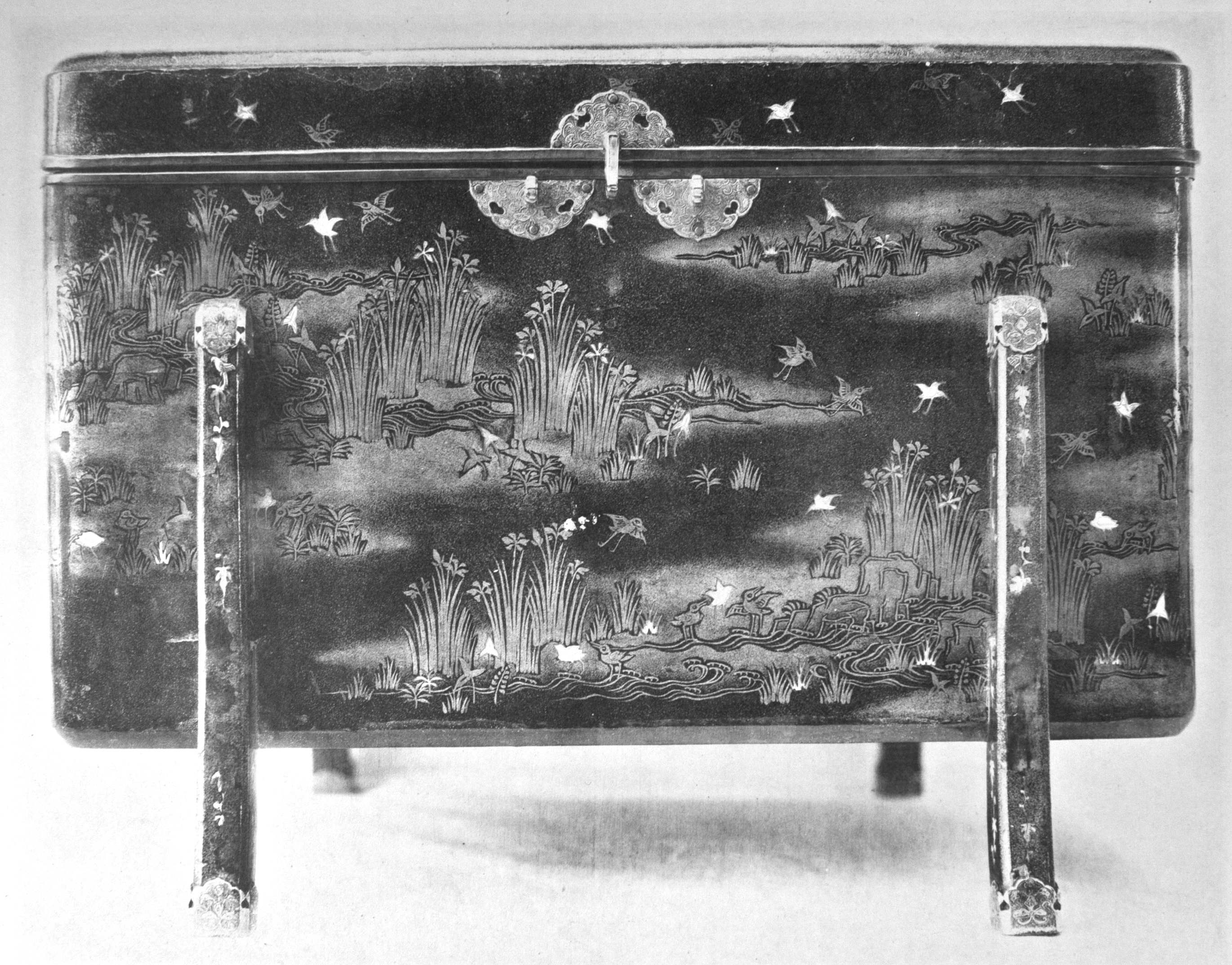
Chinese chest

A small Chinese style chest (karabitsu) with maki-e, mother of pearl inlay (澤千鳥螺鈿蒔絵小唐櫃, sawachidori raden makie kokarabitsu) and plover motifs from the 12th century Heian period is the only crafts National Treasure at the museum. The chest is covered with black lacquer and gold dust has been sprinkled to form the image of plovers playing in the marsh. It is thought that the chest was once used to store Buddhist scriptures.

==== Writings ====
Koyasan Reihōkan holds ten National Treasures related to writing, including six that are copies of sutras or sets of sutras, one religious study, two Japanese manuscripts of parts of the Wenguan cilin and one large set of ancient documents related to Mount Kōya.

Buddhist writings

Sutras

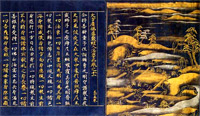
Chūson-ji Sutra

Known as Complete Buddhist scriptures in gold and silver letters (金銀字一切経, kinginji issaikyō) or Chūson-ji Sutras (中尊寺経, Chūson-ji kyō) is a large-scale collection of sutras, Buddhist regulations and sutra explanations initiated by Fujiwara no Kiyohira; dedicated to Chūson-ji and later presented to Kongōbu-ji by Toyotomi Hidetsugu. The articles are decorated with various pictures in gold and silver paint. A set of 15 similar scrolls that were part of the same collection remained at Chūson-ji and are part of another National Treasure. The items date to the Heian period from the second month 1117 to the third month 1126. In total there are 4,296 items: handscrolls with gold and silver letters on indigo blue paper.

There are several National Treasures related to copies of specific sutras, including 18 handscrolls of the Fukū Kenjaku Shinpen Shingon Sutra (不空羂索神変真言経, fukū kenjaku shinpen shingonkyō) from the 8th century Nara period held by Sanbō-in (三宝院); seven scrolls of the Lotus Sutra in large characters (大字法華経, daiji hokekyō) (vol. 3 missing) from Ryūkō-in (龍光院) also from the 8th century, and one scroll, vol. 6 of the Lotus Sutra (法華経, hokekyō) from the Heian period owned by Kongōbu-ji. The latter is notable for being written on colored paper.Ryūkō-in (龍光院) owns two treasures of the Konkōmyō Saishōō Sutra from the 8th century Nara period: one, consisting of ten scrolls and known as Konkōmyō Saishōō Sutra with gilt letters (紫紙金字金光明最勝王経, shishikinji konkōmyō saishōōkyō) was one of the sutras enshrined in the state-sponsored "Temples for the Protection of the State by the Golden Light (of the) Four Heavenly Kings" founded by Emperor Shōmu. The other, Konkōmyō Saishōō Sutra in minute characters (細字金光明最勝王経, saiji konkōmyō saishōōkyō), consisting of two scroll is unusual in having 34 characters per line instead of the usual 17.

Treatises, commentaries

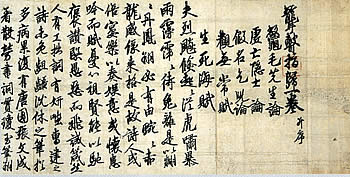
Rōkoshiiki

Written in 797 by the 24 year old monk and founder of Shingon Buddhism, Kūkai (Kōbō-Daishi), with the aim of affirming the superiority of Buddhism, the Rōkoshiiki (聾瞽指帰; Indications of the Teaching of the Three Religions) or Sangō Shiiki is a comparative study of Confucianism, Taoism and Buddhism. The two scrolls at the museum are written in Kūkai's own handwriting and measure 28.3 cm × 1,011 cm (11.1 in × 398.0 in) (18 pages) and 28.3 cm × 1,176 cm (11.1 in × 463.0 in) (21 pages).

Chinese books

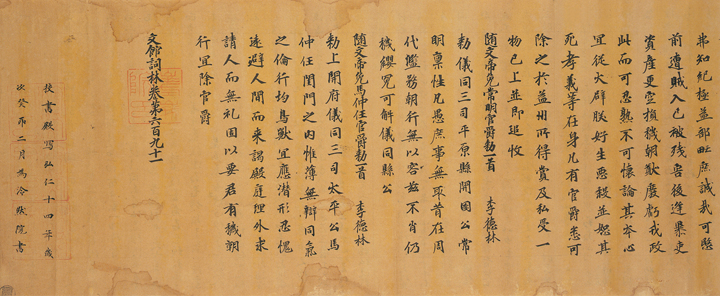
Wenguan Cilin, Shōchi-in

Shōchi-in (正智院) and Hōju-in (宝寿院) own Japanese manuscripts of parts of the Wenguan Cilin (文館詞林, Bunkan shirin; lit. "Forest of officials' poems and prose"), a Tang dynasty imperial poetry collection. Other manuscripts of this work had been lost in China as early as the 9th century. The treasure from Shōchi-in amounts to twelve scrolls from the Tang dynasty and Heian period, 677–823; the one from Hōju-in consists of a single scroll.

Ancient documents

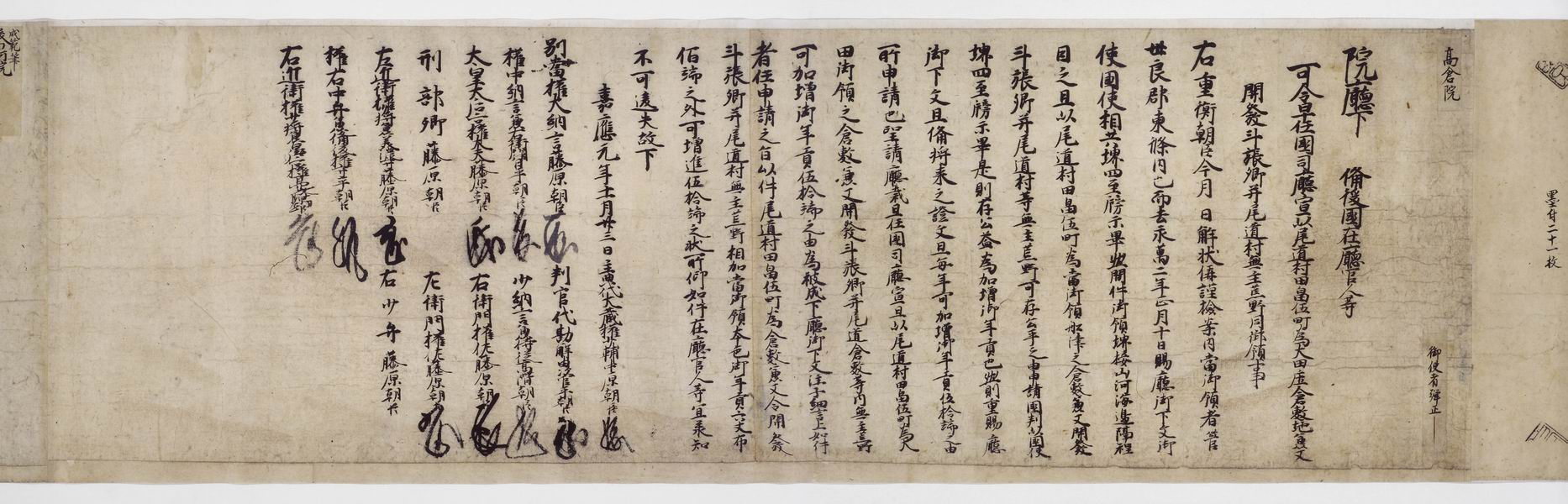
Hōkanshū

A large set of documents on the history, territory, function, and other aspects of life at Mount Kōya from the Heian period – Azuchi-Momoyama period has been designated as National Treasure in the category ancient documents. This treasure consists of three parts: Hōkanshū (宝簡集), Zoku Hōkanshū (続宝簡集), Yūzoku Hōkanshū (又続宝簡集), consisting of 54/77/167 rolled scrolls and 0/6/9 bound double-leaved (袋とじ, fukuro-toji) books respectively. Included in this collection are letters of notable historical figures such as Minamoto no Yoritomo, Minamoto no Yoshitsune and Saigyō Hōshi.

== See also ==
- List of National Treasures of Japan (sculptures)
- List of National Treasures of Japan (paintings)
- List of National Treasures of Japan (writings: others)
- List of National Treasures of Japan (writings: Chinese books)
- List of National Treasures of Japan (crafts: others)
- List of National Treasures of Japan (ancient documents)
