= Shinshōgokuraku-ji =

Buddhist temple in Kyoto, Japan

- 真正極楽寺
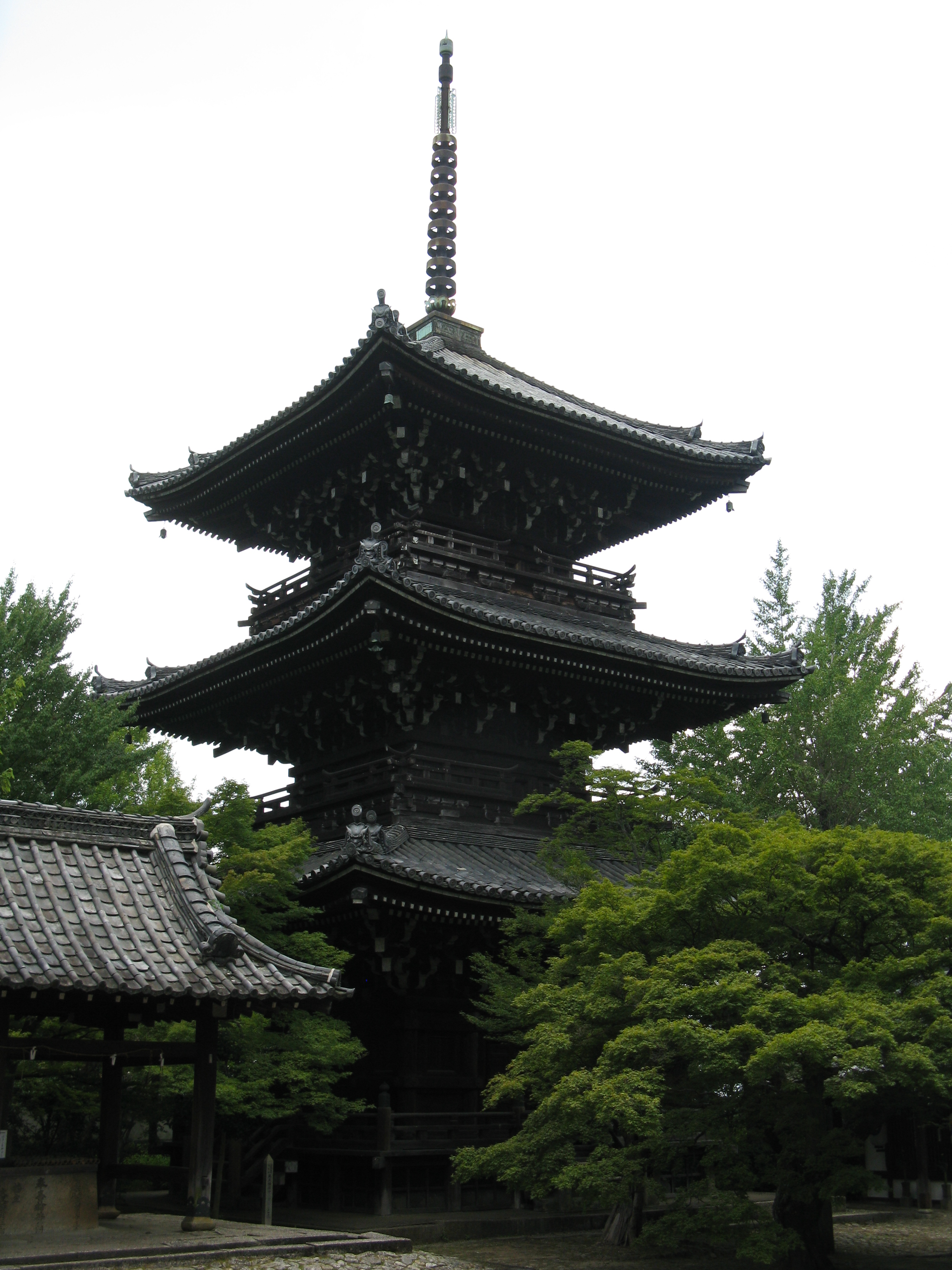

Religion
- Affiliation: Tendai
- Deity: Amitābha

Location
- Country: Japan
- Interactive map of Shinshōgokuraku-ji
- Coordinates: 35°01′19″N 135°47′26″E

Architecture
- Founder: Kaisan
- Established: 984 AD

Website
- shin-nyo-do.jp

Heart Sutra being recited at the temple

Shinshōgokuraku-ji (真正極楽寺) or Shinnyo-dō (真如堂) is a Buddhist Tendai temple in Kyoto. It was established in 984 AD by the monk Kaisan, who was originally from Enryaku-ji. The word gokuraku in its name refers to Sukhāvatī, the Pure Land of the West.

== See also ==
- Glossary of Japanese Buddhism
- List of National Treasures of Japan (writings)
