= Hakutsuru Fine Art Museum =

- 白鶴美術館
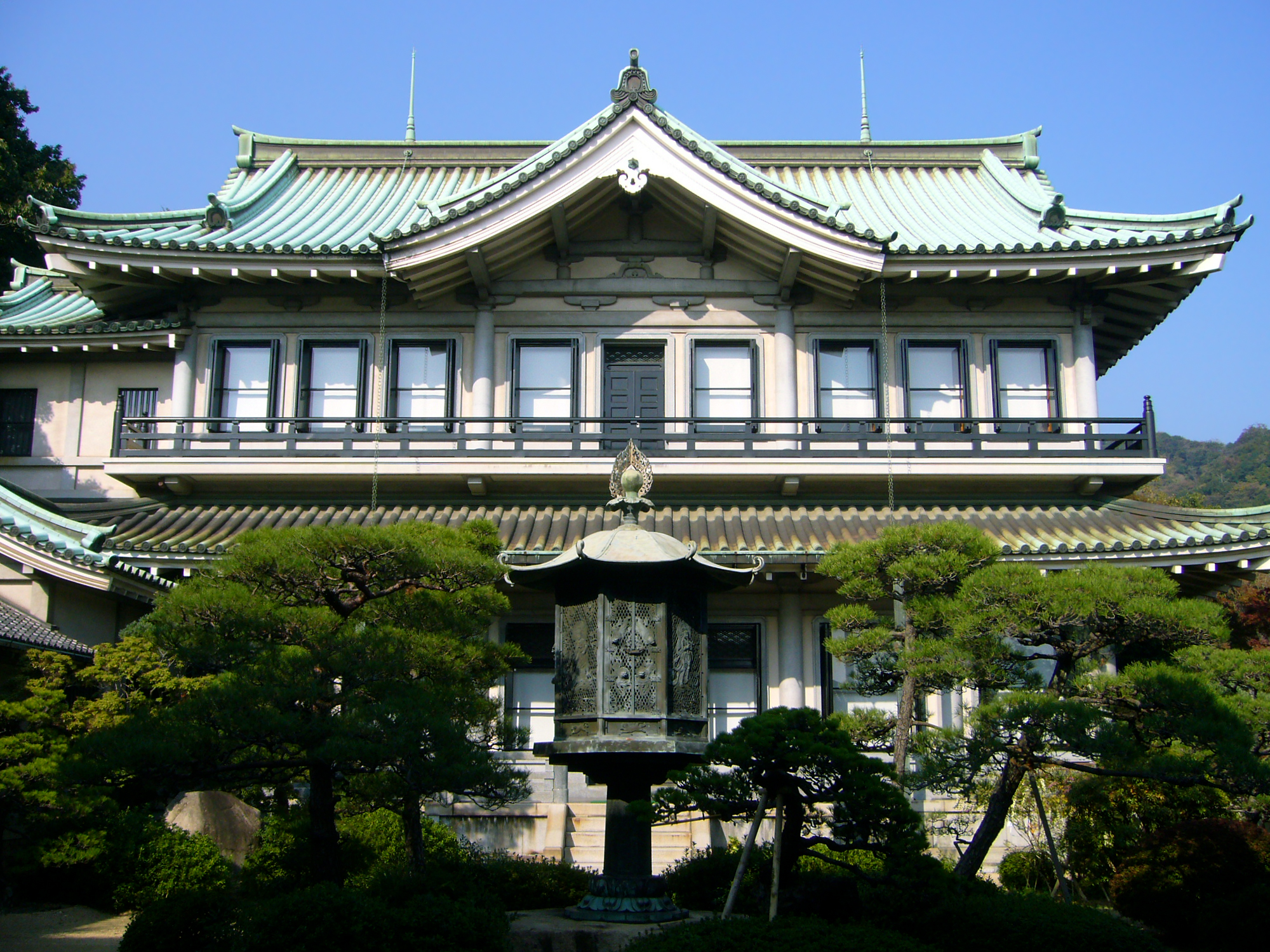
- Honkan (1934) (Registered Tangible Cultural Property)
- Interactive map of the Hakutsuru Fine Art Museum area

General information
- Location: 6-1-1 Sumiyoshi Yamate, Higashinada-ku, Kobe, Japan
- Coordinates: 34°43′51″N 135°15′30″E
- Opened: 1934

Website
- www.hakutsuru-museum.org (ja)

Hakutsuru Fine Art Museum (白鶴美術館, Hakutsuru Bijutsukan) opened in 1934 in Kobe, Hyōgo Prefecture, Japan to display the collection of Kanō Jihei, seventh head of the Hakutsu Sake Brewing Company (白鶴酒造). As such it was one of the first private museums in Japan. The collection of some 1450 items includes two National Treasures and twenty-two Important Cultural Properties.

== Collection ==
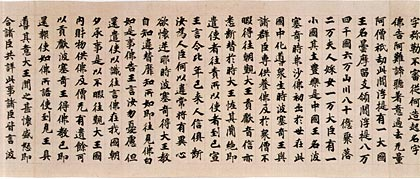
Sutra of the Wise and Foolish (National Treasure); two scrolls of the Nara period formerly the property of Tōdai-ji

The collection includes Chinese bronzes; Chinese ceramics; silverware, mirrors, and jewelry; writings; and paintings. The two National Treasures in the collection are two Nara-period scrolls from the Sutra of the Wise and Foolish attributed to Emperor Shōmu and seventy-one scrolls of the Nara to Edo periods of the Instruction manual on the Nirvana Sutra. There is also a gold necklace with jadeite magatama dating to the Kofun period (ICP).

== Buildings ==
The reinforced concrete Honkan (main building) with copper-tiled roof, earthen storeroom, and office building, all dating to 1934, and chashitsu or tea house of 1929 are Registered Tangible Cultural Properties. A new wing was opened in 1995 to exhibit Near Eastern carpets.

== See also ==
- List of National Treasures of Japan (writings: others)
- Kobe City Museum
- Hyōgo Prefectural Museum of Art
- Kobe City Museum of Literature
