= Lists of national treasures of Japan =

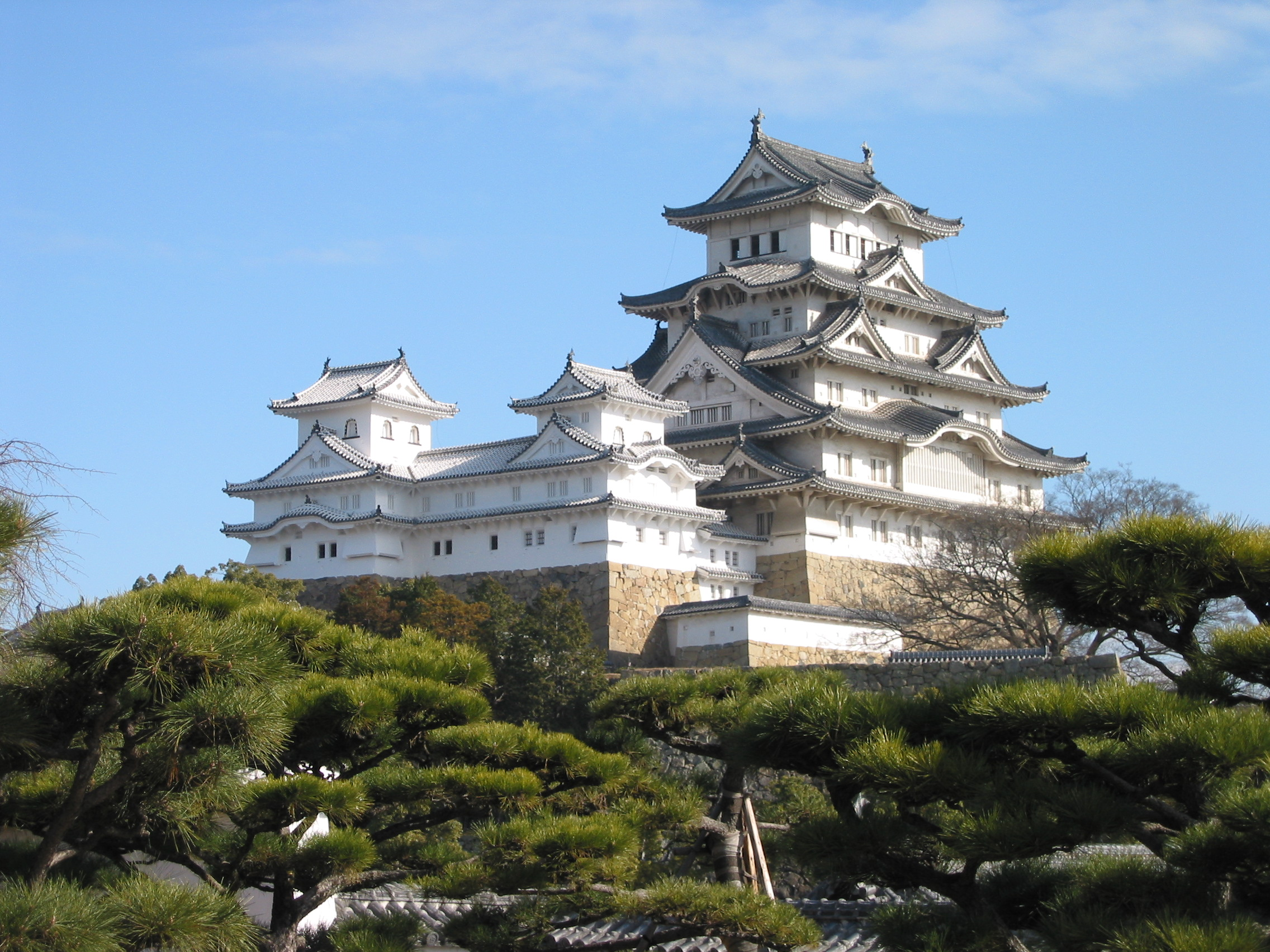
Himeji Castle The Keep Towers

The following lists cover different types of national treasures of Japan. They include buildings, fine arts and crafts.

== Buildings and structures ==
- List of national treasures of Japan (castles), for structures that are part of a castle
- List of national treasures of Japan (residences), for residential buildings and structures
- List of national treasures of Japan (shrines), for structures that are part of a Shinto shrine
- List of national treasures of Japan (temples), for structures that are part of a Buddhist temple
- List of national treasures of Japan (miscellaneous structures), for other structures and buildings

== Fine Arts and Crafts ==
- List of national treasures of Japan (ancient documents), for ancient documents
- List of national treasures of Japan (archaeological materials), for archaeological finds
- List of national treasures of Japan (crafts)
  - List of national treasures of Japan (crafts: swords), for craft items that are swords
  - List of national treasures of Japan (crafts: others), for craft items that are not swords
- List of national treasures of Japan (historical materials), for historical materials of various type
- List of national treasures of Japan (paintings), for paintings
- List of national treasures of Japan (sculptures), for sculptures
- List of national treasures of Japan (writings)
  - List of national treasures of Japan (writings: Classical Chinese books), for Chinese books
  - List of national treasures of Japan (writings: Japanese books), for Japanese books
  - List of national treasures of Japan (writings: others), for other written materials
