= Shōkadō Shōjō =

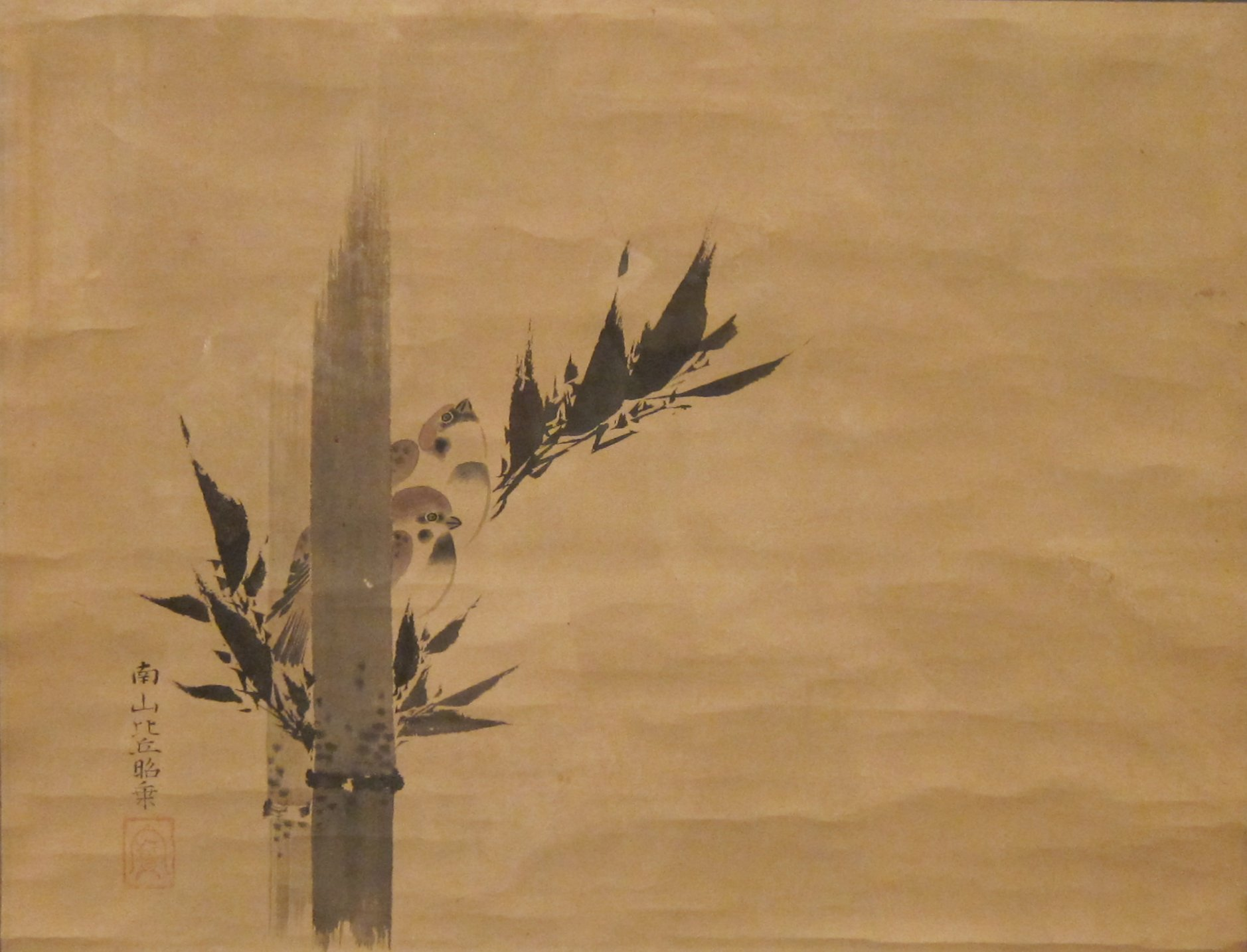
Bamboo and Sparrows by Shōkadō Shōjō, Honolulu Museum of Art

Shōkadō Shōjō (松花堂昭乗, 1584 Yamato Province, Japan-1639) was an Edo period Buddhist monk, painter, calligrapher and master of the tea ceremony. He is one of the "Three brushes of the Kan'ei period" (寛永三筆, Kan'ei Sanpitsu).

Shōjō is the Buddhist name the youth was given when he entered the Hachiman shrine on Otoko-yama (Yawata) near Kyoto. He later served the Konoe family under Konoe Nobutada. At that time, he also became acquainted with the Zen-monks of Daitoku-ji. In 1627, he became the head of the small Takimoto-bō temple on the slope of Otoko-yama (Mt. Otoko) which is south of Kyōto. Ten years later, in 1637, he retired to a hut on the temple's estate which he called "Pine Flower Hall" (松花堂, Shōkadō). This became the name under which he, and his school of followers, is best known.

In painting, his style would include monochromatic ink, following in the steps of Mu-ch’i Fa-ch’ang and Yin-t’o-lo (13th century Chinese monk-artist). He would also paint in the style of Yamato-e (Japanese painting) style.

== Accomplishments ==
Shōjō revived calligraphy by reawakening the sō (“grass”) writing style, which is a quick, cursive script originating from China, also practiced by Kōbō Daishi, a 9th century Japanese Shingon saint. Using this style of writing, he would go on to create a six-panelled folding screen covered with gold leaf as well as 16 love poems.
