= Masaki Art Museum =

- 正木美術館
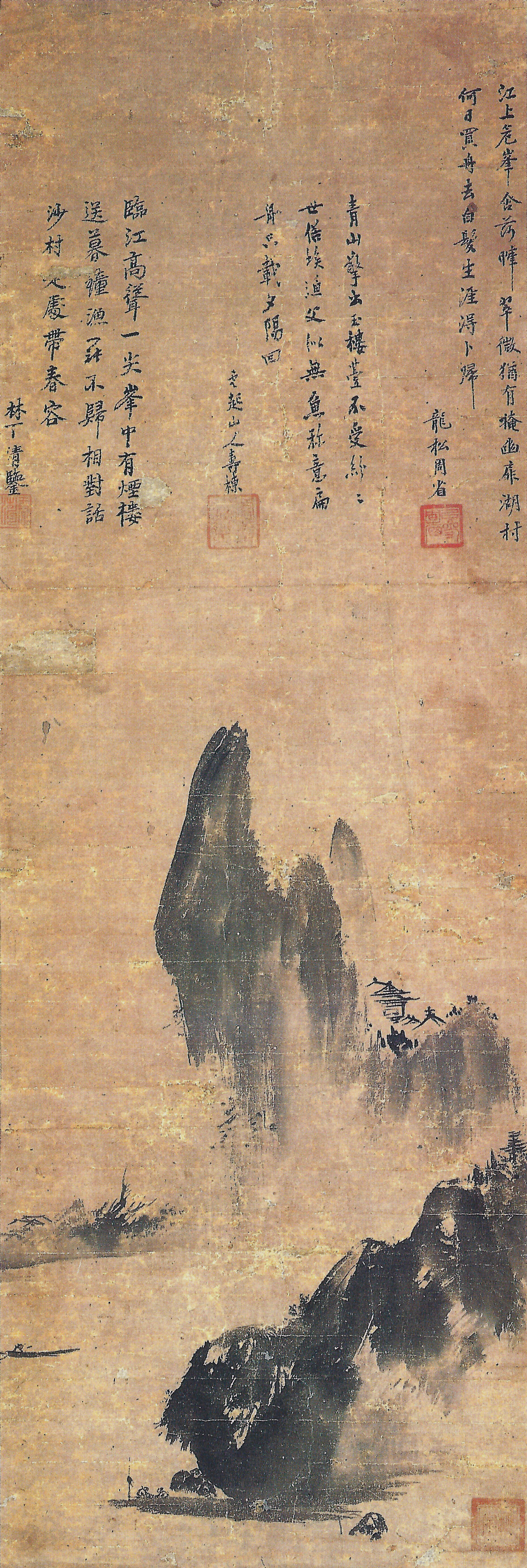
- Landscape by Sessō (ICP)
- Interactive map of the Masaki Art Museum area

General information
- Location: 2-9-26 Tadaokanaka, Tadaoka, Osaka Prefecture, Japan
- Coordinates: 34°29′41″N 135°23′32″E
- Opened: 1968

Website
- Official website

Masaki Art Museum (Japanese: 正木美術館, Hepburn: Masaki Bijutsukan) is an art museum in Tadaoka, Osaka Prefecture, Japan, that opened in 1968. The collection, built up by Masaki Takayuki (正木孝之), comprises some thirteen hundred works, including three National Treasures and twelve Important Cultural Properties.

== Gallery ==
Bokuseki
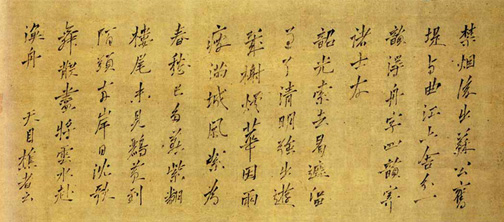
Meto Monrai bokuseki (Masaki Art Museum)

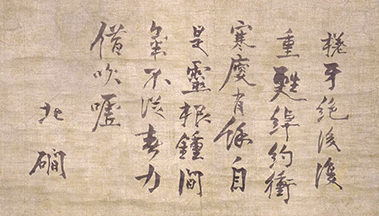
Bokukan Kyokan bokuseki (Masaki Art Museum)

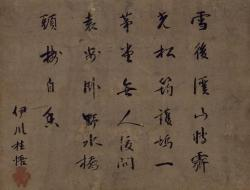
Ryoan Keigo bokuseki (Masaki Art Museum)

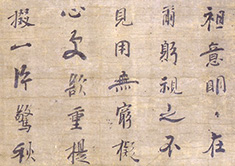
Kido Chiku bokuseki (Masaki Art Museum)

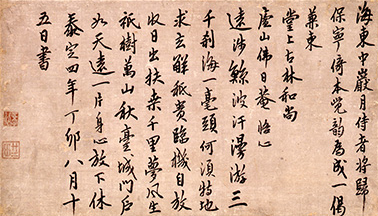
Jikuden Goshin bokuseki (Masaki Art Museum)

== See also ==
- Fujita Art Museum
- Kubosō Memorial Museum of Arts, Izumi
- List of National Treasures of Japan (writings: others)
- Bokuseki
