= Senboku District, Osaka =

District in Ōsaka prefecture, Japan

Coordinates: 34°29′N 135°23′E

Location of Senboku District in Osaka

Senboku (泉北郡, Senboku-gun) is a district located in Osaka Prefecture, Japan.

== Population ==
As of 2009, the district has an estimated population of 17,659 and a density of 4,380 persons per km^{2}. The total area is 4.03 km^{2}.

== Industry ==
There is a Liquefied natural gas terminal in Senboku. It is owned by Osaka Gas.

== Shrines ==
- Mitami Shrine

== Town ==
- Tadaoka
