= Sangō Shiiki =

Dialectic allegory

Sangō Shiiki (三教指帰) is a dialectic allegory written by Kūkai in 797. It is Japan's oldest comparative ideological critique.

At the time of writing, Kūkai was 24 years old. It is his debut work.

== Contents ==
The text is three volumes in length. It is written in a dialectic style comparing and critiquing Confucianism, Taoism, and Buddhism. Teachers from each school of thought attempt to educate a dissolute nephew Tokaku. In volume one, Kibō lectures on Confucianism. In volume two, Kyobō Inji critiques Confucianism from a Taoism position. Finally, in volume three, Kamei Kotsuji critiques Taoism from a Buddhist position. The conclusion is that Buddhism is the superior philosophy.

== Characters ==
The main characters appearing within the text were based on actual people:

- Kamei Kotsuji: Kūkai himself
- Tokaku: Saeki clan (佐伯氏)
- Kibō: Ato no Ōtari (阿刀大足)
- Kyobō: unclear but seems to be based on Sima Xiangru
