= List of cultural properties of Japan – paintings (Kanagawa) =

This list is of the cultural properties of Japan designated in the category of paintings (絵画, kaiga) for the Prefecture of Kanagawa.

== National Cultural Properties ==
As of 1 August 2019, fifty-one Important Cultural Properties (including six *National Treasures) have been designated, being of national significance.

Property	Date	Municipality	Ownership	Comments	Image	Dimensions	Coordinates	Ref.
*Rankei Dōryū, light colour on silk 絹本淡彩蘭溪道隆像 kenpon tansai Rankei Dōryū zō	1271	Kamakura	Kenchō-ji (kept at the Kamakura Museum of National Treasures)			104.8 centimetres (41.3 in) by 46.4 centimetres (18.3 in)	35°19′29″N 139°33′25″E	
*Pictorial Biography of Ippen Shōnin, colour on silk, by Hōgen Eni 絹本著色一遍上人絵伝〈法眼円伊筆／〉 kenpon chakushoku Ippen Shōnin e-den (Hōgen Eni hitsu)	1299	Fujisawa	Shōjōkō-ji	twelve scrolls			35°20′54″N 139°29′19″E	
*Hōjō Sanetoki, colour on silk *Hōjō Akitoki, colour on silk *Kanazawa Sadaaki, colour on silk *Kanazawa Tadamasa, colour on silk 絹本著色北条実時像 絹本著色北条顕時像 絹本著色金沢貞顕像 絹本著色金沢貞将像 kenpon chakushoku Hōjō Sanetoki zō kenpon chakushoku Hōjō Akitoki zō kenpon chakushoku Kanazawa Sadaaki zō kenpon chakushoku Kanazawa Tadamasa zō	Kamakura period	Yokohama	Shōmyō-ji (称名寺) (kept at Kanazawa Bunko)	four scrolls			35°20′38″N 139°37′43″E	
*Ten Expediences, light colour on paper, by Ike no Taiga; *Ten Merits, light colour on paper, by Yosa Buson 紙本淡彩十便図〈池大雅筆／〉 紙本淡彩十宣図〈与謝蕪村筆／〉 shihon tansai jūben zu (Ike no Taiga hitsu) shihon tansai jugi zu (Yosa Buson hitsu)	1771	Kamakura	Kawabata Yasunari Memorial Association (川端康成記念会) (kept at the Kawabata Yasunari Memorial Hall (川端康成記念館))	one album		17.7 centimetres (7.0 in) by 17.7 centimetres (7.0 in)	35°18′50″N 139°32′13″E	
*Legends of the Taima Mandala, colour on paper 紙本著色当麻曼荼羅縁起 shihon chakushoku Taima mandara engi	Kamakura period	Kamakura	Kōmyō-ji (kept at the Kamakura Museum of National Treasures)	two emakimono		51.5 centimetres (20.3 in) by 796.7 centimetres (26 ft 1.7 in) and 689.8 centimetres (22 ft 7.6 in)	35°19′29″N 139°33′25″E	
*Frozen Clouds, Sifted Snow, ink on paper, by Uragami Gyokudō 紙本墨画凍雲篩雪図〈浦上玉堂筆／〉 shihon bokuga tōun shisetsu zu (Uragami Gyokudō hitsu)	Edo period	Kamakura	Kawabata Yasunari Memorial Association (川端康成記念会) (kept at the Kawabata Yasunari Memorial Hall (川端康成記念館))			133.3 centimetres (52.5 in) by 56.6 centimetres (22.3 in)	35°18′50″N 139°32′13″E	
Hōjō Sōun, light colour on silk 絹本淡彩北条早雲像 kenpon tansai Hōjō Sōun zō	Muromachi period	Hakone	Sōun-ji (早雲寺)				35°13′48″N 139°06′13″E	
Amida Nyorai, colour on silk 絹本著色阿弥陀如来像 kenpon chakushoku Amida Nyorai zō	Kamakura period	Tokyo	Hōshin-ji (報身寺) (kept at Tokyo National Museum)				35°43′08″N 139°46′36″E	
Ikō Shōnin, ink and light colour on paper 絹本著色一向上人像 kenpon chakushoku Ikō Shōnin zō	Kamakura period	Fujisawa	Shōjōkō-ji				35°20′54″N 139°29′19″E	
Kokūzō Bosatsu, colour on silk 絹本著色虚空蔵菩薩像 kenpon chakushoku Kokūzō Bosatsu zō	Kamakura period	Kamakura	Engaku-ji (kept at the Kamakura Museum of National Treasures)				35°19′29″N 139°33′25″E	
Five Hundred Arhats, colour on silk 絹本著色五百羅漢像 kenpon chakushoku gohyaku rakan zō	Yuan dynasty	Kamakura	Engaku-ji (kept at the Kamakura Museum of National Treasures)	thirty-three scrolls			35°19′29″N 139°33′25″E	
Emperor Go-Daigo, colour on silk 絹本著色後醍醐天皇御像 kenpon chakushoku Go-Daigo tennō mizō	Nanboku-chō period	Fujisawa	Shōjōkō-ji				35°20′54″N 139°29′19″E	
Shaka Triad, colour on silk 絹本著色釈迦三尊像 kenpon chakushoku Shaka Nyorai zō	Southern Song	Kamakura	Kenchō-ji (kept at the Kamakura Museum of National Treasures)			131.6 centimetres (51.8 in) by 82.8 centimetres (32.6 in)	35°19′29″N 139°33′25″E	
Ten Kings of Hell, colour on silk 絹本著色十王図 kenpon chakushoku jū-ō zu	Southern Song	Yokohama	Kanagawa Prefectural Museum of Cultural History	ten scrolls			35°26′57″N 139°38′10″E	
Twelve Heavenly Generals, colour on silk 絹本著色十二神将像 kenpon chakushoku jūni shinshō zō	Kamakura period	Yokohama	Shōmyō-ji (称名寺) (kept at Kanazawa Bunko)	twelve scrolls			35°20′38″N 139°37′43″E	
Eighteen Arhats and a Monk, colour on silk 絹本著色十八羅漢及僧像 kenpon chakushoku jūhachi rakan oyobi sō zō	Kamakura period	Kamakura	Kōmyō-ji (kept at the Kamakura Museum of National Treasures)	nineteen scrolls		120.0 centimetres (47.2 in) by 48.5 centimetres (19.1 in)	35°19′29″N 139°33′25″E	
Sixteen Arhats, colour on silk 絹本著色十六羅漢像 kenpon chakushoku jūroku rakan zō	Muromachi period	Kamakura	Kenchō-ji (kept at the Kamakura Museum of National Treasures)	eight scrolls		143.9 centimetres (56.7 in) by 83.0 centimetres (32.7 in)	35°19′29″N 139°33′25″E	
Keizan Jōkin, colour on silk 絹本著色紹瑾和尚像 kenpon chakushoku Shōkin Oshō zō	1319	Yokohama	Sōji-ji			89.2 centimetres (35.1 in) by 38.6 centimetres (15.2 in)	35°18′14″N 139°33′16″E	
Shinkai, colour on silk 絹本著色審海像 kenpon chakushoku Shinkai zō	Kamakura period	Yokohama	Shōmyō-ji (称名寺) (kept at Kanazawa Bunko)				35°20′38″N 139°37′43″E	
Wife of Maeda Toshiie, colour on silk 絹本著色前田利家夫人像 kenpon chakushoku Maeda Toshiie fujin zō	Momoyama period	Yokohama	Sōji-ji			101.1 centimetres (39.8 in) by 50.3 centimetres (19.8 in)	35°18′14″N 139°33′16″E	
Daikaku Zenji, colour on silk 絹本著色大覚禅師像 kenpon chakushoku Daikaku Zenji zō	Kamakura period	Kamakura	Kenchō-ji (kept at the Kamakura Museum of National Treasures)	alternatively dated to the Yuan			35°19′29″N 139°33′25″E	
Daikaku Zenji, colour on silk 絹本著色大覚禅師像〈／経行像〉 kenpon chakushoku Daikaku Zenji zō (kyōgyō zō)	Kamakura period	Kamakura	Kenchō-ji (kept at the Kamakura Museum of National Treasures)	"walking meditation portrait"			35°19′29″N 139°33′25″E	
Portrait said to be of Hōjō Saneyasu, colour on silk 絹本著色伝北条実泰像 kenpon chakushoku den-Hōjō Saneyasu zō	Kamakura period	Yokohama	Shōmyō-ji (称名寺) (kept at Kanazawa Bunko)				35°20′38″N 139°37′43″E	
Taima Mandala, colour on silk 絹本著色当麻曼荼羅図 kenpon chakushoku Taima mandara zu	Kamakura period	Kamakura	Kōmyō-ji (kept at the Kamakura Museum of National Treasures)			147.6 centimetres (58.1 in) by 143.3 centimetres (56.4 in)	35°19′29″N 139°33′25″E	
Ninshō, colour on silk 絹本著色忍性像 kenpon chakushoku Ninshō zō	Kamakura period	Yokohama	Shōmyō-ji (称名寺) (kept at Kanazawa Bunko)				35°20′38″N 139°37′43″E	
Shian Oshō, colour on silk 絹本著色之庵和尚像 kenpon chakushoku Shian Oshō zō	1333	Kamakura	Kigen-in (帰源院) (subtemple of Engaku-ji) (kept at the Kamakura Museum of National Treasures)				35°19′29″N 139°33′25″E	
Hooded Jizō, colour on silk 絹本著色被帽地蔵菩薩像 kenpon chakushoku hibō Jizō bosatsu zō	Goryeo	Kamakura	Engaku-ji	Goryeo Buddhist painting; alternatively ascribed to the Yuan		239.4 centimetres (7 ft 10.3 in) by 130.0 centimetres (4 ft 3.2 in)	35°20′12″N 139°32′52″E	
Bukkoku Kokushi, colour on silk 絹本著色仏光国師像 kenpon chakushoku Bukkoku Kokushi zō	1284	Kamakura	Engaku-ji (kept at the Kamakura Museum of National Treasures)				35°19′29″N 139°33′25″E	
Buddha's Parinirvana, colour on silk 絹本著色仏涅槃図 kenpon chakushoku Butsu nehan zu	Kamakura period	Kamakura	Engaku-ji (kept at the Kamakura Museum of National Treasures)				35°19′29″N 139°33′25″E	
Musō Kokushi, colour on silk 絹本著色夢窓国師像 kenpon chakushoku Musō Kokushi zō	Kamakura period	Kamakura	Ōbai-in (黄梅院) (subtemple of Engaku-ji) (kept at the Kamakura Museum of National Treasures)				35°19′29″N 139°33′25″E	
Kannon, ink on silk 絹本墨画観音像 kenpon bokuga Kannon zu	Muromachi period	Kamakura	Kenchō-ji (kept at the Kamakura Museum of National Treasures)	thirty-two scrolls		128.5 centimetres (50.6 in) by 51.8 centimetres (20.4 in)	35°19′29″N 139°33′25″E	
Sixteen Arhats, ink and light colour on silk 絹本墨画淡彩十六羅漢像 kenpon bokuga tansai jūroku rakan zō	Yuan dynasty	Yokohama	Shōmyō-ji (称名寺) (kept at Kanazawa Bunko)	sixteen scrolls			35°20′38″N 139°37′43″E	
Shōki, light colour on paper, by Yamada Dōan 紙本淡彩鍾馗図〈山田道安筆／〉 shihon tansai Shōki zu (Yamada Dōan hitsu)	Muromachi period	Kamakura	Engaku-ji (kept at the Kamakura Museum of National Treasures)				35°19′29″N 139°33′25″E	
Hōyaki Amida Engi, light colour on paper 紙本淡彩頬燒阿弥陀縁起 shihon tansai hōyaki Amida engi	Kamakura period	Kamakura	Kōsoku-ji (光触寺) (kept at the Kamakura Museum of National Treasures)	two hand scrolls			35°19′29″N 139°33′25″E	
Battabara, light colour on paper, by Sōen 紙本淡彩跋陀婆羅像〈宗淵筆／〉 shihon tansai Battabara zō (Sōen hitsu)	Muromachi period	Kamakura	Engaku-ji (kept at the Kamakura Museum of National Treasures)				35°19′29″N 139°33′25″E	
Gyokuin Oshō, colour on paper 紙本著色玉隠和尚像 shihon chakushoku Gyokuin Oshō zō	Muromachi period	Kamakura	Meigetsu-in (kept at the Kamakura Museum of National Treasures)				35°19′29″N 139°33′25″E	
Fragment of the Murasaki Shikibu Diary Ekotoba, colour on paper 紙本著色紫式部日記絵詞残闕 shihon chakushoku Murasaki Shikibu nikki ekotoba zanketsu	Kamakura period	Kamakura	private					
Five Pure Land Patriarchs, colour on paper (Shandao) 紙紙本著色浄土五祖絵〈／（善導巻）〉 shihon chakushoku Jōdo goso-e (Zendō maki)	Nanboku-chō period	Kamakura	Kōmyō-ji (kept at the Kamakura Museum of National Treasures)	one emakimono			35°19′29″N 139°33′25″E	
Pictorial Biography of the Five Pure Land Patriarchs, colour on paper 紙本著色浄土五祖絵伝 shihon chakushoku Jōdo goso eden	1305	Kamakura	Kōmyō-ji (kept at the Kamakura Museum of National Treasures)	one emakimono		990.4 centimetres (32 ft 5.9 in) by 33.0 centimetres (13.0 in)	35°19′29″N 139°33′25″E	
Devadatta, colour on paper 紙本著色提婆達多像 shihon chakushoku Daibadatta zō	late Goryeo	Kamakura	Sōji-ji			50.2 centimetres (19.8 in) by 91.6 centimetres (36.1 in)	35°18′14″N 139°33′16″E	
Legends of the Hakone Gongen, colour on paper 紙本著色箱根権現縁起 shihon chakushoku Hakone Gongen engi	Nanboku-chō period	Hakone	Hakone Jinja	one emakimono			35°14′37″N 139°03′26″E	
Kikō Zenji, ink on paper 紙本墨画喜江禅師像 shihon bokuga Kikō Zenji zō	Muromachi period	Kamakura	Kenchō-ji (kept at the Kamakura Museum of National Treasures)				35°19′29″N 139°33′25″E	
Miroku Raigō, colour on wooden boards Pure Land of Miroku, colour on wooden boards 板絵著色弥勒来迎図 板絵著色弥勒浄土図 ita-e chakushoku Miroku raigō zu ita-e chakushoku Miroku jōdo zu	Kamakura period	Yokohama	Shōmyō-ji (称名寺)				35°20′39″N 139°37′49″E	
Figures with Birds and Flowers, colour on paper by Tōshun, six-fold byōbu 紙本著色花鳥人物図〈等春筆／六曲屏風（十一図）〉 shihon chakushoku kachō zu (Tōshun hitsu rokkyoku byōbu jūichi zu)	Muromachi period	Kawasaki	private	pair of screens; eleven images				
Seeing off a High Priest, Returning Home Beyond the Seas, light colour on paper 紙本淡彩送海東上人帰国図 shihon tansai sōkaitō shōnin kikoku zu	c. 1194 (Southern Song)	Taitō	Tokiwayama Bunko (kept at Tokyo National Museum)	inscribed by Zhong Tangjie (鍾唐傑) and Dou Congzhou (竇従周)		63.6 centimetres (25.0 in) by 36.3 centimetres (14.3 in)	35°43′08″N 139°46′36″E	
Returning Home, light colour on paper 紙本淡彩帰郷省親図 shihon tansai kikyō shōshin zu	Muromachi period	Taitō	Tokiwayama Bunko (kept at Tokyo National Museum)	inscribed by thirteen monks		83.9 centimetres (33.0 in) by 25.7 centimetres (10.1 in)	35°43′08″N 139°46′36″E	
Inuōmono, colour on paper with gold ground, six-fold byōbu 紙本金地著色犬追物図 六曲屏風 shihon tansai kinji chakushoku inuōmono zu rokkyoku byōbu	Azuchi–Momoyama period	Kamakura	Tokiwayama Bunko	pair of screens			35°18′57″N 139°32′34″E	
Kakinomoto no Hitomaro, by Takuma Eiga, colour on silk 絹本著色柿本人麿像〈詫磨栄賀筆／〉 kenpon chakushoku Kakinomoto no Hitomaro zō (Takuma Eiga hitsu)	1395	Taitō	Tokiwayama Bunko (kept at Tokyo National Museum)			84.3 centimetres (33.2 in) by 41.3 centimetres (16.3 in)	35°43′08″N 139°46′36″E	
Shide, ink on paper 紙本墨画拾得図 shihon bokuga Jittoku zu	Yuan dynasty	Taitō	Tokiwayama Bunko (kept at Tokyo National Museum)	inscribed by Huyan Jingfu (虎巌浄伏)		78.9 centimetres (31.1 in) by 32.4 centimetres (12.8 in)	35°43′08″N 139°46′36″E	
Crested Myna, ink on paper, by Sesson 紙本墨画叭々鳥図〈雪村筆／〉 shihon bokuga hahachō zu (Sesson hitsu)	C16	Taitō	Tokiwayama Bunko (kept at Tokyo National Museum)				35°43′08″N 139°46′36″E	
Eight-Letter Monju Mandala, colour on silk 絹本著色八字文殊曼荼羅図 kenpon chakushoku hachi-ji Monju mandara zu	Kamakura period	Kamakura	private					

== Prefectural Cultural Properties ==
As of 1 August 2019, forty-two properties have been designated at a prefectural level.

Property	Date	Municipality	Ownership	Comments	Image	Dimensions	Coordinates	Ref.
Mountain Cherries, on wooden boards, by Andō Hiroshige 板絵著色山桜図 安藤広重筆 ita-e chakushoku yamazakura zu Andō Hiroshige hitsu	C19	Yokohama	Senkoku-ji (泉谷寺)	eight panels			35°30′22″N 139°35′07″E	for all refs see
Senju Kannon with Twenty-Eight Attendants, colour on silk 絹本著色千手観音二十八部衆像 kenpon chakushoku Senju Kannon nijūhachi-bushū zō	late Kamakura period	Yokohama	Gumyō-ji (弘明寺)				35°25′27″N 139°35′51″E	
Mandala of the Two Realms, colour on silk 絹本著色両界曼荼羅図 kenpon chakushoku ryōkai mandara zu	late Kamakura period	Yokohama	Hōkoku-ji (kept at Kanagawa Prefectural Museum of Cultural History)	pair of scrolls			35°26′57″N 139°38′10″E	
Hachiman in Priestly Attire, colour on silk 絹本著色僧形八幡神像 kenpon chakushoku sōgyō Hachiman shinzō	late Kamakura period	Yokohama	Shōmyō-ji (称名寺) (kept at Kanazawa Bunko)				35°20′38″N 139°37′43″E	
Portrait said to be of Nanzan Oshō, colour on silk 絹本著色伝南山和尚像 kenpon chakushoku den-Nanzan Oshō zō	late Kamakura period	Yokohama	Shōmyō-ji (称名寺) (kept at Kanazawa Bunko)				35°20′38″N 139°37′43″E	
Portrait said to be of Reishi Oshō, colour on silk 絹本著色伝霊芝和尚像 kenpon chakushoku den-Reishi Oshō zō	late Kamakura period	Yokohama	Shōmyō-ji (称名寺) (kept at Kanazawa Bunko)				35°20′38″N 139°37′43″E	
Seed Syllable Aizen Myōō, colour on silk 絹本著色種子愛染明王図 kenpon chakushoku shuji Aizen Myōō zō	late Kamakura period	Yokohama	Shōmyō-ji (称名寺) (kept at Kanazawa Bunko)				35°20′38″N 139°37′43″E	
Enma-ten Mandala, colour on silk 絹本著色焔魔天曼荼羅図 kenpon chakushoku Enma-ten mandara zu	late Kamakura period	Yokohama	Shōmyō-ji (称名寺) (kept at Kanazawa Bunko)				35°20′38″N 139°37′43″E	
Three Thousand Buddhas, colour on silk 絹本著色三千佛像 kenpon chakushoku sanzen Butsu zō	Nanboku-chō period	Yokohama	Shōmyō-ji (称名寺) (kept at Kanazawa Bunko)				35°20′38″N 139°37′43″E	
Thousand Buddhas, colour on silk 絹本著色千体佛像 kenpon chakushoku sendai Butsu zō	Nanboku-chō period	Yokohama	Shōmyō-ji (称名寺) (kept at Kanazawa Bunko)	pair of scrolls			35°20′38″N 139°37′43″E	
Flowers and Birds, colour on silk 絹本著色花鳥図 kenpon chakushoku kachō zu	Ming	Kamakura	Hōkoku-ji (kept at the Kamakura Museum of National Treasures)	pair of scrolls			35°19′29″N 139°33′25″E	
High Priest, colour on silk 絹本著色高僧像 kenpon chakushoku kōsō zō	Nanboku-chō period	Yokohama	Shōmyō-ji (称名寺)	pair of scrolls			35°20′39″N 139°37′49″E	
Ippen Shōnin, ink and light colour on paper 紙本墨画淡彩一遍上人像 [清浄光寺] shihon bokuga tansai Ippen Shōnin zō	Muromachi period	Fujisawa	Shōjōkō-ji				35°20′54″N 139°29′19″E	
Nichiren Shōnin, colour on silk 絹本著色日蓮上人像 kenpon chakushoku Nichiren Shōnin zō	Momoyama period	Kamakura	Jōei-ji (浄永寺) (kept at the Kamakura Museum of National Treasures)			119 centimetres (47 in) by 76.5 centimetres (30.1 in)	35°19′29″N 139°33′25″E	
Daiitoku Myōō, colour on silk 絹本著色大威徳明王像 kenpon chakushoku Daiitoku Myōō zō	late Kamakura period	Zushi	Jinmu-ji (神武寺)				35°18′15″N 139°36′22″E	
Senju Kannon, colour on silk 絹本著色千手観音像 kenpon chakushoku Senju Kannon zō	late Kamakura period	Zushi	Jinmu-ji (神武寺)				35°18′15″N 139°36′22″E	
Beautiful Women, colour on wooden boards, ema by Utagawa Kunitsune 板絵著色歌川国経筆美人図絵馬 ita-e chakushoku Utagawa Kunitsune hitsu bijin zu ema	1802	Isehara	Hibita Jinja (比比多神社)				35°24′57″N 139°16′47″E	
Hōjō Ujitsuna, colour on paper 紙本著色北條氏綱像 shihon chakushoku Hōjō Ujitsuna zō	Momoyama period	Hakone	Sōun-ji (早雲寺)				35°13′48″N 139°06′13″E	
Hōjō Ujiyasu, colour on paper 紙本著色北條氏康像 shihon chakushoku Hōjō Ujiyasu zō	Edo period	Hakone	Sōun-ji (早雲寺)				35°13′48″N 139°06′13″E	
Small bird and loquats, colour on paper 紙本著色枇杷小禽図 shihon chakushoku biwa shōkin zu	Muromachi period	Hakone	Sōun-ji (早雲寺)				35°13′48″N 139°06′13″E	
Painted Fusuma from the Sōun-ji Hondō, ink on paper 紙本墨画早雲寺本堂襖絵 shihon bokuga Sōunji hondō fusuma-e	Edo period	Hakone	Sōun-ji (早雲寺)	thirty-eight panels			35°13′48″N 139°06′13″E	
Arhats, ink on paper 紙本墨画羅漢図 shihon bokuga rakan zu	Edo period	Hakone	Sōun-ji (早雲寺)	three scrolls			35°13′48″N 139°06′13″E	
Women spinning and weaving, ink and light colour on paper 紙本墨画淡彩機婦図 shihon bokuga tansai kifu zu	late Muromachi/Momoyama period	Hakone	Sōun-ji (早雲寺)	pair of scrolls			35°13′48″N 139°06′13″E	
Sixteen Arhats, light colour on paper, by Kusumi Morikage 紙本淡彩十六羅漢図 久隅守景筆 shihon tansai jūroku rakan zu Kusumi Morikage hitsu	C17	Sagamihara	Kōmyō-ji (光明寺)				35°33′55″N 139°14′18″E	
Kumano Gongen, colour on silk 絹本著色熊野権現影向図 kenpon chakushoku Kumano gongen yōgō zu	Muromachi period	Sagamihara	Shōnen-ji (正念寺)				35°36′17″N 139°08′01″E	

== Municipal Cultural Properties ==
As of 1 August 2019, a further one hundred and sixty-four properties have been designated as being of municipal importance.

== See also ==
- Cultural Properties of Japan
- List of National Treasures of Japan (paintings)
- Japanese painting
- List of Historic Sites of Japan (Kanagawa)
- List of Cultural Properties of Japan - historical materials (Kanagawa)
