= List of cultural properties of Japan – historical materials (Kanagawa) =

This list is of the cultural properties of Japan designated in the category of historical materials (歴史資料, rekishi shiryō) for the Prefecture of Kanagawa.

== National Cultural Properties ==
As of 1 August 2015, six Important Cultural Properties have been designated, being of national significance.

Property	Date	Municipality	Ownership	Comments	Image	Coordinates	Ref.
Steam hammers from the former Yokosuka Ironworks スチームハンマー（旧横須賀製鉄所設置）〈／一八六五年、オランダ製〉 suchīmu hanmā (kyū-Yokosuka seitetsusho setchi)	1865	Yokosuka	Verny Memorial Museum (ヴェルニー記念館)	two machines; manufactured in the Netherlands		35°17′05″N 139°39′22″E	
The film "Farewell of Nanko" 映画フィルム「楠公訣別」 eiga firumu Nankō ketsubetsu	1920-28	Sagamihara	Sagamihara Branch, National Film Centre, National Museum of Modern Art, Tokyo	one roll		35°33′36″N 139°23′39″E	
Images from the construction of the Engaku-ji Butsuden 円覚寺仏殿造営図; Engakuji Butsuden zōei zu	1573	Kamakura	Kamakura Museum of National Treasures	two items		35°19′29″N 139°33′26″E	
Daguerreotype of Endō Matazaemon and retainers, by Eliphalet Brown, Jr. 銀板写真（遠藤又左衛門と従者像）〈エリファレット・ブラウン・ジュニア撮影／一八五四年〉 ginban shashin (Endō Matazaemon to jūnsha zō) (Erifaretto Buraun junia satsuei 1854 nen)	1854	Yokohama	Yokohama Museum of Art	one image		35°27′25″N 139°37′50″E	
Plan of Tsurugaoka Hachimangū 鶴岡八幡宮指図〈／天正十九年五月十四日〉 Tsuruoka hachimangū sashizu (Tenshō jūkunen gogatsu jūyōka)	1591	Kamakura	Tsurugaoka Hachimangū			35°19′34″N 139°33′23″E	
Map of Japan 日本図（遠江、越後以東欠） Nihon zu (Tōtōmi, Echigo itō ketsu)	Kamakura period	Yokohama	Shōmyō-ji (称名寺) (kept at Kanazawa Bunko)	half of the map, east of Tōtōmi and Echigo Provinces, is missing		35°20′38″N 139°37′43″E	

== Prefectural Cultural Properties ==
As of September 2014, one property has been designated at a prefectural level.

Property	Date	Municipality	Ownership	Comments	Image	Coordinates	Ref.
Materials relating to Ninomiya Sontoku 二宮尊徳関係資料; Ninomiya Sontoku kankei shiryō	Edo period	Odawara	Hōtoku Museum (報徳博物館), Sontoku Memorial Museum (尊徳記念館), Hōtoku Ninomiya Jinja (報徳二宮神社)	3,872 items		35°14′56″N 139°09′12″E	

== See also ==
- Cultural Properties of Japan
- List of Historic Sites of Japan (Kanagawa)
- Sagami Province, Musashi Province
- Kanagawa Prefectural Museum of Cultural History
- List of National Treasures of Japan (historical materials)
- List of Cultural Properties of Japan - paintings (Kanagawa)
