= Tokiwayama Bunko =

Japanese art collection foundation

Public Interest Incorporated Foundation Tokiwayama Bunko
- 公益財団法人 常盤山文庫
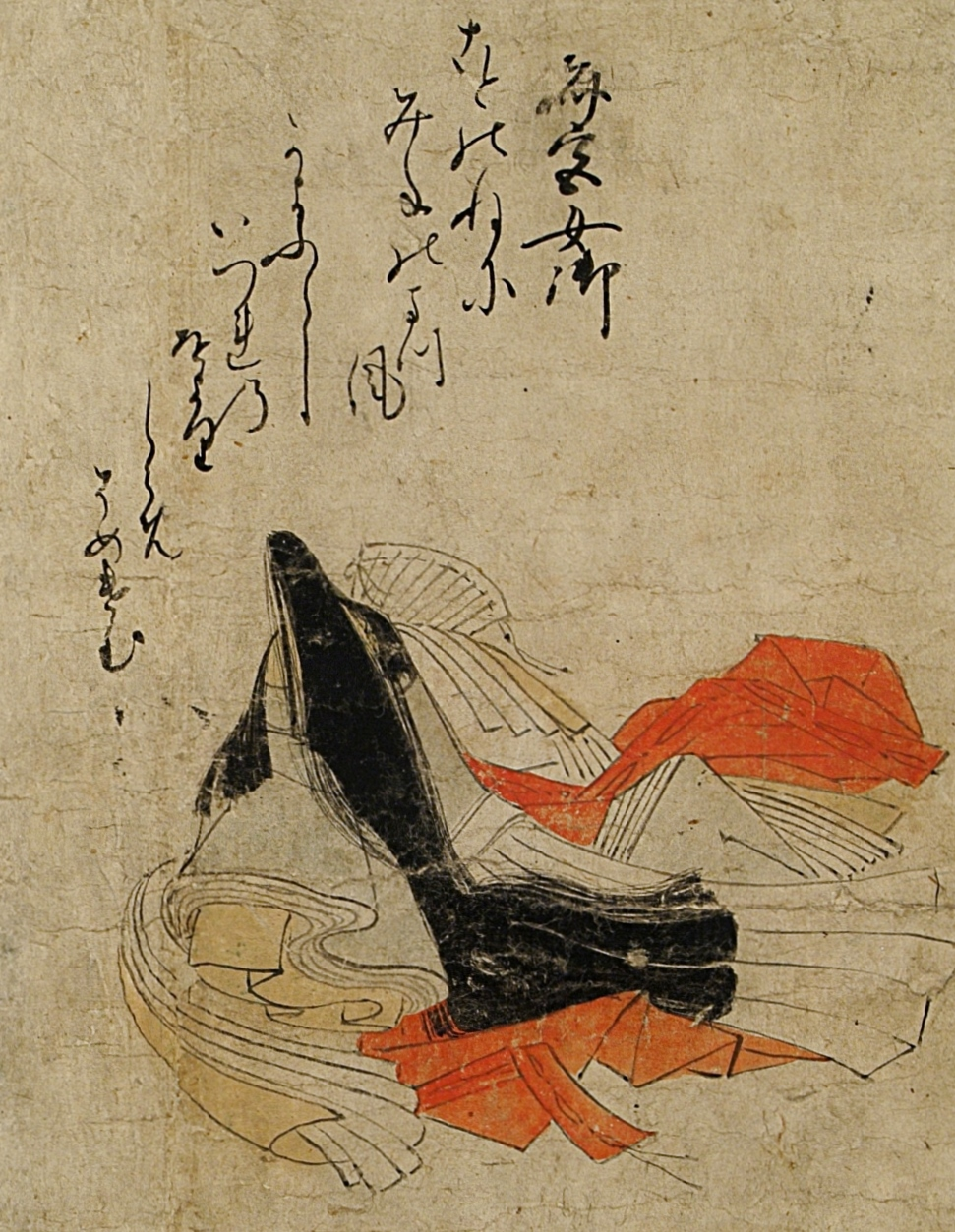
- Saigū no Nyōgo
- Formation: 1954 (Public Interest Incorporated Foundation since 2012)
- Founder: Tsûsai Sugawara
- Locations: 4-3 Sasame-machi, Kamakura; 4-26-18 Minamiaoyama, Minato
- Website: tokiwayama.org

Tokiwayama Bunko (常盤山文庫) is a Japanese foundation with an important collection of Japanese and Chinese art, in particular ceramics, calligraphic works, and paintings. Established by Tsûsai Sugawara in 1954, this includes two National Treasures, twenty-three Important Cultural Properties (six paintings, sixteen calligraphic works/old documents/classical texts, one Muromachi-period red lacquered bowl), and eighteen Important Art Objects. The foundation possesses one of the largest collections of bokuseki calligraphy, ceramics, and religious arts in Japan.

Tsûsai Sugawara (1894–1981), a popular cultural figure in Japan, started collecting in 1943 and in 1954 established the Tokiwayama Bunko ("library") Foundation, named for the area of Kamakura where he had his private residence. Initially a physical gallery was opened to the public, consisting of multiple wooden buildings on Sugawara's estate, but amendments to the Law for the Protection of Cultural Properties necessitated the closure of the vulnerable structures after Sugawara died. The foundation, which now is based in Tokyo, began operating solely by exhibiting and loaning its works at and to other institutions in Japan and overseas, in particular the Kamakura Museum of National Treasures and Tokyo National Museum, as well as making materials available for academic purposes. In recent years there has been a particular emphasis on research and publications relating to Chinese ceramics.

Sugawara's son Hisao (1923-2008, also known as Toshio), who served as director of the Nezu Museum, led the foundation for many years. Hisao's nephew Ken, a grandson of Tsûsai, is its current director.

According to Hisao Sugawara, his father's collection "grew rather naturally and casually, following [his] personal desire and taste." Therefore, he stated, the objects allow observers to learn not only about the art but also "much about the collector himself."

== See also ==
- List of National Treasures of Japan (writings: others)
- List of Cultural Properties of Japan - paintings (Kanagawa)
- Kanazawa Bunko
