= Hōkoku-ji =

Buddhist temple in Kamakura, Japan

Coordinates: 35.3200°N 139.5693°E

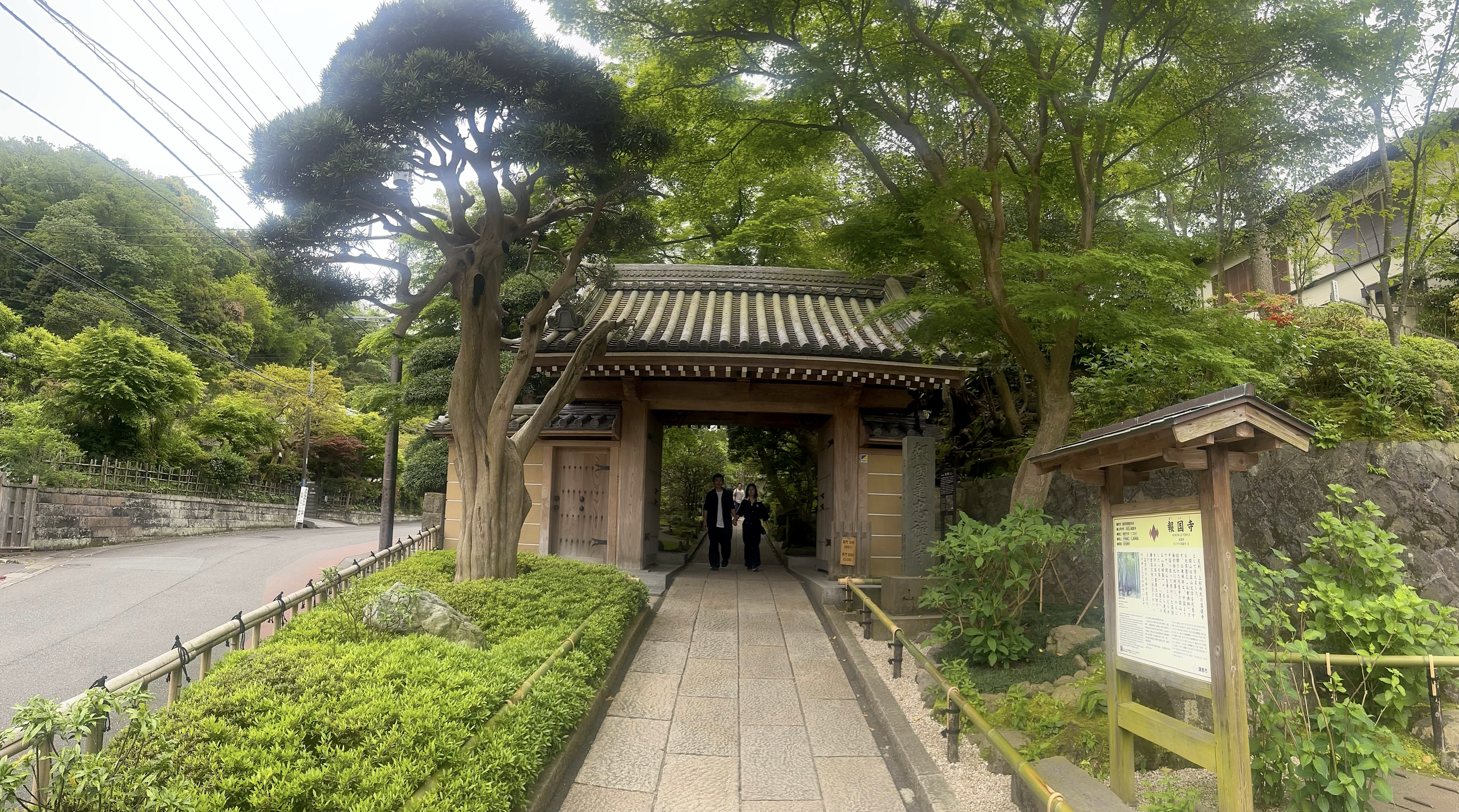
- The entrance of Hōkoku-ji

Religion
- Affiliation: Rinzai Zen

Location
- Location: 7–4, Jomyoji 2-chome, Kamakura, Kanagawa 248–0003
- Country: Japan
- Interactive map of Hōkoku-ji

Architecture
- Founder: Ashikaga Ietoki; Tengan Eko (founding priest)
- Completed: 1334

Hōkoku-ji (報国寺) is an old temple in the Kenchō-ji school of the Rinzai sect of Zen Buddhism located in Kamakura, Japan. Famous for its bamboo garden, it is also known as "Bamboo Temple".

A statue of Gautama Buddha, called Shaka Nyorai in Japanese, in a sacred hall is the temple's principal image. The original of a statue of Sho Kan'non is on display at the Kamakura Museum of National Treasures. The temple is sometimes called Takuma-dera after the artist of a statue of Kashyap which was destroyed by a fire in 1891 in an adjacent hall.

The temple is No. 10 on the Kamakura 33 Kannon pilgrimage. The grounds cover approximately 13,000 square metres (140,000 sq ft).

== History ==
The family temple of both the Ashikaga and Uesugi clans, Hōkoku-ji was established by founding priest Tengan Eko in 1334 (the first year of the Kenmu era) to commemorate Ashikaga Ietoki, grandfather of Ashikaga Takauji the first shōgun of the Ashikaga shogunate.

Known posthumously by his Buddhist name Butsujo Zenji, Eko was a member of the Five Mountains Zen literary school. Copies that he made of Buddhist teachings and carved wooden seals of his names "Tengan" and "Eko" are Important Cultural Properties and are in the Kamakura Museum on the grounds of the Shinto shrine Tsurugaoka Hachiman-gū. Other treasures owned by the temple include a painting on silk of Zaichū Kōen dating to 1388, a Muromachi-period painting of Arhats, and a pair of paintings of flowers and birds from Ming China, all Prefectural Cultural Properties kept in the same museum; a number of further works have been designated for protection at a municipal level.

Ashes of the Ashikaga family including Ietoki and Yoshihisa who both died by seppuku (Yoshihisa was only age 13), are reportedly buried in the large caves at the temple's west side.

The 1923 Great Kantō earthquake destroyed most of the temple structures including the original straw roof on the main hall. A similar roof is maintained on the bell tower today. Most of the temple structures were rebuilt.

Near the bell tower, five-tier memorial towers called gorintō commemorate the thousands of warriors who were killed in the 1333 battle in Kamakura that marked the end of rule by the Hōjō clan.

== Bamboo grove ==
A former annex behind the main hall was a training area where Butsujo Zenji also wrote poetry. Today a grove or forest of about 2000 mōsō bamboo sits in place of the annex. The site has a small tea house or chashitsu that is popular with tourists.

== Gallery ==
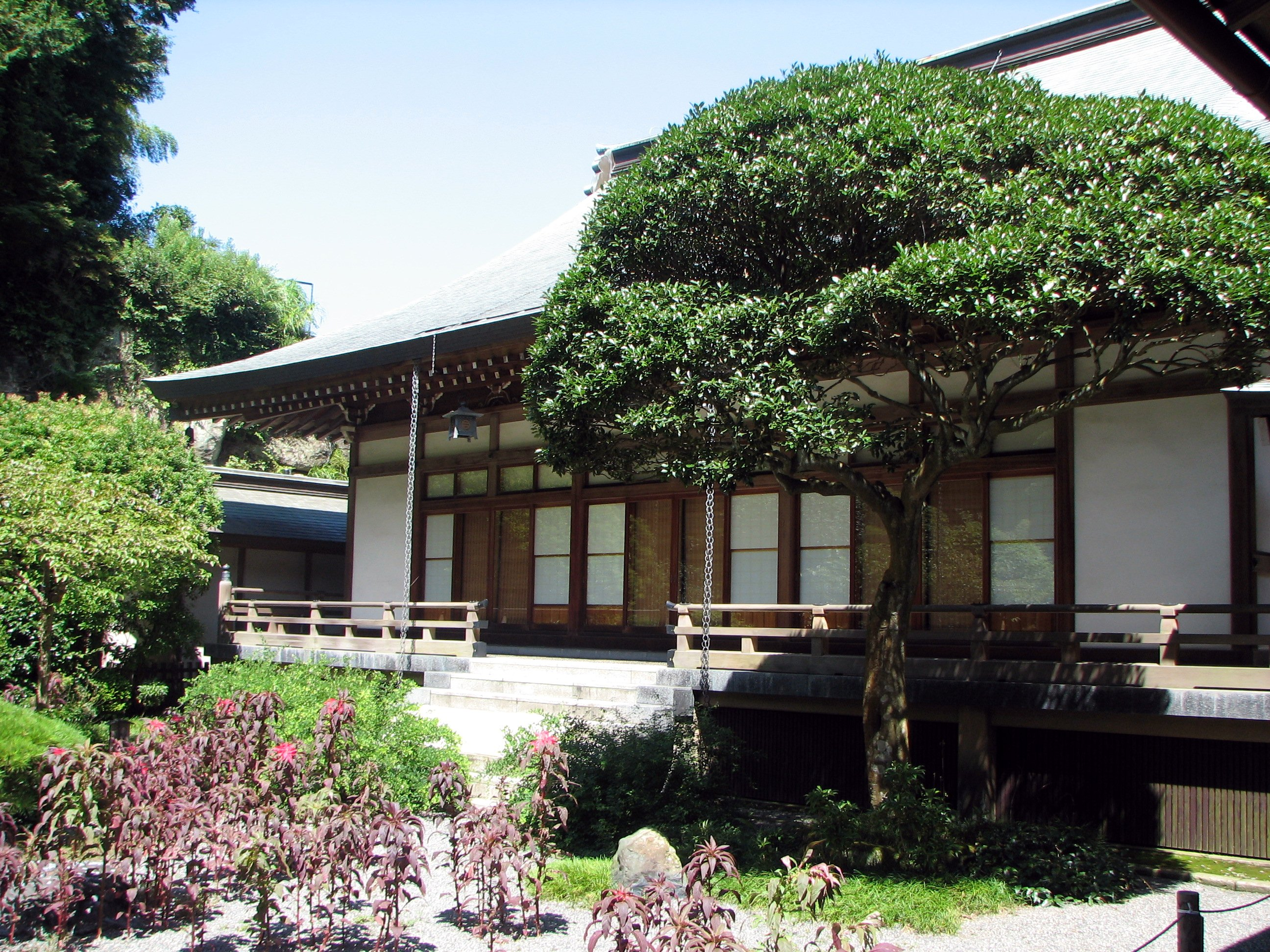
Temple structures

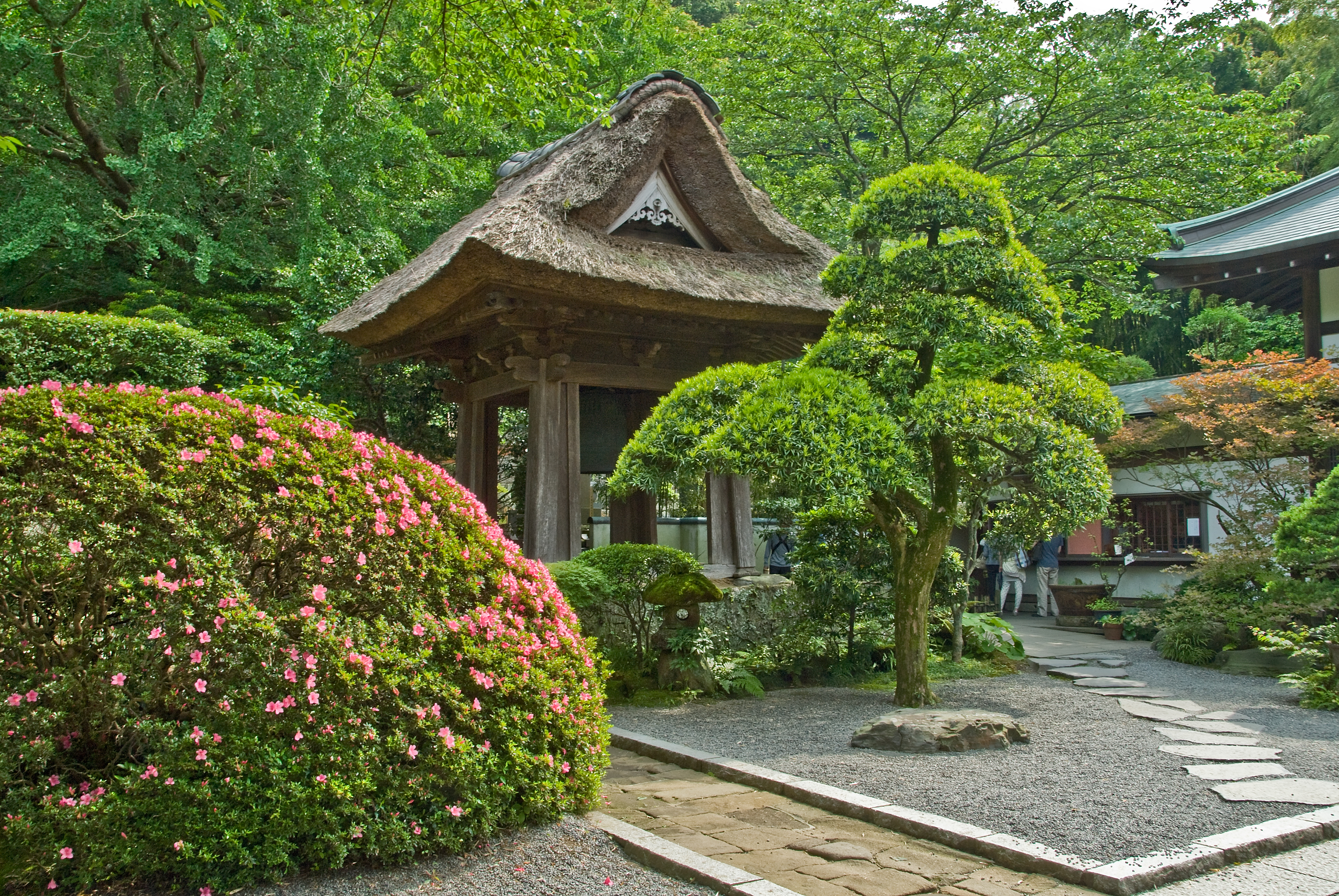
The bell tower with its straw roof

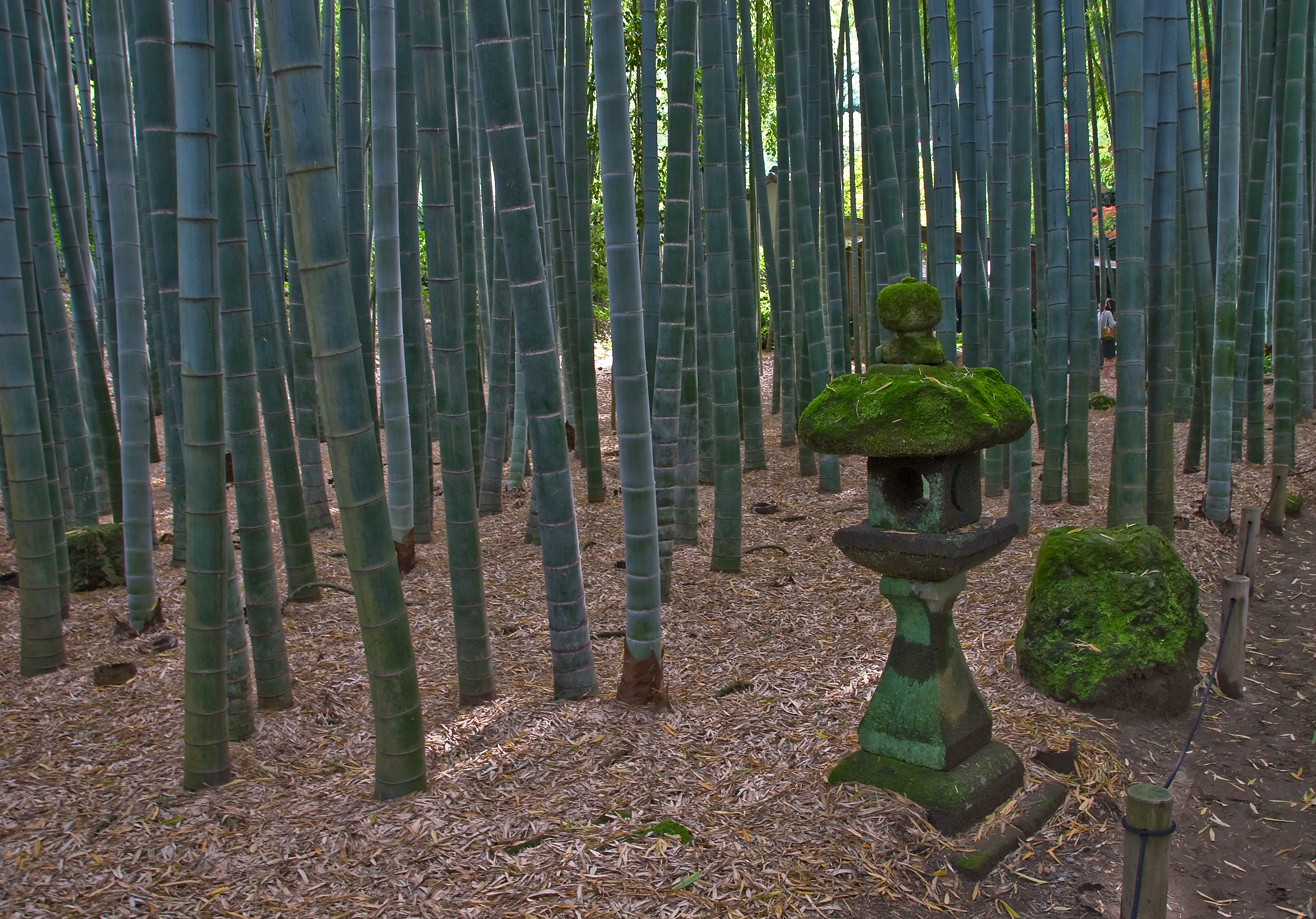
Stone lantern in the bamboo forest

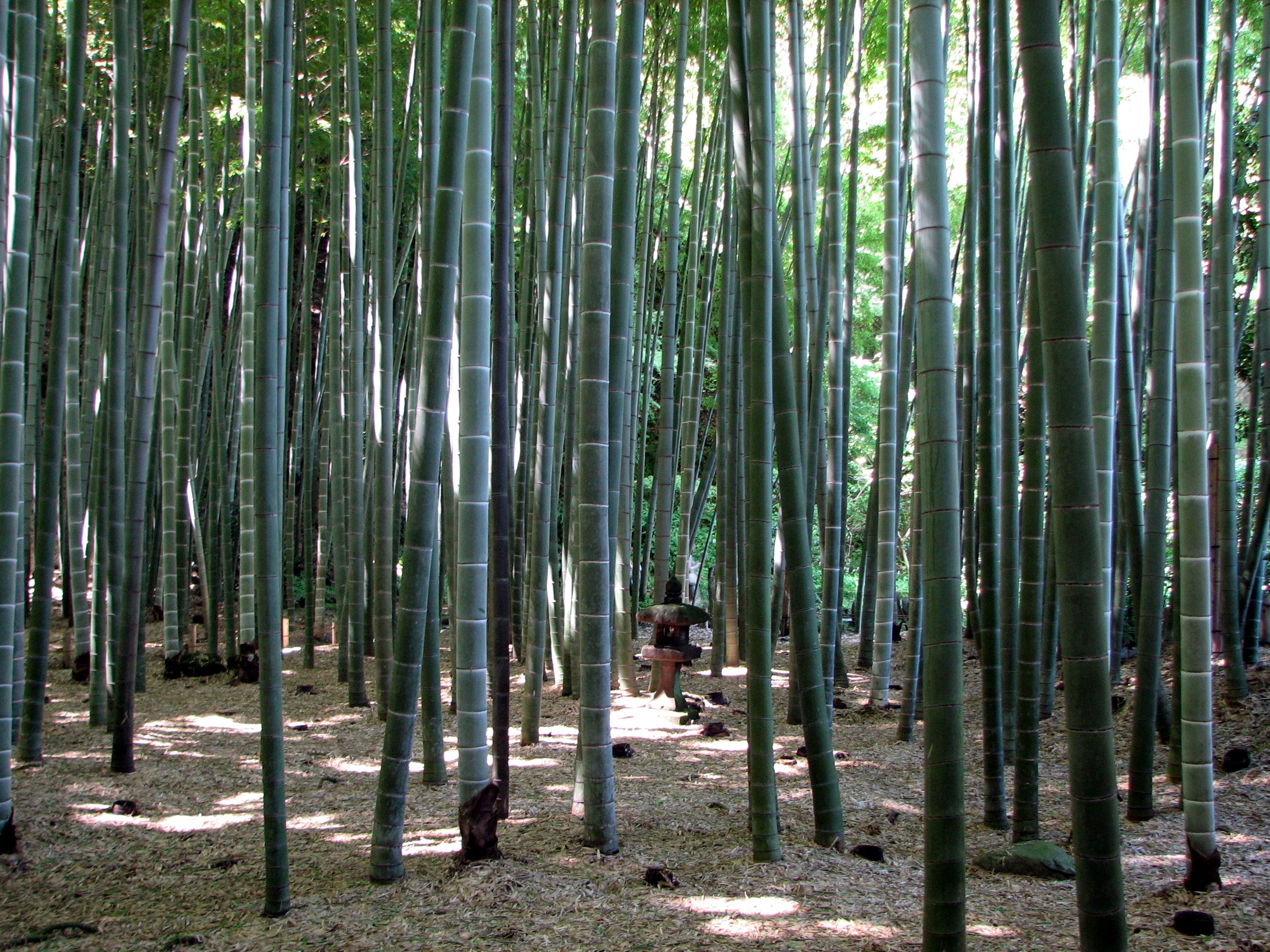
Grove of mōsō bamboo

(video) Inside the bamboo forest

== See also ==
- Thirteen Buddhist Sites of Kamakura
- Yagura (tombs)
- Kamakura's proposed World Heritage sites
