= Tsūsai Sugawara =

Japanese activist and actor (1894–1981)

- Tsūsai Sugawara in Floating Weeds (1959)
- Born: 菅原通濟; Sugawara Michinari; 16 February 1894; Kashiwa, Japan
- Died: 13 June 1981 (aged 87)
- Occupations: Civic Leader, Businessman, Writer, Art Patron, Actor

Tsūsai Sugawara (or Sugahara, 菅原通済 or 菅原通濟, 16 February 1894 – 13 June 1981) was a Japanese social activist, business leader, writer, art patron, and occasional actor. In the West he is best known for his cameo appearances in several of the last films directed by Yasujirō Ozu.

In 1976, Sugawara was among the nominees for the Nobel Peace Prize.

== Business career ==
The son of a Kamakura railroad magnate, Sugawara became a real estate developer and industrialist, notably effecting the subdivision, improvement, and accessibility of Kamakurayama (the city's mountain district) as a high-end residential area in the 1930s. He bridged Ōfuna to the island of Enoshima with Japan's first toll road, and he developed and managed the region's Enoshima Electric Railway, which connects Kamakura with Fujisawa.

He served as president of Japan's Construction Industry Association and was instrumental in the restoration that followed the Great Kantō Earthquake of 1923. A stone tablet near the Tsurugaoka Hachimangū in Kamakura honors Sugawara for his contribution to the city's prosperity.

== Civic activity ==
Sugawara's driving ambition, his passion for Japanese public policy, and his status as a "noted man of independent means" led to his lifelong reputation as an influential “fixer.” The American Political Science Review asserted in 1948 that Sugawara headed Japan's powerful "contractor syndicate" and provided "generous" financial support to multiple rival political parties because he "want[ed] railway contracts."

Among the politicians whose careers he cultivated was Shintaro Ishihara, a "disciple" of his who eventually became governor of Tokyo. As a backer of Prime Minister Hitoshi Ashida, Sugawara became embroiled in the Showa Denko corruption scandal that drove Ashida from office in 1948.

== Social reform agenda ==
An active social reformer, Sugawara led a public crusade in postwar Japan against the "three vices" of prostitution, venereal disease, and narcotics abuse. His high-profile activities as founder and president of "The Society for the Banishment of the Three Evils" even included appearing in several crime films inspired by his campaign, three of which starred Sonny Chiba.

In addition to organizing his own efforts, Sugawara's top-level relationships enabled him to influence Japan's social policy through direct appointments by Prime Ministers to various councils and committees. In 1956 Prime Minister Ichirō Hatoyama established a Council on Prostitution Policy which was chaired by Sugawara, and the resulting Prostitution Prevention Law criminalized solicitation, procurement, and contracts for prostitution, though not the act of prostitution itself. Sugawara admitted that the compromise legislation contained loopholes but at least made it illegal to sell daughters into prostitution, and he suggested that if prostitution could not be eradicated, official regulation may become an option: "If [the law] is found to be completely unworkable, then all we have to do is scrap it. People might even think then that licensed prostitution is the only answer."

In 1959, UPI reported a story about the plight of modern-day geisha that was culled from an article Sugawara had written for the magazine Bungei Shunju. Identified as a "financier, essayist, art connoisseur, and chairman of the council for the prevention of prostitution," Sugawara decried that an estimated 27 percent of geisha were engaging in prostitution, a result of rising expenses associated with the lifestyle. (Citing the diminishing number and advancing average age of geisha in Japan, he also asserted that girls now "prefer[red] to become dancers, models, and cabaret and bar hostesses rather than start training in music and dancing at the age of seven or eight," the traditional route required to become a full geisha by 18 or 19 years old.)

In the 1960s Sugawara chaired the Japanese National Committee for the Struggle Against Addiction to Drugs, estimating in 1965 that one-third of China's opium output was smuggled into Japan every year, pulling from its annual economy the 2021 equivalent of US$1.5 billion. Working with Shiro Nabarro, a member of Japan's House of Representatives and Chairman of both the Labor Committee and the Cabinet Commission on Narcotics Problems, Sugawara implemented a four-part plan he devised to end the nation's "serious threat" of heroin abuse in the early 1970s:

1. To destroy the smuggling routes.
2. To make the penalties for dealing more severe, including life imprisonment.
3. To appeal to the general public for cooperation by enlightening them into the realization of the misery of narcotic addiction.
4. To commit narcotic addicts to treatment centers and cure them at government expense.

The plan is credited with nearly eliminating the problem "in a very short time," and as chairman of the Committee on Drug Abuse Control, which operated out of the Prime Minister's office, Sugawara served as a consultant to the U.S. government's National Commission on Marihuana and Drug Abuse shortly thereafter.

Sugawara was nominated for the 1976 Nobel Peace Prize by Masayuki Fujio, the longtime member of Japan's House of Representatives who later became the country's controversial Minister of Education. No prize was awarded that year; two of the 1976 nominees shared the 1977 award.

== Cultural legacy ==
Detail of Sugawara's own version of one of the two Japanese National Treasures that he owned which are now held by the Tokiwayama Bunko Foundation. Sugawara's interpretation, also rendered as a hanging scroll, truncates the text and includes a self-portrait. The original, created in 1339 by Seisetsu Shōchō (Ch'ing-cho Cheng-ch'eng 清拙正澄), is a death verse that chronicles a large wave soaking the stars and deities as a rod-wielding temple guardian futilely tries to stop the end of the world by chasing after the lightning.

Sugawara was an avid art collector, particularly of Japanese and Chinese antiquities, founding the Tokiwayama Bunko (Library) Foundation to hold and catalog his acquisitions, which the organization continues to display at special events and museum exhibitions. The foundation possesses one of the largest collections of bokuseki calligraphy, ceramics, and religious arts in Japan. Sugawara's son Hisao (Toshio) and grandson Ken (its current director) have served the organization in leadership roles.

Sugawara's numerous books and essays further attest to his devotion to Japanese cultural preservation, and he created many of his own traditional works of calligraphy and brush art.

In 1966, Prime Minister Eisaku Satō appointed Sugawara as chairman of the Council for National Foundation Day, which recommended the establishment of an official government holiday every 11 February to commemorate the founding of Japan. Through the holiday, which ultimately was adopted, the council also sought to reassert a sense of national pride in response to public disfavor toward patriotic expression following World War II, and this subtext for their efforts has subjected the holiday to controversy over the years.

A friend of Yasujirō Ozu, Sugawara appeared in seven of the director's last eight films. For example, in Good Morning, the Ozu film in which a viewer is most likely to infer that Sugawara is playing himself, he is asked at a bar to comment on journalist Sōichi Ōya's 1957 warning that television was part of a mass media campaign to turn Japan into "a nation of 100 million idiots." Sugawara leans back and says, "Yes. TV sets are a nuisance." In Tokyo Twilight, the only one to feature his character in multiple scenes, he muses over a newspaper article announcing the end of legal prostitution in Japan.

Sugawara received a "special appearance" credit in Kurahara’s I Hate But Love (1962), briefly playing himself on a TV panel with star Yūjirō Ishihara, brother of his protege Shintaro Ishihara.
