= Kōmyō-ji (Kamakura) =

Buddhist temple in Kanagawa, Japan

Coordinates: 35°18′11.62″N 139°33′16.75″E

Tenshōzan Renge-in Kōmyō-ji
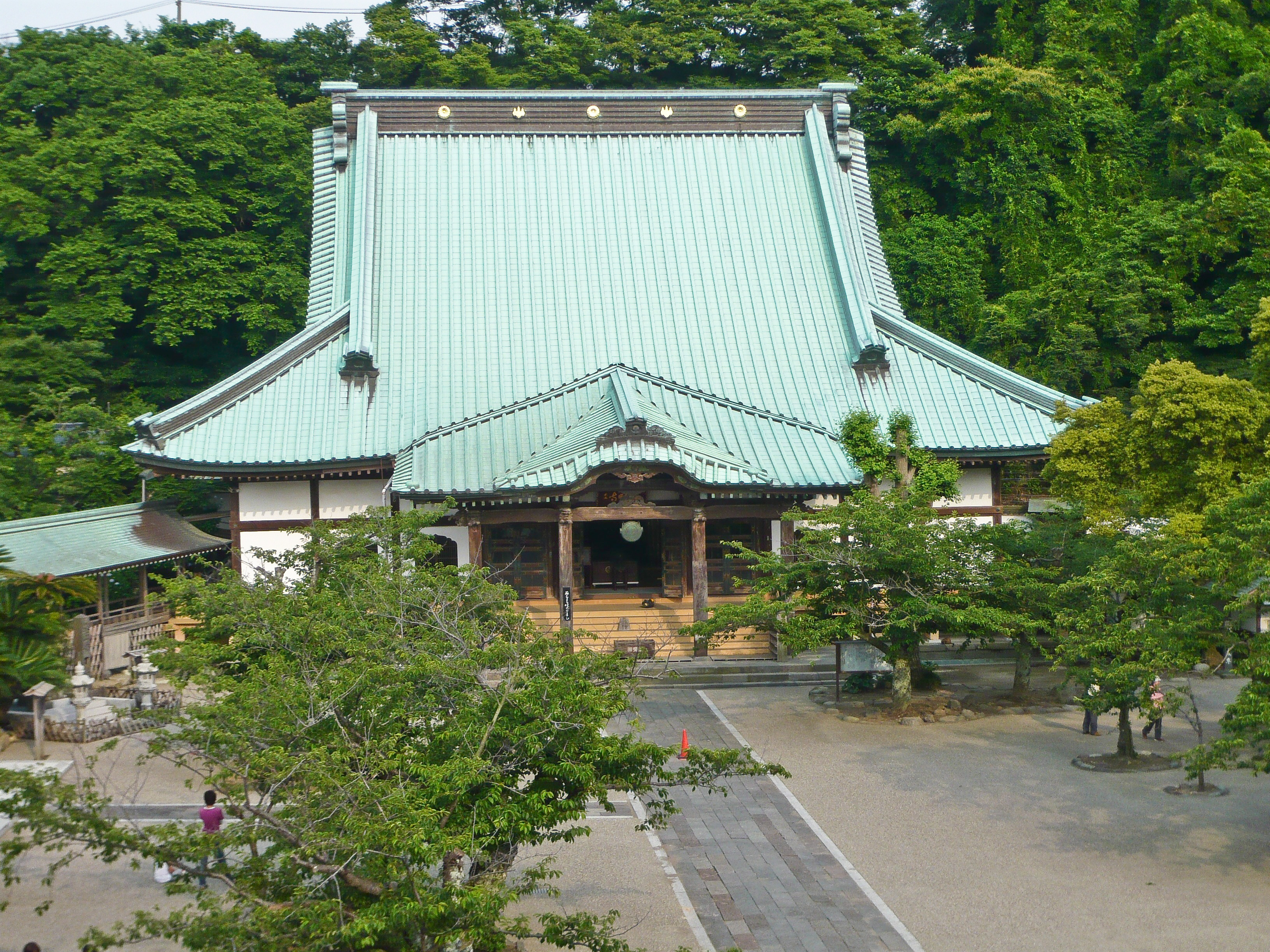
- The Hon-dō (Main Hall)

Religion
- Affiliation: Jōdo

Location
- Location: 1-19, 6-chome, Zaimokuza, Kamakura, Kanagawa 248-0013
- Country: Japan
- Interactive map of Tenshōzan Renge-in Kōmyō-ji

Architecture
- Founder: Hōjō Tsunetoki and Nenna Ryōchū (founding priest)
- Completed: 1924 (Reconstruction)

Website
- https://komyoji-kamakura.or.jp/

Tenshōzan Renge-in Kōmyō-ji (天照山蓮華院光明寺) is a Buddhist temple of the Jōdo sect in Zaimokuza, near Kamakura, Japan, the only major one in the city to be close to the sea. Kōmyō-ji is number one among the Kantō Jūhachi Danrin (関東十八檀林), a group of 18 Jōdo temples established during the Edo period by Tokugawa Ieyasu, and dedicated to both the training of priests and scholarly research. It is also the sect's head temple for the Kantō region. In spite of the fact it is a Jōdo sect temple, Kōmyō-ji has several of the typical features of a Zen temple, for example a sanmon (main gate), a pond and a karesansui (rock garden).

Kōmyō-ji has always enjoyed the patronage of Japan's powerful and is the only Buddhist temple in Kamakura to have had the privilege of being a daimyō's funeral temple. It was chosen for that role by the Naitō clan, feudal lords from today's Miyazaki Prefecture whose tombs are part of the temple's compound.

The temple, besides the usual Buddhist cemetery, maintains a special crypt for the ashes of house pets and other animals, and twice a year holds in the Main Hall ceremonies in their memory. The crypt was created and is maintained by a group of veterinarian volunteers.

The temple holds occasional music concerts in its main hall, concerts that are announced in its web site. For 3500 yen, visitors who make a reservation can try at Kōmyō-ji the vegetarian food the resident priests themselves eat. Entrance is free, with the exception of the sanmon, which can be visited only telephoning the temple, explaining the motives for the planned visit, making a reservation and paying a small fee.

== History ==
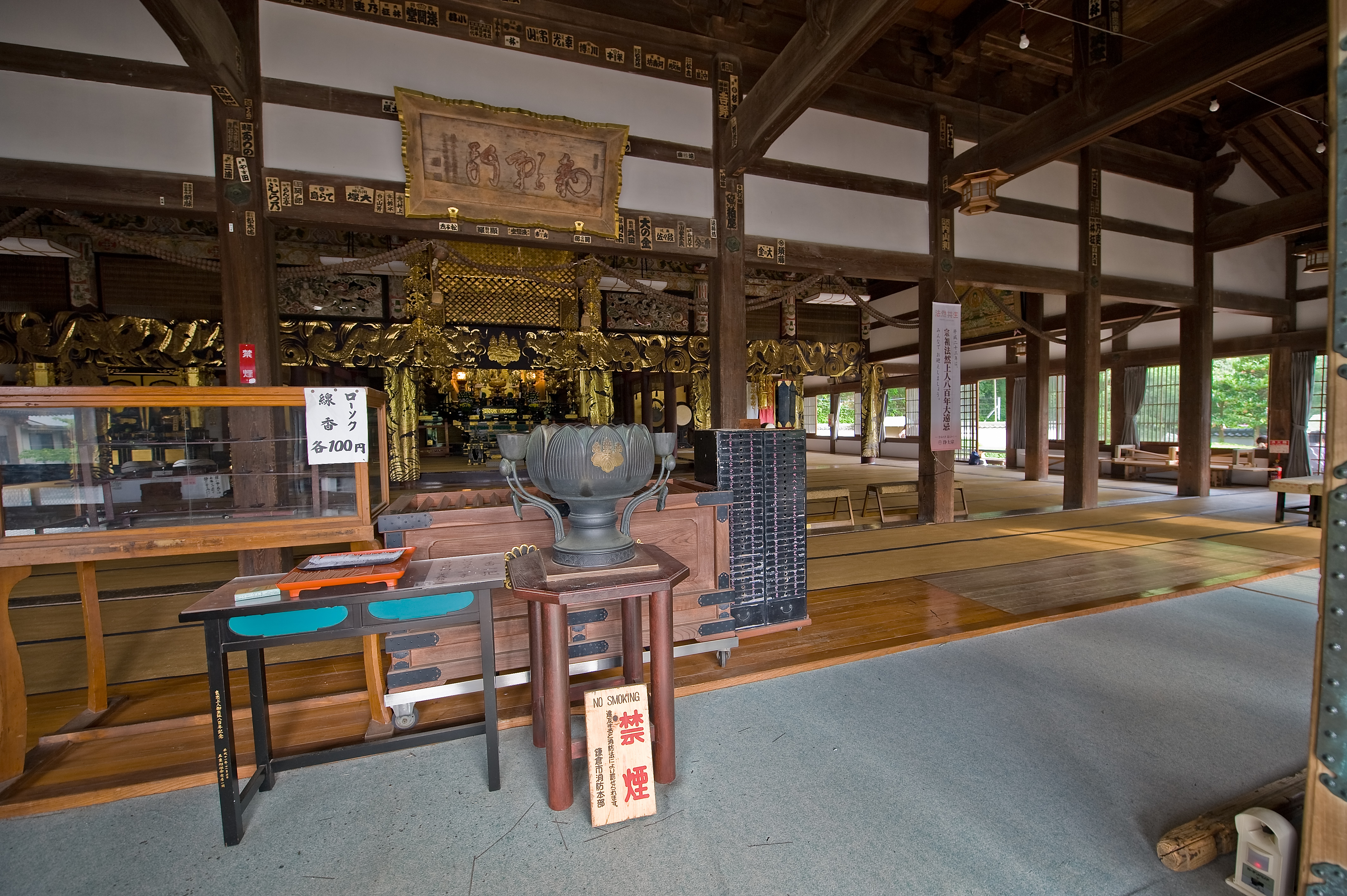
Kōmyō-ji's Main Hall

Kōmyō-ji's precise origins are unclear. According to the temple itself, it was founded by Kamakura's fourth regent and de facto ruler of Japan Hōjō Tsunetoki. According to this version of events, it was originally built in 1240 in the Sasukegayatsu Valley near Jufuku-ji for famous Buddhist priest Nenna :ja:Ryōchū (also known by his posthumous name Kishu Zenji). It was then called Renge-ji, or "Temple of Lotuses", a name which is still part of its official full name. Tradition says Tsunetoki received in a dream the divine order to rename the temple Kōmyō-ji, or "Temple of the Shining Light", and soon thereafter decided to move it to its present location near the sea. The usual date given by the temple itself for the transfer and the name change is 1243, however it isn't clearly supported by any historical record. It would be therefore more precise to say that the date of foundation is unclear.

According to a variant of the theory, Renge-ji was originally opened for Ryōchū by Hōjō Tomonao (a.k.a. :ja:Osaragi Tomonao) with the name Goshin-ji (悟真寺).

Kōmyō-ji was later sponsored by Hōjō Tokiyori and other Kamakura regents, acquiring a complete seven-building temple compound (七堂伽藍, shichidō garan) and becoming a center of Amidist devotion in the Kantō region. Ryōchū presided over the temple for more than forty years, dying there in 1287.

During the following years, the temple enjoyed the continuous religious and financial support of emperors, shōguns and daimyōs, among them Ashikaga Takauji and several other Muromachi period shōguns, taikō Toyotomi Hideyoshi, and Tokugawa Ieyasu, and their generosity is well attested by the temple's archives. Three different emperors, Go-Hanazono, Go-Tsuchimikado and Go-Uda, donated it their own calligraphy.

During the Muromachi period it was restored by Yūshō Shōnin and in 1495 Emperor Go-Tsuchimikado made it his praying temple. When Tokugawa Ieyasu in 1547 created the Kantō Jūhachi Danrin (関東十八檀林) group of temples, he dedicated it to the training of priests and scholarship, and put Kōmyō-ji at its top.

The buildings presently part of its compound belong to different eras, the sōmon (first gate) being the oldest (it was built in the first half of the 17th century) and the Kaisandō (Founder's Hall) the newest (having been built in 1924).

== Features ==
The temple's gates are a few hundred meters from the ruins of Wakaejima, an artificial island built in 1232 which, in spite of its state of disrepair, has been declared a national Historic Site because it's the sole surviving example of artificial harbor of the Kamakura period. Wakaejima used to be the point of entry of most of the cargo needed to support the city and it's likely that at least part of Kōmyō-ji's own timber came from there.

The Zen style main gate (the sōmon (総門) was first erected in 1495, then restored in 1624–1628, and it is believed that part of the old timber was reused for the reconstruction.

The huge Hon-dō (Main Hall) is an Important Cultural Property. To its left lie the Kaisandō and the Shoin drawing room. Between them is the temple's lotus pond, designed in the early 17th century.

=== Sanmon ===
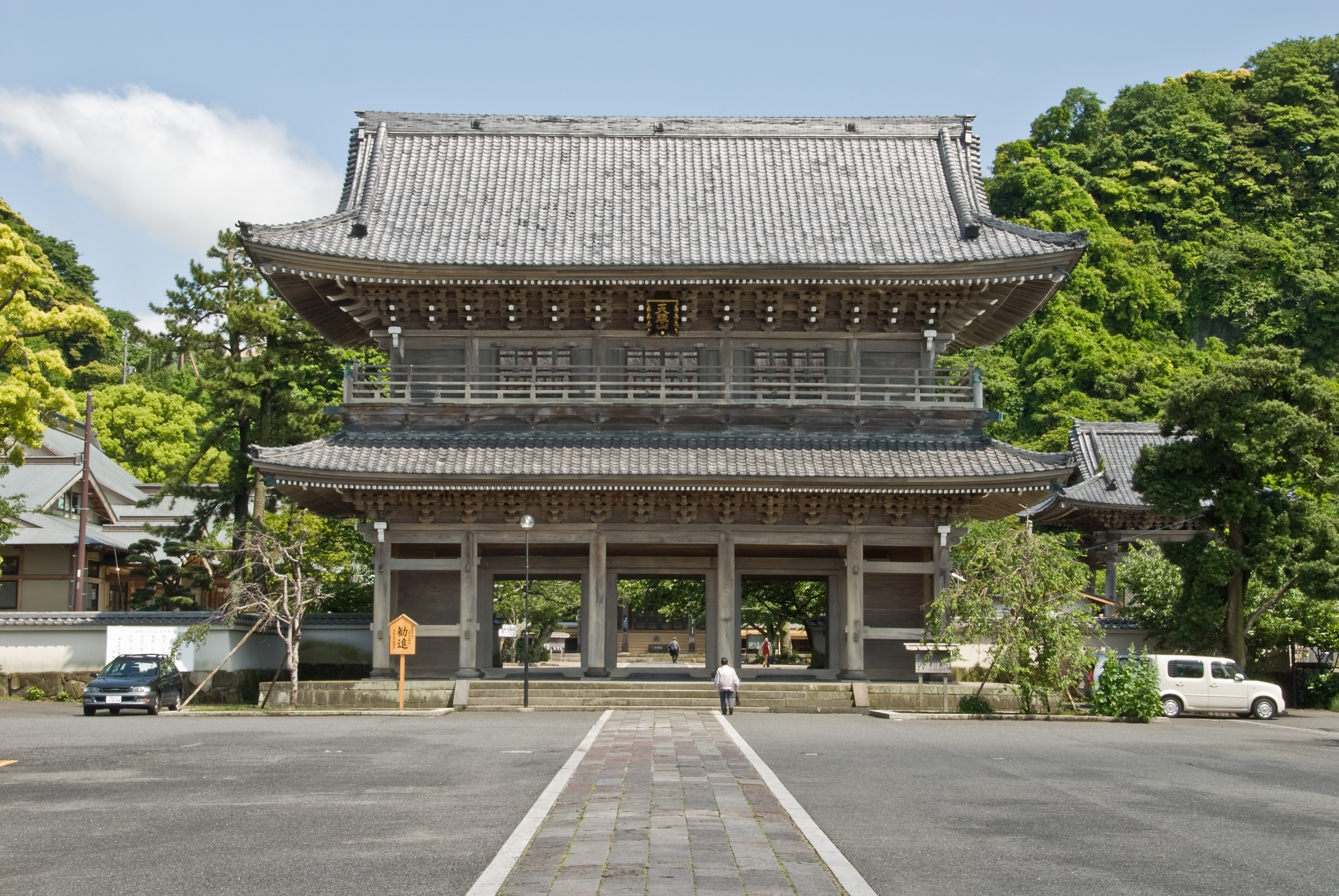
Kōmyō-ji's huge sanmon, the biggest in the Kantō region

The temple's huge sanmon (the second gate) is an 1847 reconstruction of an older original. The 16 meter wide structure has two stories, the first in traditional Japanese style, the second in Zen (Chinese) style. The characters Tenshōzan (天照山; Mountain of Divine Enlightenment) on the gable under the Sanmon were written by Emperor Go-Hanazono himself in 1436 and sent to the temple as a present.

The Sanmon's second floor contains several statues, the most important of which are the so-called Shaka Sanzon (釈迦三尊), or Shakyamuni Trinity, three statues which represent Shaka, Monju Bosatsu and Fugen Bosatsu. (The statue of Fugen Bosatsu has however been lost). The so-called Shi Tennō, or Four Heavenly Kings (Deva Kings) are statues of four protector gods. These are accompanied by the Sixteen Arhats (十六羅漢). All the statues were built during the late Edo period.

The Sanmon is usually closed to the public, but it's occasionally opened for ceremonies or festivities, and can be visited at any time telephoning the temple, explaining the motives for the visit and paying a small fee.

=== Rock garden ===
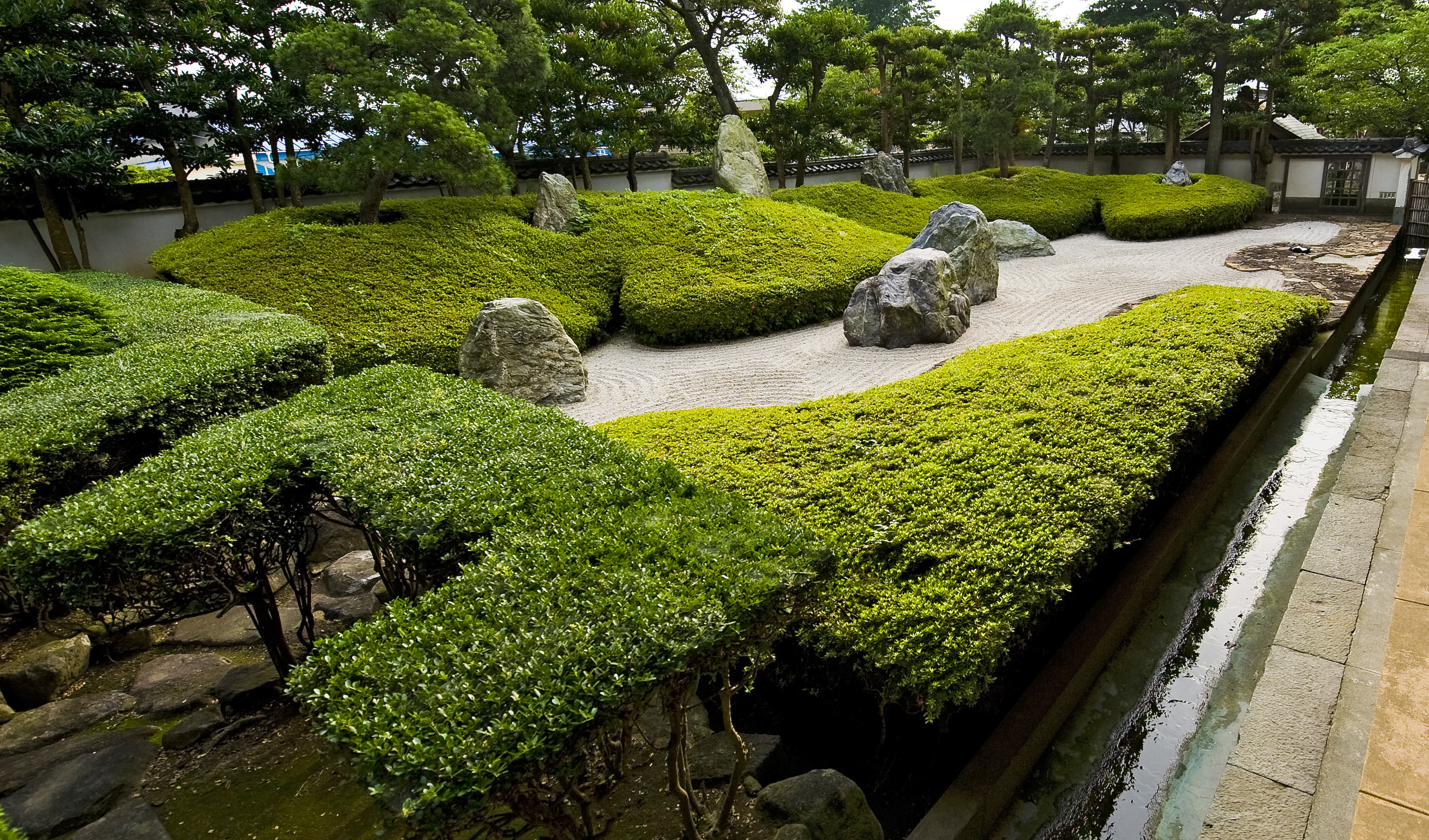
Kōmyō-ji's rock garden with its eight rocks

Located next to the main hall, the rock garden consists of white raked gravel, some rhododendrons and eight rocks. Each rock represents a saint or a god. The group of three to the left, surrounded by plants, represent the Amida trinity, with Amida Amida Nyorai at the center, Seishi to the left and goddess Kannon to the right.

The remaining five stones represent Shakyamuni and four priests who contributed to the diffusion of Buddhism: Zendō, Hōnen, Benchō, and the temple's own Ryōchū. Rock gardens are often called Zen gardens because they normally are a feature of Zen temples of the Rinzai sect like Kamakura's own Kenchō-ji, Engaku-ji and Zuisen-ji, which all have one. It is therefore rare to find one in a Jōdo temple. The rock garden is a popular gathering spot among the numerous stray cats that live on the premises.

=== Pet cemetery ===
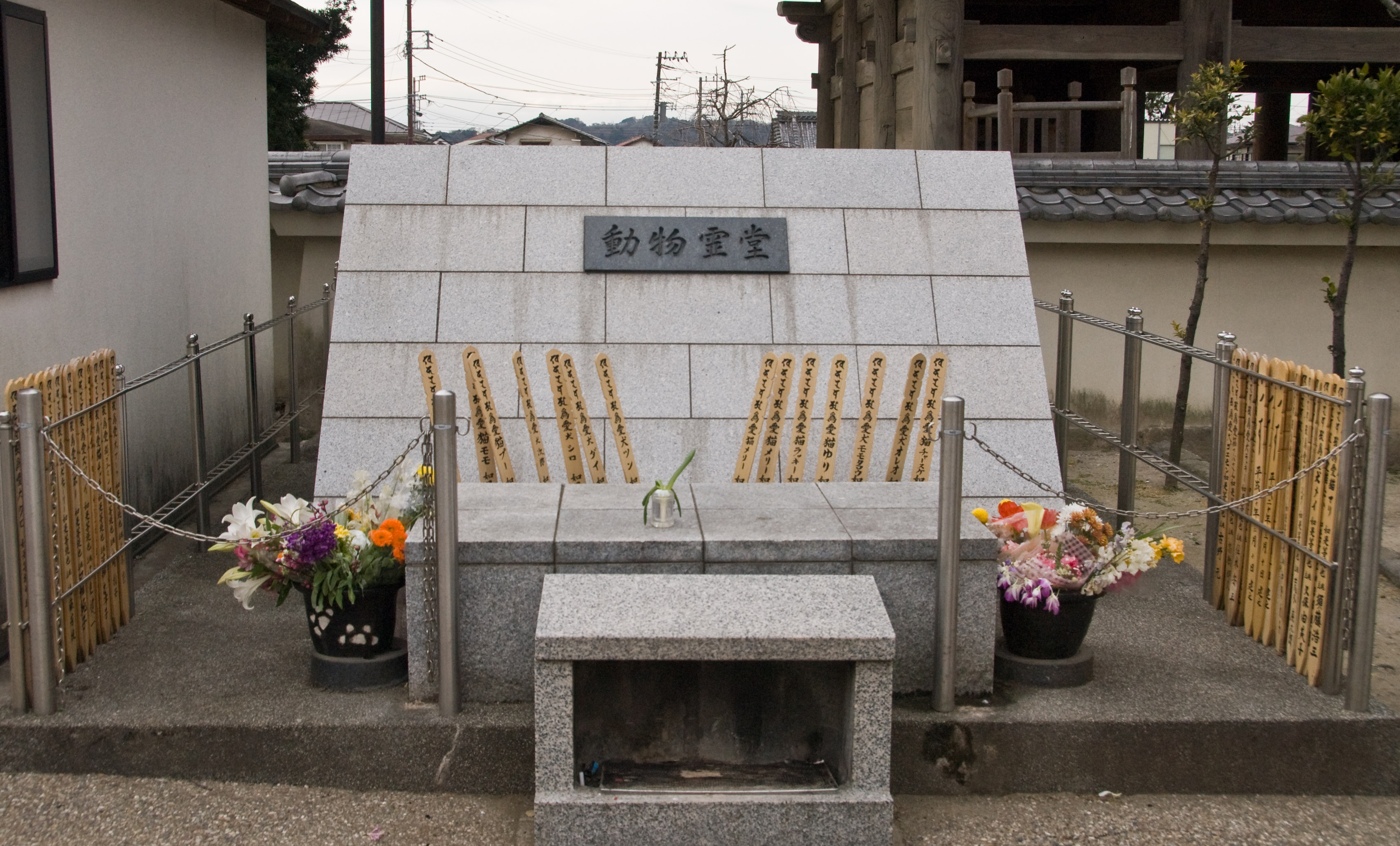
The pet cemetery. The names on the sotōba (wooden stupas) are those of pets: Jiro, Top, Goemon and Nonnon.

Immediately after the sanmon, next to the cemetery lies the Animal Crypt (動物霊堂, Dōbutsu Reidō), an animal mortuary maintained by the Shōnan Jūishikai Dōbutsu Reidō Hōsankai, a group of volunteers affiliated with a local association of veterinarians, the Shōnan Jūishikai.

The veterinarians of the association had originally created the crypt at Kōmyō-ji to inter the ashes of cats, dogs, birds and other animals who had died in their care but, after many other pet owners expressed the wish to bury their animals there too, the association decided to grant the wish to all who apply after the payment of a small fee. The ashes are laid to rest on the 10th day of every month after the chanting of sūtras, and are often accompanied by a sotōba (a wooden stupa), carrying the pet's name.

Twice a year, in spring and autumn, a memorial service is held in the temple's main hall for the souls of the dead animals.

=== Kōmyō-ji's Ten Nights of Prayer ===
Every year, from 12 to 25 October, Kōmyō-ji holds the Jūya Hōyō (十夜法要, Ten Night Memorial Service), a celebration which started in 1495 and consists of three days and three nights of uninterrupted sūtra chanting in the main hall.

The festival was born by order of Emperor Go-Tsuchimikado, who invited the temple's ninth abbot Yushu Shōnin to Kyoto, where he was given permission to hold a rite consisting of ten days and ten nights of continuous prayer. Nowadays the rites last only three days, but are performed in Jōdo temples all over the country.

Because the event attracts so many people, during those days the temple's compound is full of stands, selling mostly potted plants, but also food and drinks.
