= Kamakura Museum of National Treasures =

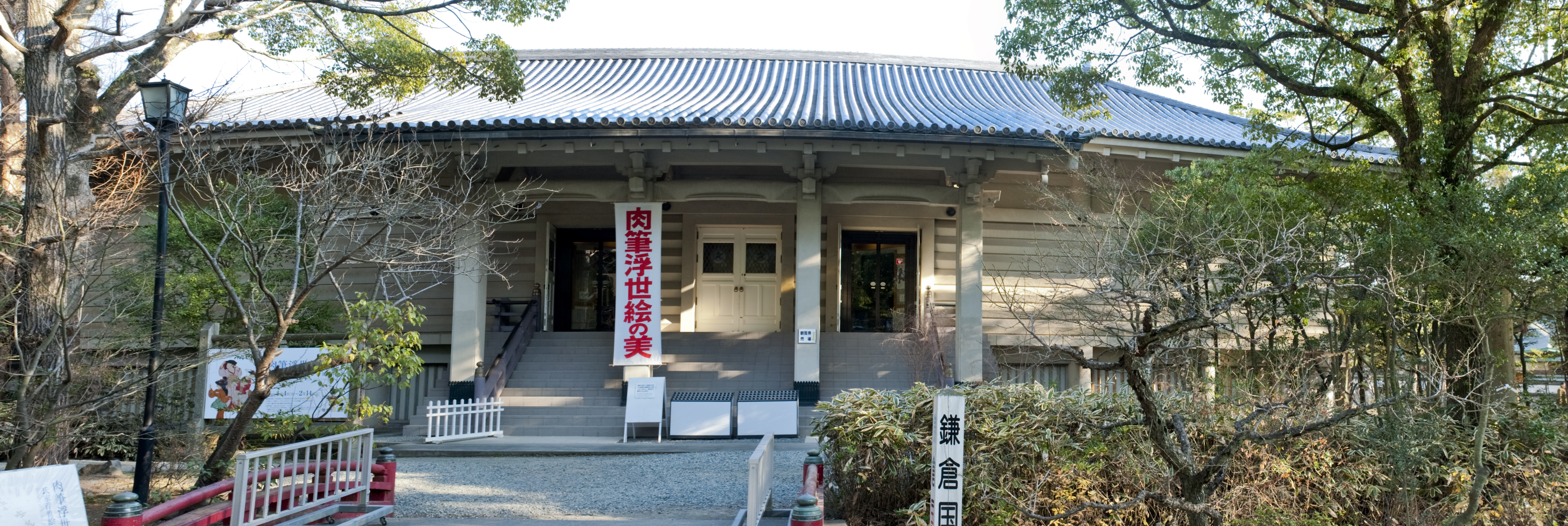

- Location within Japan
- Established: 1928
- Location: 2-1-1 Yukinoshita Kamakura Kanagawa 248-0005 Japan
- Coordinates: 35.324667°N 139.557036°E
- Type: Art museum
- Public transit access: Kamakura Station
- Website: kamakura.kanagawa.jp/kokuhoukan/

The Kamakura Museum of National Treasures (鎌倉国宝館, Kamakura Kokuhōkan) or Kamakura Museum or Kamakura National Treasure House is a museum located on the grounds of Tsurugaoka Hachiman-gū in Yukinoshita, Kamakura, Kanagawa Prefecture, Japan. The museum houses around 4800 objects from the Kamakura region including sculptures, paintings and industrial art objects. Most of these works originate from the Kamakura and Muromachi periods, spanning from the 12th to the 16th century. Some of the items were produced in China and imported to Japan.

== Name ==
The term "National Treasure" in the museum's name refers to "old" National Treasures of Japan, term which denoted all the state-designated Cultural Properties of Japan before the Law for the Protection of Cultural Properties came into force on August 29, 1950. All of the old national treasures became Important Cultural Properties and some of them have been designated as (new) National Treasures since June 9, 1951. From a current perspective the name refers to a museum housing both Important Cultural Properties and National Treasures.

== History ==
The Kamakura Museum of National Treasure was founded in April 1928 to protect important art works after the 1923 Great Kantō earthquake. The building, which was constructed in the same year, was modeled after the Shōsōin treasure house of Tōdai-ji, Nara. During World War II, in June 1945, part of the collection was evacuated to Kushikawa (串川村, Kushikawa-mura) in Tsukui District in the northwestern part of Kamakura, and the museum was temporarily closed between August and October 1945. The items which had been moved returned in May 1946.

In October 1952, the museum came under the jurisdiction of the newly established Kamakura City Board of Education. In November 1955 it joined the Kanagawa Museum Association (神奈川県博物館協会, Kanagawa-ken Hakubutsukan Kyōkai). The "Foundation Ujiie Ukiyo-e Collection" (財団法人氏家浮世絵コレクション) was established in the museum in October 1974. In 1983 the museum's annex storage room was completed, and in May 2000 the main building was designated as a Registered Tangible Cultural Property.

== Main Building ==
The main building is a two-story reinforced concrete construction with tile-roofing and a building area of about 800 m^{2}. There is no basement. The construction resembles the raised-floor-style of an ancient log storehouse. It was designed by Okada Shin'ichirō (岡田信一郎), architect of the Kabuki-za theater and the Otaru branch of the Bank of Japan, and constructed by the Matsui Group (松井組, now Matsui Construction Co.: 松井建設株式会社). From the outside the building resembles Nara's Shōsōin treasure house, while techniques from Kamakura period temples have been employed on the interior. The ground floor is used as storage, while the second floor contains a single exhibition hall spanning almost 600 m^{2}.

== Annex ==
The annex is connected to the main building via a walkway on the second floor. Like the main building it is a two-story reinforced concrete construction featuring two floors above ground and a basement, with rooms for repairs and machines. The ground floor contains offices and the room of the curator, while the second floor is used as storage space.

== Highlights of the Collection ==
The Kamakura Museum houses five National Treasures of Japan, 73 items designated as "Important Cultural Property", and other works of art. There are about 100 nikuhitsuga ukiyo-e paintings in the "Ujiie Ukiyo-e Collection".

=== National Treasures ===
- Portrait of Lanxi Daolong (Rankei Dōryū) (蘭溪道隆像, Rankei Dōryū-zō)

Hanging scroll, 104.8 cm x 46.4 cm, light color on silk. Kamakura period, 1271. Lent by Kenchō-ji.
A Chinese chan (zen) master, Lanxi, is depicted sitting on a chair. The scroll carries an inscription on the upper part written by Lanxi himself.

- Taima Mandala engi (当麻曼荼羅縁起, taima mandara engi)

Two handscrolls (Emakimono), 51.5 cm x 796.7 cm and 51.5 cm x 689.8 cm, color on paper. Kamakura period. Lent by Kōmyō-ji.

- A lacquered inkstone case decorated with laminae of mother of pearl depicting chrysanthemum flowers, flying birds and a bamboo hedge (籬菊螺鈿蒔絵硯箱, magakinikiku raden makie suzuri bako)

Lacquer box with maki-e decorations, 26.0 cm x 24.1 cm. Kamakura period. Lent by Tsurugaoka Hachiman-gū.
The case was a gift to Minamoto no Yoritomo from Emperor Go-Shirakawa.

- Old sacred treasures (古神宝類, koshinpōrui), 35 items from the Kamakura period lent by Tsurugaoka Hachiman-gū, including:
  - one red lacquer bow (朱漆弓)
  - 30 black lacquer arrows (黒漆矢, kokushitsuya) (one arrow shaft is missing)
  - one quiver with gold maki-e in ikakeji technique , inlaid with mother of pearl decorations of apricot leaves (沃懸地杏葉螺鈿平やなぐい, ikakeji gyōyō raden no hirayanagui)

Height: 32.7 cm.

- two long swords with gold maki-e in ikakeji technique, inlaid with mother of pearl decorations of apricot leaves (沃懸地杏葉螺鈿太刀, ikakeji gyōyō raden no tachi) (one with sword guard missing)

Length: 105.8 cm.

- one quiver with gold maki-e in ikakeji technique, inlaid with mother of pearl decorations of apricot leaves (沃懸地杏葉螺鈿平やなぐい, ikakeji gyōyō raden no hirayanagui)

- Calligraphy of Daikaku Zenji: Buddhist sermon and regulations (大覚禅師墨蹟 法語規則, daikaku zenji bokuseki hōgo kisoku)

Two scrolls, 85.2 cm x 41.4 cm (sermon) and 85.5 cm x 40.7 cm (regulations), ink on paper. Kamakura period, 13th century. Lent by Kenchō-ji.
The two scrolls were written by Lanxi Daolong (jap.: Rankei Dōryū, posthumous name: Daikaku Zenji).

== See also ==
- List of National Treasures of Japan (paintings)
- List of National Treasures of Japan (crafts-others)
