= Kanagawa Prefectural Museum of Cultural History =

Coordinates: 35°26′56.95″N 139°38′10.62″E

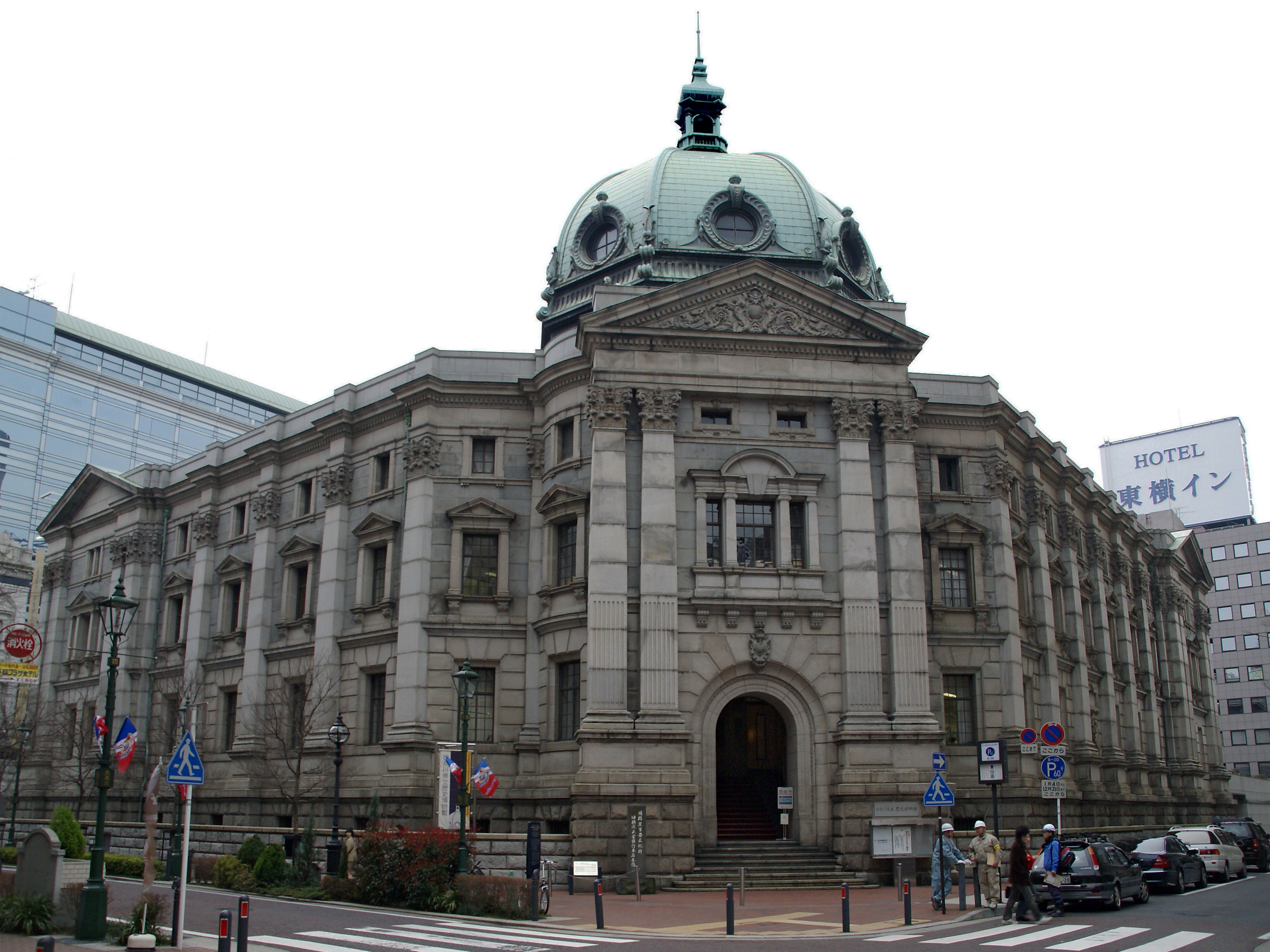
- The Yokohama Specie Bank (now The Kanagawa Prefectural Museum of Cultural History)
- Location: Naka-ku, Yokohama; Kanagawa, Japan

Kanagawa Prefectural Museum of Cultural History (神奈川県立歴史博物館, Kanagawa Kenritsu Rekishi Hakubutsukan) also known as the Yokohama Museum of Cultural History is a history museum in Naka-ku, Yokohama, Kanagawa, Japan.

Its exhibition focuses on the culture and history of Kanagawa Prefecture.

It is located in the building of the former Yokohama Specie Bank.

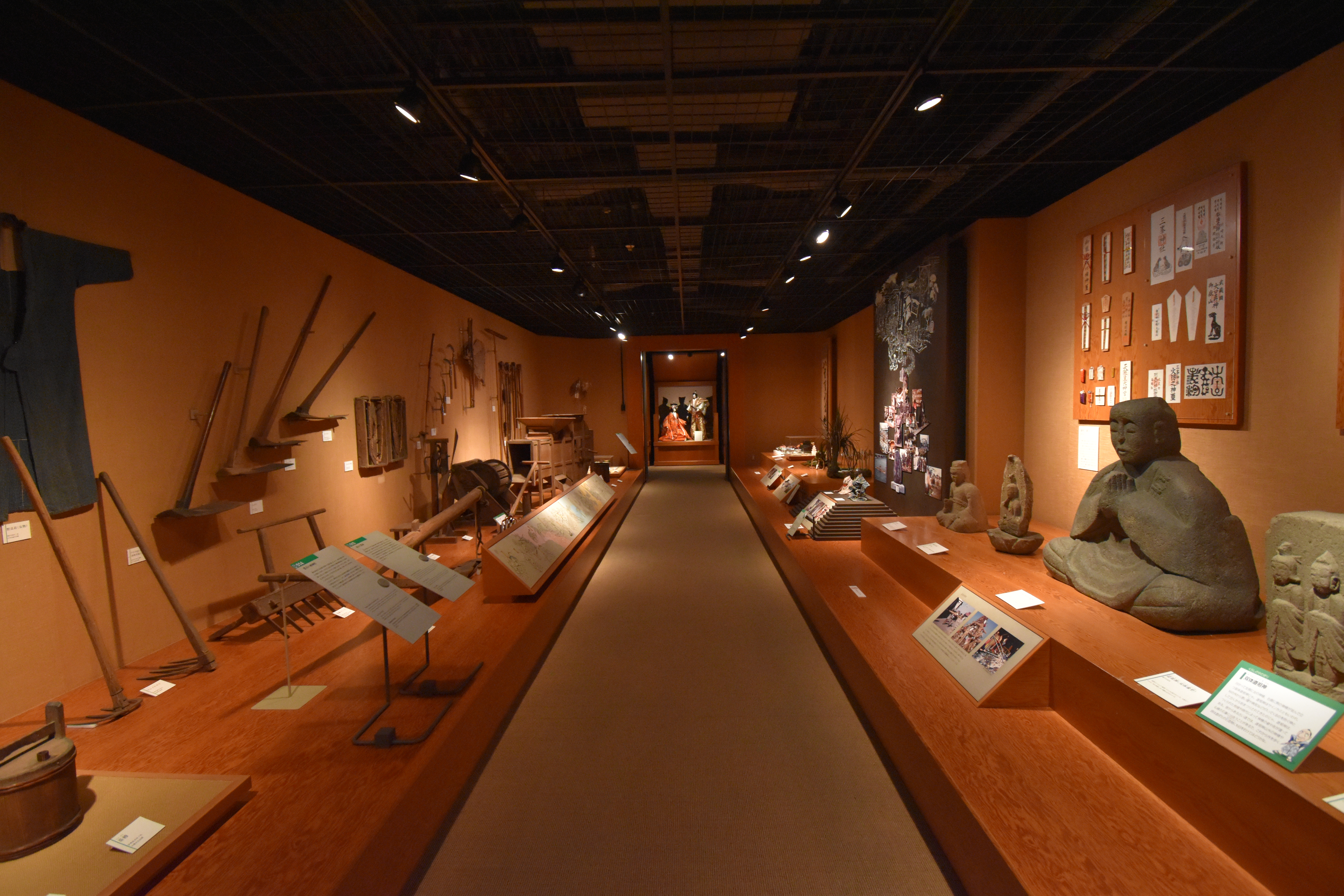
The folkloristics gallery, Floor 2

== See also ==
- Yokohama Archives of History
- Yokohama History Museum
