= Sōmon =

Japanese architectural element

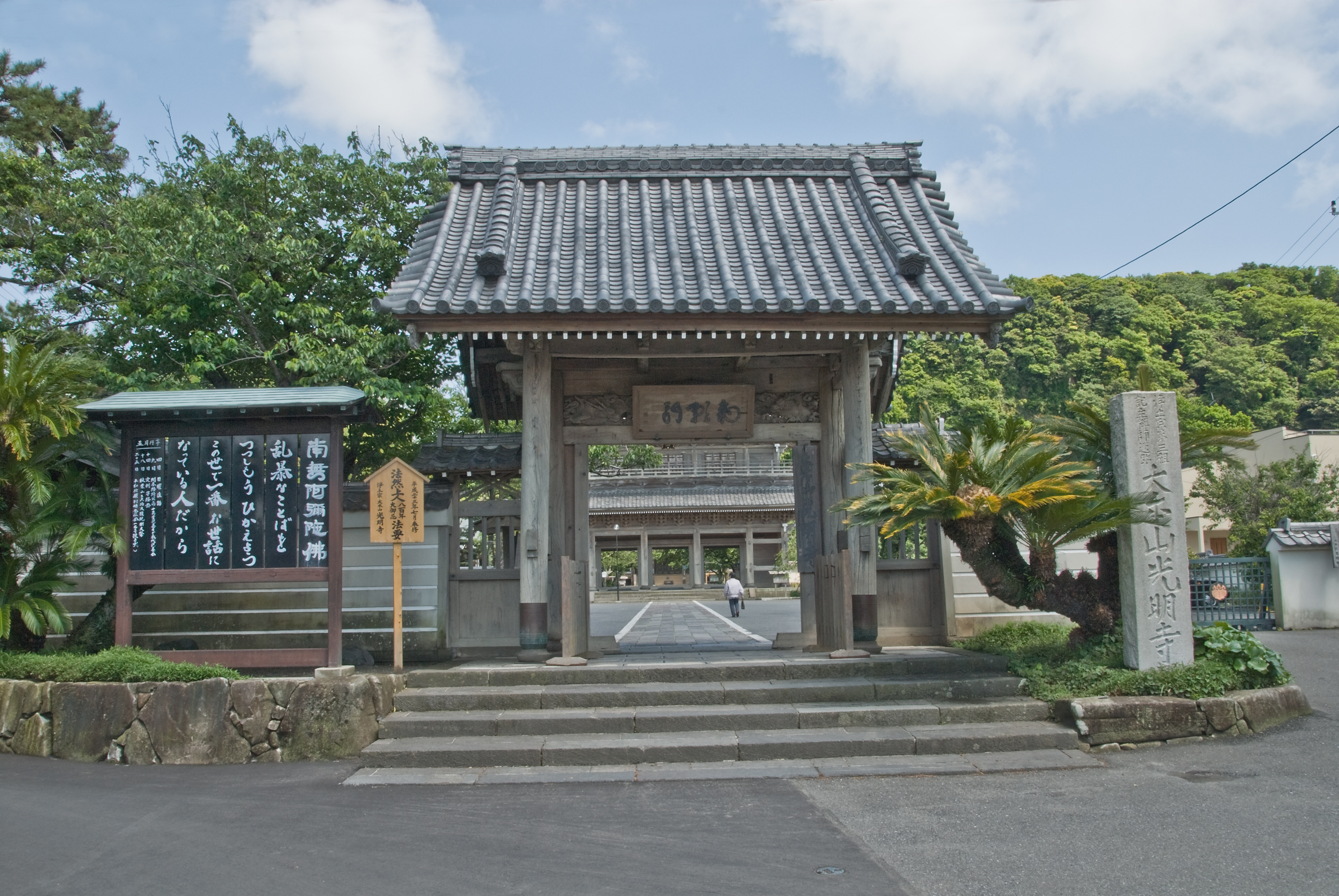
Sōmon

Sōmon (総門; lit. 'general gate') is the gate at the entrance of a Buddhist temple in Japan. It often precedes the bigger and more important sanmon.
