= Lanxi Daolong =

Chinese monk, calligrapher, philosopher

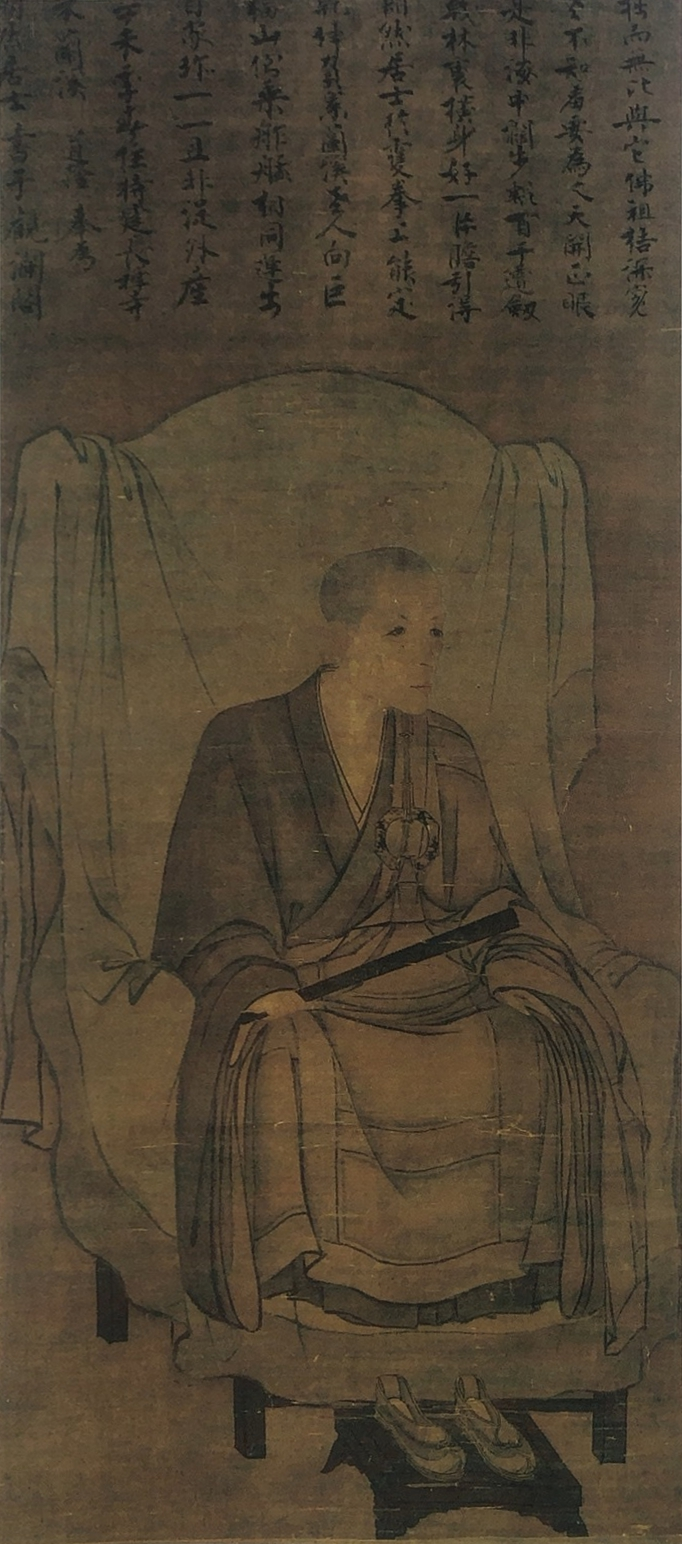
- Born: c. 1213; Sichuan Province, China
- Died: c. 1278

Lanxi Daolong (traditional Chinese: 蘭溪道隆; simplified Chinese: 兰溪道隆; pinyin: Lánxī Dàolóng; Wade–Giles: Lan-hsi Tao-long; Japanese: 蘭渓道隆, romanized: Rankei Dōryū; c. 1213–1278), born in Sichuan Province, China in 1213 A.D. (Southern Song dynasty), was a famous Chinese Buddhist monk, calligrapher, idealist philosopher, and is the founder of the Kenchō-ji sect, which is a branch of the Rinzai school.

Lanxi Daolong entered temple life at the age of thirteen. During the Song dynasty, he went to Japan at the invitation of Hōjō Tokiyori. He founded Kenchō-ji in 1253.

Lanxi Daolong's calligraphy was famous in Japan, especially his Rule of Zen (法语规则). Daolong died in Kenchō-ji and was given the posthumous name of Dajue Zen Master (大覚禅師, Daikaku Zenji in Japanese) by Emperor Go-Uda (後宇多天皇). Throughout his lifetime, he made great contributions to promote Sino-Japanese cultural interactions.

== Biography ==
=== Early life in China ===
Lanxi Daolong was born in Lanxi, Fujiang, Sichuan Province (presently Mianyang, Sichuan Province) in 1213 (in the Jiading period of the Southern Song dynasty) and died in Japan on July 24, 1278, at 2pm. It is difficult to trace his parenthood and the living conditions of his childhood. We only know that the family name of Lanxi Daolong was Ran. According to Biographies of Monks (高僧传), Lanxi Daolong displayed purity, excellence and bravery.

In 1226, at the age of 13, he went to Daci Temple (zh:大慈寺), Chengdu, and he was tonsured to participate in various forms of Zen learning in 1227. Later, he went to Zhejiang Province to learn Zen from Wuzhun Shifan in Wanshou Temple (万寿寺), and finally became a disciple of Chijue Daochong, Beijian Jujian and so on. Daolong persevered in learning dhyana there. Before long he began to travel through Hunan, Hubei and Jiangxi, finally settling down in Yangshan (in Wuxi, Jiangsu) where he learned Zen from Renjue (formerly known as Wuming Huixing, 1160–1237) in Cuiwei Temple.

=== Travel to Japan ===
In the autumn of the 6th year of Chunhu (AD 1246), at the age of 33, Lanxi Daolong left for Japan with his disciples and two statues of the Buddha to preach Zen, boarding a Japanese merchant ship from Tiantong Temple in Ningbo, Zhejiang. First, he arrived in Daizaifu (太宰府) and wrote The rite of sitting in meditation (坐禅仪) to instruct his followers. In the second year, he arrived in Kyoto and lived in Sennyū-ji (泉涌寺), a Ritsu temple. After spending some years in Kyushu and Kyoto, Lanxi Daolong came to Kamakura. In 1248, he went to Kikokuzan Kongō Jufuku Zenji (亀谷山金剛寿福禅寺), a temple of the Kenchō-ji branch of the Rinzai sect, usually known as Jufuku-ji (寿福寺).

In 1249, Hōjō Tokiyori (北條時賴), the fifth shikken (regent) of the Kamakura shogunate, decided to build a Zen training monastery, and at that time, he had converted to Lanxi Daolong. Built according to the architectural style of the Chinese Song dynasty, Kenchō-ji (建長寺), a Rinzai Zen temple, was constructed on the orders of Emperor Go-Fukakusa (後深草天皇) in Kamakura and completed in 1253, fifth year of the Kenchō era, from which it takes its name, and Lanxi Daolong became its first abbot. Lanxi Daolong preached Zen in Kamakura for 13 years. Later Emperor Kameyama (亀山天皇) recalled Lanxi Daolong to Kyoto and appointed him the eleventh abbot of Kennin-ji (建仁寺). Lanxi Daolong made it a purely Zen institution, and three years later, he returned to Kamakura. There he was exiled twice to Kōshū (甲州). He built more than 20 temples during his exile in Kōshū, Shinshū (信州) and Ōshū (奥州). Hōjō Tokimune (北条時宗) remitted Lanxi Daolong and greeted him back to Kamakura. Lanxi Daolong selected a site for Engaku-ji (円覚寺), but in 1278, he died before the construction. After his nirvana, there are Buddha's relics. During his thirty-three-year stay in Japan, he built 49 temples and now these temples have become famous Buddhist architectures.

=== Works of calligraphy ===
In calligraphy, Lanxi Daolong imitated Huang Tingjian, Zhang Jizhi and Chu Suiliang’s works of calligraphy, developing a simple and straight calligraphy style inspired by them.

In the calligraphy circles of Japanese Buddhist temple, Lanxi Daolong was equal to Rong Xi. However, only a few works of his calligraphy are extant today. Two works of Rule of Zen (法语规则) and three works of The article of reading the variant Chinese characters (重文讽诵文) are now stored at Kenchō-ji (建長寺) and are national treasures of Japan. The work of Diamond Sutra (金刚经) preserved in the Da De temple of Kyoto is also an important work of his calligraphy.

== Influences on Japanese culture ==
=== Buddhism ===
Living in Japan for more than 30 years, Lanxi Daolong had great effects on Japanese culture. He was the first one to introduce the Pure Zen Buddhism of Song dynasty into Japan. In addition, Lanxi Daolong also brought the Song dynasty characterized culture into Japan, for instance, the Edo Neo-Confucianism and philosophy, the literature and art, the architectural aesthetics and the daily customs. By mixing them with Japanese culture, he accelerated the formation of Japanese Zen Buddhism. Moreover, Lanxi Daolong had strong supports from Japanese rulers, especially from the Kamakura Shogunate, which paved the road for the development of Zen Buddhism in Japan and helped it establish its leadership position in the various Japanese Buddhism sects. Furthermore, the Zen Buddhism had a great impact on the formation of the Bushidō and the national character of Japan.

=== Tea ===
As drinking tea was prevalent in Buddhist temples and the provinces of Jiangsu, Zhejiang and Sichuan, where Lanxi Daolong used to live, were the main tea-producing areas, he was deeply influenced by the tea culture. We can find many words and phrases concerning "drinking tea" in quotations from Lanxi Daolong. Therefore, Lanxi Daolong required his disciples to strictly follow the discipline of drinking tea, the way many people in Southern Song dynasty did. In this way Lanxi Daolong made contributions to the formation and spread of Japanese tea ceremony.

=== Drama ===
It is still inconclusive about his influence on Japanese drama. But Lanxi Daolong had written a poem in Japan. In this poem, he expressed the insights of Zen Buddhism by recalling the scene that he was seeing the Zaju in Sichuan province. By confirmation, Some scholars think that it is the important clue approving that Japanese drama was influenced by Zaju of Song dynasty. Thus, he was regarded as one of the important figures in the exchanges of Sino-Japanese drama culture.

=== Literature ===
Lanxi Daolong mainly used three forms to communicate Chinese literature with Japanese literature:

First, Lanxi Daolong quoted a large number of references of the Tang poetry and Song poetry and literary allusions when he preached Zen, for example "The cloud does at the end of the Castle Peak, but the pedestrian is outside the Castle Peak" (白云尽处是青山, 行人更在青山外)., "Disregard the changing circumstances" (刻舟求剑) and "Castles in the air" (画饼充饥).

Second, Daolong often wrote poems about Zen and his feelings. These poems were full of grace and charm, and had a great influence on Literature of the Five Mountains (ja:五山文学).

Third, Quotations from Lanxi Daolong, which was edited by the disciples of Lanxi Daolong, has enriched and improved the literary genre of Japanese Zen Quotations with Rich content, complete form, and wide propagation. It was regarded as one of the signs of maturity of Japanese Zen Quotations.
