= Kenchō-ji =

Temple in Kamakura, Kanagawa Prefecture, Japan

Kenchō-ji 建長寺
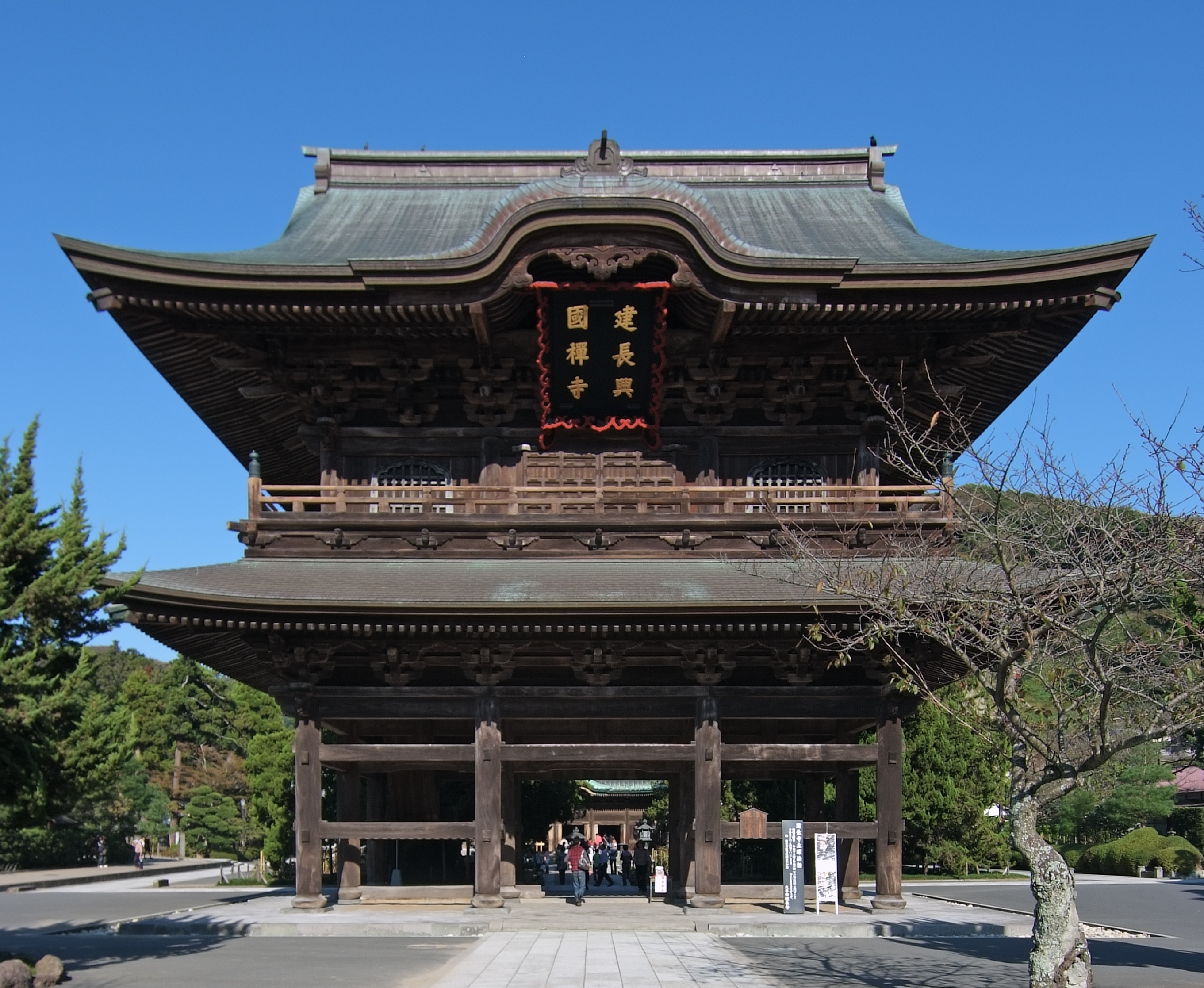
- Kenchō-ji, Sanmon

Religion
- Affiliation: Kenchō-ji Rinzai
- Deity: Jizō Bosatsu (Kṣitigarbha)
- Status: Head Temple, Five Mountain Temple (Kamakura)

Location
- Location: 8 Yamanouchi, Kamakura, Kanagawa Prefecture
- Country: Japan
- Interactive map of Kenchō-ji 建長寺
- Coordinates: 35°19′54.44″N 139°33′19.25″E

Architecture
- Founder: Hōjō Tokiyori and Rankei Doryū (Lanxi Daolong)
- Completed: 1253

Website
- www.kenchoji.com

Kenchō-ji (建長寺) is a Rinzai Zen temple in Kamakura, Kanagawa Prefecture, Japan, which ranks first among Kamakura's so-called Five Great Zen Temples (the Kamakura Gozan) and is the oldest Zen training monastery in Japan. These temples were at the top of the Five Mountain System, a network of Zen temples started by the Hōjō Regents. Still very large, it originally had a full shichidō garan and 49 subtemples. It was founded by Chinese monk Lanxi Daolong, also known as Rankei Doryū, of the Song dynasty at the invitation of Hōjō Tokiyori. The temple was constructed on the orders of Emperor Go-Fukakusa and completed in 1253, fifth year of the Kenchō era, from which it takes its name.

The sangō is Kofukusan (巨福山).

== Kenchō-ji and the shogunate ==
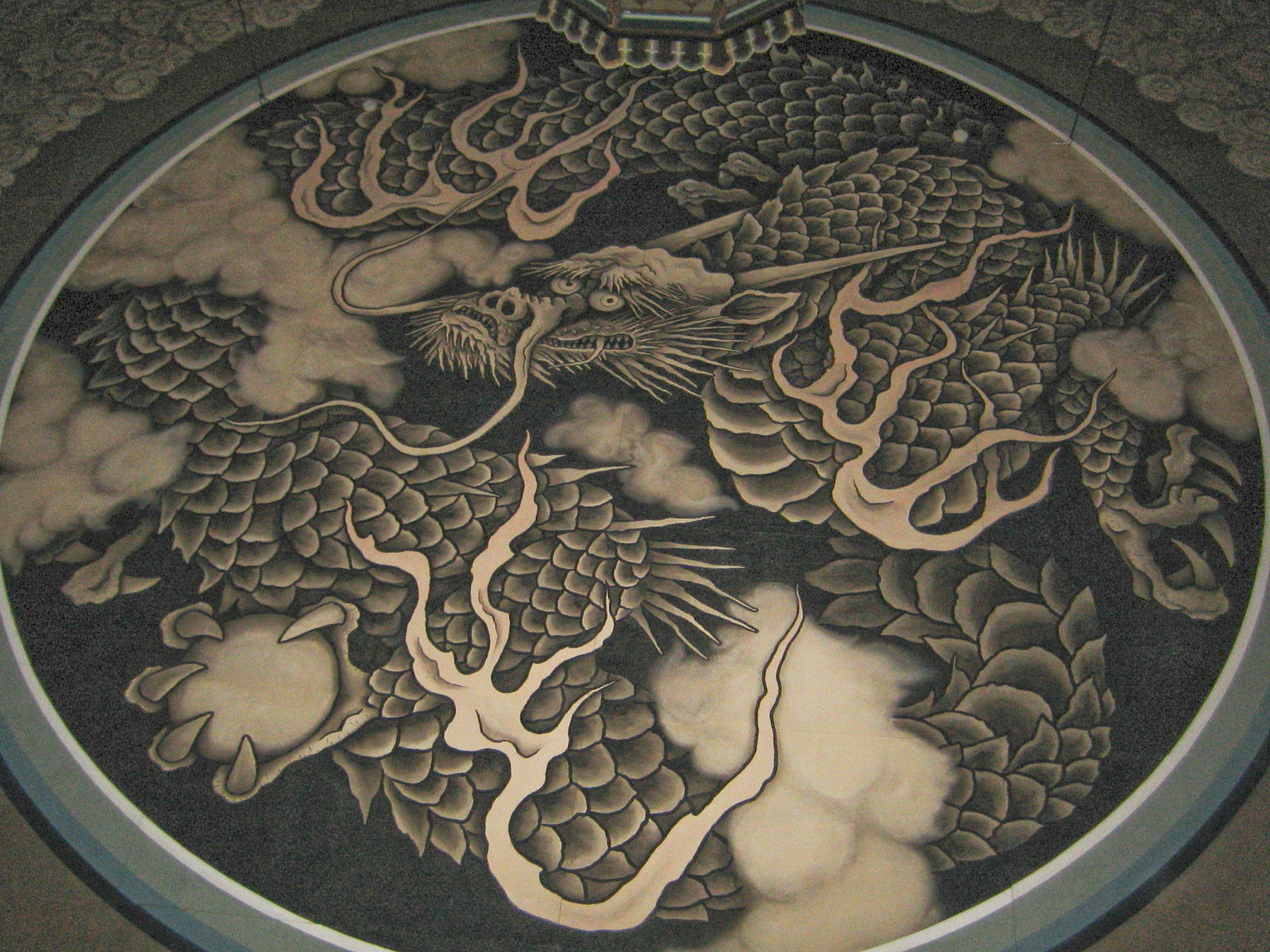
The dragon painted on the ceiling of the Hattō

Kamakura Regent Hōjō Tokiyori was the temple's main patron during its early years. The sponsorship was spiritual (he was close to a Zen master himself) as well as political: the Kamakura Gozan, organization of which this temple was head, had an important role in the shogunate's organization. The system, to which the Ashikaga added a series of five temples in Kyoto called the Kyoto Gozan, was adopted to promote Zen in Japan however, there as it had already happened in China, it was soon controlled and used by the country's ruling classes for their own administrative and political ends. The Gozan system allowed the temples at the top to function as de facto ministries, using their nationwide network of temples for the distribution of government laws and norms, and for the monitoring of local conditions for their military superiors. The Hōjō first, and the Ashikaga later were therefore able to disguise their power under a religious mask, while monks and priests worked for the government as translators, diplomats and advisers.

Under their masters' patronage, Kenchō-ji and the Five Mountain temples gradually became centers of learning and developed a characteristic literature called the Japanese Literature of the Five Mountains. During the Japanese Middle Ages, its scholars exerted a far-reaching influence on the internal political affairs of the country.

The Gozan system finally declined with the dissolution of the Ashikaga shogunate which had sponsored it. Kenchō-ji's own renaissance came in the 19th century under the guidance of Zen master Aozora Kandō.

== Buildings and points of interest ==
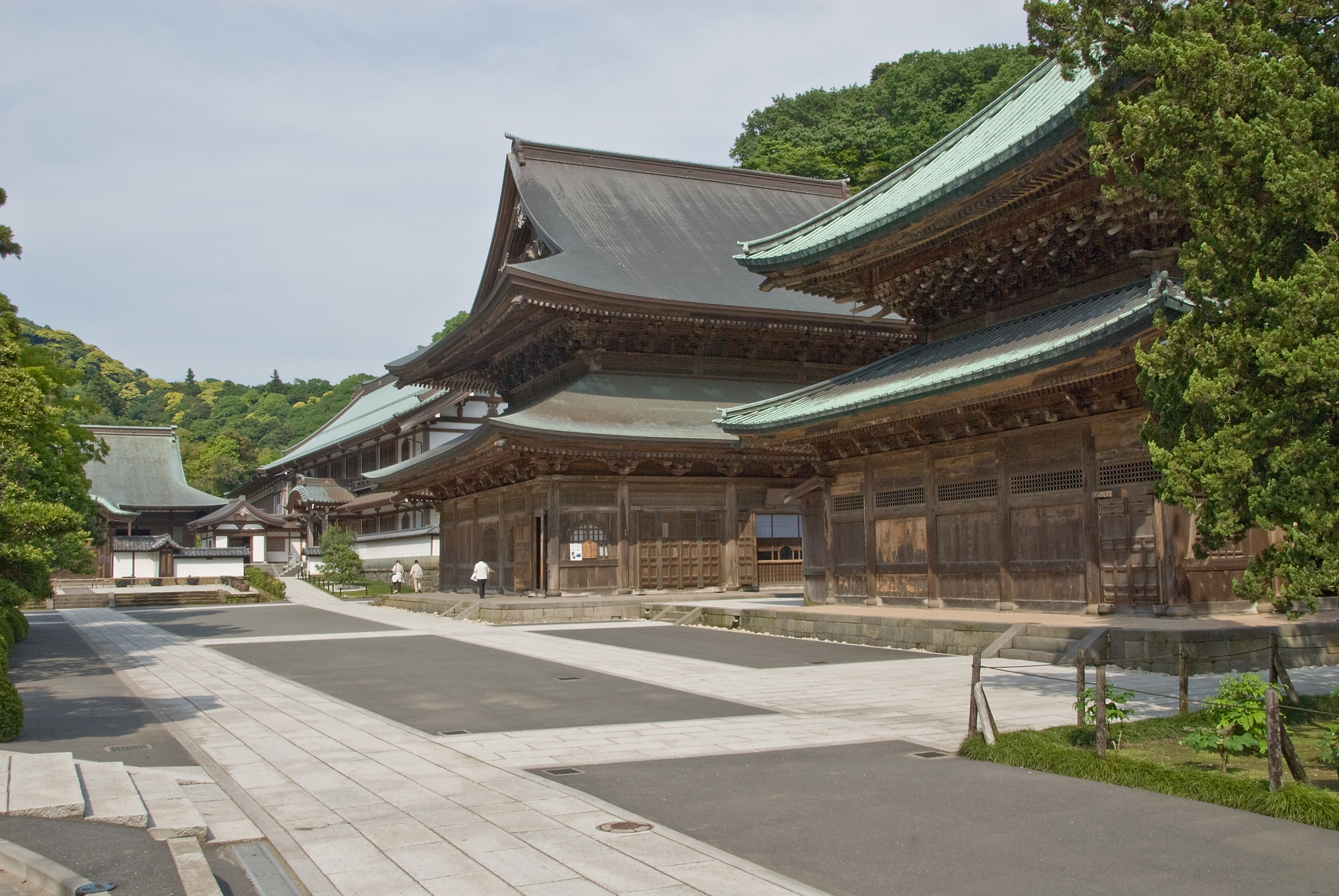
From right to left the junipers, the Butsuden, the Hattō, the Karamon and the two buildings composing the Hojō

Kenchō-ji originally consisted of a shichidō garan with 49 subtemples, but most of these were lost in fires in the 14th and 15th centuries. It still is a classic example of a Zen garan with its buildings aligned north to south. The complex currently consists of ten subtemples. Its most important structures include (in order from the first gate):

- The Sōmon (outer gate), where the ticket booths are, which was moved here from the Hanju Zanmai-in temple in Kyoto.
- The Sanmon (Main Gate), built in 1754 with donations from all over the Kantō region. According to a popular legend, a raccoon dog (a tanuki) helped raise the money transforming himself into a monk to repay the kindness of the temple's priests. For this reason, even today the sanmon is often called Tanuki-mon (狸門, Tanuki gate).
- The Bonshō (Temple Bell), cast in 1255, which is a National Treasure.
- The Butsuden (lit. Buddha Hall), an Important Cultural Property which was moved to Kamakura from Zōjō-ji in Tokyo in 1647.
- The Hattō (Dharma Hall), built in 1814, where public ceremonies are held. It is the largest Buddhist wooden structure in Eastern Japan.
- The Karamon (Grand Gate), another Important Cultural Property, was brought here from Zōjō-ji together with the Butsuden.
- The Hōjō (the head priest's living quarters), also moved from the Hanju Zanmai-in in Kyoto, used for religious ceremonies.
- The Monastery, where monks are trained in meditation, which is however permanently closed to the public. It consists of a Zen-dō (meditation hall), of a kaisan-dō (founder's hall, a hall enshrining the temple's founder) and of the administrative offices.
- The large Zen garden behind the Hōjō called Shin-ji Ike (心字池, Mind character pond) and which is shaped like the Chinese character for mind (心), was designed by famous Zen teacher, scholar, poet, and garden designer Musō Soseki.
- A recent ceiling painting by Koizumi Junsaku (2003) portraying a dragon decorates the ceiling of the Hattō, the building behind the Butsuden. For this reason, the Hattō is often called Ryūō-den (龍王殿).

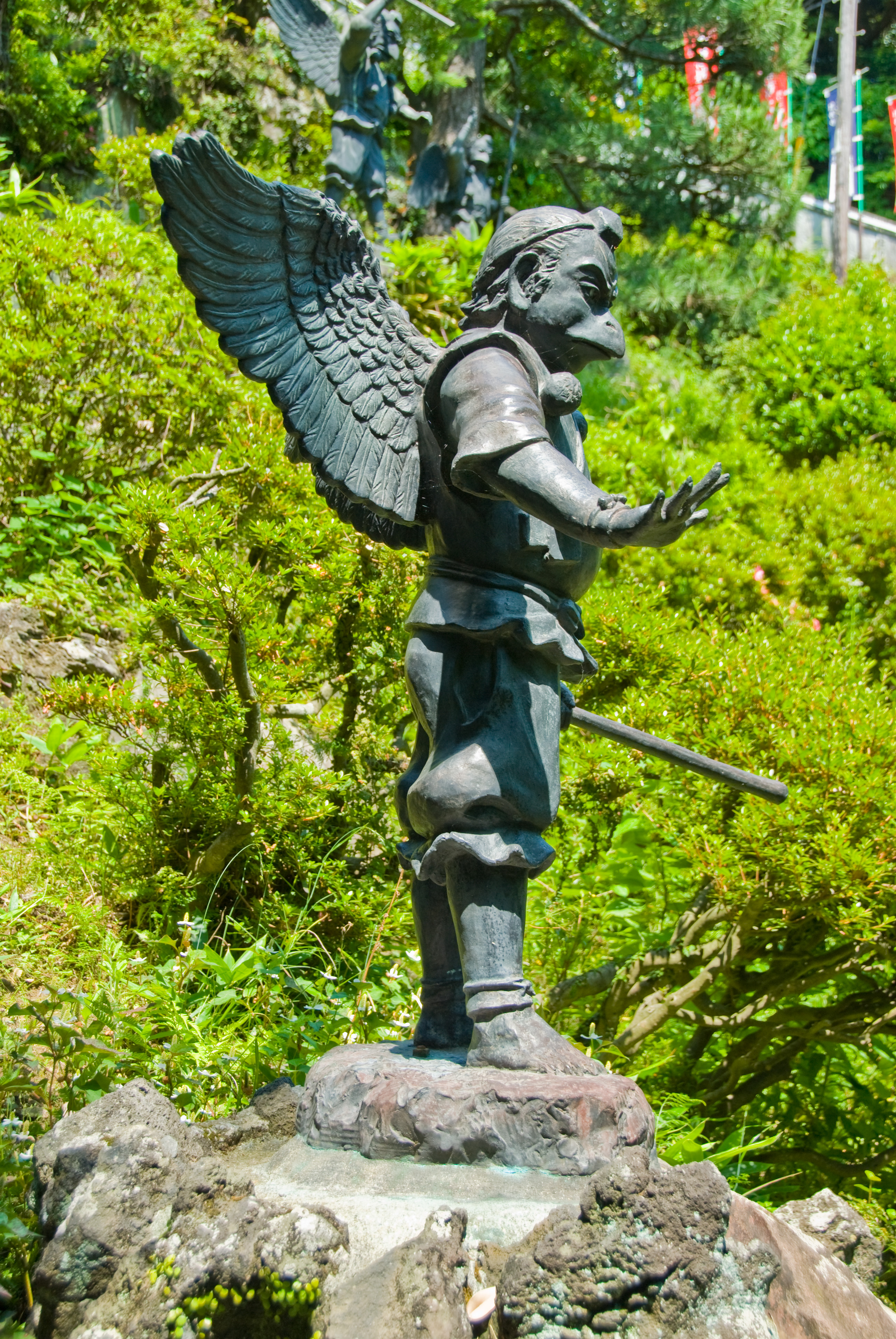
The Karasu-tengu to whom the Hansōbō is dedicated

In front of the Butsuden stand some great Chinese juniper trees which have been designated Natural Treasures. At the time of the founding of the temple, these big trees were simple saplings brought from China by the founder Doryū. Underneath the biggest a great stone monument surrounded by chains commemorates those of Kamakura's citizens who died during the Russo-Japanese War of 1904–05.

=== Hansōbō ===
Near the end of the temple's garden, over a hill stands the Hansōbō, the temple's large tutelary Shinto shrine. The enshrined spirit is the Hansōbō Daigongen. The gongen was originally the tutelary spirit (chinju (鎮守/鎮主)) of Hōkō-ji in Shizuoka and was brought here in 1890 by Aozora Kandō. The statues on the stairs leading to the shrine represent Tengu, entities similar to goblins which accompany the gongen. Some of the creatures have wings and a beak: they are a type of tengu called Karasu-tengu (crow tengu) because of their appearance. On a clear day, from the shrine one can see Mount Fuji to the west, and Sagami bay and Izu Ōshima to the south. The stones in the garden are full of names: they are those of the faithful who donated to the temple, and which belong to over 100 different religious organizations. This area used to be the temple's Inner Sanctuary, which still stands among the trees at the very top of the hill and which can be reached going up the steep stairs that begin on the right of the shrine, in front of the Jizō-dō. Next to the sanctuary there's an observation deck from which, on clear days, are visible Kamakura, Yuigahama and Mount Fuji.

At the very end of the garden, next to the Hansōbō, on a small hill overlooking a lake stands the Kaishun-in. This remote temple was built in 1334 and enshrines a statue of Monju Bosatsu.

== Sanmon Kajiwara Segaki-e ==
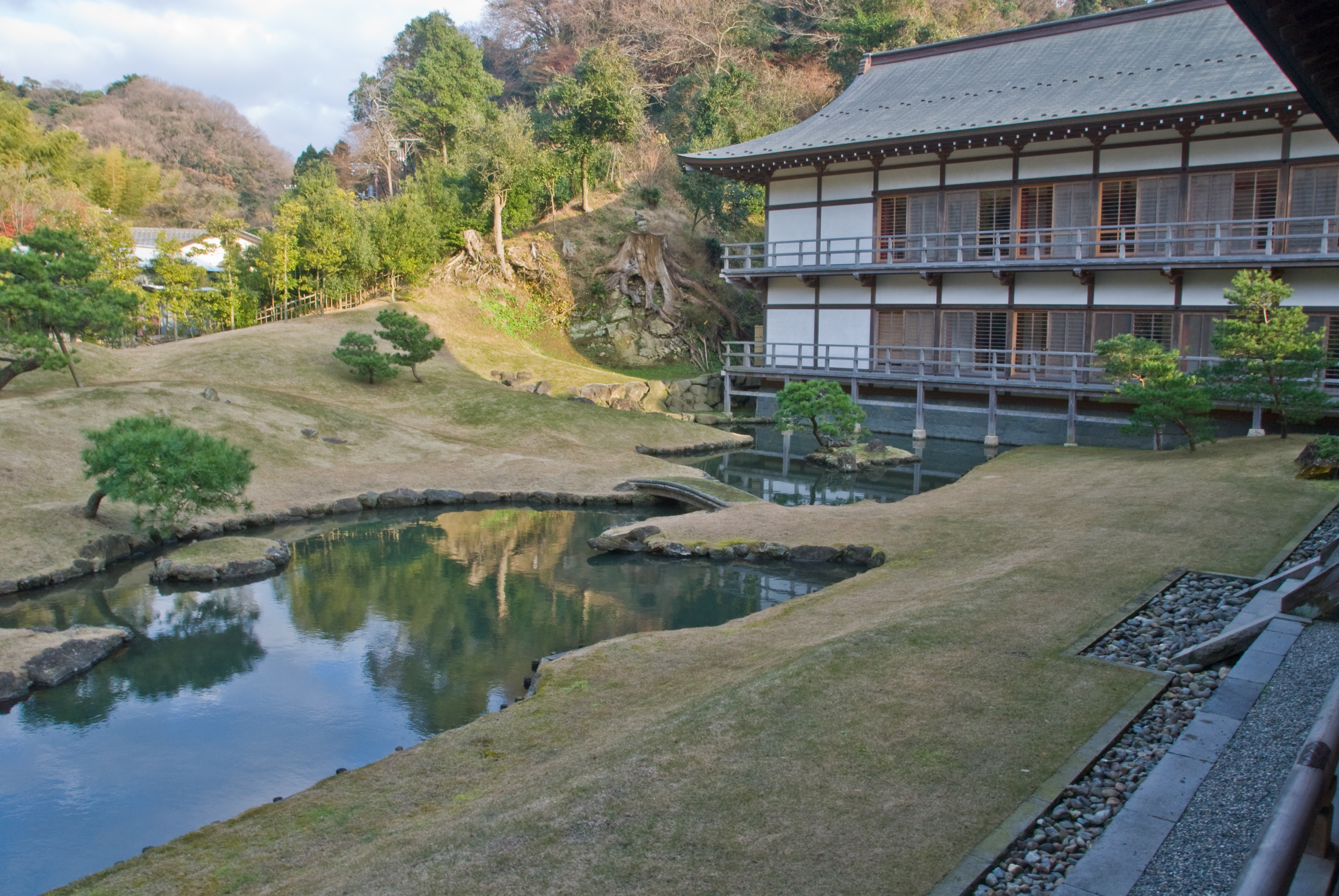
The Zen Garden behind the Hōjō and its pond

On the 15th of July (Obon, or the festival of the dead) Kenchō-ji celebrates the famous Sanmon Kajiwara Segaki-e (三門梶原施餓鬼会) funerary ceremony. The normal funeral rites take place early in the morning under the Sanmon gate. Only at Kenchō-ji, they are later repeated expressly for the soul of Kajiwara Kagetoki, a Kamakura period samurai who died during the political turmoil that followed the death of Minamoto no Sanetomo.

The origins of the ceremony are said to go back to the days of Doryū. The legend says that one day, right after the end of a segaki, (a Buddhist service in favor of suffering spirits) a ghostly figure appeared. Having discovered that the segaki was already over, the warrior seemed so sad that the priest repeated the ceremony just for him. Afterwards, the man revealed he was the ghost of Kajiwara Kagetoki.

== See also ==
- List of National Treasures of Japan (writings)
- List of National Treasures of Japan (crafts-others)
- Kenchin jiru
