= Kanazawa Bunko =

Museum in Japan

Coordinates: 35.34391°N 139.62875°E

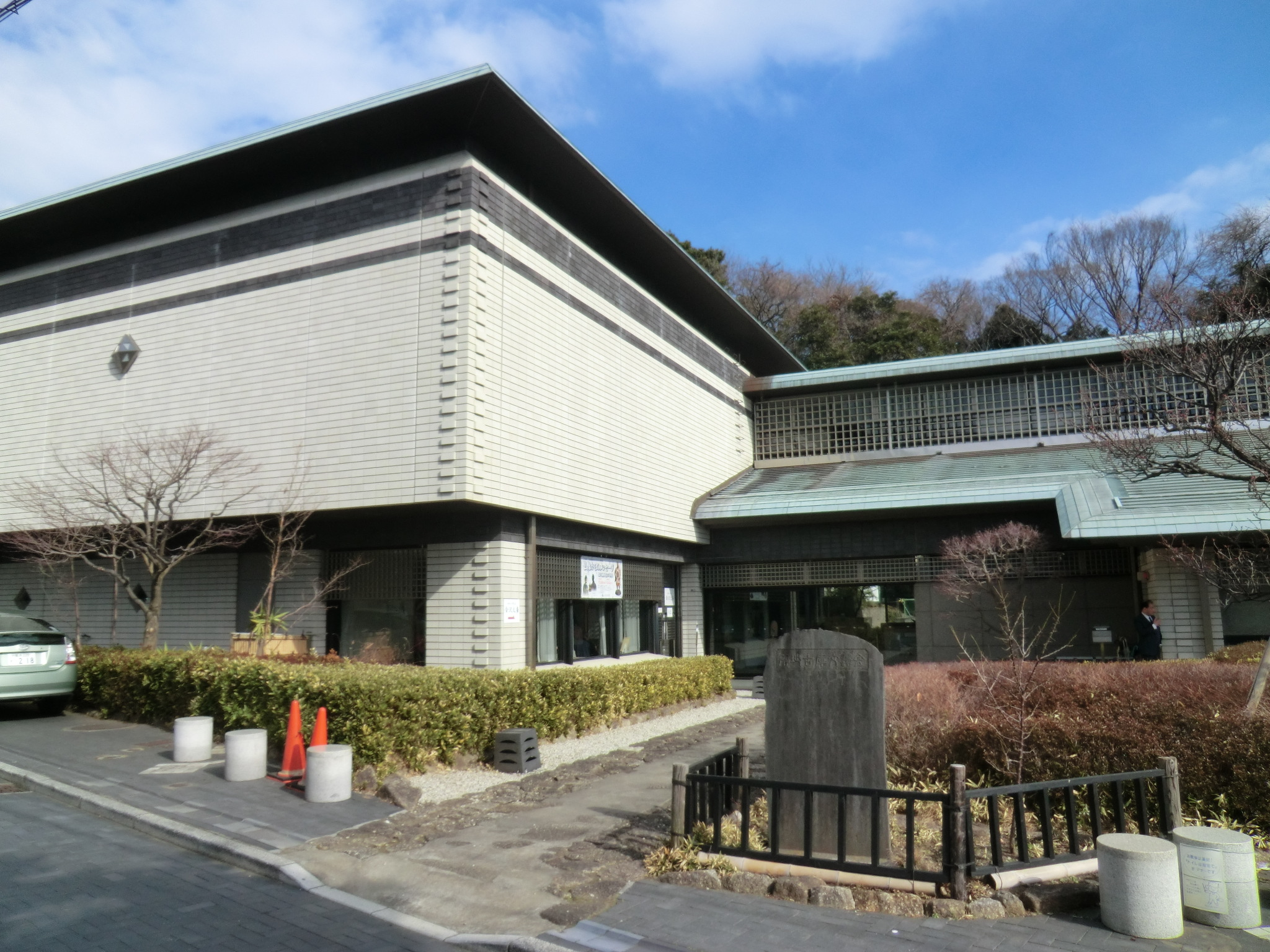
Kanazawa Bunko

Kanazawa Bunko (金沢文庫), formally titled the Kanagawa Prefectural Kanazawa-Bunko Museum, is a museum located in Kanazawa Ward, Yokohama, Japan. It features a collection of traditional Japanese and Chinese art objects, many dating from the Kamakura period.

Originally built as a private library, Kanazawa Bunko was one of the two most important centers of learning in medieval Japan, with Ashikaga Gakkō being the other. The library was opened in 1275 by Hōjō Sanetoki (1224–76), a grandson of Hōjō Yoshitoki, second regent of the Kamakura shogunate. The library's collection has not remained intact, although some original documents remain. The existing building, built in 1990, houses the existing collection.

The art collection of the Kanazawa Bunko includes Kamakura portraits, calligraphy, Chinese and Japanese classics, Buddhist sutras, and Zen writings. It is housed in a building within the Shōmyōji temple's precincts, though in a separate building. The collection includes an eleven-headed Kannon (Goddess of Mercy), a Miroku, a map of Japan, and other images designated as Important Cultural Properties.

Kanazawa Bunko shares its name with the nearby Kanazawa-Bunko Station, which is a limited express stop station on the Keikyu Main Line of Keikyu Railways.
