= Kakitsu uprising =

The Kakitsu uprising (嘉吉の徳政一揆 or 嘉吉の土一揆, Kakitsu no Tokusei Ikki or Kakitsu no Tsuchi Ikki) was a peasant uprising demanding debt cancellation that occurred in 1441, the 1st year of Kakitsu, in Kyoto and surrounding areas such as Ōmi Province.

== Background ==
In August, amidst the political chaos following the assassination in June of the 6th shōgun Ashikaga Yoshinori, peasants revolted, with the bashaku of Kyoto and Sakamoto and Otsu in Ōmi Province at their core, in demand of a comprehensive debt cancellation order on the basis of "daihajime no tokusei", debt relief on the occasion of the ascension of a new shōgun. Jizamurai took the leadership of the movement and it swelled into a revolt of several tens of thousands of people. This insurrection did not spread everywhere, but rather formed a ring around Kyoto.

== Rebellion ==
After severing communication between Kyoto and the outside world, the rebel army attacked sake merchants, storehouse money brokers, and temples. Under the guidance of ji-samurai, the rebel force acted in an organized manner and kept a lid on wanton looting. They occupied Tō-ji and Kitano Tenmangū and blockaded Tanbaguchi and Nishihachijou.

At the beginning of the uprising Mitsutsuna Rokkaku, the shugo of Ōmi Province, issued his debt's cancellation order, but because Enryaku-ji opposed it, their contracted bashaku of Omi were alienated from the rebels and even opposed them as they went further in occupying Kiyomizu-dera.

While the shogunate at first intended to get a handle on the situation by promulgating a debt relief order for peasants only, the rebels were trying to get the support of members of the establishment by demanding comprehensive debt cancellation at a flat province-wide rate that also included the kuge and buke. Furthermore, the kanrei Mochiyuki Hosokawa had accepted a bribe of 1,000 kanmon from the storehouse money brokers before he released an order to dispatch troops for their protection, and the daimyō who knew about the bribe refused his order. In the case of the daimyō Mochikuni Hatakeyama, he opposed the suppression of the uprising because his own vassals were involved in it, and the situation became even more chaotic.

Finally the 7th shōgun Ashikaga Yoshikatsu accepted their demands and issued a comprehensive debt cancellation order, the "Yamashiro Ikkoku Heikin Tokuseirei", which included debt from land sold in perpetuity by farmers less than 20 years ago. Because the shogunate released an official debt cancellation order, as opposed to their eventual refusal to do so during the Shōchō Uprising, the shogunate's authority was greatly damaged.

== Bibliography ==
- Akira Imatani『足利将軍暗殺 嘉吉土一揆の背景』（新人物往来社、1994年） ISBN 4-404-02098-8
- Akira Imatani『土民嗷々 一四四一年の社会史』（東京創元社 創元ライブラリ、2001年） ISBN 4-488-07040-X 上著の文庫版
