= Futai =

Futai or Fu Tai may refer to:

- Fu Tai (constituency) in Tuen Mun District, Hong Kong
- Futai, Jilin, town in Panshi, Jilin, China
- Futai Dam in Yuzawa, Niigata Prefecture, Japan
- Futai-ji or Futai Temple in Nara, Japan
