= Bashaku =

Japanese traders from history

The bashaku (馬借, bashaku) were Japanese teamsters or cargo carriers who used horses to transport their shipments. They were chiefly active between the Heian Period and the Sengoku Period. Images of the bashaku are famously drawn on the emakimono depicting the founding of Ishiyama-dera.

During the same time period cargo carriers who used oxen instead were known as shashaku.

== Transportation methods ==
The transportation method of the bashaku was to hang the cargo from the back of their horses and then drive them to their destination. In the beginning farmers did this job during their free time on off-seasons but from the Muromachi Period and onwards it became a full-time occupation.

The bashaku lived in groups in towns along major highways and important sites of water to land traffic including Otsu, Sakamoto, and Yodo, and they carried goods brought by boat to areas where consumption was at that time high such as Kyoto and Nara.

== Uprisings ==
Because of their organizational strength and the ease with which they could get news, and eventually their employment of armed escorts due to poor public security, they also became a source of rebellions during the Muromachi Period. The most famous of these revolts are the Shocho Uprising and the Kakitsu Uprising. However, when Mount Hiei’s Enryaku-ji became the target of attacks in the latter uprising, the bashaku of Omi Province, who had received the temple's protection seceded from the rebels and the power of the bashaku split.

During the Hokke Rebellion of 1532, Enryaku-ji took the lead in suppressing the bashaku. Bashaku members blockaded checkpoints connecting to Kyoto and thus imposed an economic embargo on the city where the power of militant Nichiren Buddhists held sway.
