= List of national treasures of Japan (writings: Classical Chinese books) =

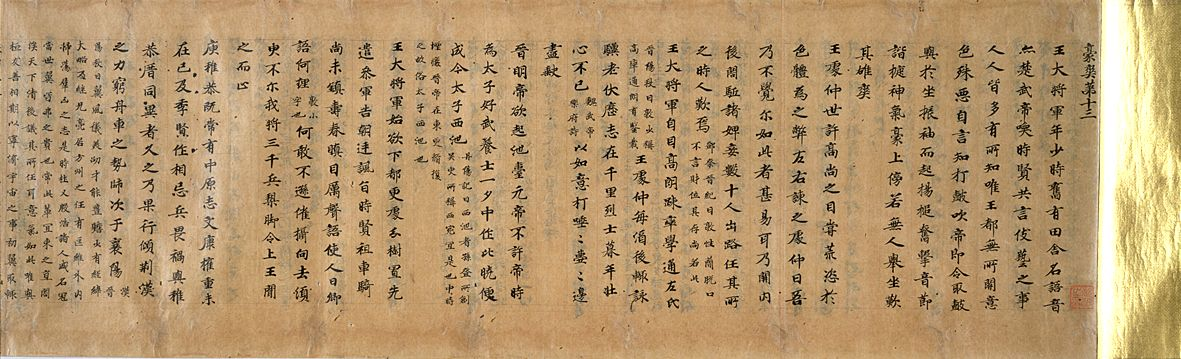
Part of the oldest extant transcription of A New Account of the Tales of the World, a collection of anecdotes about distinguished people of the Later Han dynasty to the Eastern Jin dynasty.

The term "national treasure" has been used in Japan to denote cultural properties since 1897, although the definition and the criteria have changed since the introduction of the term. The written materials in the list adhere to the current definition, and have been designated national treasures according to the Law for the Protection of Cultural Properties that came into effect on June 9, 1951. The items are selected by the Ministry of Education, Culture, Sports, Science and Technology based on their "especially high historical or artistic value". The list presents 58 entries from the 6th century Northern and Southern dynasties to the Kamakura period with more than half originating in China. The total number of items is higher, however, since groups of related objects have been joined as single entries. The list contains works that have been originally compiled in China by Chinese authors. A large proportion of these works are Chinese classics.

Written language was introduced to Japan around 400 AD in the form of Chinese books written in Classical Chinese. Japanese interest in Chinese writings and culture gradually increased towards the end of the 6th century when Japanese rulers sent missions to the mainland for cultural studies and to bring back books. During circa 300 years in the Sui and Tang dynasties, a large number of Chinese books were brought to Japan. By the 8th century, Chinese works were customarily copied at Japanese libraries to satisfy the demand for education of the male aristocracy. Until the early 17th century, copying in Japan was largely by hand. However, Chinese printed editions of the Song dynasty were imported following an increased trading activity at the start of the Kamakura period (after 1192). The designated manuscripts are either transcriptions of the original works produced in China or in Japan or are Chinese printed editions. The Chinese manuscripts, both handwritten and printed editions, were imported to Japan at the time. The designated treasures are housed in temples, museums, libraries, shrines, universities and in private collections.

The objects in this list represent about one fourth of the 237 national treasures in the category "writings". They are complemented by 72 Japanese book national treasures of the List of national treasures of Japan (writings: Japanese books) and 107 other written national treasures of the List of national treasures of Japan (writings: others).

== Statistics ==
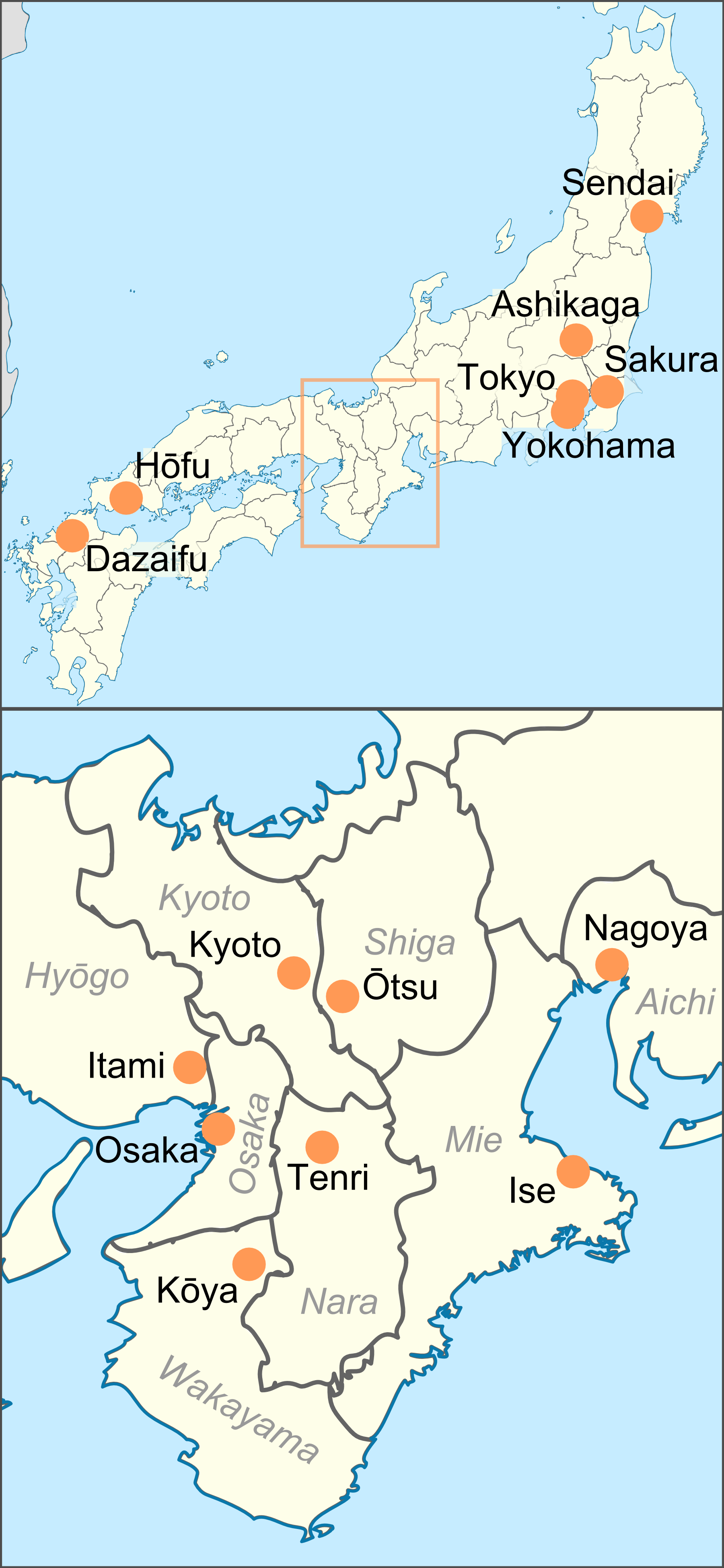
Map showing the location of Chinese book writings national treasures in Japan

Prefecture	City	National treasures
Aichi	Nagoya	3
Chiba	Sakura	3
Fukuoka	Dazaifu	1
Hyōgo	Itami	1
Kanagawa	Yokohama	1
Kyoto	Kyoto	9
Mie	Ise	1
Miyagi	Sendai	1
Nara	Tenri	2
Osaka	Osaka	4
Shiga	Ōtsu	5
Tochigi	Ashikaga	4
Tokyo	Tokyo	20
Wakayama	Kōya	2
Yamaguchi	Hōfu	1

Period (Note: Only the oldest period is counted, if a national treasure consists of items from more than one period.)	National treasures
Northern and Southern dynasties	1
Tang dynasty	22
Nara period	4
Heian period	15
Southern Song dynasty	14
Kamakura period	2

== Usage ==
The table's columns (except for Remarks and Image) are sortable by pressing the arrows symbols. The following gives an overview of what is included in the table and how the sorting works.

- Name: the name as registered in the Database of National Cultural Properties
- Authors: name of the author(s)
- Remarks: information about the type of document and its content
- Date: period and year; The column entries sort by year. If only a period is known, they sort by the start year of that period.
- Format: principal type, technique and dimensions; The column entries sort by the main type: scroll (includes handscrolls and letters), books (includes albums, ordinary bound books and books bound by fukuro-toji) (Note: (袋とじ) binding folded uncut pages in a book, so that there are two blank pages between two pages outside.) and other (includes hanging scrolls)
- Present location: "temple/museum/shrine-name town-name prefecture-name"; The column entries sort as "prefecture-name town-name".
- Image: picture of the manuscript or of a characteristic document in a group of manuscripts

== Treasures ==
=== Chinese manuscripts ===
Japan's first experience with books and written language (Note: Inscriptions on imported coins and artefacts are older but were not perceived as language by the Japanese at the time.) came from books written in Classical Chinese in China, brought to Japan from the Korean kingdoms, at least by the 5th and probably by the end of the 4th century. According to legend, the scholar Wani came to Japan in 406 and brought with him the Confucian Analects and Thousand Character Classic. (Note: The Thousand Character Classic as known today was not compiled at the time of Wani throwing doubt on the accuracy of this legend.) These were followed, in later years, by the Five Classics (Book of Odes, Book of History, Book of Rites, Book of Changes and the Spring and Autumn Annals), which, by the 6th century, became well known among the Japanese literary elite. The Seventeen-article constitution, compiled in 604 by Prince Shōtoku, has quotations that allow the identification of 18 Chinese books known to have existed in Japan at the time: Odes, Rites, Classic of Filial Piety, Analects, Chronicle of Zuo, the Han Chronicles (Book of Han and Book of the Later Han), Wen Xuan anthology, Zhuangzi and other classical Chinese writings. (Note: According to another source, the text composed by Prince Shōtoku shows familiarity with fifteen Chinese literary, historical, and philosophical works: the Odes, Book of History, Classic of Filial Piety, Analects, Chronicle of Zuo, Book of Rites, Guanzi, Records of the Grand Historian, Book of Han, Wen Xuan, Mencius, Mozi, Laozi, Zhuangzi and Han Feizi.)

The distribution of Chinese books to Japan reached its first peak in the Sui and Tang dynasties. During this period books were brought to Japan through two sources: people, who were mostly literate, moving from the continent; and by official missions sent out by the Japanese court. Four envoys to Sui China were dispatched under Prince Shōtoku, but this number quickly increased during the Tang dynasty, which saw 16 envoys of circa 200 to 600 people, each sent to study Chinese culture and to acquire Chinese books. One of the most well-known missions was that by Kibi Makibi who left Japan in 717, spent 17 years in China and returned with books on various subjects. Examples of works imported during this period include the first Chinese pharmacopoeia (Xinxiu Bencao), compiled and imported in the same year (713), and Tang poetry by Li Bai, Wang Wei and Bai Juyi. (Note: Bai Juyi was the most influential Tang Dynasty poet in Japan and his collected works were imported in 836.) Towards the end of the Tang dynasty, at the end of the 9th century, about half of the canon of Chinese literature was present in Japan, including texts of all major Tang poets. The Book Catalogue in Japan, compiled between 876 and 884 by the aristocrat and scholar Fujiwara no Sukeyo, showed entries for 1,568 Chinese books, located in Japan, in classics, history, philosophy and anthologies. Due to the cessation of missions to China in the late 9th century, relatively few Chinese books were imported through the mid and late Heian period.

Some books such as the Yupian or the Meihōki were lost early in China, because of the persecution against Buddhism or for other reasons. The titles survived, however, because of the large volume of books previously imported to Japan, which were then subsequently re-exported to China. Today, some of the oldest extant manuscripts of Chinese books dating to the Tang dynasty are located in Japan. Few of the early imported manuscripts have survived. Some of those that survived are listed as national treasures below. Twenty two Chinese book national treasures exist that were created in China and subsequently imported to Japan. Of these, 20 date to the Tang dynasty, one to the Southern Song and one to the Northern and Southern dynasties. The designated items are of various type: seven treasures are manuscripts of the Five Classics of Confucianism and associated commentaries, four are poetry and prose anthologies of Chinese poets, calligraphers and Emperor Huizong of Song, four are dictionaries, five are anecdote collections, one is a music score and one a traced copy of a letter.

Name	Authors	Remarks	Date	Format	Present location	Image
Wang Bo collection (王勃集, Ōbotsu-shū) vol. 28	unknown	Ueno Family collection; part of a 30 volume collection	Tang dynasty	One handscroll	private, Tokyo	
Commentary on the analects of Confucius (論語疏巻第六, rongo sokan dairoku)	unknown	Oldest surviving manuscript of Huang Kan's Lunyu Yishu	Northern and Southern dynasties -- Sui dynasty, 6th century	One handscroll, ink on paper, 27.2 cm × 1,090.8 cm (10.7 in × 429.4 in)	Keio University, Tokyo	
喪乱帖 (Sōranjō)	Copy of calligraphy by Wang Xizhi	A traced copy of a letter originally from 356 expressing the sorrow that the ancestral grave was destroyed by war.	Tang dynasty, 8th century	One hanging scroll, ink on bamboo blind patterned paper, 26.2 cm × 58.9 cm (10.3 in × 23.2 in)	Museum of the Imperial Collections, Tokyo	
Wang Bo collection (王勃集, Ōbotsu-shū) vol. 29, 30	unknown	Oldest extant copy of a portion of Wang Bo's 30 scroll collected writings: one verse from the biography section, five of six verses from the prayer section (all vol. 29) and four memorial prayer verses (vol. 30); brought from China during the Nara period and stored at Kōfuku-ji; later owned by the painter Tomioka Tessai	Tang dynasty, 7th–8th century	One handscroll, ink on paper, 26.5 cm × 447.7 cm (10.4 in × 176.3 in)	Tokyo National Museum, Tokyo	
Spring and Autumn Annals collected commentaries (春秋経伝集解, Shunjū keiden shikkai) fragments of vol. 2	unknown	Reverse side contains a 1078 transcription by a Kōyasan monk; manuscript returned to China during the Meiji period, returned to Japan 50 years later	Tang dynasty, 7–8th century	One scroll, ink on paper	Fujii Saiseikai Yūrinkan Museum, Kyoto	
Book of Han, biography of Sima Xiangru (漢書楊雄伝, Kanjo yōyūden) vol. 57	unknown	—	Tang dynasty	One scroll, ink on paper	private, Tokyo	—
Anthology of Emperor Huizong of Song (徽宗文集序, Kisō bunshūjo)	Emperor Gaozong of Song	Written in regular script	Southern Song, 1154	One scroll, ink on paper, 27.4 cm × 137.0 cm (10.8 in × 53.9 in)	Agency for Cultural Affairs, Tokyo	
Classic of Rites annotated edition (礼記子本疏義, raiki shihonsogi) vol. 59	Tei Shaku (鄭 灼)	Formerly in the possession of Tanaka Mitsuaki	Tang dynasty	One scroll, ink on paper, 28.5 cm × 642.5 cm (11.2 in × 253.0 in)	Waseda University, Tokyo	
Poetry anthology of members of the Hanlin Academy (翰林学士詩集, Kanrin gakushi shishū)	unknown	60 four and five character verses (shigonshi/gogonshi) by great calligraphers working under Emperor Taizong of Tang: Chu Suiliang, Ouyang Xun, Yu Shinan; reverse side contains a mid Heian period transcription of volume 5 of 正広智三蔵表制集	Tang dynasty	One scroll, ink on paper, 28 cm × 643 cm (11 in × 253 in)	Ōsu Kannon Hōshō-in (宝生院), Nagoya, Aichi	—
Yupian (玉篇, gyokuhen), fragments of vol. 9	unknown	Part of a 30 volume Chinese character dictionary	Tang dynasty, 8th century	One scroll, ink on paper, 26.9 cm × 1,625.9 cm (10.6 in × 640.1 in)	Waseda University, Tokyo	
Yupian (玉篇, gyokuhen), first half of vol. 27	unknown	Part of a 30 volume Chinese character dictionary; one half of an extant complete volume (Note: The second complementary half at Ishiyama-dera has been designated as a national treasure. The only other extant complete volume of the Yupian is vol. 22 and survives in a transcription made in Japan located Ise Shrine. It has been designated as a national treasure.)	Tang dynasty, 7th–8th century	One scroll, ink on paper, 27.2 cm × 915.0 cm (10.7 in × 360.2 in)	Kōzan-ji, Kyoto	
Yupian (玉篇, gyokuhen), second half of vol. 27	unknown	Part of a 30 volume Chinese character dictionary; one half of an extant complete volume (Note: The first complementary half at Kōzan-ji has been designated as a national treasure. The only other extant complete volume of the Yupian is vol. 22 and survives in a transcription made in Japan located Ise Shrine. It has been designated as a national treasure.)	Tang dynasty, 7th–8th century	One scroll, ink on paper	Ishiyama-dera, Ōtsu, Shiga	
Old-Script Document of Antiquities (Guwen Shangshu) (古文尚書, kobun shōsho), vol. 6	unknown	"Document of Antiquities" is another name for the Book of History; brought to Japan in Nara period; Japanese annotations from the mid-Heian period in red and black ink; on back of scroll: Genpisho, a document on the research of era names	Beginning of the Tang dynasty, 7th century	One scroll, ink on paper, 26.3 cm × 328.0 cm (10.4 in × 129.1 in)	Tokyo National Museum, Tokyo	
Document of Antiquities (Guwen Shangshu) (古文尚書, kobun shōsho), vol. 3, 5, 12	unknown	"Document of Antiquities" is another name for the Book of History; on back of scroll: Genpisho, a document on the research of era names	Tang dynasty	One scroll, ink on paper, 26.8 cm × 1,138 cm (10.6 in × 448.0 in)	Tōyō Bunko, Tokyo	—
Shuowen Jiezi (説文木部残巻, setsumon mokubu zankan; "Explaining Simple and Analyzing Compound Characters"), fragment	unknown	Chinese dictionary; oldest extant manuscript of this work; brought to Japan by Naitō Torajirō; fragment concerns the 木 section header	Tang dynasty, 9th century, presumably 820	One scroll of six pages, ink on paper, 25.4 cm × 243 cm (10.0 in × 95.7 in)	Takeda Science Foundation (武田科学振興財団, Takeda Kagaku Shinkōzaidan), Osaka	
A New Account of the Tales of the World (世説新書, sesetsu shinsho) fragments of vol. 6; parts of the "Admonitions and warnings" and "Quick perception" chapters	unknown	Collection of anecdotes about distinguished people of the Later Han dynasty to the Eastern Jin dynasty; backside contains transcription of an esoteric Buddhist manual; oldest extant transcription of this work; handed down in the Kanchi-in subtemple of Tō-ji; split in four parts (all national treasures) during the Meiji period	Tang dynasty, second half of 7th to first half of 8th century	One scroll, ink on linen paper,27.1 cm × 397.0 cm (10.7 in × 156.3 in)	Kyoto National Museum, Kyoto	
A New Account of the Tales of the World (世説新書, sesetsu shinsho) fragments of vol. 6; "Virile Vigor" chapter	unknown	Collection of anecdotes about distinguished people of the Later Han dynasty to the Eastern Jin dynasty; backside contains transcription of an esoteric Buddhist manual; oldest extant transcription of this work; handed down in the Kanchi-in subtemple of Tō-ji; split in four parts (all national treasures) during the Meiji period	Tang dynasty, second half of 7th to first half of 8th century	One scroll, ink on paper, 26.9 cm × 196.0 cm (10.6 in × 77.2 in)	Tokyo National Museum, Tokyo	
A New Account of the Tales of the World (世説新書, sesetsu shinsho) fragments of vol. 6	unknown	Collection of anecdotes about distinguished people of the Later Han dynasty to the Eastern Jin dynasty; backside contains transcription of an esoteric Buddhist manual; oldest extant transcription of this work; handed down in the Kanchi-in subtemple of Tō-ji; split in four parts (all national treasures) during the Meiji period	Tang dynasty, second half of 7th to first half of 8th century	One scroll, ink on paper	Agency for Cultural Affairs, Tokyo	
A New Account of the Tales of the World (世説新書, sesetsu shinsho) fragments of vol. 6	unknown	Collection of anecdotes about distinguished people of the Later Han dynasty to the Eastern Jin dynasty; backside contains transcription of an esoteric Buddhist manual; oldest extant transcription of this work; handed down in the Kanchi-in subtemple of Tō-ji; split in four parts (all national treasures) during the Meiji period	Tang dynasty, second half of 7th to first half of 8th century	One scroll, ink on paper	private Ninishi Shinemon (小西新右衛門), Itami, Hyōgo	—
Mao Shi (毛詩, mōshi) fragments of vol. 6; Zheng Jian edition	unknown	Collection of Chinese poems	early Tang dynasty	One scroll	Tōyō Bunko, Tokyo	
Meihōki (冥報記)	unknown	Collection of Buddhist karmic tales; oldest extant manuscript of this work; thought to have been brought to Japan by Engyō (円行), a pupil of Kūkai, in 838; one of two Chinese collections that the Nihon Ryōiki was modelled on	late Tang dynasty	Three scrolls, ink on paper, height: 28.2 cm (11.1 in), lengths: 339.3 cm (133.6 in), 557.7 cm (219.6 in) and 672.7 cm (264.8 in) for scrolls 1, 2 and 3	Kōzan-ji, Kyoto	
"Elegant Orchid" in the Jieshi Tuning (Jieshidiao Youlan) (碣石調幽蘭, kessekichōyūran) vol. 5	unknown	Abridged copy of "Score for the seven-stringed zither" (guqin); transcription of the original by the zither player Qiugong (also known as Ming) from Huiji province; in text explanation of the finger movements to perform the piece "Elegant Orchid" and titles of 59 pieces at the end; original lost in China	Tang dynasty, 7th–8th century	One handscroll, ink on paper, 27.4 cm × 423.1 cm (10.8 in × 166.6 in)	Tokyo National Museum, Tokyo	

=== Japanese manuscripts ===
In Japan, until the Heian period, the language of government and ritual was Classical Chinese in which was composed decrees, codes, commands, communications and certificates. Consequently, Chinese books were essential for the education of the (male) aristocracy, and beginning readers studied books such as the Mencius or the Thousand Character Classic. Towards the end of the 7th century, to prepare selected sons of the nobility for a government career, Emperor Tenji established the Daigaku-ryō ("Academy"). At first the curriculum consisted mainly of Confucian Classics and Chinese history. (Note: In addition medicine, astronomy, mathematics and music were taught.) Chinese learning thrived in the 9th century, and the academy's curriculum saw a rise in literary composition based on the Chinese books Wen Xuan, Records of the Grand Historian and the Books of Han and Later Han. Unlike in China at the time, Classical Confucian studies, especially the historical and political side of Confucianism, were still held in high esteem in the Heian period with commentaries used for study dating to the Han dynasty. In fact, one of the Japanese emperor's prescribed activities was listening to lectures on the Chinese classics, histories, and poetic anthologies.

Chinese books had reached Japan since circa 400 AD and had been imported in large quantities through a number of missions during the Sui and Tang dynasties. Official missions ended after 894, but books continued to reach Japan in the mid to late Heian period through commercial exchange or via priests travelling to China. Imported Chinese books were copied at Japanese libraries, but unlike sutra copying little is known about the actual copying process of Chinese secular works in Japan. The Japanese aristocracy and clergy sponsored the transcription of religious and government texts on a large scale by the Nara period.

The first state library was the Zusho-ryō ("Bureau of Archives") established by the Taihō Code from 701. (Note: Promulgated one year later in 702.) Attached to the Daigaku-ryō, it oversaw the custody (collection and preservation) and transmission of Buddhist and Confucian books from the Nara period, until its destruction by fire in the mid-Heian period (11th century). Collection depended largely on the copying of texts held elsewhere. In addition to the Zusho-ryō, books were also copied at imperial palace libraries, private libraries of aristocrats, temple libraries and at libraries of organs of the state. In the Heian period, the majority of works held in libraries (both those produced in China and those copied in Japan) consisted of Chinese works and scholarly collections were dominated by Chinese secular works. At the end of the Heian period, the great fire of Kyoto in 1177, and the burning of temples by the Taira in 1180, destroyed a large part of the literary heritage. During the Kamakura period, the warrior class founded new libraries such as the Kanazawa Bunko.

There are 23 Chinese book national treasures that are transcriptions produced in Japan. Of these four date to the Nara period, 17 to the Heian period and two to the Kamakura period. The designated items are of various type: four are historical chronicles, four are poetry collections, three are dictionaries or reference books, two are medical or botanical books and one is a book on politics.

Name	Authors	Remarks	Date	Format	Present location	Image
Records of the Grand Historian (史記, shiki; Chin. Shiji) vol. 10 of the Imperial Biographies (本紀; Chin. Benji): Chronicle of Emperor Wen of Han Dynasty	Ōe no Iekuni (大江家国)	Transcription; oldest manuscript of the shiki; handed down in the Ōe family	Heian period, 1073	One scroll, ink on paper, 28.5 cm × 972.7 cm (11.2 in × 383.0 in)	Tohoku University, Sendai, Miyagi	
Records of the Grand Historian (史記, shiki; Chin. Shiji), Kōzan-ji edition, vol. 2 and 5 of the Imperial Biographies (本紀; Chin. Benji): Chronicle of the Xia Dynasty and Chronicle of the Qin Dynasty	unknown	Transcription	Heian period, 1145	Two scrolls, ink on paper	Tōyō Bunko, Tokyo	—
Records of the Grand Historian (史記, shiki; Chin. Shiji), vol. 11 of the Imperial Biographies (本紀; Chin. Benji): Chronicle of the Emperor Jing of Han Dynasty	Ōe no Iekuni (大江家国)	Transcription; oldest manuscript of the shiki; handed down in the Ōe family	Heian period, 1073	One scroll, ink on paper	Daitōkyū Memorial Library (大東急記念文庫, daitōkyū kinen bunko), Tokyo	—
Records of the Grand Historian (史記, shiki; Chin. Shiji), vol. 9 of the Imperial Biographies (本紀; Chin. Benji): Chronicle of the Empress Lü Zhi Dynasty	Ōe no Iekuni (大江家国)	Transcription; oldest manuscript of the shiki; handed down in the Ōe family	Heian period, 1073	One scroll, ink on paper	Mōri Museum, Hōfu, Yamaguchi	
Records of the Grand Historian (史記, shiki; Chin. Shiji), vol. 96 and fragments of vol. 97	unknown	Transcription; oldest extant manuscripts of the shiki	Nara period, 8th century	One scroll, ink on paper	Ishiyama-dera, Ōtsu, Shiga	—
Spring and Autumn Annals collected commentaries (春秋経伝集解, Shunjū keiden shikkai), vol. 10	unknown	Part of a 30 volume work; backside contains considerations on the Diamond Realm	Heian period	One scroll, ink on paper	Tōyō Bunko, Tokyo	
Spring and Autumn Annals collected commentaries (春秋経伝集解, Shunjū keiden shikkai), fragments of vol. 26	unknown	Part of a 30 volume work	mid Heian period	One scroll, ink on paper	Ishiyama-dera, Ōtsu, Shiga	—
Spring and Autumn Annals collected commentaries (春秋経伝集解, Shunjū keiden shikkai), fragments of vol. 29	unknown	Part of a 30 volume work	mid Heian period	One scroll, ink on paper	Ishiyama-dera, Ōtsu, Shiga	—
Book of Han (漢書, kanjo), Annals of Han Gaozu No. 2 and fragments of No.4 from the section Biographies	unknown	Transcription; red annotations from the mid 10th century	Nara period	Two scrolls, ink on paper	Ishiyama-dera, Ōtsu, Shiga	—
Book of Han (漢書, kanjo), No. 4 from Treatise on food and merchandise	unknown	Transcription; end sheet with red ink marks of ministries of ceremonies	Nara–Heian period	One scroll, ink on jute paper, 20 sheets, 27 cm × 1,311 cm (11 in × 516 in)	Ōsu Kannon Hōshō-in (宝生院), Nagoya, Aichi	—
Huangdi Neijing (黄帝内経, kōteidaikei): Myōdō (明堂) vol. 1 and Taiso (太素)	unknown, member(s) of Tanba family	Annotated editions of the Chinese medical text Huangdi Neijing; transcribed and handed down in the Tanba family	Heian period 1167–1168 (Taiso) and 1296 and 1383 (Myōdō)	Myōdō: Two scrolls; Taiso: 23 scrolls	Ninna-ji, Kyoto	
Wenguan cilin (文館詞林, Bunkan shirin; lit. "Forest of officials' poems and prose") fragments	unknown	Tang dynasty imperial poetry collection; other manuscripts of work had been lost in China as early as 9th century	Tang dynasty, and Heian period, 677–823	Twelve scrolls	Reihōkan (owned by Shōchi-in (正智院)) Kōya, Wakayama	
Wenguan cilin (文館詞林, Bunkan shirin; lit. "Forest of officials' poems and prose") fragments	unknown	Tang dynasty imperial poetry collection; work had been lost in China as early as 9th century	Tang dynasty, Heian period	One scroll	Reihōkan (owned by Hōju-in (宝寿院)) Kōya, Wakayama	—
Yupian (玉篇, gyokuhen) vol. 22	unknown	Part of a 30 volume Chinese character dictionary; one of two extant complete volumes of the work (Note: The other complete volume is number 27 and exists in two halves located at Kōzan-ji and Ishiyama-dera, both designated as national treasures.)	Heian period, 904	One scroll, ink on paper	Ise Shrine Ise, Mie	—
Book of Odes commentary fragment (毛詩鄭箋残巻, mōshi teisen zankan)	unknown	Commentary on the Book of Odes by Zheng Xuan	Heian period	One scroll, ink on paper	Dainenbutsu-ji, Osaka	
Kan'en (翰苑) vol. 30	unknown	Description of people and geography of ancient Japan, the Three Kingdoms of Korea and China; only extant old manuscript of this work	Heian period, 10th century	One scroll, ink on paper, 28 sheets of 22–23 lines each with 16–17 characters per line 27.6 cm × 1,585.2 cm (10.9 in × 624.1 in)	Dazaifu Tenman-gū, Dazaifu, Fukuoka	
Anthology of Tang Dynasty Poems (新撰類林抄, shinsen ruirin-shō) fragment of vol. 4	presumably transcribed by Kūkai	Part of an anthology of Chinese poems by Tang dynasty poets containing 40 poems (282 lines); only extant part of this work	Heian period, 9th century	One scroll, ink on paper, 27.0 cm × 558.0 cm (10.6 in × 219.7 in)	Kyoto National Museum, Kyoto	
New book of the two capitals (両京新記, Ryōkyō shinki; Chin. Liangling xinji) vol. 3, Kanazawa Bunko edition	unknown	Account of the life (Note: At the palace, government offices, monks' quarters, temples and residences) in the capitals Luoyang and Chang'an; other manuscripts of this work had been lost in China; formerly stored at the Kanazawa Bunko library	Kamakura period	One scroll	Maeda Ikutokukai, Tokyo	
Annotated edition of Wen Xuan (文選集注, monsen shicchū)	unknown	Chinese poetry collection	mid Heian period	Seven scrolls, ink on paper	Tōyō Bunko, Tokyo	
Annotated edition of Wen Xuan (文選集注, monsen shicchū)	unknown	Chinese poetry collection	Heian period	19 scrolls, ink on paper	Shōmyō-ji (称名寺), Yokohama, Kanagawa; custody of Kanazawa Bunko	—
Book of politics (群書治要, gunsho chiyō)	various unknown	Summary of good governing skill from various materials; transcription of a Tang dynasty manuscript; oldest extant copies of the text; paper made of sheets dyed in purple, pale blue, and brown, as well as sheets decorated with flying-clouds; with annotations and grammatical notes; handed down in the Kujō family	mid Heian period, 11th century	13 scrolls, ink on colored and decorated paper, 27.0 × (721.2 – 1,472.7) cm (10.6 × (283.9 – 579.8) in)	Tokyo National Museum, Tokyo	
Chōgyokushū (琱玉集), vol. 12 and 14	unknown	Collection of various topics concerning the Six Dynasties	Nara period, 747	Two scrolls, ink on paper, 21 sheets (vol. 12) and 17 sheets (vol. 14), height: 28 cm (11 in), lengths: 1,037 cm (408 in) (vol. 12), 874 cm (344 in) (vol. 14)	Ōsu Kannon Hōshō-in (宝生院), Nagoya, Aichi	—
Newly Revised Pharmacopoeia (新修本草, Shinshū honzō) (Xinxiu bencao), vol. 4, 5, 12, 17, 19	unknown	Transcription of the Tang dynasty, worldwide first pharmacopoeia; also called Tang bencao (Materia Medica of the Tang Dynasty)	Kamakura period, 13th century	Five scrolls, ink on Japanese tissue	Ninna-ji, Kyoto	

=== Song printed editions ===
Printing had been known in Japan from at least the 8th century, when a large number of dharani known as Hyakumantō Darani (Note: There are about 1000 extant, but contemporary sources such as the Shoku Nihongi mention that up to one million dharani were produced.) were printed from 764 to 770 and placed in miniature wooden pagodas. These count among the oldest extant printed texts in East Asia and were likely made by woodblock printing. The Hyakumantō Darani were ritual Buddhist printings, neither meant for distribution nor for reading. This practice of devotional printing continued into the Heian period. The first practical printing in Japan can be dated to the 11th century and is associated with sutra commentaries and doctrinal works for which handcopying did not entail religious merit. Despite the increasing popularity of printing, many texts, particularly Japanese literature, continued to be copied by hand on manuscript scrolls. Commercial printing did not become common until the early 17th century.

Printing in China initially had a similar development, starting with the printing of religious scriptures, prayers and popularly useful texts such as almanacs or calendars which were produced for local use by temples. By the Five Dynasties, the government realized the opportunities of printing political and ideological texts such as the Classics. The ensuing Song dynasty saw great advancements in art, religion and philosophy with scholarly activity greatly facilitated by printed books. Consequently, the Chinese publishing industry took off during the Song dynasty, several hundred years before the same happened in Japan. Enhanced by the Song interest of foreign trade and the maritime activity of the Taira, the book exchange between China and Japan saw a second peak after the Sui and Tang dynasties starting in 1192. Japanese visitors to Song China returned with a large number of printed books, on a variety of subjects such as history, philosophy, Buddhism, Confucianism, literature, medicine and geography, causing a revival of pure scholarship, which had been sidelined during the earlier obsession with poetry in the Heian period courtier society.

The supply of imported printed editions of Chinese texts was insufficient to meet the demand and by the time of the Taira supremacy collections of Chinese books had become status symbols among the upper class of Japan. Books were collected and formed the nuclei of many new libraries, in particular those associated with Zen temples of Kyoto and Kamakura or those founded by samurai families of the Kantō region. These libraries became centers of learning and to a great extent stimulated the varied and energetic scholarly activities of the coming medieval age. The most important of these new libraries in the Kamakura period was the Kanazawa Bunko, established in 1275 by Hōjō Sanetoki. Eclectic in scope, it had a huge collection of books embracing the literary culture of all of East Asia, including a great number of Song editions of Chinese works. The collection was dispersed at the end of the 16th century and partially transferred to Edo by Tokugawa Ieyasu. Librarians of Kanazawa Bunko used an ownership seal, making it possible to trace existing copies back to that library. During the Muromachi period Uesugi Norizane revived in 1432 the Ashikaga Gakko library that came to house a bulk of mainly Confucian texts and exegetical works.

Thirteen sets of Song printed books have been designated as national treasures. Many of them have been handed down in feudal era Japanese clans and were stored at libraries such as Kanazawa Bunko, Ashikaga Gakko or at monasteries such as the one of Tōfuku-ji. They cover mainly Chinese Classics such as books and commentaries on Records of the Grand Historian, the Book of Han, the Book of Later Han, Classic of History, Book of Rites, Book of Songs or the Book of Changes. Two are encyclopedias.

Name	Remarks	Date	Format	Present location	Image
Giso Rokujō, Song edition (宋刊義楚六帖, sōhan giso rokujō)	Encyclopedic account of Buddhism	Southern Song, 1127	12 books bound by fukuro-toji	Tōfuku-ji, Kyoto	—
Compilation of Ouyang Xiu, Song printed edition (宋刊本欧陽文忠公集, sōkanpon ōyō bunchūkōshū) Kanazawa Bunko edition (金沢文庫本, kanazawa bunkobon)	Formerly stored at the Kanazawa Bunko library	Southern Song, 1196	39 books bound by fukuro-toji, 28 cm × 18.5 cm (11.0 in × 7.3 in)	Tenri Central Library, Tenri, Nara	
Records of the Grand Historian collected commentaries, Song printed edition (宋刊本史記集解, sōkanpon shiki shikkai)	—	Southern Song	Eleven books bound by fukuro-toji	Takeda Science Foundation (武田科学振興財団, Takeda Kagaku Shinkōzaidan), Osaka	—
Wen Xuan, Song printed edition (宋刊本文選, sōkanbon monzen) Kanazawa Bunko edition (金沢文庫本, kanazawa bunkobon)	With contributions by Hōjō Ujimasa and Kyūka Zuiyo (九華瑞璵) from 1560; formerly stored at the Kanazawa Bunko library; from June 1560 in possession of Ashikaga Gakko	Southern Song	21 books bound by fukuro-toji, 29.1 cm × 19.1 cm (11.5 in × 7.5 in)	Ashikaga Gakko Remain Library (足利学校遺蹟図書館, Ashikaga Gakkō iseki toshōkan), Ashikaga, Tochigi	—
Book of Han, Song edition (宋版漢書, sōhan kanjo), Qingyuan printed edition (慶元刊本, keigen kanpon)	Handed down in the Kōjōkan (興譲館), an Edo period clan school of the Yonezawa Domain	Southern Song, Keigen era (1195–1200)	61 books bound by fukuro-toji	National Museum of Japanese History, Sakura, Chiba	
Book of the Later Han, Song edition (宋版後漢書, sōhan gokanjo), Qingyuan printed edition (慶元刊本, keigen kanpon)	Chinese historical work, handed down in the Kōjōkan (興譲館), an Edo period clan school of the Yonezawa Domain	Southern Song	60 books bound by fukuro-toji	National Museum of Japanese History, Sakura, Chiba	—
Records of the Grand Historian, Song edition (宋版史記, sōhanshiki) Huang Shanfu printed edition (黄善夫刊本)	Oldest Song edition of this work; formerly in possession of the Kōjōkan (興譲館), an Edo period clan school of the Yonezawa Domain	Southern Song	90 books bound by fukuro-toji	National Museum of Japanese History, Sakura, Chiba	—
Detailed Commentary to the Changes of Zhou (Zhou Yi), Song edition (宋版周易注疏, Sōban Shūeki Chūso)	Postscript near the end of each volume indicating the year (1234–1236)	Southern Song, 1234–1236	13 books bound by fukuro-toji, ink on paper, 27.0 cm × 19.1 cm (10.6 in × 7.5 in)	Ashikaga Gakko Remain Library (足利学校遺蹟図書館, Ashikaga Gakkō iseki toshōkan), Ashikaga, Tochigi	—
Commentary on the Book of History, Song edition (宋版尚書正義, sōban shōshoseigi)	Each page has 8 lines with 16–21 characters per line with annotation lines consisting of two rows instead of one	Southern Song	8 books bound by fukuro-toji, ink on paper, 28.3 cm × 18.2 cm (11.1 in × 7.2 in)	Ashikaga Gakko Remain Library (足利学校遺蹟図書館, Ashikaga Gakkō iseki toshōkan), Ashikaga, Tochigi	
Commentary on the Book of Rites, Song edition (宋版礼記正義, sōban raikiseigi)	With red seals and text in India ink indicating the hereditary in the Ashikaga Gakko Library	Southern Song	2 books bound by fukuro-toji, ink on paper, 26 cm × 18.7 cm (10.2 in × 7.4 in)	Ashikaga Gakko Remain Library (足利学校遺蹟図書館, Ashikaga Gakkō iseki toshōkan), Ashikaga, Tochigi	
Imperial Readings of the Taiping Era, Song edition (宋版太平御覧, sōban taiheigyoran)	Massive encyclopedia, part of the Four Great Books of Song	Southern Song, 1199	103 books bound by fukuro-toji, ink on paper	Tōfuku-ji, Kyoto	
Commentary on the Book of Songs, Song edition (宋版毛詩正義, sōban mōshiseigi), Kanazawa Bunko edition (金沢文庫本, kanazawa bunkobon)	Formerly stored at the Kanazawa Bunko library	Southern Song, 1139	17 books bound by fukuro-toji, ink on paper	Takeda Science Foundation (武田科学振興財団, Takeda Kagaku Shinkōzaidan), Osaka	—
Anthology of Liu Mengde, Song edition (宋版劉夢得文集, sōhan ryūbōtoku bunshū)	Anthology by Liu Yuxi	Southern Song	12 bound books by fukuro-toji, ink on paper	Tenri Central Library, Tenri, Nara	

== See also ==
- Nara Research Institute for Cultural Properties
- Tokyo Research Institute for Cultural Properties
- Independent Administrative Institution National Museum
