= Shōchō uprising =

Military conflict

The Shōchō uprising (正長の土一揆, Shōchō no Do Ikki) or Shōchō no Tsuchi Ikki) was one of the many armed rebellions in Japan during the Muromachi Period and the first launched by the peasants. It occurred between August and September of the year 1428, which in the old Japanese calendar was the 1st year of Shōchō, and is also known as the Shōchō no Tokusei Ikki, the "Shōchō debt cancellation revolt".

== Overview ==
During the latter half of the Ōei period (1394-1428), in 1420 and 1428, extreme weather conditions caused severe famines. Social anxiety increased as a result of the death of Shogun Ashikaga Yoshimochi and the death of Emperor Shoko and of an epidemic of three-day disease (likely cholera). The price of agricultural products such as rice had risen, and many people had to borrow money by pawning. In addition, special taxes were imposed by the manor lords and shugo (military governors), to make up for the huge expenses incurred by temples and shrines for the ceremonies necessary to install the new shogun and new emperor. The first to revolt were the bashaku of Ōtsu and Sakamoto in Ōmi Province, who demanded a debt moratorium.

This revolt spread and extended to all of the Kinai region as peasants throughout the region who were struggling to repay their debts undertook "independent debt relief" by attacking and looting sake merchants, storehouse money brokers, and Buddhist temples. The grounds for the so-called "independent debt relief" is supposed to be "daigawari no tokusei", or debt relief at the time when power passes from one shōgun to another. The Muromachi shogunate was hard-pressed by this and set about quelling it under the orders of the Kanrei Hatakeyama Mitsuie. The head of the samurai-dokoro, Akamatsu Mitsusuke, also sent troops. However, the strength of the insurrection did not diminish but rather rebels even invaded Kyoto in September, with the rebels occupying the great temple of Tō-ji In November. The revolts subsequently spread to Yamato, Kawachi and Harima Provinces.

The monk Jinson recorded the following entry about the uprising in the Daijoin nikki mokuroku, his daily journal. "The first year of Shōchō, in the ninth month, an uprising of commoners broke out. They claimed debt relief and went on to destroy wine shops, pawn shops, and temples which engaged in usury. They took anything they could lay their hands on, and cancelled the debts. Kanrei Hatakeyama Mitsuie suppressed this. There is nothing more than this incident to bring about the ruin of our country. This is the first time since the founding of Japan that an uprising of commoners ever occurred."

On November 2, rebel forces invaded Nara, with a major clash against the sōhei of the Nara temples occurring near Futai-ji. On the 25th, Kofuku-ji, fearing that the rebels would invade from the south, issued a seven-article Tokusei Law, which stipulated that pawnbrokers could be redeemed for one-third of their original value, and that loan agreements older than five years should be annulled. The famous Yagyū Tokusei Inscription is believed to have been carved in response.

In the end, the Muromachi shogunate did not release a debt cancellation order, but because proof of the farmers' debts had been destroyed during the looting, the "independent debt relief" had effectively achieved the same situation. Furthermore, Kōfuku-ji in Yamato Province formally cancelled debts and because it had turned almost all the territory in the province into its own shōen and exercised power as its shugo, these orders had official binding power and were implemented. An example of one such order is the Yagyū no Tokusei Hibun which was inscribed on a stone monument.

== Yagyū no Tokusei Hibun ==
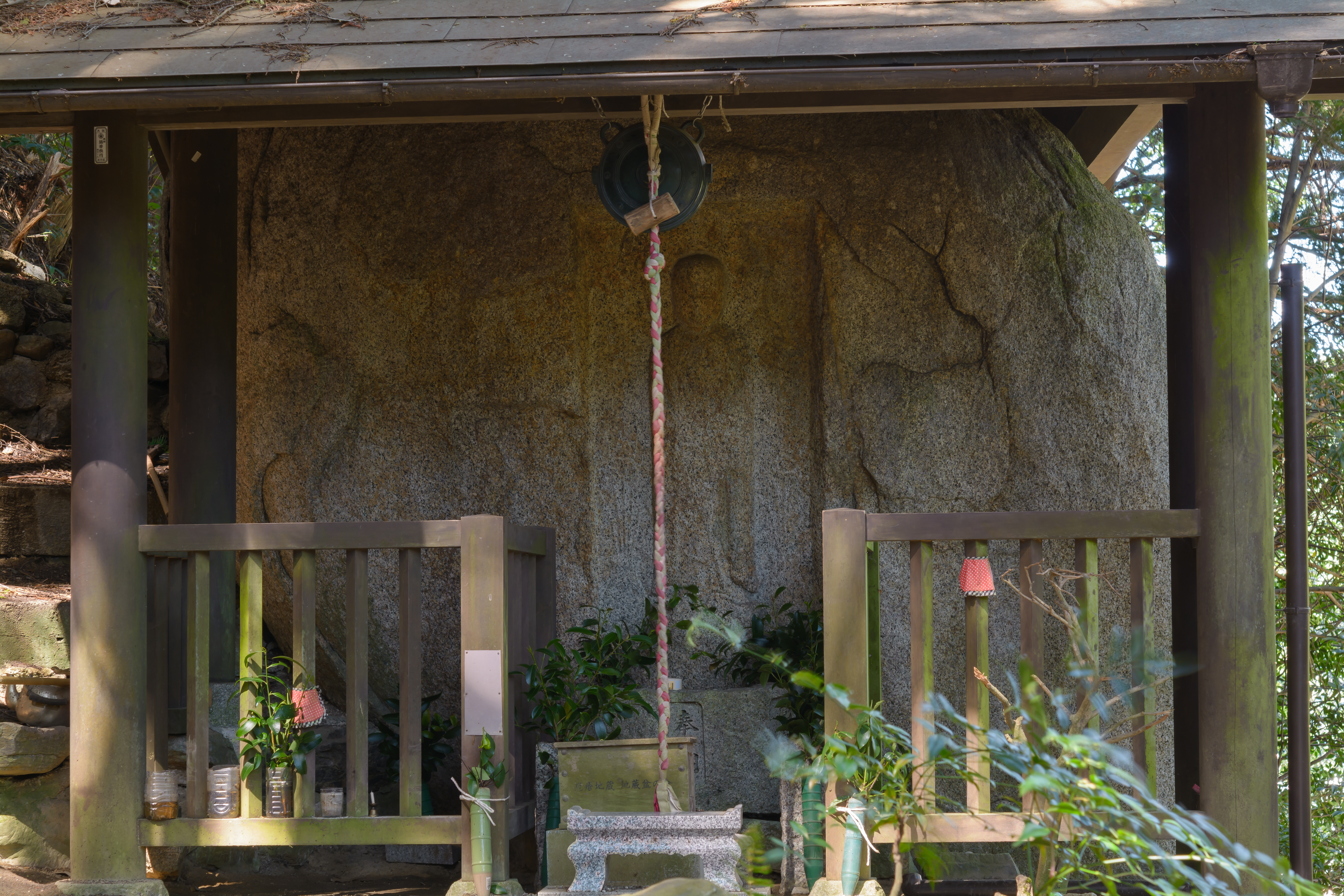
Yagyū no Tokusei Hibun

The Yagyū no Tokusei Hibun (柳生徳政碑) is a stone monument is located in the Yagyū neighborhood of the city of Nara, Nara Prefecture, on a cliff across the river from the temple of Hōtoku-ji and facing the Yagyū kaidō. It is a granite rock measuring 3 meters in height, 3.3 meters in width, and 4 meters in depth. In the center of the south side of the stone is a 1.1 meter bas-relief standing Jizō Bosatsu, commonly known as "Hōsō Jizō," (i.e. "smallpox Jizō, as it was believed that prayers to this image could prevent or cure the disease). It is inscribed with the date "November, the first year of the Gen'o era" (which corresponds to the year 1319). Below this image in the lower right part of the boulderis a rectangular frame measuring 36 by 10.5 centimeters. It contains a 3 1/2 line 27 character inscription: "From the first year of Shōchō, Sakisha Kan e Shikan Kauni wo Imearu Hekarasu." This can be interpreted as a description of the Tokuseirei, which states that "all debts in the four Kobe villages prior to the first year of Shōchō are wiped out." The "four Kobe villages" refers to the four shōen landed estates of Oyanagiyu-shō, Koyanagiyu-shō, Sakahara-shō, and Ochi-shō. It is believed to have been carved by a local headman as a commemoration of the debt cancellation order as a result of Shōchō peasant uprising in 1428 (the first year of the Shōchō era).

In March 1953, the monument was designated a Cultural Property of Nara Prefecture, and the following year, in 1954, it was included in official history textbooks for third-year high school students. It was then designated a National Historic Site in 1983. The inscription has worn away from years of weathering, and it is difficult to make out anything except the character "chō" with the naked eye. Originally it was an open-air area, but in 1998 a roof and wooden enclosure were built for its protection.
