= Yūrinkan Museum =

Mosque in Kyoto, Japan

- 藤井斉成会有鄰館
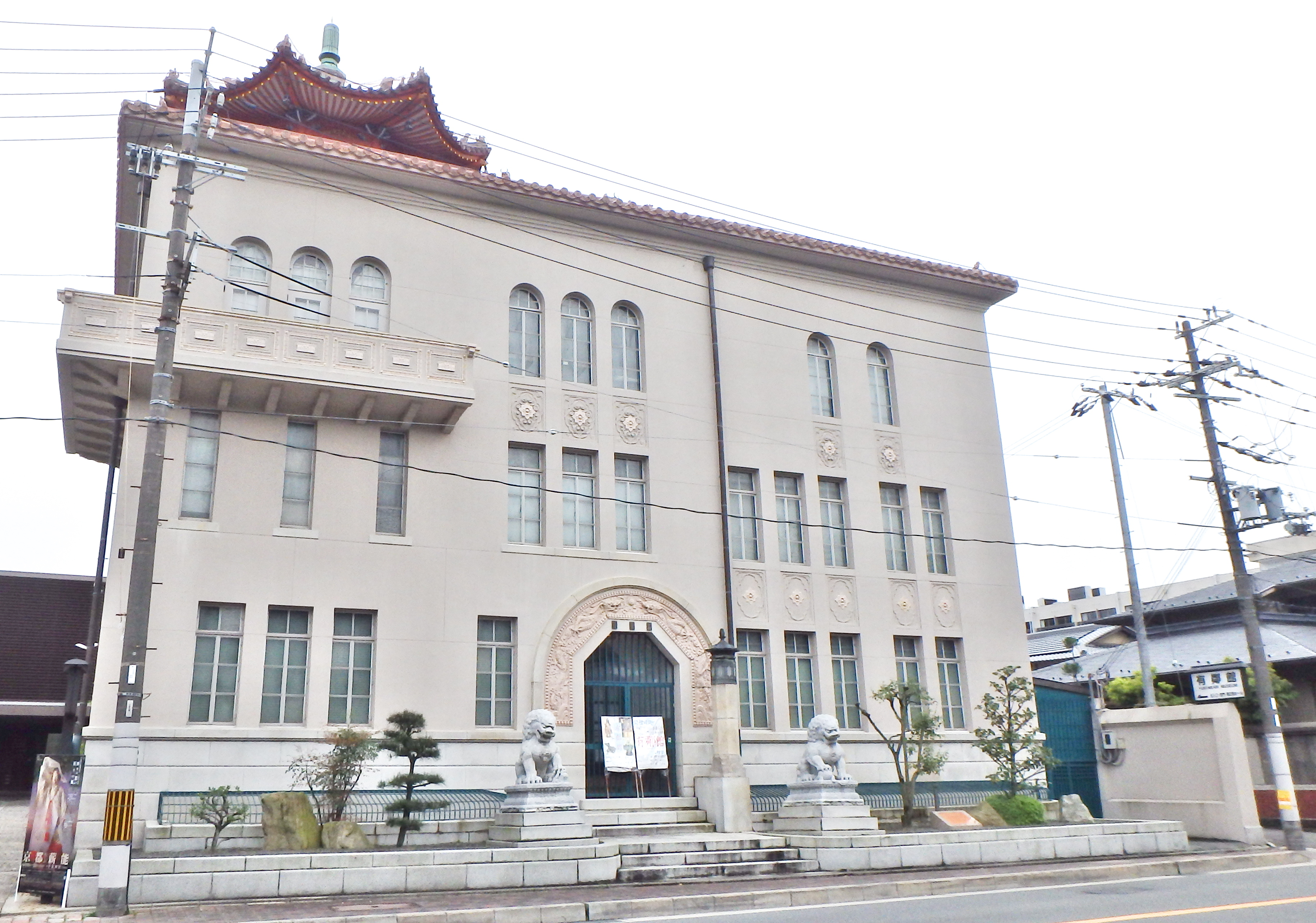
- Interactive map of the Yūrinkan Museum area

General information
- Location: 44 Okazaki Enshōji-chō, Sakyō-ku, Kyoto, Kyoto Prefecture, Japan
- Coordinates: 35°00′42″N 135°46′53″E
- Opened: 1926

Design and construction
- Architect: Takeda Goichi

Website
- Official website

The Yūrinkan Museum (有鄰館) or Fujii Saiseikai Yūrinkan (藤井斉成会有鄰館) is a private museum of East Asian art in Kyōto, Japan. Established in 1926 by entrepreneur and politician Fujii Zensuke (1860–1934), it is the second oldest private museum in Japan, after the Ōkura Shūkokan. The collection, particularly strong in Chinese art from the Shang to the Qing, includes one National Treasure and nine Important Cultural Properties.

== Name ==
The museum's name is taken from the Analects of Confucius and "expresses this feeling of good neighbourly relations".

== Collection ==
The Yūrinkan's collection of Chinese art includes bronzes, ceramics, Buddhist statues, seals, calligraphic works, textiles, and paintings, as well as nearly a hundred manuscripts from Dunhuang, including twenty-three in Uighur and others in Tibetan, Mongolian, and Sanskrit. The museum's National Treasure consists of a fragmentary Tang manuscript of a commentary on the Spring and Autumn Annals.

== Buildings ==
The main building or "Fujii Saiseikai Yūrinkan Building No.1" of 1926 was built to a design by Takeda Goichi (武田五一) to house Fujii Kensuke's (藤井善助) collection of Chinese art. In a Chinese style both inside and out, it is topped by an octagonal pavilion with thirty-six thousand yellow glazed roof tiles dating to the time of the Qianlong Emperor. The building is a registered (as opposed to designated) Municipal Tangible Cultural Property.

The annex or "Fujii Saiseikai Yūrinkan Building No.2" dates to the beginning of the Taishō era (1912–1926). Formerly the western-style building of the Yokoyama Mining Office (横山鉱業部), it was relocated from Kanazawa to Kyōto at the time of the enthronement of the Shōwa Emperor in 1928, to accommodate the Minister of Finance. It is registered as a National Tangible Cultural Property, alongside the 1928 storage facility.

== Access ==
The museum is open to the public on the first and third Sunday of each month, excepting January and August.

== See also ==
- List of National Treasures of Japan (writings: Chinese books)
- Kyoto National Museum
- Hosomi Museum
- Heian Jingū
