= Ishiyama-dera =

Buddhist temple in Ōtsu, Shiga, Japan

- 石山寺
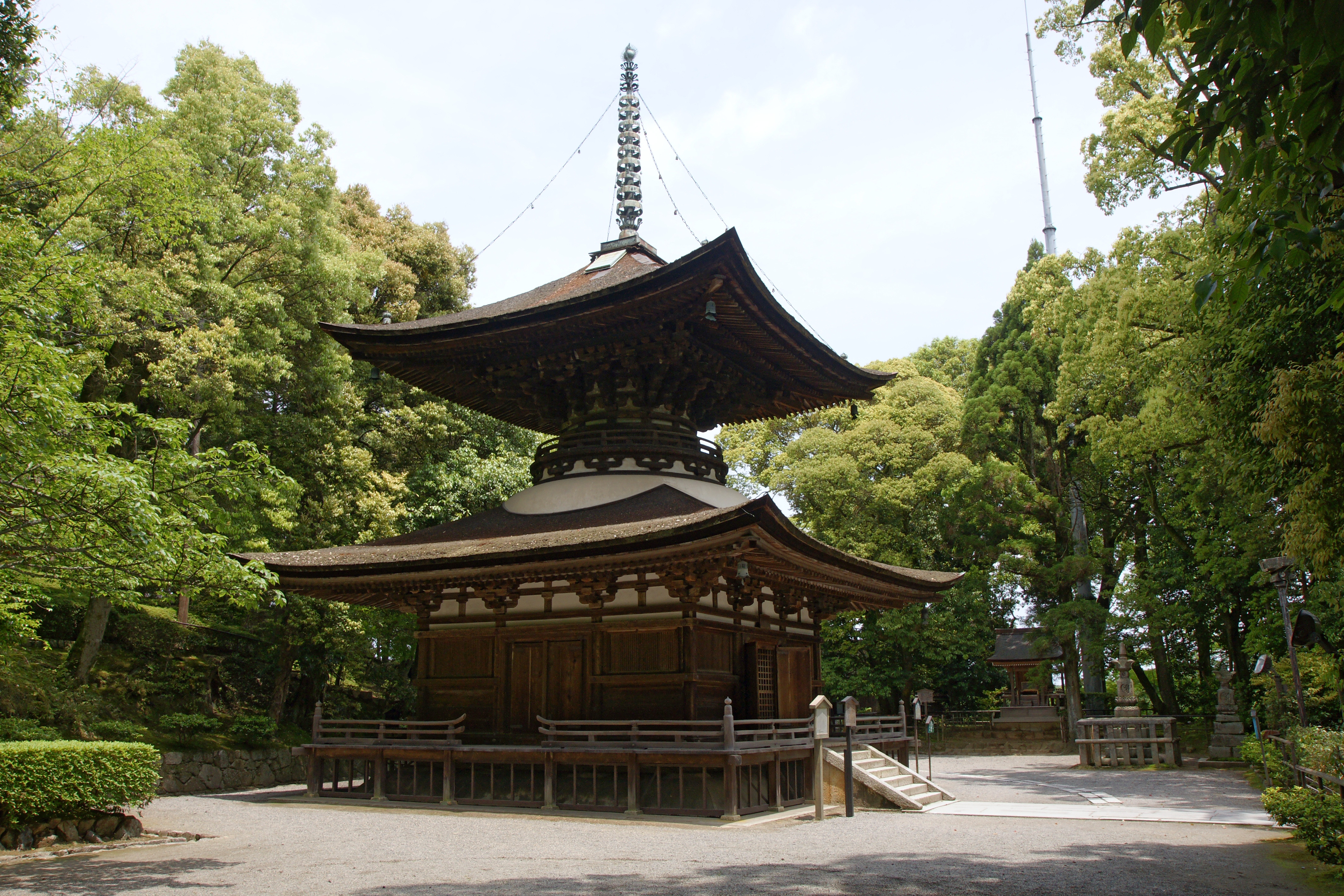
- Ishiyama-dera Tahōtō (NT)

- Location within Shiga Prefecture Location within Japan

Religion
- Affiliation: Buddhist
- Deity: Nyōirin Kannon
- Rite: Shingon-shu Tōji-ha
- Status: functional

Location
- Location: 1-1-1 Ishiyamadera, Ōtsu-shi, Shiga-ken 529-0861
- Interactive map of Ishiyama-dera
- Coordinates: 34°57′37.51″N 135°54′20.25″E

Architecture
- Founder: Rōben
- Completed: c.747

Website
- www.ishiyamadera.or.jp
- National Treasure National Important Cultural Property

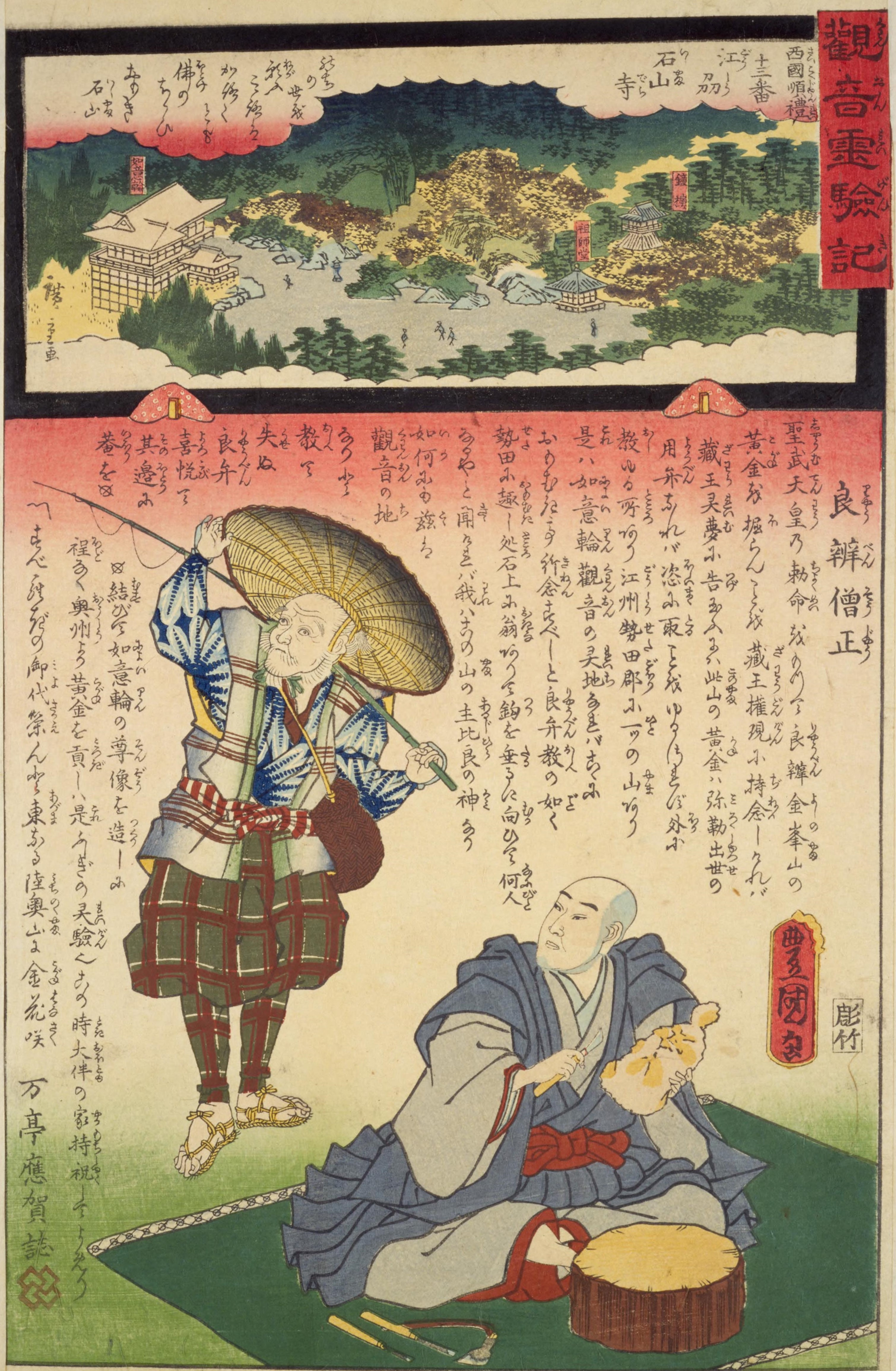
from the picture album "Kannon Reigen ki"

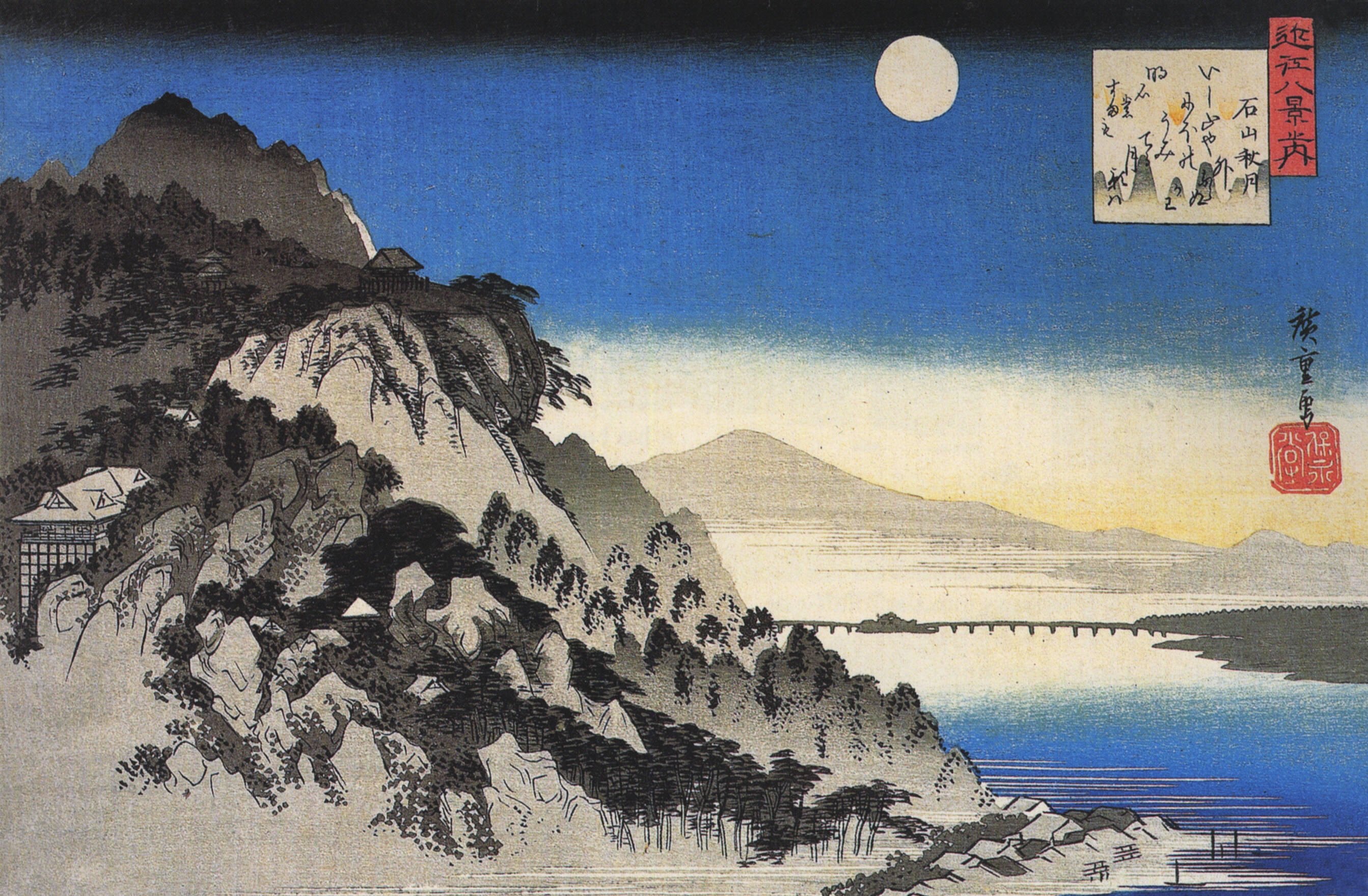
The autumn moon at Ishiyama (石山の秋月), by Hiroshige

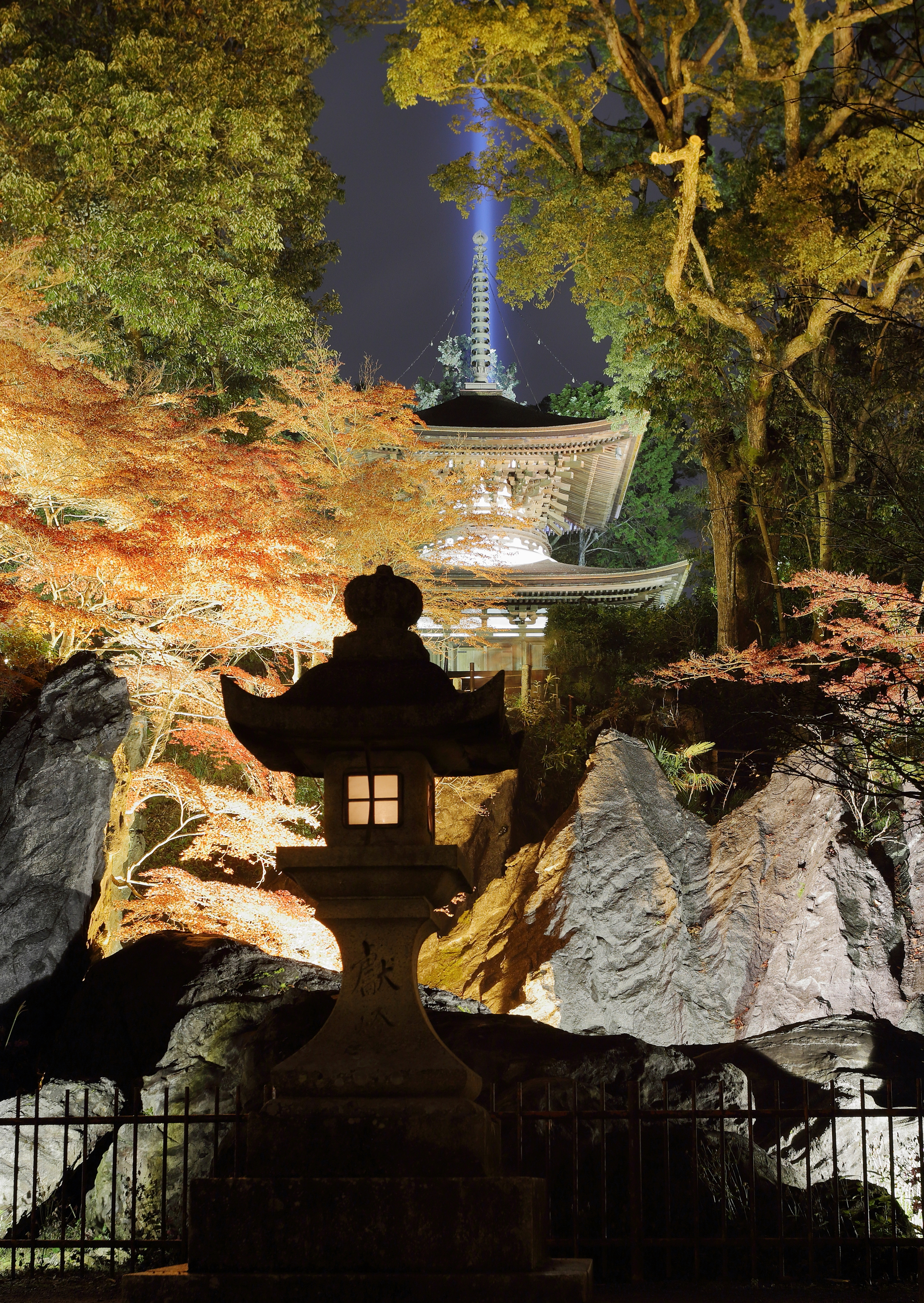
At night during Koyo

Ishiyama-dera (石山寺) is a Buddhist temple located in the Ishiyamadera neighborhood of the city of Ōtsu, Shiga Prefecture, Japan. It belongs to the Shingon-shu Tōji-ha sect of Japanese Buddhism and its honzon is a hibutsu image of Nyōirin Kannon. The temple's full name is Ishiko-san Ishiyama-dera (石光山 石山寺).The temple is the 13th stop on the Saigoku Kannon Pilgrimage route.

== History ==
Prior to the founding of Ishiyama-dera, this area was a quarry in the 660s during the reign of Emperor Tenji. Furthermore, after the Jinshin War in 672, Prince Ōtomo was buried on the east side of the current site of the pagoda. According to the "Ishiyama-dera Engi Emaki", at the request of Emperor Shōmu, Rōben (the founder and chief priest of Tōdai-ji) enshrined a Nyōirin Kannon statue, which was Prince Shōtoku's personal Buddha, here in 747. For the construction of the Great Buddha of Tōdai-ji, Emperor Shōmu needed a large amount of gold to gild the statue's surface. He ordered Rōben to pray to Mount Kinpu in Yoshino for gold. As its name suggests, Mount Kinpu was believed to be a "mountain of gold." One day, Rōben had a dream in which Zaō Gongen of Yoshino appeared to him and told him, "The gold of Mount Kinpu will be used to cover the earth in gold when Miroku Bosatsu appears in this world (5.67 billion years from now) (so it cannot be used to gild the Great Buddha). South of the lake in Shiga County, Ōmi Province, is the land where Kannon Bodhisattva appears. Go there and pray." Following his dream, Rōben visited Ishiyama. Guided by an old man who was an incarnation of Hira Myōjin (also known as Shirahige Myōjin), he placed the six-inch gilt bronze statue of Nyōirin Kannon, Prince Shōtoku's personal Buddha, on a huge rock and built a hut. Two years later, gold was discovered in Mutsu Province, and the era name was changed to Tenpyō-shōhō. Although the miraculous power of Rōben's rituals was thus proven, for some reason the Nyōirin Kannon statue became stuck on the rock. Consequently, a hall was constructed to cover the statue, marking the beginning of the temple. According to documents from the Shōsōin Repository, this Ishiyama site was originally a storage area for timber harvested from various locations, including Kōka and Takashima counties in Ōmi Province, in order to build Tōdai-ji. This legend also appears in other sources include the Genkō Shakusho and the later Shirahige Daimyōjin Engi Emaki (Illustrated Scroll of the Origins of Shirahige Daimyōjin) from 1705.

According to the Shōsōin documents, beginning in 761, the Ishiyama-dera expanded, with staff, including Buddhist sculptors, dispatched from Tōdai-ji and construction of the temple was carried out as a national project and the Hora Palace of Emperor Junnin and Empress Kōken, was located nearby. A new principal image, a clay statue of Nyōirin Kannon was completed between 761 and 762, and the original image was placed inside. The temple's history through the Heian period is unclear, but the temple changed from the Kegon sect to Shingon and became more closely affiliated with Daigo-ji rather than Tōdai-ji. Jun'yu Naigu (890 - 953), the third abbot and grandson of Sugawara no Michizane had a physical disability prevented him from sitting in the proper sitting position, so he devoted himself to his studies and left behind a voluminous body of writing. Many of his handwritten manuscripts remain at the temple, and are collectively designated as a National Treasure (NT). Around this time, pilgrimages to Ishiyama became popular among court ladies, and are described in the works "Kagerō Nikki" and "Sarashina Nikki." Allegedly, Murasaki Shikibu began writing The Tale of Genji at Ishiyama-dera during a full moon night in August 1004. In commemoration, the temple maintains a Genji room featuring a life-size figure of Lady Murasaki and displays a statue in her honor.

On 2 January 1078, the Main Hall was partially burned down by lightning, damaging the clay statue of Nyōirin Kannon. In 1096, the present main hall (NT) was rebuilt, and a new seated Nyōirin Kannon statue (an Important Cultural Property (ICP)) was enshrined. The East Gate, Tahōtō Pagoda, and Shōnan-in Bishamon-dō Hall are weren built in the early Kamakura period with donations from Minamoto no Yoritomo. In February 1573, during the Sengoku period, the temple sided with Ashikaga Yoshiaki, the 15th shōgun of the Muromachi shogunate, and rebelled against Oda Nobunaga. Several buildings at Ishiyama-dera were damaged during the subsequent battle and Nobunaga confiscated much of the temple's estates. After Nobunaga's death, Toyotomi Hideyoshi returned some of the land to the temple in 1596. In 1613, Tokugawa Ieyasu granted the temple 579 koku of estates for its upkeep. During the Keichō era (1596–1615), Yodo-dono restored the temple. Ishiyama-dera was spared the fires that burned the surrounding mountain, and as a result, many valuable cultural assets, including buildings, Buddhist statues, scriptures, and documents, have been preserved.

The temple features as "The Autumn Moon at Ishiyama" (石山の秋月 Ishiyama no Shūgetsu) in the Eight Views of Ōmi thematic series in art and literature; examples include ukiyo-e prints by Suzuki Harunobu in the 18th century and Hiroshige in the 19th century.

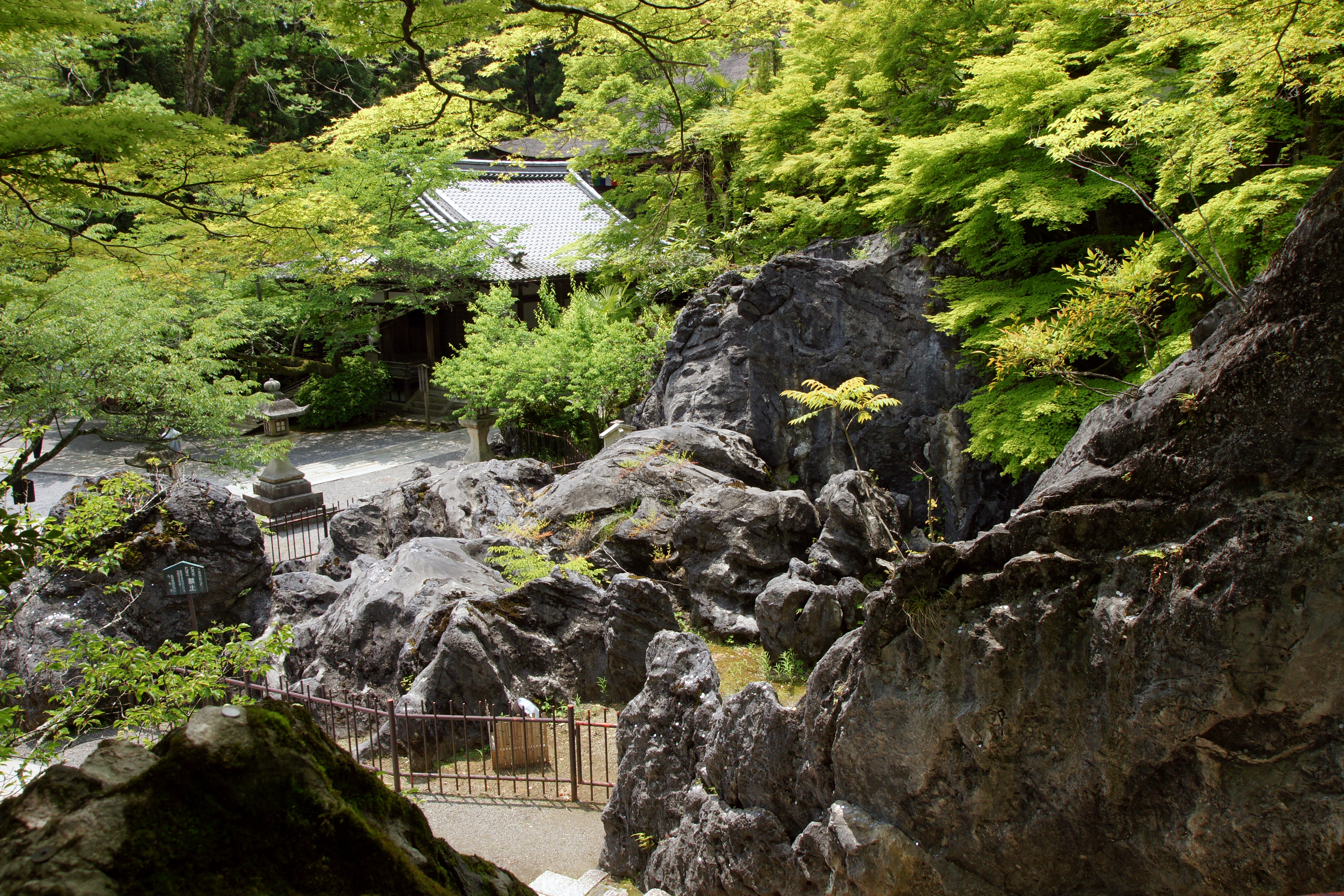
Ishiyama-dera Wollastonite

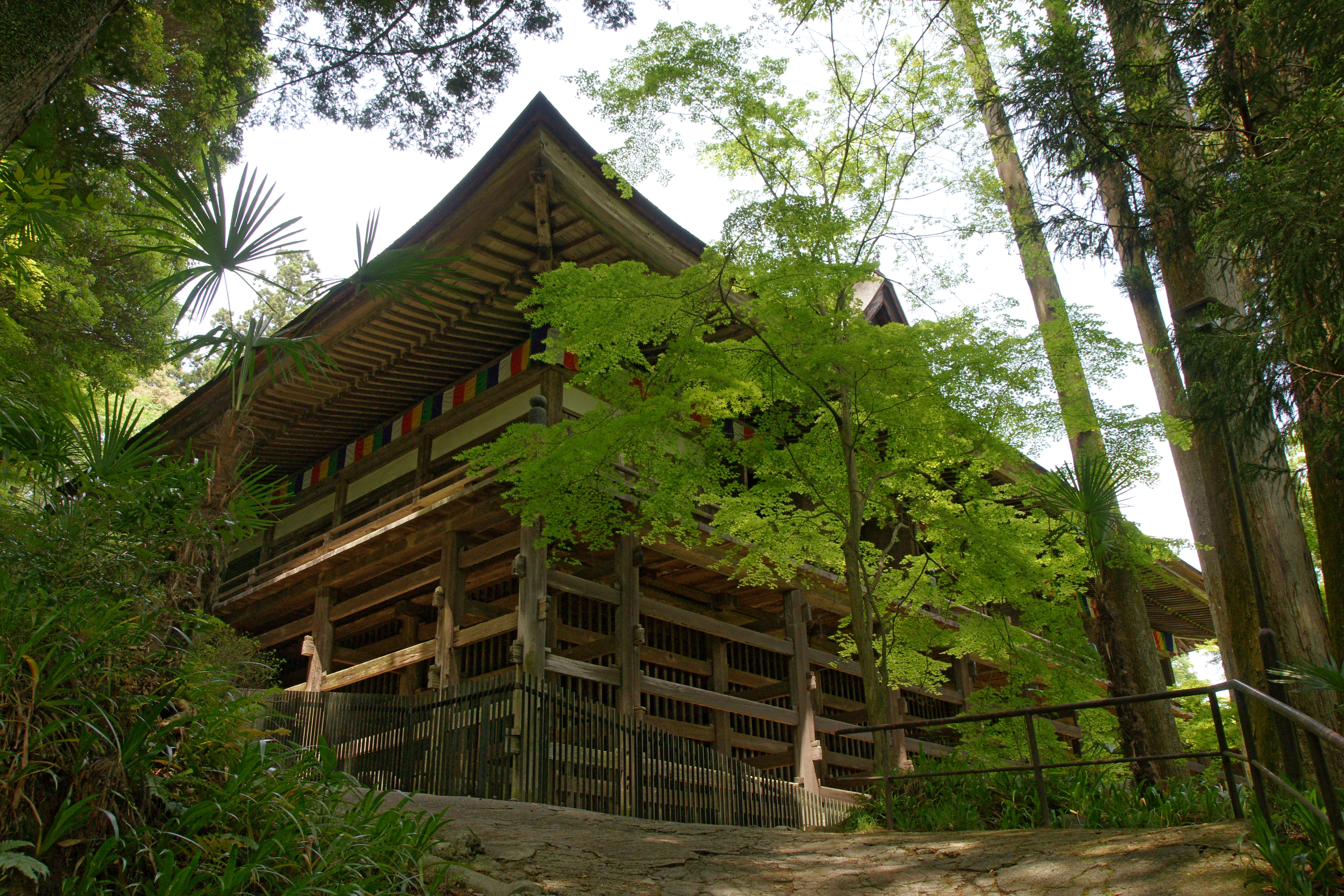
Hondō (NT)

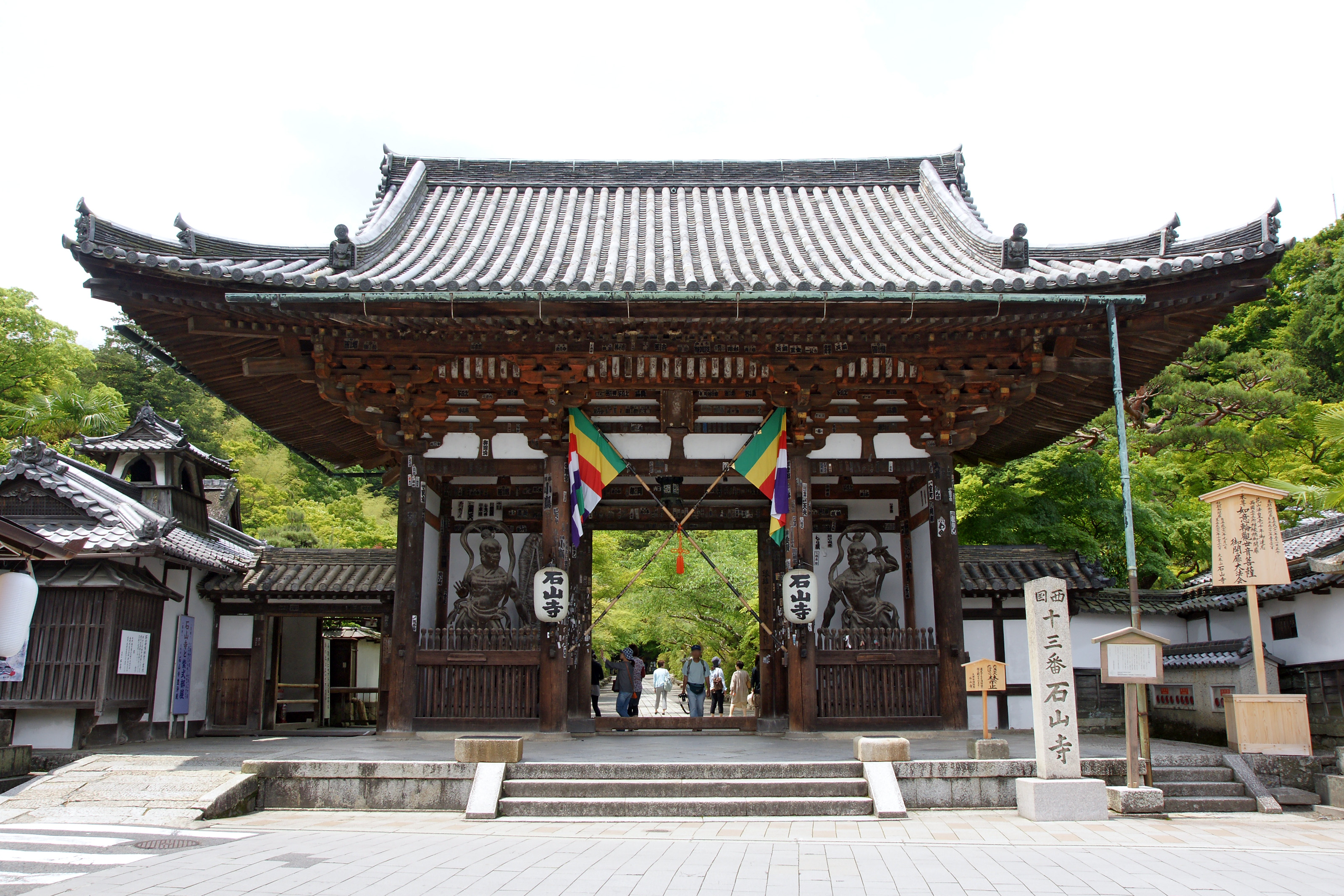
East Gate

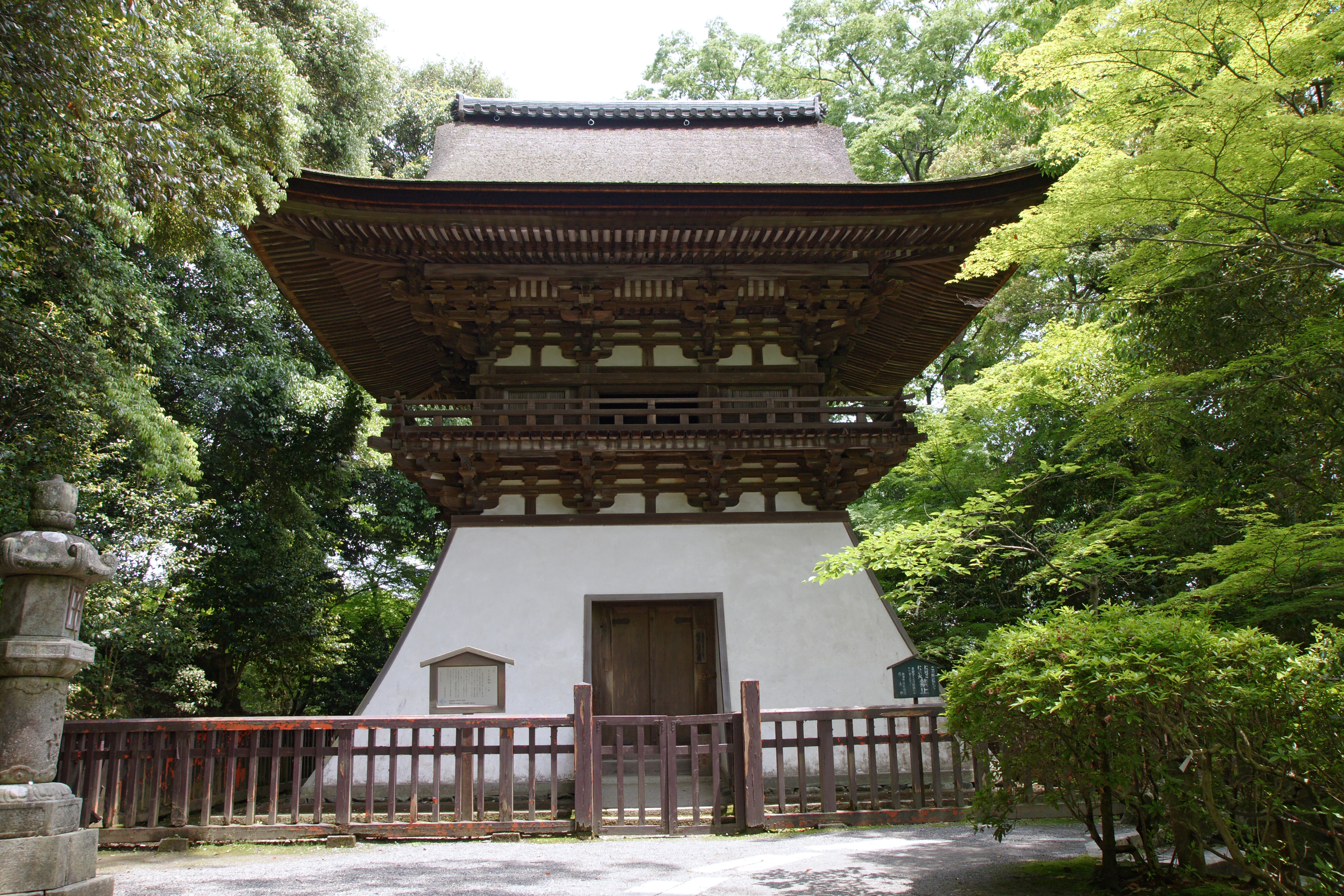
Shōrō

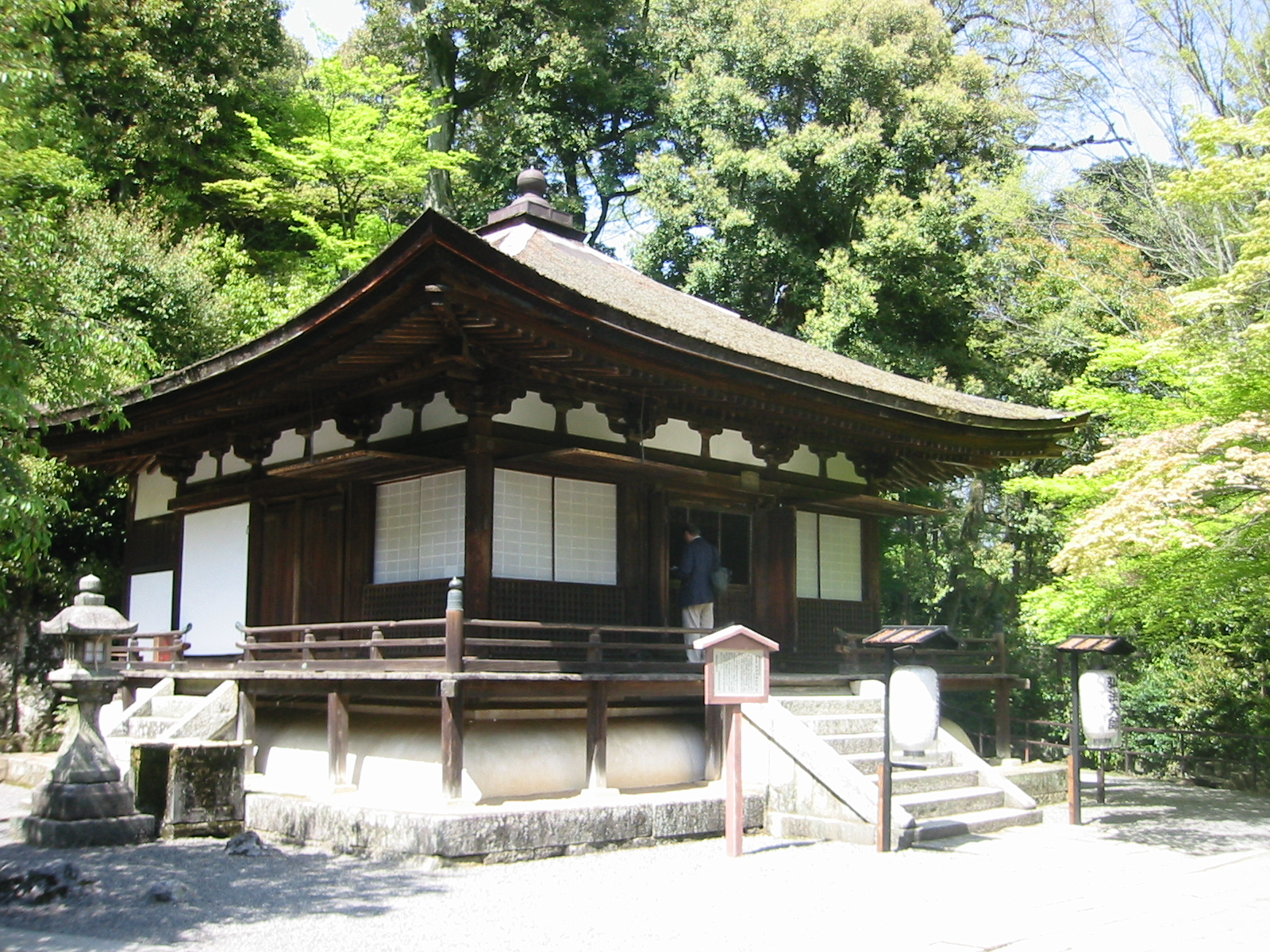
Mikage-dō（Kaizan-dō）

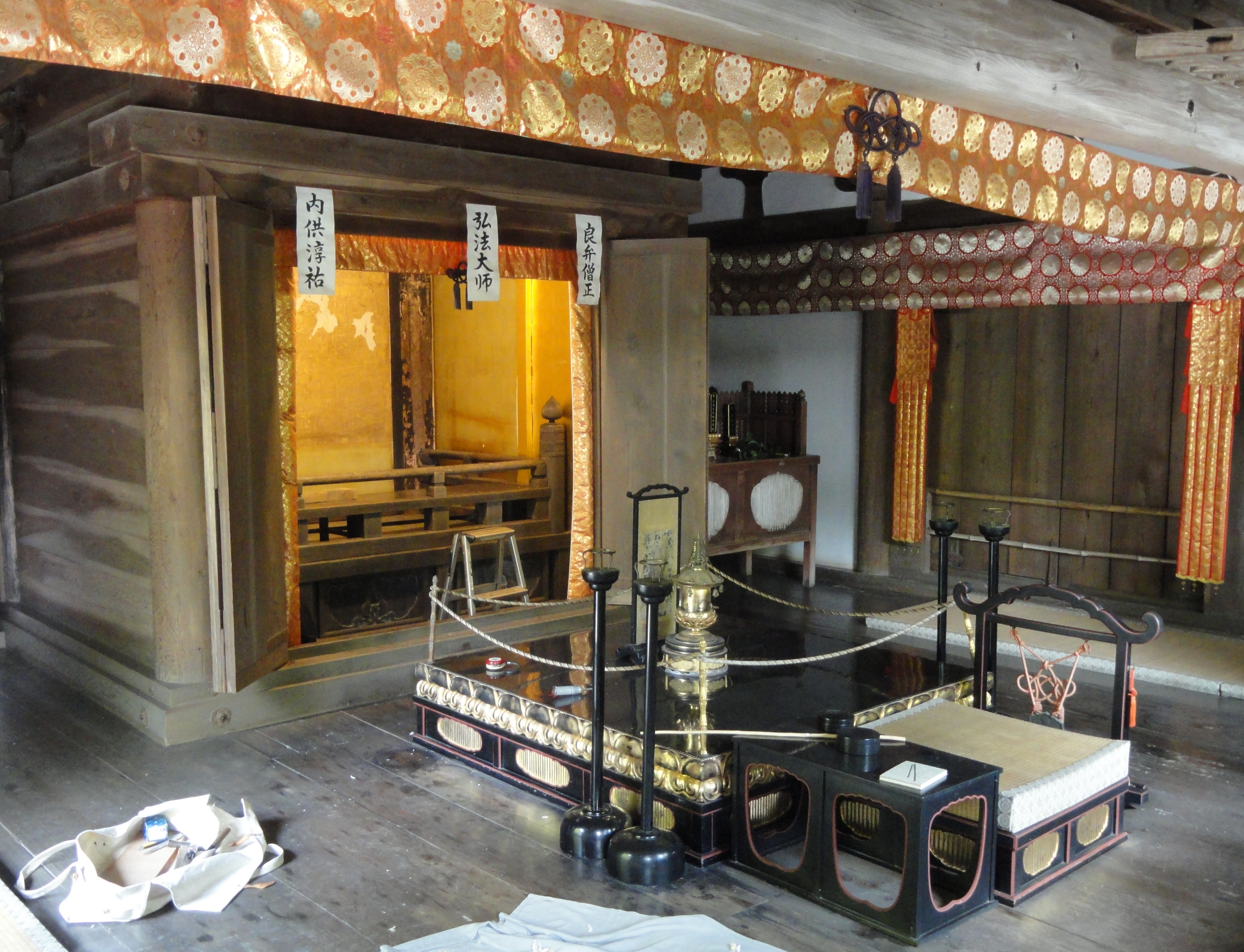
Interior of Mikage-dō

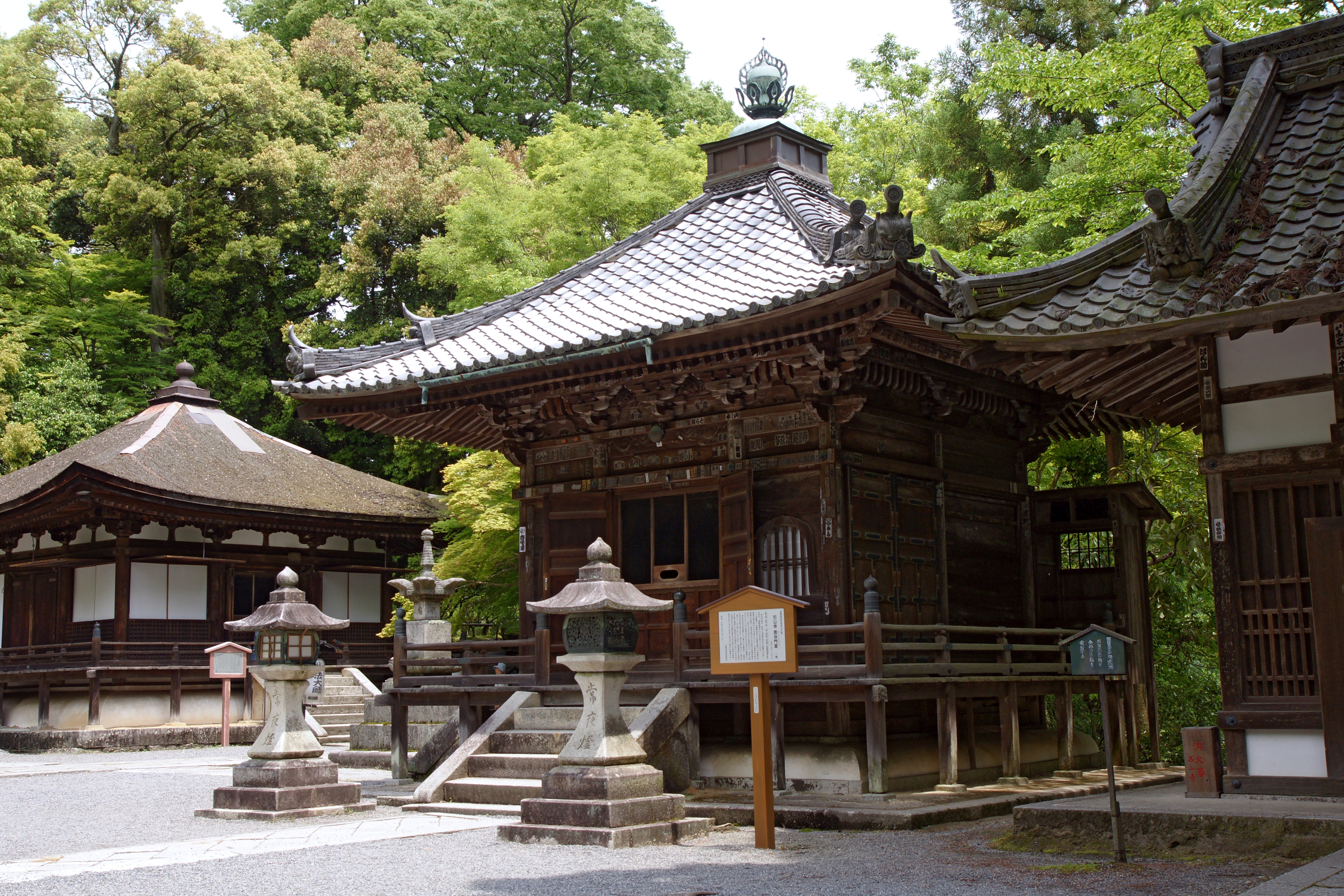
Bishamon-dō

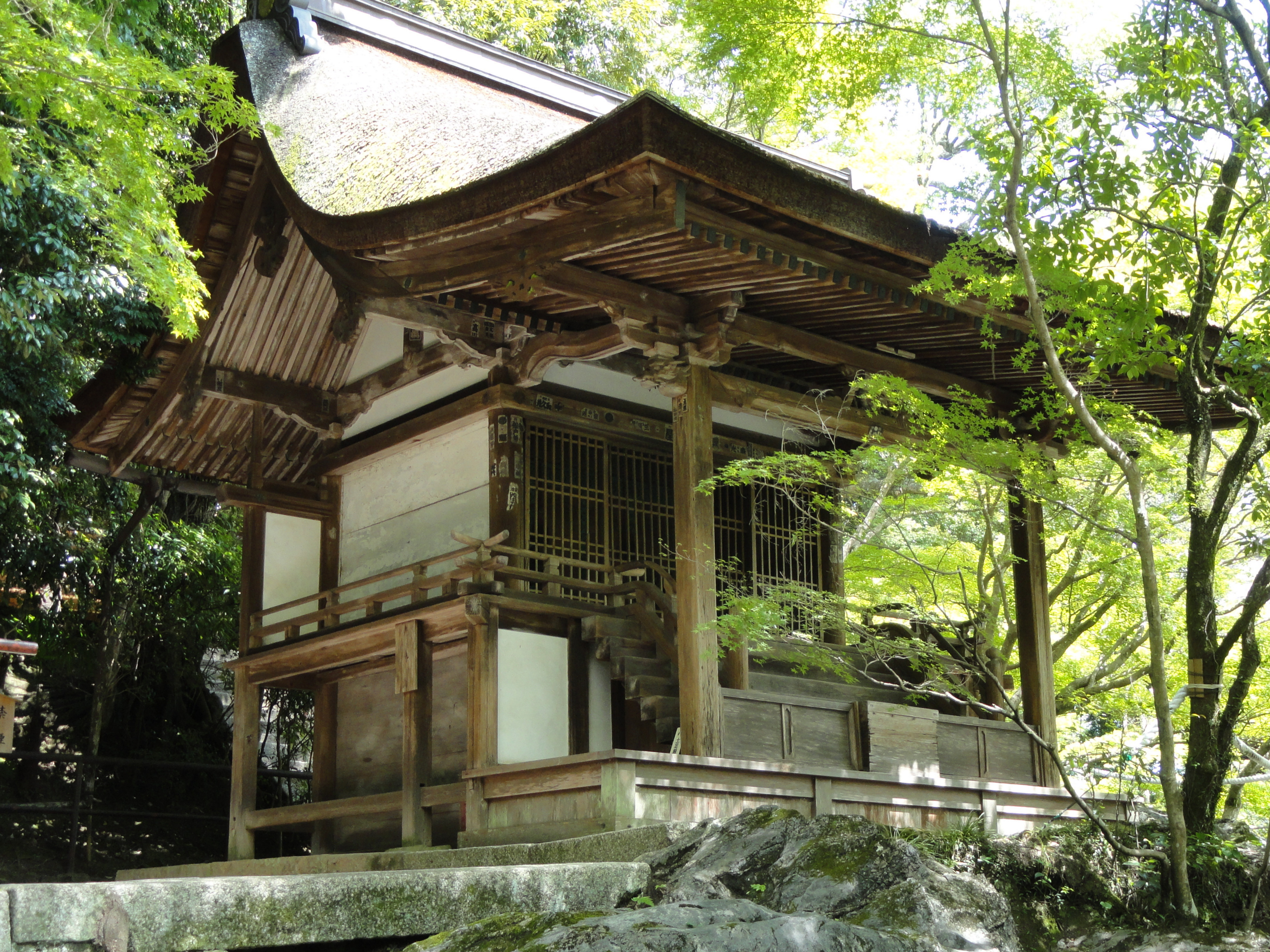
Sanju-hachi Gongen Honden

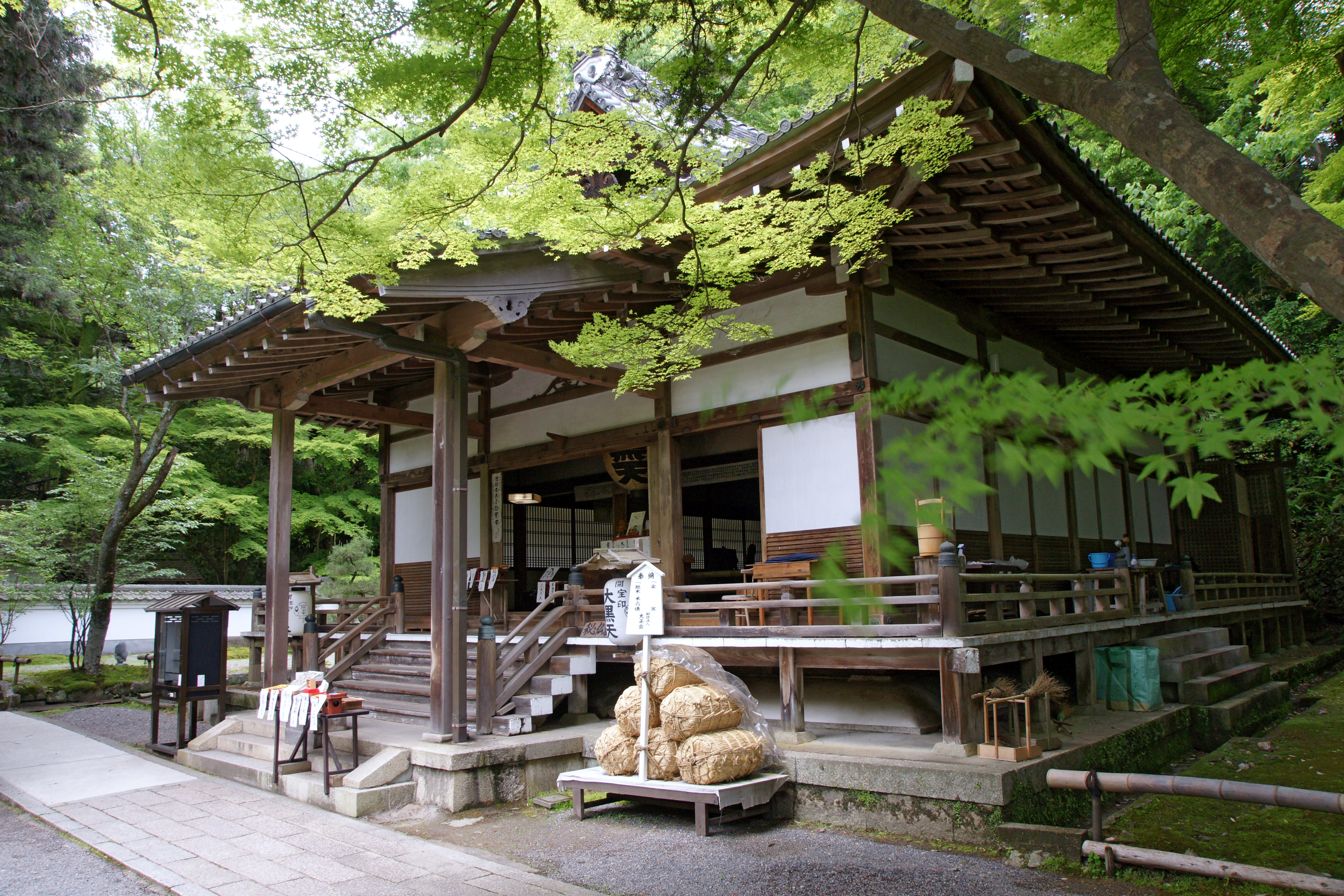
Daikokuten-dō

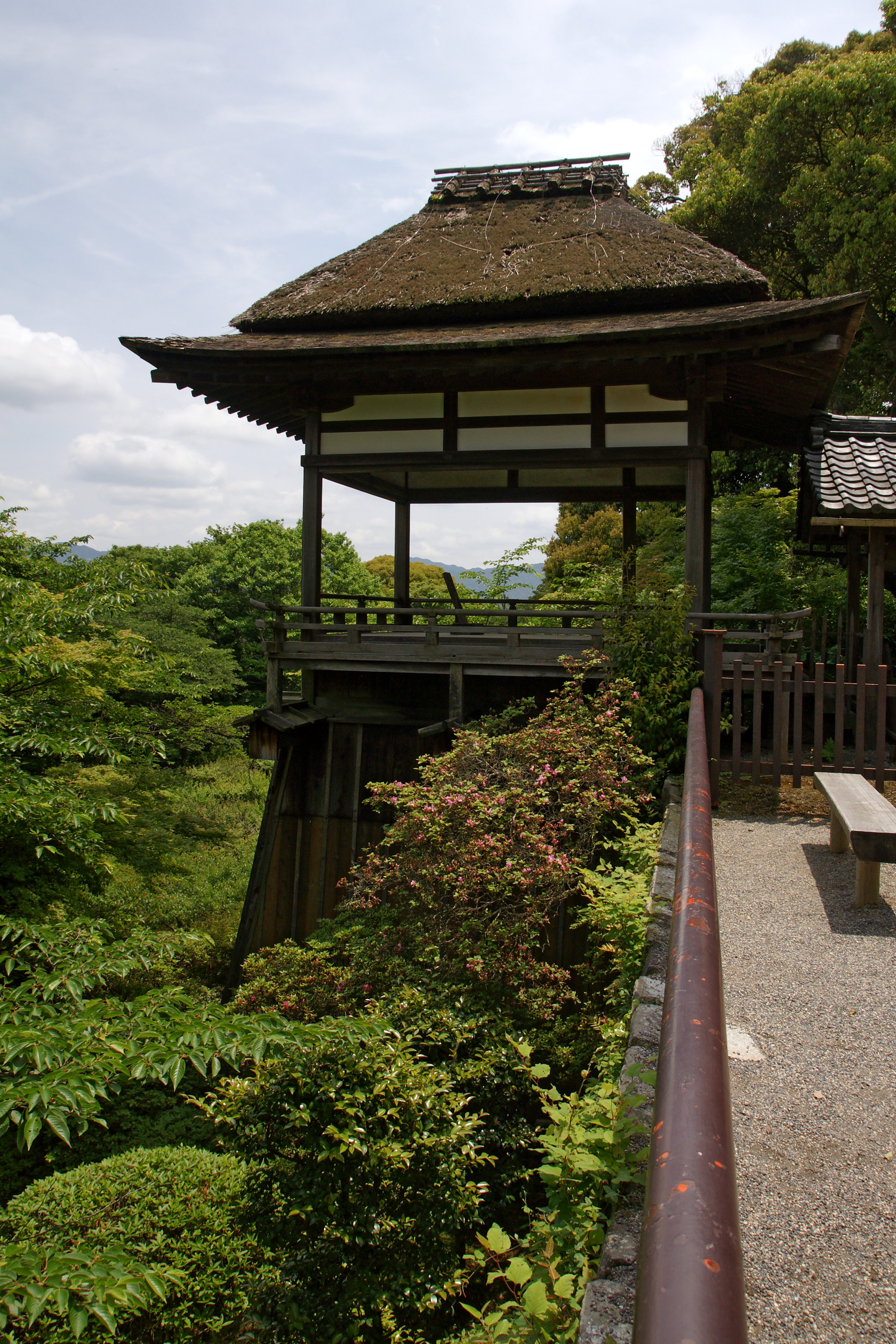
Tsukimi-tei

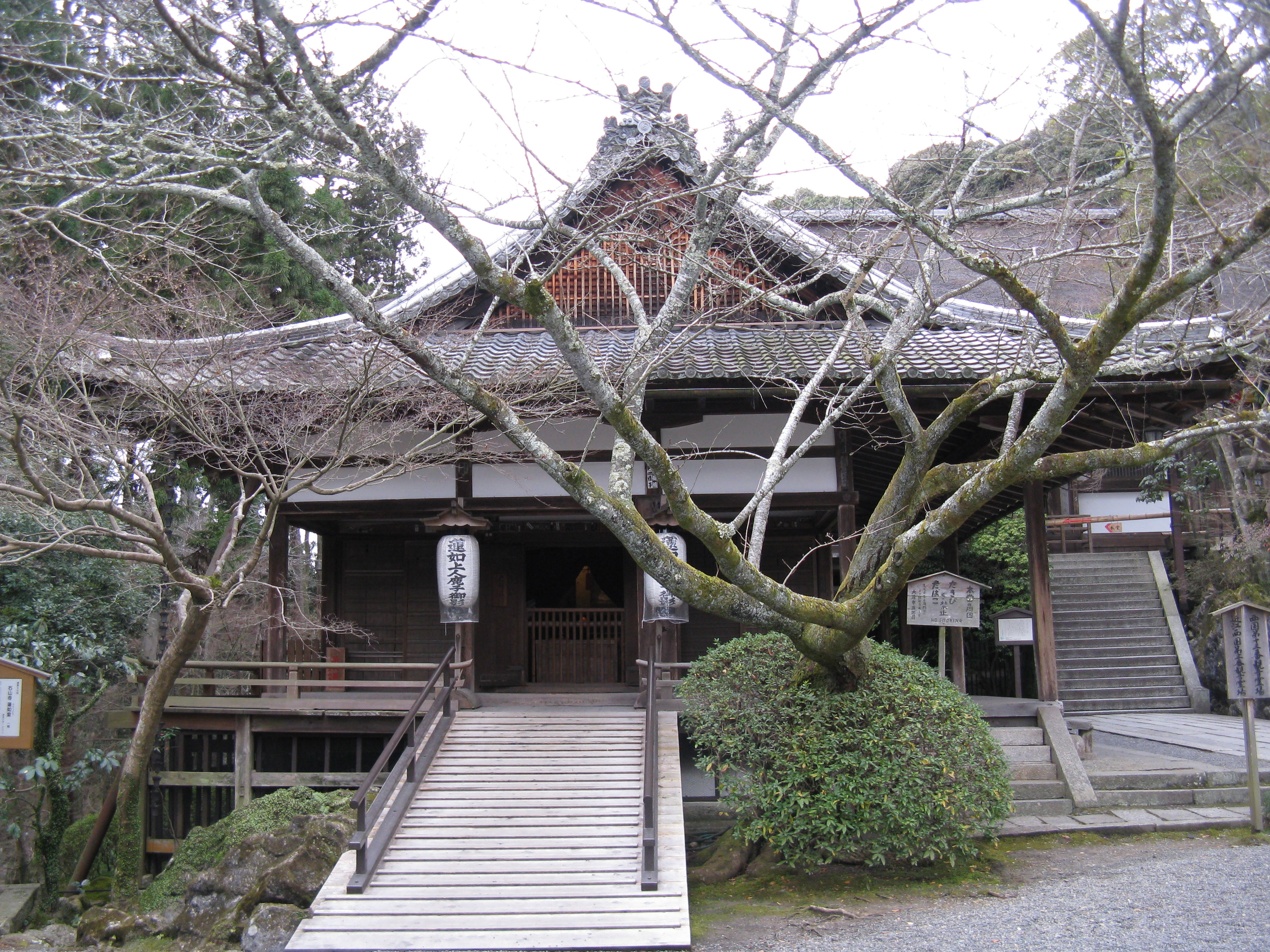
Rennyō-dō

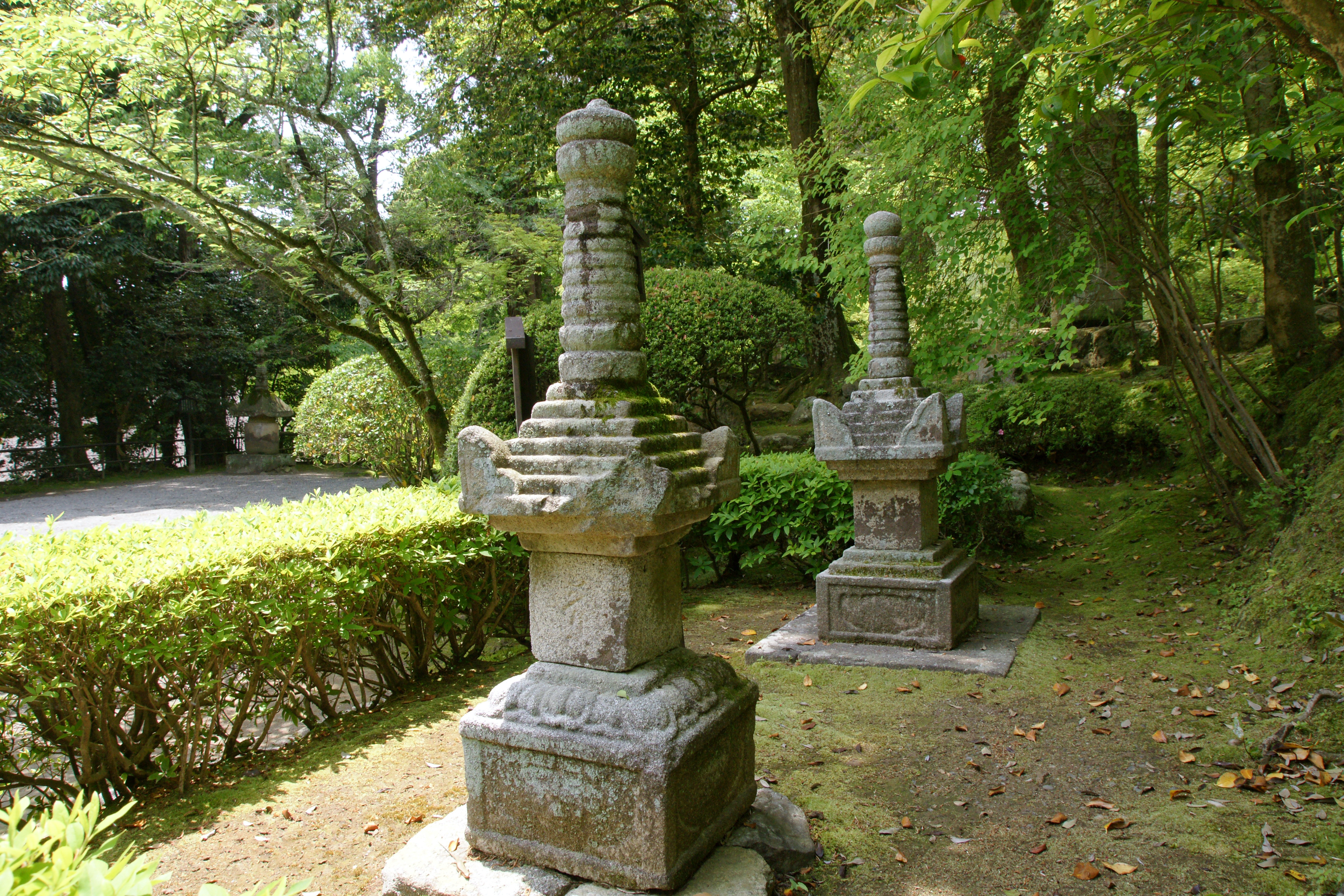
Hōkyōintō（the one in back is an ICP）

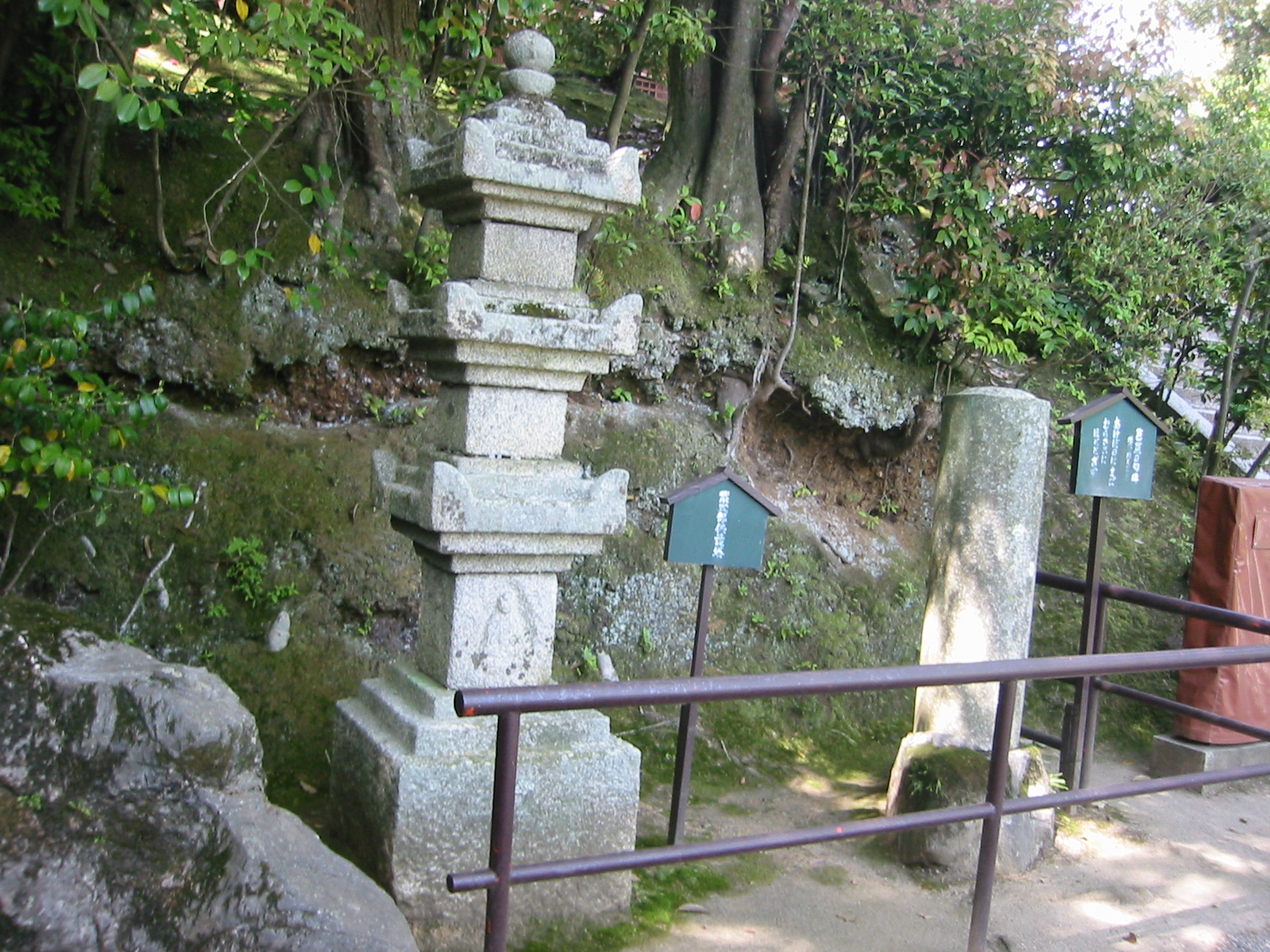
Murasaki Shikubu Memorial and Matsuo Basho poem

The temple is about a 10-minute walk from Ishiyamadera Station on the Keihan Railway Ishiyama Sakamoto Line.

== Cultural Properties ==
=== National Treasures ===
- Hondō, (本堂), Heian period (1096);
- Tahōtō, (多宝塔 附：棟札 1枚）), Heian period (1194);
- Book of Han, Chronicles of Emperor Gao, Volume 2, (漢書 高帝紀下、列伝第四残巻 2巻（紙背金剛界念誦私記）), Nara period; two scrolls
- Shiji, Volumes 96 and 97 (史記 巻第九十六、九十七残巻 紙背金剛界次第）), Nara period; one scroll
- Gyōkuhen, Volume 27, Part 2 (玉篇巻第廿七 後半 (紙背如意輪陀羅尼経）), Heian period; two scrolls
- The Spring and Autumn Classics, Volume 26, Remaining (春秋経伝集解 巻第廿六残), Heian period; one scroll
- The Spring and Autumn Classics, Volume 29, Remaining (春秋経伝集解 巻第廿九残巻（紙背金剛界儀軌）), Heian period; one scroll
- Shaku-Maka-en Ron (釈摩訶衍論), Tang Dynasty; five volumes
- Sacred Teachings by Jun'yu Naigu (淳祐内供筆聖教（薫聖教）), Heian period; 73 scrolls, 1 volume
- Enryaku Transition Ceremony (延暦交替式（紙背南天竺般若悉曇十八章)), Heian period; 1 scroll
- Enryaku Transition Ceremony (延暦交替式（紙背南天竺般若悉曇十八章)), Heian period; 1 scroll
- Remaining Volume of the Record of Grain Distribution in the Etchū Government Warehouse (越中国官倉納穀交替記残巻（紙背伝三昧耶戒私記）), Heian period; 1 scroll
- Remaining Volume of the Record of Grain Distribution in the Etchu Government Warehouse (周防国玖珂郡玖珂郷延喜八年戸籍残巻（紙背金剛界入曼荼羅受三昧耶戒行儀）), Heian period (908); 1 scroll

=== National Important Cultural Properties ===
==== Structures ====
- East Gate (東大門), Keichō era (1596–1614);
- Shōrō (鐘楼), late Kamakura period (1275–1332);
- Ishiyama-dera structures (東大門), including Mikage-dō (御影堂), mid-Muromachi period (1393–1466)Rennyō-dō (蓮如堂) Azuchi-Momoyama period (1602) Sanju-hachi-sho Gongen-sha Honden (三十八所権現社本殿) Azuchi-Momoyama period (1602) Kyōzō (経蔵) Keichō era (1596–1614);
- Hōkyōintō (宝篋印塔), early Muromachi period (1333–1392);

==== Paintings ====
- Colored Silk Painting of Fudō Myōō and two Dōji (絹本著色不動明王二童子像), Kamakura period;
- Colored Silk Painting of Nehan-zu (絹本著色仏涅槃図), Kamakura period;
- Colored Paper Genji Monogatari, Suetsumuhana chapter, (紙本著色源氏物語末摘花巻 (伝・土佐光起筆)), Edo period; attributed to Tosa Mitsuoki
- Colored Paper Ishiyama-dera Engi (紙本著色石山寺縁起(巻第六・七絵 谷文晁補写)), Edo period; (Volume 6, 7, Supplementary Copy by Etani Buncho)
- Ishiyama-dera Tahōtō Pillar Paintings (石山寺多宝塔柱絵), Kamakura period, 4 pillars

==== Crafts ====
- Bonshō (梵鐘), Heian period;

==== Archaeologucal Artifacts ====
- Bronze bell with a kesadasu design (袈裟襷文銅鐸), Yayoi period;

==== Sculpture ====
- Wooden Half-Kneeling Statue of Nyōirin Kannon (木造如意輪観音半跏像（本尊）), Heian period;
- Artifacts found inside Statue of Nyōirin Kannon (木造如意輪観音半跏像 . 像内納入品）), Heian period;
- Wooden Statue of seated Dainichi Nyorai (木造大日如来坐像（多宝塔安置）), Kamakura period; located in Tahōtō, made by Kaikei
- Wooden Statue of seated Dainichi Nyorai (木造大日如来坐像（伝・元多宝塔本尊））), Heian period; formerly located in Tahōtō
- Gilt-bronze Standing Kannon Bosatsu (金銅観世音菩薩立像), Nara period; It was stolen in 1947, and only the torso below the neck was later discovered. The severed head remains missing.
- Bronze Seated Shaka Nyorai (銅造釈迦如来坐像), Asuka period; 13.0-cm
- Wooden standing statue of Jikokten (木造持国天立像), Heian period;
- Wooden standing statue of Zōchōten (木造増長天立像), Heian period;
- Wooden standing statue of Bishamonten' (木造毘沙門天立像), Heian period;
- Wooden Seated Statue of Vimalakirti (木造維摩居士坐像), early Heian period; 49.5-cm
- Wooden Standing Statue of Bishamon-ten (木造毘沙門天立像), Heian period; 172.5-cm
- Wooden Seated Statue of Fudō Myōō (木造不動明王坐像), Heian period;
- Wooden Seated Statue of Jun'yu Naiju (塑造淳祐内供坐像), Muromachi period (1392–1393);
- Core of a Standing Statue of Zaō Gongen' (塑造淳祐内供坐像), Nara period; Includes a set of sculpture fragments, one halo, and items placed inside the core (one wooden stupa-shaped statue, one wooden reliquary container, and one Heart Sutra inscribed in ink on paper). This core was found inside a clay statue. It was discovered inside the statue of Zao Gongen, the right-hand attendant of the principal image, that dates to the Edo period, the core dates back to the statue's construction in the Nara period

==== Calligraphy and ancient documents ====
- Biography of Eizan Daishi' (叡山大師伝), Kamakura period;
- Ten Recitations of the Vinaya (Volume 52) (十誦律 巻第五十二), Nara period; dated 768
- Great Prajnaparamita Sutra, Middle volume (大般若経音義 中巻), Heian period;
- Biography of Chisho Daishi (智証大師伝), Heian period (1108);
- Amoghavajra's Compilation of Tripitaka Tablets, Volume 3' (不空三蔵表制集 巻第三), Heian period;
- The Buddha's Sutra on the Obstacles to Purification of One's Work (by Kibi Yuri) (仏説浄業障経（天平神護二年吉備由利願経）), Nara period (766);
- Abhidharma-ronki (倶舎論記), Heian period; 22 volumes by Fukō, 30 volumes by Hoho and 5 volumes by Enki
- The Aryasarvastivada-Kusha-Sha (説一切有部倶舎論 仙釈筆), Nara period (745);
- Commentary on the Lotus Sutra, 7 volumes (仏説浄業障経（天平神護二年吉備由利願経）), Heian period;
- Complete Sutra Collection at Ishiyama-dera (石山寺一切経), Nara - Muromachi period; 4644 volumes, (with: Miscellaneous Treasure Sutra, Volume 4 (Sutra of the Vows Made on the First Day of May by Empress Komyo), 199 volumes)
- Ishiyama-dera Arakura Sacred Sutra (石山寺校倉聖教), Heian - Muromachi period; 1926 volumes in 30 Sutra Boxes
- A Collection of Japanese Texts (本朝文粋零本), Kamakura period
- Land Survey Record from the Kenkyu Era (建久年中検田帳), Kamakura period; 2 scrolls
- Abridged Travels on Paper in Ink (Enchinki) (行歴抄 円珍記), Kamakura period

=== Shiga Prefecture Designated Tangible Cultural Properties ===
- Bishamon-do (毘沙門堂), Edo period (1773)

=== Ōtsu City Designated Tangible Cultural Properties ===
- Colored silk portrait of Murasaki Shikibu, attributed to Kano Takanobu. (絹本著色紫式部像 伝狩野孝信筆), Edo period (1773)
- Ishiyama-dera Chisokuan Collection (石山寺知足庵コレクション), Edo period
- Roof tiles (古瓦), Edo period; 26 pcs
- Ancient Roof tiles (古瓦譜), Edo period
- Colored wood panel painting of a tethered horse. (板絵著色繋馬図), Edo period
- Junrei-satsu (順礼札), Edo period; five pcs

== See also ==
- List of National Treasures of Japan (temples)
- List of National Treasures of Japan (writings: Japanese books)
- List of National Treasures of Japan (writings: Classical Chinese books)
- List of National Treasures of Japan (writings: others)
- List of National Treasures of Japan (ancient documents)
