= Futai-ji =

Buddhist temple in Nara, Japan

Coordinates: 34°41′41″N 135°48′45″E

Futai-ji (Narihira-dera)
- 不退寺
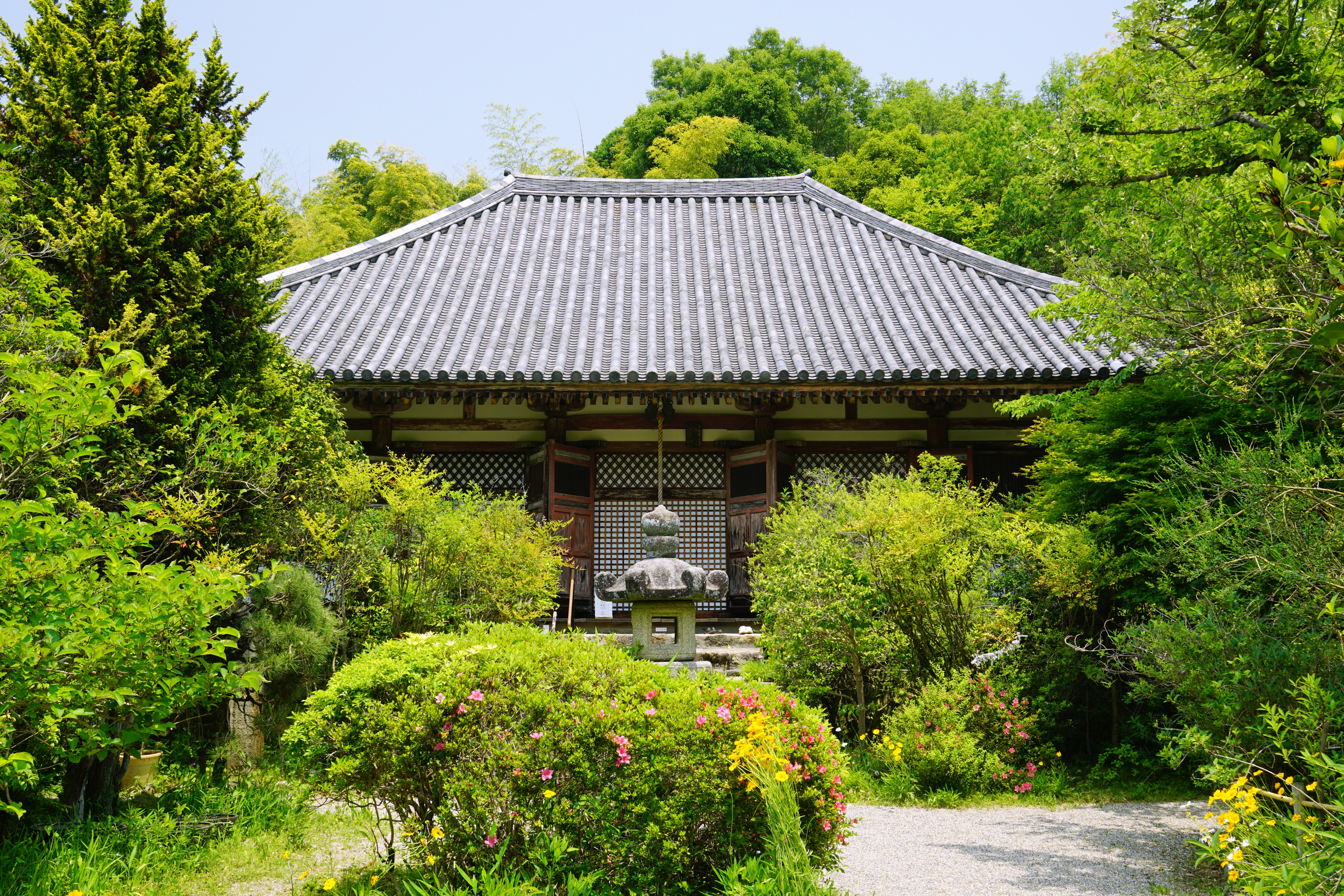
- Hondō

Religion
- Affiliation: Buddhist
- Sect: Shingon Risshu
- Prefecture: Nara prefecture

Location
- Municipality: Nara City
- Country: Japan
- Interactive map of Futai-ji (Narihira-dera)
- Prefecture: Nara prefecture

Architecture
- Established: 845

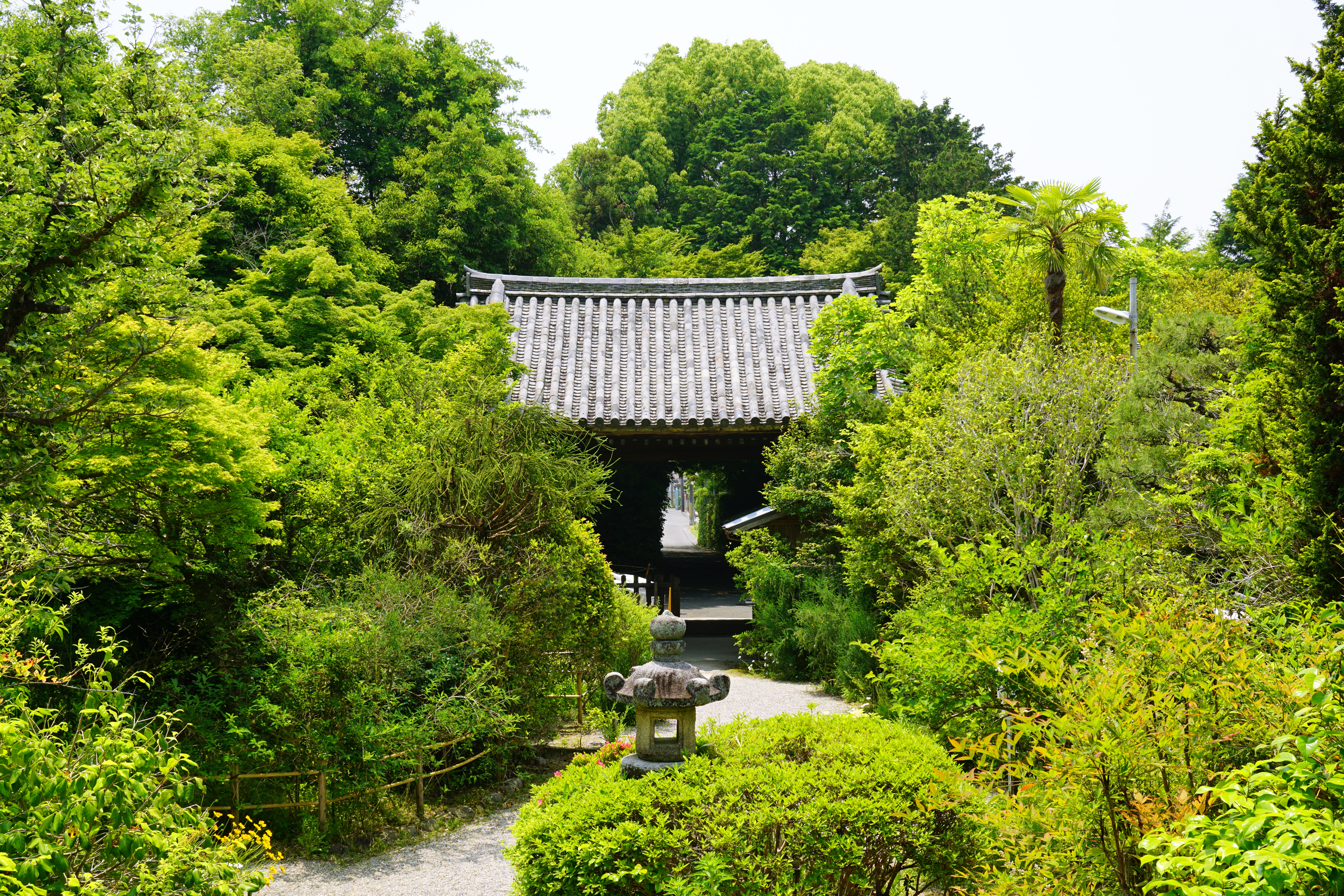
Mimami-mon

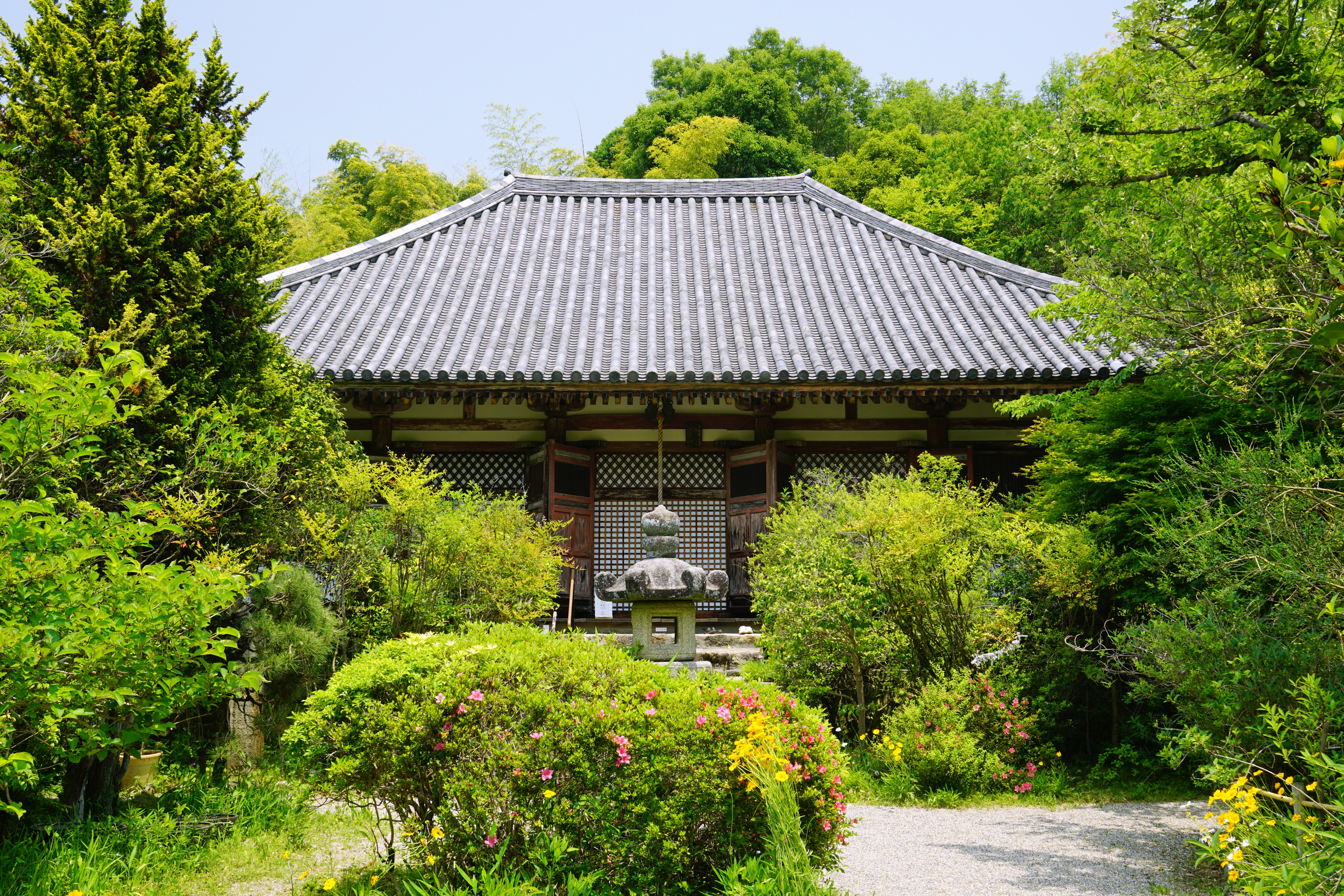
Hondo

Futai-ji (不退寺), also known as Narihira-dera (業平寺), is a Buddhist temple in Nara, Japan.

The temple was opened by Ariwara no Narihira in 847, known as the author of the Tales of Ise. The temple was built over a place where it was formerly a mansion of Narihira's grandfather, former Emperor Heizei. The main hall houses a Shō-kannon (聖観音) (a form of Avalokiteśvara or Guan Yin) buddha image as its primary worship object, surrounded by five Myo-O, as well as a small Shinto shrine also inside the same building.
