= Red White and Blue =

Red White and Blue may refer to:

== Film ==
- Red White & Blue (film), a 2010 film by Simon Rumley
- The Three Colors trilogy or Red, White, and Blue, a film trilogy by Krzysztof Kieślowski
- Red, White and Blue (2020 film), a Steve McQueen film from the Small Axe anthology series
- Red, White and Blue (2023 film), a short film by Nazrin Choudhury

== Music ==
- Norway in red, white and blue, a 1941 national song
- Red, White & Blues, a 1992 album by The Blues Brothers
- "Red, White and Blue" (song), a 1976 song by Loretta Lynn
- "Red White & Blue" (Lynyrd Skynyrd song) (2003)
- "Columbia, Gem of the Ocean" or "The Red, White and Blue", an American patriotic song

== Other uses ==
- Red, White and Blue (ship), a lifeboat that crossed the Atlantic in 1866
- Red White & Blue Beer, a brand of American beer
- Red-white-blue bag, a bag made out of colored canvas
- Flag of the United States, known by the nickname "the Red, White, and Blue"
- Flag of the Netherlands, known by the nickname "Rood-wit-blauw" (meaning Red, White, and Blue)
- Red, White and Blue (comics), characters in comics by All-American Publications
- Red White Blue, an artwork series by Stanley Wong
- Red White & Blue Thrift Store, a chain of charity shop in the US

== See also ==
- Bleu, blanc et rouge (disambiguation), French for "blue, white and red"
- Flags that contain red, white, and blue
- Pan-Slavic colors
