= List of cultural properties of Japan – paintings (Aichi) =

This list is of the cultural properties of Japan designated in the category of paintings (絵画, kaiga) for the Prefecture of Aichi.

== National Cultural Properties ==
As of 1 July 2020, fifty-one Important Cultural Properties have been designated (including two *National Treasures), being of national significance.

Property	Date	Municipality	Ownership	Comments	Image	Dimensions	Coordinates	Ref.
*Genji Monogatari Emaki, colour on paper 紙本著色源氏物語絵巻〈絵十五面／詞二十八面〉 shihon chakushoku Genji Monogatari emaki	C12	Nagoya	Tokugawa Art Museum	43 sections, 15 illustrated, 28 of text			35°11′02″N 136°56′00″E	
*Huike Offering His Arm to Bodhidharma, light colour on paper, by Sesshū 紙本墨画淡彩慧可断臂図〈雪舟筆/七十七歳の款記がある〉 shihon bokuga tansai Eka danbi zu (Sesshū hitsu)	1496	Tokoname	Sainen-ji (斉年寺)				34°55′57″N 136°49′33″E	
Former Hōjō partition paintings, by Nagasawa Rosetsu 旧方丈障壁画〈長沢芦雪筆／〉 kyū-Hōjō shōhekiga (Nagasawa Rosetsu hitsu)	C18	Toyohashi	Shōjū-ji (正宗寺)	Forty-two panels			34°48′25″N 137°28′25″E	
Quail in the Autumn Grass, colour on gold ground, six-fold byōbu 金地著色秋草鶉図〈／六曲屏風〉 kinji chakusoku akikusa uzura zu	Edo period	Nagoya	Nagoya City Museum	Pair of screens			35°08′11″N 136°56′06″E	
Illustrated Legends of Iwashimizu Hachimangū, colour on silk 絹本著色石清水八幡宮縁起絵（伝大山崎離宮八幡利益縁起） kenpon chakushoku Iwashimizu Hachimangū engi-e (den-Ōyamazaki Rikyū Hachiman riyaku engi)	Kamakura period	Nagoya	Tokugawa Art Museum	One scroll			35°11′02″N 136°56′00″E	
Royal Palace Mandala, colour on silk 絹本著色王宮曼荼羅図 kenpon chakushoku ōkyū mandara zu	1312	Toyokawa	Daion-ji (大恩寺)	Goryeo Buddhist painting		133.3 centimetres (52.5 in) by 51.4 centimetres (20.2 in)	34°49′14″N 137°18′38″E	
Mounted Warrior, traditionally identified as Ashikaga Takauji, colour on silk 絹本著色騎馬武者像〈／（伝足利尊氏像）〉 kenpon chakushoku kiba musha zō (den-Ashikaga Takauji zō)	Muromachi period	Nagoya	Jizō-in (地蔵院) (kept at Nagoya City Museum)			97.0 centimetres (38.2 in) by 56.3 centimetres (22.2 in)	35°08′11″N 136°56′06″E	
Kōmyō Honzon, colour on silk 絹本著色光明本尊 kenpon chakushoku kōmyō honzon	Kamakura period	Okazaki	Myōgen-ji (妙源寺)	Three scrolls		161.4 centimetres (63.5 in) by 39.0 centimetres (15.4 in); 177.0 centimetres (69.7 in) by 42.0 centimetres (16.5 in); 162.0 centimetres (63.8 in) by 40.2 centimetres (15.8 in)	34°56′56″N 137°07′27″E	
Treasure Tower of the Three Thousand Buddha Names, colour on silk 絹本著色三千仏名宝塔図 kenpon chakushoku sanzen Butsu-myō hōtō zu	1333	Shinshiro	Fuka-ji (冨賀寺)			128.4 centimetres (50.6 in) by 658 centimetres (21 ft 7 in)	34°51′44″N 137°31′46″E	
Sixteen Arhats, colour on silk 絹本著色十六羅漢像 kenpon chakushoku jūroku rakan zō	Yuan	Shinshiro	Myōkō-ji (妙興寺) (kept at Ichinomiya City Museum (一宮市博物館))	Sixteen scrolls			35°17′02″N 136°48′00″E	

== Prefectural Cultural Properties ==
Ninety-seven properties have been designated at a prefectural level.

Property	Date	Municipality	Ownership	Comments	Image	Dimensions	Coordinates	Ref.
Watanabe Moritsuna, colour on silk 絹本著色渡辺半蔵守網像 kenpon chakushoku Watanabe Hanzō Moritsuna zō	Edo period	Toyota	Shukō-ji (守綱寺) (kept at the Toyota City Museum of Local History (豊田市郷土資料館))			147 centimetres (58 in) by 54.6 centimetres (21.5 in)	35°05′38″N 137°09′36″E	
Water-Moon Avalokiteśvara, colour on silk 絹本著色楊柳観音像 kenpon chakushoku Yōryū Kannon zō	2nd half C14	Nishio	Yōju-ji (養寿寺) (kept at the Iwase Bunko Library (西尾市岩瀬文庫))	Goryeo Buddhist painting		101.0 centimetres (39.8 in) by 56.0 centimetres (22.0 in)	34°52′28″N 137°03′14″E	
Jizō Bosatsu, colour on silk 絹本著色地蔵菩薩像 kenpon chakushoku Jizō Bosatsu zō	C14	Nishio	Yōju-ji (養寿寺) (kept at the Iwase Bunko Library (西尾市岩瀬文庫))	Goryeo Buddhist painting		101.0 centimetres (39.8 in) by 56.0 centimetres (22.0 in)	34°52′28″N 137°03′14″E	

== Municipal Cultural Properties ==
Properties designated at a municipal level include:

Property	Date	Municipality	Ownership	Comments	Image	Dimensions	Coordinates	Ref.
Amitabha with Eight Great Bodhisattvas 阿弥陀八菩薩像; Amida hachi bosatsu zō	mid-/late C14	Nishio	Keigan-ji (桂岩寺) (kept at the Iwase Bunko Library (西尾市岩瀬文庫))	Goryeo Buddhist painting		139.4 centimetres (54.9 in) by 85.0 centimetres (33.5 in)	34°52′28″N 137°03′14″E	

== See also ==
- Cultural Properties of Japan
- List of National Treasures of Japan (paintings)
- Japanese painting
- List of Historic Sites of Japan (Aichi)
