= List of cultural properties of Japan – paintings (Kyoto) =

This list is of the cultural properties of Japan designated in the category of paintings (絵画, kaiga) for the Urban Prefecture of Kyōto.

== National Cultural Properties ==
As of 1 September 2015, four hundred and eighty-two Important Cultural Properties (including forty-four *National Treasures) have been designated, being of national significance.

Property	Date	Municipality	Ownership	Comments	Image	Dimensions	Coordinates	Ref.
*Enma-ten, colour on silk 絹本著色閻魔天像 kenpon chakushoku Enma-ten zō	Kamakura period	Fushimi-ku	Daigo-ji			129.1 centimetres (50.8 in) by 65.5 centimetres (25.8 in)	34°57′04″N 135°49′10″E	
Shaka Nyorai, colour on silk The Ten Principle Disciples, colour on silk 絹本著色釈迦如来像 一 絹本著色十大弟子像 二 kenpon chakushoku Shaka Nyorai zō ichi kenpon chakushoku jū dai deshi-zō ni	Goryeo, Kamakura period	Kyoto (Sakyō-ku)	Zenrin-ji	Goryeo Buddhist painting		177.9 centimetres (70.0 in) by 106.9 centimetres (42.1 in) (Amida)	35°00′52″N 135°47′43″E	
Partition paintings from the Oku Shoin and Genkan-no-ma 奥書院及玄関之間障壁画 oku shoin oyobi genkan no ma shōhekiga	Momoyama period	Kyoto (Kamigyō-ku)	Myōren-ji (妙蓮寺)	thirty-eight panels			35°01′52″N 135°42′50″E	
Partition paintings from the Former Enman-in Shinden 旧円満院宸殿障壁画 kyū-Enman-in shinden shōhekiga	Edo period	Kyoto	Kyoto National Museum	six panels			34°59′24″N 135°46′25″E	
Paulownia and bamboo, colour on gold ground Young pine, colour on gold ground Podocarpus and crab apple, colour on gold ground 金地著色桐ニ竹図〈床間貼付三／襖貼付四〉 金地著色若松図〈違棚壁貼付三／〉 金地著色槇ニ海棠図〈襖貼付四／〉 kinji chakushoku kiri ni take zu kinji chakushoku waka matsu zu kinji chakushoku maki ni kaidō zu	Momoyama period	Kyoto (Sakyō-ku)	Hōnen-in (法然院)	seven panels (four in the tokonoma and three fusuma), three panels (on the chigaidana wall), and four panels (on fusuma) respectively			35°01′26″N 135°47′51″E	
Pine and Plum, colour on gold ground, two-panel byōbu 金地著色松ニ梅図〈／二曲屏風〉 kinji chakushoku matsu ni ume zu (nikyoku byōbu)	Momoyama period	Kyoto (Higashiyama-ku)	Chishaku-in (智積院)	pair of screens			34°59′14″N 135°46′35″E	
Pines, colour on gold ground, attributed to Sōtatsu 金地著色松図〈伝宗達筆／襖貼付 八／戸襖貼付 四〉 kinji chakushoku matsu zu (den-Sōtatsu hitsu)	Edo period	Kyoto (Higashiyama-ku)	Yōgen-in (養源院)	twelve panels			34°59′16″N 135°46′25″E	
Tai Gong Wang, colour on gold ground, two-panel byōbu, by Ogata Kōrin 金地著色太公望図〈尾形光琳筆／二曲屏風〉 kinji chakushoku Tai Kōbō zu (Ogata Kōrin hitsu / nikyoku byōbu)	early Edo period	Kyoto	Kyoto National Museum			166.6 centimetres (65.6 in) by 180.2 centimetres (70.9 in)	34°59′24″N 135°46′25″E	
Pines on the Strand, colour on gold ground 金地著色浜松図 kinji chakushoku hamamatsu zu	Edo period	Kyoto (Higashiyama-ku)	Shōren-in	seventeen panels			35°00′26″N 135°47′00″E	
Peonies, colour on silk 絹本著色牡丹図 kenpon chakushoku botan zu	Yuan dynasty	Kyoto (Kita-ku)	Kōtō-in	pair of scrolls			35°00′19″N 135°46′56″E	
Peonies, colour on silk 絹本著色牡丹図 kenpon chakushoku botan zu	Yuan dynasty	Kyoto (Higashiyama-ku)	Chion-in				35°00′19″N 135°46′56″E	
Amitabha Sutra Mandala, colour on silk 絹本著色阿弥陀経曼荼羅図 kenpon chakushoku Amida-kyō mandara zu	Kamakura period	Kyoto (Higashiyama-ku)	Chion-in				35°00′19″N 135°46′56″E	
Willow Kannon, colour on silk 絹本著色楊柳観音像〈徐九方筆／至治三年六月の年記がある〉 kenpon chakushoku Yōryū Kannon zō	1323	Kyoto (Sakyō-ku)	Sen-oku Hakuko Kan	Goryeo Buddhist painting		164.8 centimetres (64.9 in) by 101.7 centimetres (40.0 in)	35°01′03″N 135°47′34″E	
Sunset along the Floral Embankment, light colour on paper, by Yun Shouping 紙本淡彩花隖夕陽図〈惲南田筆／辛亥（康煕十年）の自題がある〉 shihon tansai kao sekiyō zu	1671	Kyoto	Kyoto National Museum			24.2 centimetres (9.5 in) by 106.1 centimetres (41.8 in)	34°59′24″N 135°46′25″E	
Xuansha Giving a Sermon, ink on silk 絹本墨画玄沙接物利生図 kenpon bokuga Gensha setsumotsu rishō zu	Yuan dynasty	Kyoto	Kyoto National Museum			103.0 centimetres (40.6 in) by 46.0 centimetres (18.1 in)	34°59′24″N 135°46′25″E	
Vimalakirti, ink on silk 絹本墨画維摩居士像 kenpon bokuga Yuima Koji zō	Southern Song	Kyoto	Kyoto National Museum			91.5 centimetres (36.0 in) by 51.3 centimetres (20.2 in)	34°59′24″N 135°46′25″E	
Returning Sails off Distant Shore, ink on paper, attributed to Muqi 紙本墨画遠浦帰帆図〈（伝牧谿筆）／〉 shihon bokuga enpo kihan zu (den-Mokkei hitsu)	Southern Song	Kyoto	Kyoto National Museum				34°59′24″N 135°46′25″E	
Kanō Tan'yū, ink on paper, attributed to Momoda Ryūei 紙本著色狩野探幽像〈（伝桃田柳栄筆）／〉 shihon chakushoku Kanō Tanyū zō (den-Momoda Ryūei hitsu)	C17	Kyoto	Kyoto National Museum			65.8 centimetres (25.9 in) by 48.2 centimetres (19.0 in)	34°59′24″N 135°46′25″E	
Huang Chuping, ink on paper, by Sesshū, after Liang Kai 紙本墨画黄初平図〈雪舟筆／（〓梁偕）〉 shihon bokuga Kō Shohei zu (Sesshū hitsu)	Muromachi period	Kyoto	Kyoto National Museum			30.2 centimetres (11.9 in) by 30.6 centimetres (12.0 in)	34°59′24″N 135°46′25″E	
Landscape, ink and light colour on paper, by Sessō 紙本墨画淡彩山水図〈／拙宗筆〉 shihon bokuga tansai sansui zu (Sessō hitsu)	Muromachi period	Kyoto	Kyoto National Museum			98.2 centimetres (38.7 in) by 33.2 centimetres (13.1 in)	34°59′24″N 135°46′25″E	
Fine Steed, colour on paper 紙本著色駿馬図〈／周麟賛〉 shihon chakushoku shunme zu	Muromachi period	Kyoto	Kyoto National Museum			65.8 centimetres (25.9 in) by 57.8 centimetres (22.8 in)	34°59′24″N 135°46′25″E	
Small Bird on a Sasanqua, colour on paper 紙本著色山茶花小禽図 shihon chakushoku sazanka shōkin zu	Muromachi period	Kyoto	Kyoto National Museum	inscribed by Zuikei Shūhō (瑞渓周鳳) (1392-1473)		86.5 centimetres (34.1 in) by 31.7 centimetres (12.5 in)	34°59′24″N 135°46′25″E	
Otokoyama Hachiman Shrine Mandala, colour on silk 絹本著色男山八幡宮曼荼羅図 kenpon chakushoku Otokoyama Hachiman Miya mandara zu	Nanboku-chō period	Kyoto	Kyoto National Museum			137.6 centimetres (54.2 in) by 63.6 centimetres (25.0 in)	34°59′24″N 135°46′25″E	
Mounted Warrior, colour on silk 絹本著色騎馬武者像 kenpon chakushoku kiba musha zō	Nanboku-chō period	Kyoto	Kyoto National Museum				34°59′24″N 135°46′25″E	
Mokuan Shūyu, colour on silk 絹本著色黙庵周諭像 kenpon chakushoku Mokuan Shūyu zō	1373	Kyoto	Kyoto National Museum			108.3 centimetres (42.6 in) by 47.5 centimetres (18.7 in)	34°59′24″N 135°46′25″E	
Summer and Winter Landscapes, ink and light colour on paper, by Sesson 紙本墨画淡彩夏冬山水図〈雪村筆／〉 shihon bokuga tansai natsu fuyu sansui zu (Sesson hitsu)	Muromachi period	Kyoto	Kyoto National Museum				34°59′24″N 135°46′25″E	
Ususama Myōō, colour on silk 絹本著色鳥枢沙摩明王像 kenpon chakushoku Ususama Myōō zō	Heian period	Kyoto	Kyoto National Museum			78.0 centimetres (30.7 in) by 58.0 centimetres (22.8 in)	34°59′24″N 135°46′25″E	
Kōfukuji Mandala, colour on silk 絹本著色興福寺曼荼羅図 kenpon chakushoku Kōfukuji mandara zu	Kamakura period	Kyoto	Kyoto National Museum			96.8 centimetres (38.1 in) by 38.8 centimetres (15.3 in)	34°59′24″N 135°46′25″E	
Grazing Ox, light colour on paper 紙本淡彩放牛図 kenpon chakushoku Kōfukuji mandara zu	Muromachi period	Kyoto	Kyoto National Museum			66.6 centimetres (26.2 in) by 36.4 centimetres (14.3 in)	34°59′24″N 135°46′25″E	
Ancient Temple amid Spring Clouds, ink on paper 紙本墨画古寺春曇図 shihon bokuga koji haru gumori zu	1431	Kyoto	Kyoto National Museum				34°59′24″N 135°46′25″E	
Pine, Plum, and Bamboo in the Snow, ink on paper 紙本墨画雪裡三友図 shihon bokuga setsuri sanyū zu	Muromachi period	Kyoto	Kyoto National Museum			131.5 centimetres (51.8 in) by 37.3 centimetres (14.7 in)	34°59′24″N 135°46′25″E	
Farewell to a Departing Boat, ink on paper 紙本墨画舟行送別図 shihon bokuga shūkō sōbetsu zu	Muromachi period	Kyoto	Kyoto National Museum			100.9 centimetres (39.7 in) by 29.8 centimetres (11.7 in)	34°59′24″N 135°46′25″E	
View of a Lake and Mountains, light colour on paper 紙本淡彩湖山八景図〈／慧鳳賛〉 shihon tansai kozan hakkei zu (Ehō san)	C15	Kyoto	Kyoto National Museum	with calligraphy by Kōshi Ehō (慧鳳)		121.1 centimetres (47.7 in) by 34.6 centimetres (13.6 in)	34°59′24″N 135°46′25″E	
Lotus Sutra (fragment), colour on paper, emaki 紙本著色法華経絵巻〈残闕／〉 shihon chakushoku Hoke-kyō emaki (zanketsu)	Kamakura period	Kyoto	Kyoto National Museum			31.8 centimetres (12.5 in) by 129.3 centimetres (50.9 in)	34°59′24″N 135°46′25″E	
Aizen Myōō, colour on silk 絹本著色愛染明王像 kenpon chakushoku Aizen Myōō zō	Kamakura period	Fushimi-ku	Daigo-ji			120.9 centimetres (47.6 in) by 77.5 centimetres (30.5 in)	34°57′04″N 135°49′10″E	
Amida Triad, colour on silk 絹本著色阿弥陀三尊像 kenpon chakushoku Amida sanzon zō	Kamakura period	Fushimi-ku	Daigo-ji			99.3 centimetres (39.1 in) by 43.8 centimetres (17.2 in)	34°57′04″N 135°49′10″E	
Miroku Bosatsu, colour on silk 絹本著色弥勒菩薩像 kenpon chakushoku Miroku Bosatsu zō	Kamakura period	Fushimi-ku	Daigo-ji			94.7 centimetres (37.3 in) by 51.4 centimetres (20.2 in)	34°57′04″N 135°49′10″E	
Jizō Bosatsu, colour on silk 絹本著色地蔵菩薩像 kenpon chakushoku Jizō Bosatsu zō	Kamakura period	Kyoto (Fushimi-ku)	Daigo-ji			118.5 centimetres (46.7 in) by 54.8 centimetres (21.6 in)	34°57′04″N 135°49′10″E	
Images of Kami, colour on wooden boards 板絵著色神像 ita-e chakushoku Shinzō zō	1286	Ōyamazaki	Hōshaku-ji (宝積寺)	four panels			34°53′45″N 135°40′44″E	
Honden Door Paintings, colour on wooden boards 本殿扉絵（板絵著色） honden tobira-e (ita-e chakushoku)	Heian period	Uji	Ujigami Jinja	four panels			34°53′31″N 135°48′41″E	
Ingen Oshō, colour on paper, by Kita Genki 紙本著色隠元和尚像〈元規筆／〉 shihon chakushoku Ingen Oshō zō (Genki hitsu)	Edo period	Uji	Manpuku-ji				34°54′51″N 135°48′22″E	
Iwashimizu Mandala, colour on silk 絹本著色石清水曼荼羅図 kenpon chakushoku Iwashimizu mandara zu	Kamakura period	Yawata	Shōbō-ji (正法寺)				34°52′13″N 135°42′04″E	
Nyorai, colour on silk 絹本著色如来像 kenpon chakushoku Nyorai zō	late Goryeo	Yawata	Shōbō-ji (正法寺)	Goryeo Buddhist painting		190.0 centimetres (74.8 in) by 87.2 centimetres (34.3 in)	34°52′13″N 135°42′04″E	
Hibiscus, ink on paper, attributed to Muqi 紙本墨画芙蓉図〈（伝牧谿筆）／〉 shihon bokuga fuyō-zu (den-Mokkei hitsu)	Southern Song	Kyoto (Kita-ku)	Daitoku-ji				35°02′38″N 135°44′46″E	

== Prefectural Cultural Properties ==
As of 24 March 2015, fifty-nine properties have been designated at a prefectural level.

Property	Date	Municipality	Ownership	Comments	Image	Dimensions	Coordinates	Ref.
Myōonten, colour on silk 絹本著色妙音天像 kenpon chakushoku Myōonten zō	Muromachi period	Kyoto (Ukyō-ku)	Ninna-ji				35°01′52″N 135°42′50″E	for all refs see
Sokutai Tenjin, colour on silk 絹本著色束帯天神像（根本御影） kenpon chakushoku sokutai Tenjin zō (konpon mikage)	Nanboku-chō/Muromachi period	Kyoto (Kamigyō-ku)	Kitano Tenmangū	referred to as the archetypal view			35°01′52″N 135°44′07″E	
Sokutai Tenjin, colour on silk 絹本著色束帯天神像（遺教院伝来） kenpon chakushoku sokutai Tenjin zō (Yuikyō-in denrai)	Nanboku-chō/Muromachi period	Kyoto (Kamigyō-ku)	Kitano Tenmangū	said to be from the Yuikyō-in			35°01′52″N 135°44′07″E	
Partition paintings from the Hōon-ji Hondō, by Bunrin 報恩寺本堂障壁画 文麟筆; Hōonji hondō shōhekiga Bunrin hitsu	C19	Maizuru	Hōon-ji (報恩寺)	forty-four panels			35°26′48″N 135°25′11″E	
West Lake, ink on paper 紙本墨画西湖図 如奇筆 shihon bokuga seiko zu		Fukuchiyama	Tennei-ji (天寧寺)				35°21′42″N 135°05′18″E	
Shōji Shōketsu, colour on paper 紙本著色総持正傑像 shihon chakushoku Shōji Shōketsu zō	1379	Kyoto	Zenkyoan (禅居庵) (kept at Kyoto National Museum)			71.3 centimetres (2 ft 4.1 in) by 33.3 centimetres (1 ft 1.1 in)	34°59′24″N 135°46′25″E	
Shinran Shōnin, colour on paper 絹本著色親鸞聖人像 kenpon chakushoku Shinran Shōnin zō	1354	Kyoto (Shimogyō-ku)	Jōraku-ji (常楽寺)			135.0 centimetres (4 ft 5.1 in) by 78.7 centimetres (2 ft 7.0 in)	34°59′34″N 135°45′17″E	
Illustration of the Sutra on the Descent of Maitreya, colour on silk 絹本著色弥勒下生経変相図 kenpon chakushoku Miroku geshōkyō hensō zu	1294	Kyoto (Sakyō-ku)	Myōman-ji (妙満寺)	Goryeo Buddhist painting; inscribed 画文翰待詔李晟、至元三十一年甲午		227 centimetres (7 ft 5 in) by 129 centimetres (4 ft 3 in)	35°04′03″N 135°46′28″E	
Kidō Chigu, colour on silk 絹本著色虚堂智愚像 kenpon chakushoku Kidō Chigu zō		Kyoto (Kita-ku)	Zuihō-in (瑞峯院)				35°02′32″N 135°44′43″E	
Hōnen Shōnin, colour on silk 絹本著色法然上人像 kenpon chakushoku Hōnen Shōnin zō		Kyoto (Sakyō-ku)	Konkaikōmyō-ji				35°01′11″N 135°47′17″E	
Tenan Myōju, colour on silk 絹本著色天庵妙受像 kenpon chakushoku Tenan Myōju zō	Nanboku-chō period	Ayabe	Ankoku-ji (安国寺)	three scrolls			35°20′27″N 135°18′26″E	
Matsui Yasuyuki, colour on silk 絹本著色松井康之像 kenpon chakushoku Matsui Yasuyuki zō	Momoyama period	Kyōtango	Sōun-ji (宗雲寺)			75.2 centimetres (29.6 in) by 35.6 centimetres (14.0 in)	35°36′07″N 134°53′11″E	
Matsui Yohachirō, colour on silk 絹本著色松井与八郎像 kenpon chakushoku Matsui Yohachirō zō	Momoyama period	Kyōtango	Hōsen-ji (宝泉寺)			89.9 centimetres (35.4 in) by 36.7 centimetres (14.4 in)	35°38′37″N 134°54′18″E	
Taima Mandala, colour on silk 絹本著色当麻曼荼羅図 kenpon chakushoku Taima mandara zu	Nanboku-chō period	Kyōtango	Hongan-ji (本願寺)				35°36′06″N 134°54′08″E	

== Municipal Cultural Properties ==
Properties designated at a municipal level include:

Property	Date	Municipality	Ownership	Comments	Image	Dimensions	Coordinates	Ref.
Partition paintings in the Hōjō, Keitoku-in 慶徳院方丈障壁画; Keitoku-in hōjō shōhekiga	Edo period	Kyōtango	Keitoku-in (慶徳院)	forty-four panels; by Nagasawa Roshū (長沢芦洲)			35°35′17″N 135°02′08″E	
Ten Kings of Hell, colour on silk 絹本著色十王図 kenpon chakushoku jūō zu	C13	Kyōtango	Enjō-ji (縁城寺)				35°39′34″N 135°04′09″E	
Gushōshin, colour on silk 絹本著色倶生神像 kenpon chakushoku Gushōshin zō	Nanboku-chō period	Kyōtango	Enjō-ji (縁城寺)				35°39′34″N 135°04′09″E	
Nyoirin Kannon, colour on silk 絹本著色如意輪観音像 kenpon chakushoku Nyoirin Kannon zō	Nanboku-chō period	Kyōtango	Enjō-ji (縁城寺)			84.3 centimetres (33.2 in) by 38.8 centimetres (15.3 in)	35°39′34″N 135°04′09″E	
Shaka and the Sixteen Benevolent Deities, colour on silk 絹本著色釈迦十六善神像 kenpon chakushoku Shaka jūroku zenjin zō	late Kamakura period	Kyōtango	Iwaya-ji (岩屋寺)			105.2 centimetres (41.4 in) by 78.1 centimetres (30.7 in)	35°33′23″N 135°05′51″E	
Jizō Bosatsu, colour on silk 絹本著色地蔵菩薩像 kenpon chakushoku Jizō Bosatsu zō	late Kamakura period	Kyōtango	Iwaya-ji (岩屋寺)			116.7 centimetres (45.9 in) by 43.9 centimetres (17.3 in)	35°33′23″N 135°05′51″E	
Five Great Wisdom Kings, colour on silk 絹本著色五大尊像 kenpon chakushoku godaison zō	Kamakura period	Kyōtango	Iwaya-ji (岩屋寺)			120.4 centimetres (47.4 in) by 70.5 centimetres (27.8 in)	35°33′23″N 135°05′51″E	
Bishamonten, colour on silk 絹本著色毘沙門天像 kenpon chakushoku Bishamonten zō	late Kamakura period	Kyōtango	Iwaya-ji (岩屋寺)			118.1 centimetres (46.5 in) by 57.8 centimetres (22.8 in)	35°33′23″N 135°05′51″E	
Legends of the Itsuki-no-Miya Daimyōjin, colour on paper 紙本著色斎宮大明神縁起 shihon chakushoku Itsuki-no-Miya daimyōjin engi	C17	Kyoto	Takano Jinja (竹野神社) (kept at Kyoto National Museum)			30.4 centimetres (12.0 in) by 931.4 centimetres (30 ft 6.7 in)	34°59′24″N 135°46′25″E	
Legends of Tōraku-ji, colour on paper 紙本著色等楽寺縁起 shihon chakushoku Tōrakuji engi	Momoyama period	Kyoto	Takano Jinja (竹野神社) (kept at Kyoto National Museum)			32.0 centimetres (12.6 in) by 516.0 centimetres (16 ft 11.1 in)	34°59′24″N 135°46′25″E	

== See also ==
- Cultural Properties of Japan
- List of National Treasures of Japan (paintings)
- Japanese painting
- List of Cultural Properties of Japan - paintings (Tōkyō)
