= Bleu, blanc et rouge =

Bleu blanc et rouge (French for "blue, white and red") may refer to:

- The Flag of France, whose colors are given as "bleu, blanc et rouge"
- Montreal Bleu Blanc Rouge, a junior ice hockey team
- A common nickname for the professional ice hockey team Montreal Canadiens
- Blue, White and Red Rally (Rassemblement Bleu Blanc Rouge) a nationalist political association in France
- The Three Colors trilogy films
- Bleu-Blanc-Rouge, a 1998 novel by Alain Mabanckou

== See also ==
- Red White and Blue (disambiguation)
