= List of Goryeo Buddhist paintings =

This list is of Goryeo Buddhist paintings, Korea (918–1392). Approximately one hundred and sixty hanging scrolls are known.

Painting	Date	Location	Institution	Comments	Image	Dimensions	Coordinates	Ref.
Royal Palace Mandala, colour on silk 絹本著色王宮曼荼羅図 kenpon chakushoku ōkyū mandara zu 관경서분변상도	1312	Toyokawa	Daion-ji (大恩寺)	dated to 1312 by the inscription in the bottom right corner; Important Cultural Property		133.3 centimetres (4 ft 4.5 in) by 51.4 centimetres (1 ft 8.2 in)	34°49′14″N 137°18′38″E	
Royal Palace Mandala 王宮曼荼羅図 ōkyū mandara zu 관경서분변상도	late Goryeo	Tsuruga	Saifuku-ji (西福寺)			150.5 centimetres (4 ft 11.3 in) by 113.2 centimetres (3 ft 8.6 in)	35°39′25″N 136°01′56″E	
Illustration of the Visualisation Sutra 観経十六観変相図 kangyō jūroku kanhensō zu	1323	Kyoto	Chion-in			224.2 centimetres (7 ft 4.3 in) by 139.1 centimetres (4 ft 6.8 in)	35°00′22″N 135°47′02″E	
Illustration of the Meditation Sutra 観経変相図; Kankyō hensō zu 관경서분변상도	C14	Tsuruga	Saifuku-ji (西福寺)			202.8 centimetres (6 ft 7.8 in) by 129.8 centimetres (4 ft 3.1 in)	35°39′25″N 136°01′56″E	
Illustration of the Sutra on the Descent of Maitreya 弥勒下生経変相図; Miroku geshōkyō hensō zu 미륵하생경변상도	1350	Kōya	Shinnō-in (親王院)			178.0 centimetres (5 ft 10.1 in) by 90.3 centimetres (2 ft 11.6 in)	34°12′50″N 135°34′53″E	
Illustration of the Sutra on the Descent of Maitreya 弥勒下生経変相図; Miroku geshōkyō hensō zu	late Goryeo	Kyoto	Chion-in			171.8 centimetres (5 ft 7.6 in) by 92.1 centimetres (3 ft 0.3 in)	35°00′22″N 135°47′02″E	
Illustration of the Sutra of Perfect Enlightenment 원각경변상도	C14	Boston	Museum of Fine Arts, Boston			165.5 centimetres (5 ft 5.2 in) by 85.5 centimetres (2 ft 9.7 in)	42°20′21″N 71°05′39″W	
Illustration of the Visualisation Sutra, colour on silk 絹本著色観経十六観変相図 kenpon chakushoku kangyō jūroku kanhensō zu	late Goryeo	Takahagi	Ōtakaji (大高寺)	Prefectural Cultural Property		183.0 centimetres (6 ft 0 in) by 121.0 centimetres (3 ft 11.6 in)	36°42′55″N 140°42′33″E	
Illustration of the Sutra on the Descent of Maitreya, colour on silk 絹本著色弥勒下生経変相図 kenpon chakushoku Miroku geshōkyō hensō zu	1294	Kyoto	Myōman-ji (妙満寺)	Important Cultural Property; inscribed 画文翰待詔李晟、至元三十一年甲午		227 centimetres (7 ft 5 in) by 129 centimetres (4 ft 3 in)	35°04′03″N 135°46′28″E	
Sakyamuni Preaching the Law 釈迦説法図; Shaka seppō zu	late Goryeo	Kōya	Shinnō-in (親王院)			178.0 centimetres (5 ft 10.1 in) by 90.3 centimetres (2 ft 11.6 in)	34°12′50″N 135°34′53″E	
Vairocana	late Goryeo	Hiroshima	Fudō-in (不動院)	also known as Fifteen Thousand Buddhas		162.0 centimetres (5 ft 3.8 in) by 88.2 centimetres (2 ft 10.7 in)	34°25′37″N 132°28′16″E	
Vairocana 毘盧遮那仏変相図; Birushana butsu hensō zu	late Goryeo	Hyōgo Prefecture	private			196.0 centimetres (6 ft 5.2 in) by 133.5 centimetres (4 ft 4.6 in)		
Vairocana Triad	late Goryeo	Cologne	Museum für Ostasiatische Kunst, Köln			123.0 centimetres (4 ft 0.4 in) by 82.0 centimetres (2 ft 8.3 in)	50°56′06″N 6°55′32″E	
Bhaisajyaguru Preaching the Law		Kyoto	Chishaku-in (智積院)				34°59′17″N 135°46′35″E	
Buddha Pentad, colour on silk 絹本著色五仏尊像 kenpon chakushoku go-Butsu-son zō	late Goryeo	Takasago	Jūrin-ji (十輪寺)	Important Cultural Property; alternatively dated to the sixteenth century			34°44′50″N 134°47′59″E	
Descent of Tejaprabhā Buddha 치성광여래왕림도	late C14	Boston	Museum of Fine Arts, Boston			124.4 centimetres (4 ft 1.0 in) by 54.8 centimetres (1 ft 9.6 in)	42°20′21″N 71°05′39″W	
Amitabha	1286	Kyoto	private; former Shimazu collection (島津家旧蔵)			203.5 centimetres (6 ft 8.1 in) by 105.1 centimetres (3 ft 5.4 in)		
Amitabha 阿弥陀如来像; Amida Nyorai zō	late Goryeo	Kan'onji	Hagiwara-ji (萩原寺)			110.8 centimetres (3 ft 7.6 in) by 50.4 centimetres (1 ft 7.8 in)	34°04′16″N 133°41′18″E	
Amitabha 如来像 or 阿弥陀如来図; Nyorai zō or Amida Nyorai zu	late Goryeo	Kyoto	Shōbō-ji (正法寺)	Important Cultural Property		190.0 centimetres (6 ft 2.8 in) by 87.2 centimetres (2 ft 10.3 in)		
Amitabha	C14	Kyoto	Tōkai-an (東海庵)			116.4 centimetres (3 ft 9.8 in) by 54.5 centimetres (1 ft 9.5 in)	35°01′22″N 135°43′14″E	
Amitabha, colour on silk 絹本著色阿弥陀如来像 kenpon chakushoku Amida Nyorai zu	1306	Tokyo	Nezu Museum	Important Cultural Property		162.5 centimetres (5 ft 4.0 in) by 91.7 centimetres (3 ft 0.1 in)	35°39′44″N 139°43′02″E	
Amitabha, colour on silk 絹本著色釈迦如来像 kenpon chakushoku Shaka Nyorai zō	late Goryeo	Kyoto	Gyokurin-in (玉林院)	Important Cultural Property		163.0 centimetres (5 ft 4.2 in) by 87.0 centimetres (2 ft 10.3 in)	35°02′33″N 135°44′35″E	
Amitabha 阿弥陀如来像 kenpon chakushoku Amida hachidai bosatsu zō		Higashiōmi	Ishiba-ji (石馬寺)			98.0 centimetres (3 ft 2.6 in) by 55.5 centimetres (1 ft 9.9 in)	35°09′41″N 136°09′52″E	
Bhaisajyaguru 如来像; Nyorai zō	late Goryeo	Nagoya	Banshō-ji			151.0 centimetres (4 ft 11.4 in) by 86.2 centimetres (2 ft 9.9 in)	35°09′33″N 136°54′17″E	
Amitabha, colour on silk 絹本著色釈迦如来像 kenpon chakushoku Shaka Nyorai zō	C14	Kyoto	Zenrin-ji	Important Cultural Property		177.9 centimetres (5 ft 10.0 in) by 106.9 centimetres (3 ft 6.1 in)	35°00′52″N 135°47′43″E	
Amitabha	late Goryeo	Paris	Musée Guimet			104.0 centimetres (3 ft 4.9 in) by 46.0 centimetres (1 ft 6.1 in)	48°51′54″N 2°17′37″E	
Amitabha	C14	Rome	Museo Nazionale d'Arte Orientale			105.6 centimetres (3 ft 5.6 in) by 47.0 centimetres (1 ft 6.5 in)	41°53′40″N 12°30′01″E	
Amitabha, colour on silk 絹本著色阿弥陀如来坐像 kenpon chakushoku Amida Nyorai zazō	late Goryeo	Yaita	Kagamiyama-dera (鏡山寺)	Prefectural Cultural Property; there are two further Goryeo Buddhist paintings at Kōbō-ji (興法寺) in Oyama		149.3 centimetres (4 ft 10.8 in) by 94.0 centimetres (3 ft 1.0 in)	36°50′14″N 139°55′17″E	
Amitabha 아미타여래도	late Goryeo	Yongin	Uhak Cultural Foundation	Treasure No. 1238		105.6 centimetres (3 ft 5.6 in) by 52.3 centimetres (1 ft 8.6 in)		
Amitabha Triad, colour on silk (Amitabha) 絹本著色阿弥陀三尊像 kenpon chakushoku Amida sanzon zu	1309	Yonezawa	Uesugi Jinja (上杉神社)	central scroll of a set of three jointly designated an Important Cultural Property		148 centimetres (4 ft 10 in) by 77 centimetres (2 ft 6 in)	37°54′33″N 140°06′15″E	
Amitabha Triad, colour on silk (Avalokiteśvara) 絹本著色阿弥陀三尊像 kenpon chakushoku Amida sanzon zu	1309	Yonezawa	Uesugi Jinja (上杉神社)	right-hand scroll of a set of three jointly designated an Important Cultural Property		148 centimetres (4 ft 10 in) by 77 centimetres (2 ft 6 in)	37°54′33″N 140°06′15″E	
Amitabha Triad, colour on silk (Mahasthamaprapta) 絹本著色阿弥陀三尊像 kenpon chakushoku Amida sanzon zu	1309	Yonezawa	Uesugi Jinja (上杉神社)	left-hand scroll of a set of three jointly designated an Important Cultural Property		148 centimetres (4 ft 10 in) by 77 centimetres (2 ft 6 in)	37°54′33″N 140°06′15″E	
Amitabha Triad with Ananda and Mahākāśyapa 絹本著色釈迦三尊及阿難迦葉像 kenpon chakushoku Shaka sanzon oyobi Anan Kashō zō	1330	Ogose	Hōon-ji (法恩寺)	Important Cultural Property		119.4 centimetres (3 ft 11.0 in) by 64.2 centimetres (2 ft 1.3 in)	35°57′44″N 139°17′50″E	
Amitabha Triad 阿弥陀三尊図; Amida sanzon zu	late Goryeo	Tokyo	Nezu Museum			111.2 centimetres (3 ft 7.8 in) by 50.9 centimetres (1 ft 8.0 in)	35°39′44″N 139°43′02″E	
Amitabha Triad 阿弥陀三尊図; Amida sanzon zu	late Goryeo	Tokyo	Nezu Museum			129.0 centimetres (4 ft 2.8 in) by 62.0 centimetres (2 ft 0.4 in)	35°39′44″N 139°43′02″E	
Amitabha Triad 阿弥陀三尊図; Amida sanzon zu	late Goryeo	Tokyo	Nezu Museum			139.0 centimetres (4 ft 6.7 in) by 87.9 centimetres (2 ft 10.6 in)	35°39′44″N 139°43′02″E	
Amitabha Triad 阿弥陀三尊図; Amida sanzon zu	late Goryeo	Kakogawa	Kakurin-ji	Important Cultural Property		130.0 centimetres (4 ft 3.2 in) by 73.3 centimetres (2 ft 4.9 in)	34°45′08″N 134°49′57″E	
Amitabha Triad	circa C13	New York City	Metropolitan Museum of Art			114.9 centimetres (3 ft 9.2 in) by 59.1 centimetres (1 ft 11.3 in)	40°46′45″N 73°57′47″W	
Amitabha Triad 阿弥陀三尊図; Amida sanzon zu	late Goryeo	Kyoto	Chion-in			170.3 centimetres (5 ft 7.0 in) by 92.2 centimetres (3 ft 0.3 in)	35°00′22″N 135°47′02″E	
Amitabha Triad 阿弥陀三尊図; Amida sanzon zu	late Goryeo	Kyoto	Chion-in			160.6 centimetres (5 ft 3.2 in) by 80.6 centimetres (2 ft 7.7 in)	35°00′22″N 135°47′02″E	
Amitabha Triad 阿弥陀三尊図; Amida sanzon zu	late Goryeo	Kyoto	Chion-in			160.6 centimetres (5 ft 3.2 in) by 80.6 centimetres (2 ft 7.7 in)	35°00′22″N 135°47′02″E	
Amitabha Triad 阿弥陀三尊図; Amida sanzon zu	late Goryeo	Kyoto	Chion-in			160.6 centimetres (5 ft 3.2 in) by 80.6 centimetres (2 ft 7.7 in)	35°00′22″N 135°47′02″E	
Amitabha Triad 阿弥陀三尊図; Amida sanzon zu	late Goryeo	Sakai	Hōdō-ji (法道寺)	Municipal Cultural Property		166.4 centimetres (5 ft 5.5 in) by 88.8 centimetres (2 ft 11.0 in)	34°27′50″N 135°31′04″E	
Amitabha Triad 阿弥陀三尊図; Amida sanzon zu	C13/14	Tokyo	Tokyo National Museum			122.9 centimetres (4 ft 0.4 in) by 56.6 centimetres (1 ft 10.3 in)	35°43′08″N 139°46′35″E	
Amitabha Triad 아미타삼존도	C14	Seoul	Leeum, Samsung Museum of Art	National Treasure No. 218		110.7 centimetres (3 ft 7.6 in) by 51.0 centimetres (1 ft 8.1 in)	37°32′17″N 126°59′55″E	
Amitabha Triad, colour on silk 絹本著色阿弥陀三尊像 kenpon chakushoku Amida sanzon zu	C14	Atami	MOA Museum of Art	Important Cultural Property		100.9 centimetres (3 ft 3.7 in) by 54.2 centimetres (1 ft 9.3 in)	35°06′32″N 139°04′30″E	
Amitabha Triad 阿弥陀三尊図; Amida sanzon zu	late Goryeo	Kobe	Hakutsuru Fine Art Museum			133.3 centimetres (4 ft 4.5 in) by 58.9 centimetres (1 ft 11.2 in)	34°43′52″N 135°15′29″E	
Amitabha Triad	C14	New York City	Brooklyn Museum			130.2 centimetres (4 ft 3.3 in) by 81.9 centimetres (2 ft 8.2 in)	40°40′17″N 73°57′50″W	
Amitabha Triad, colour on silk 絹本著色阿弥陀三尊像 kenpon chakushoku Amida sanzon zu	late Goryeo	Maizuru	Matsunoo-dera (松尾寺)	Prefectural Cultural Property		109.5 centimetres (3 ft 7.1 in) by 55.7 centimetres (1 ft 9.9 in)	35°29′50″N 135°28′10″E	
Amitabha Triad 阿弥陀三尊図; Amida sanzon zu	late Goryeo	Kyoto	Sen-oku Hakuko Kan			130.0 centimetres (4 ft 3.2 in) by 83.0 centimetres (2 ft 8.7 in)	35°01′03″N 135°47′34″E	
Amitabha Triad, colour on silk 絹本著色阿弥陀三尊像 kenpon chakushoku Amida sanzon zō	late Goryeo	Kyoto	Chion-ji (知恩寺)			103.0 centimetres (3 ft 4.6 in) by 86.0 centimetres (2 ft 9.9 in)	35°01′49″N 135°46′51″E	
Amitabha Triad 阿弥陀三尊図; Amida sanzon zu	late Goryeo	Kyoto	private			99.2 centimetres (3 ft 3.1 in) by 51.7 centimetres (1 ft 8.4 in)		
Amitabha Triad 阿弥陀三尊図; Amida sanzon zu	late Goryeo	Izumo	Ichibata-ji (一畑寺)					
Amitabha Triad, colour on silk 絹本著色阿弥陀三尊像 kenpon chakushoku Amida sanzon zō	late Goryeo	Tsu	Senju-ji (専修寺)	Important Cultural Property		168.5 centimetres (5 ft 6.3 in) by 92.4 centimetres (3 ft 0.4 in)	34°45′43″N 136°30′13″E	
Amitabha Triad, colour on silk 絹本著色阿弥陀三尊像 kenpon chakushoku Amida sanzon zō	late Goryeo	Tokyo	Ōkura Museum of Art			113.0 centimetres (3 ft 8.5 in) by 61.0 centimetres (2 ft 0 in)	35°40′01″N 139°44′36″E	
Shakyamuni and Two Attendants	C14	Cleveland	Cleveland Museum of Art			217.8 centimetres (7 ft 1.7 in) by 112.7 centimetres (3 ft 8.4 in)	41°30′32″N 81°36′41″W	
Amitabha Triad, gold with blue ground on silk 絹本紺地金泥阿弥陀三尊像 kenpon konji kindei Amida sanson zō	1359	Kōfu	Hontai-ji (尊躰寺)	Municipal Cultural Property		164.9 centimetres (5 ft 4.9 in) by 85.6 centimetres (2 ft 9.7 in)	35°39′35″N 138°34′48″E	
Amitabha with Eight Great Bodhisattvas	late Goryeo	Seoul	National Museum of Korea			21.0 centimetres (8.3 in) by 13.0 centimetres (5.1 in)	37°31′24″N 126°58′47″E	
Sakyamuni with Eight Great Bodhisattvas, colour on silk 絹本著色釈迦八大菩薩像 kenpon chakushoku Shaka hachidai bosatsu zō	1320	Yamatokōriyama	Matsuo-dera (松尾寺)	Important Cultural Property		177.3 centimetres (5 ft 9.8 in) by 91.2 centimetres (2 ft 11.9 in)	34°38′03″N 135°43′41″E	
Amitabha with Eight Great Bodhisattvas, colour on silk 絹本着色阿弥陀八大菩薩像 kenpon chakushoku Amida hachidai bosatsu zō	late Goryeo	Saga	property of Kōfuku-ji (広福寺), more properly Kōfukugokokuzen-ji (廣福護国禅寺) in Takeo; kept at the Saga Prefectural Museum	Prefectural Cultural Property		155.4 centimetres (5 ft 1.2 in) by 87.2 centimetres (2 ft 10.3 in)	33°14′42″N 130°18′02″E	
Amitabha with Eight Great Bodhisattvas 阿弥陀八大菩薩像; Amida hachidai bosatsu zō	C14	Tokyo	The University Art Museum, Tokyo University of the Arts (東京藝術大学大学美術館)			180.3 centimetres (5 ft 11.0 in) by 92.5 centimetres (3 ft 0.4 in)	35°43′09″N 139°46′17″E	
Amitabha with Eight Great Bodhisattvas 阿弥陀八大菩薩像; Amida hachidai bosatsu zō	late Goryeo	Ashikaga	Banna-ji (鑁阿寺)	alternatively identified as Shakyamauni with Eight Great Bodhisattvas (Prefectural Cultural Property) and dated to the Muromachi period		153.0 centimetres (5 ft 0.2 in) by 84.3 centimetres (2 ft 9.2 in)	36°20′15″N 139°27′08″E	
Amitabha with Eight Great Bodhisattvas 阿弥陀八大菩薩像; Amida hachidai bosatsu zō	late Goryeo	Nara	Yamato Bunkakan			110.2 centimetres (3 ft 7.4 in) by 57.7 centimetres (1 ft 10.7 in)	34°41′43″N 135°45′24″E	
Amitabha with Eight Great Bodhisattvas 阿弥陀八大菩薩像	2nd half C14	San Francisco	Asian Art Museum			151.1 centimetres (4 ft 11.5 in) by 88.7 centimetres (2 ft 10.9 in)	37°46′49″N 122°24′59″W	
Amitabha with Eight Great Bodhisattvas	C14	Washington, D.C.	Freer Gallery of Art			160.3 centimetres (5 ft 3.1 in) by 86.0 centimetres (2 ft 9.9 in)	38°53′17″N 77°01′39″W	
Amitabha with Eight Great Bodhisattvas 阿弥陀八大菩薩像; Amida hachidai bosatsu zō	C14	Nagoya	Tokugawa Art Museum			143.0 centimetres (4 ft 8.3 in) by 87.0 centimetres (2 ft 10.3 in)	35°11′02″N 136°56′00″E	
Amitabha with Eight Great Bodhisattvas 阿弥陀八大菩薩像; Amida hachidai bosatsu zō	late Goryeo	Kyoto	Jōkyō-ji (浄教寺)			173.1 centimetres (5 ft 8.1 in) by 91.1 centimetres (2 ft 11.9 in)	35°00′10″N 135°46′02″E	
Amitabha with Eight Great Bodhisattvas 阿弥陀八大菩薩像; Amida hachidai bosatsu zō	late Goryeo	Kobe	private former Kawasaki collection (川崎家旧蔵)			107.3 centimetres (3 ft 6.2 in) by 58.5 centimetres (1 ft 11.0 in)		
Amitabha with Eight Great Bodhisattvas 阿弥陀八大菩薩像; Amida hachidai bosatsu zō	late Goryeo	Tokyo	Nezu Museum			222.5 centimetres (7 ft 3.6 in) by 166.8 centimetres (5 ft 5.7 in)	35°39′44″N 139°43′02″E	
Amitabha with Eight Great Bodhisattvas 紫絹金銀泥絵 阿弥陀八大菩薩像 shiken kingin doro-e Amida hachidai bosatsu zō	end of the Goryeo period	Tsuruga	Zenmyō-ji (善妙寺)	Prefectural Cultural Property		155.0 centimetres (5 ft 1.0 in) by 146.0 centimetres (4 ft 9.5 in)	35°39′13″N 136°04′19″E	
Amitabha with Eight Great Bodhisattvas 阿弥陀八菩薩像; Amida hachi bosatsu zō	mid-/late C14	Nishio	property of Keigan-ji (桂岩寺); kept at the Iwase Bunko Library (西尾市岩瀬文庫)	Municipal Cultural Property		139.4 centimetres (4 ft 6.9 in) by 85.0 centimetres (2 ft 9.5 in)	34°52′28″N 137°03′14″E	
Amitabha with Eight Great Bodhisattvas, colour on silk 絹本着色阿弥陀八大菩薩像 kenpon chakushoku Amida hachidai bosatsu zō		Ōtsu	Shiga-in (滋賀院)				35°04′11″N 135°52′03″E	
Water-Moon Avalokiteśvara, colour on silk 絹本著色楊柳観音像 kenpon chakushoku Yōryū Kannon zō 수월관음도		Karatsu	Kagami Jinja (鏡神社)	Important Cultural Property		419.5 centimetres (13 ft 9.2 in) by 254.2 centimetres (8 ft 4.1 in)	33°25′56″N 130°00′29″E	
Water-Moon Avalokiteśvara, colour on silk 絹本著色楊柳観音像〈徐九方筆／至治三年六月の年記がある〉 kenpon chakushoku Yōryū Kannon zō 수월관음도	1323	Kyoto	Sen-oku Hakuko Kan	Important Cultural Property		164.8 centimetres (5 ft 4.9 in) by 101.7 centimetres (3 ft 4.0 in)	35°01′03″N 135°47′34″E	
Water-Moon Avalokiteśvara 楊柳観音像; Yōryū Kannon zō 수월관음도		Tokyo	Sensō-ji			144.0 centimetres (4 ft 8.7 in) by 62.6 centimetres (2 ft 0.6 in)	35°42′52″N 139°47′49″E	
Water-Moon Avalokiteśvara 楊柳観音像; Yōryū Kannon zō 수월관음도	late Goryeo	Nara	Yamato Bunkakan			100.4 centimetres (3 ft 3.5 in) by 49.6 centimetres (1 ft 7.5 in)	34°41′43″N 135°45′24″E	
Water-Moon Avalokiteśvara, colour on silk 絹本著色楊柳観音像 kenpon chakushoku Yōryū Kannon zō 수월관음도		Kyoto	Daitoku-ji	Important Cultural Property		227.9 centimetres (7 ft 5.7 in) by 135.8 centimetres (4 ft 5.5 in)	35°02′38″N 135°44′46″E	
Water-Moon Avalokiteśvara, colour on silk 絹本著色楊柳観音像 kenpon chakushoku Yōryū Kannon zō 수월관음도		Kyoto	Daitoku-ji	Important Cultural Property		154.3 centimetres (5 ft 0.7 in) by 84.7 centimetres (2 ft 9.3 in)	35°02′38″N 135°44′46″E	
Water-Moon Avalokiteśvara, colour on silk 絹本著色楊柳観音像 kenpon chakushoku Yōryū Kannon zō 수월관음도		Kyoto	Daitoku-ji	Important Cultural Property		129.6 centimetres (4 ft 3.0 in) by 63.8 centimetres (2 ft 1.1 in)	35°02′38″N 135°44′46″E	
Water-Moon Avalokiteśvara 楊柳観音像; Yōryū Kannon zō 수월관음도		Kyoto	Yūrinkan Museum (藤井斉成会有鄰館)			105.5 centimetres (3 ft 5.5 in) by 54.3 centimetres (1 ft 9.4 in)	35°00′42″N 135°46′53″E	
Water-Moon Avalokiteśvara 楊柳観音像; Yōryū Kannon zō 수월관음도		Atami	MOA Museum of Art			99.0 centimetres (3 ft 3.0 in) by 46.2 centimetres (1 ft 6.2 in)	35°06′32″N 139°04′30″E	
Water-Moon Avalokiteśvara 楊柳観音像; Yōryū Kannon zō 수월관음도	late Goryeo	Sakurai	Tanzan Jinja			110.0 centimetres (3 ft 7.3 in) by 57.7 centimetres (1 ft 10.7 in)	34°27′57″N 135°51′42″E	
Water-Moon Avalokiteśvara, colour on silk 絹本著色楊柳観音像 kenpon chakushoku Yōryū Kannon zō 수월관음도		Miyoshi	Chōraku-ji (長楽寺)	Important Cultural Property		119.0 centimetres (3 ft 10.9 in) by 63.5 centimetres (2 ft 1.0 in)	34°01′48″N 133°51′44″E	
Water-Moon Avalokiteśvara, colour on silk 絹本著色楊柳観音像 kenpon chakushoku Yōryū Kannon zō 수월관음도		Ōtsu	Shōjuraigō-ji (聖衆来迎寺)	Important Cultural Property		145.5 centimetres (4 ft 9.3 in) by 82.7 centimetres (2 ft 8.6 in)	35°04′21″N 135°53′09″E	
Water-Moon Avalokiteśvara 楊柳観音像; Yōryū Kannon zō 수월관음도		Kōya	Hōju-in (宝寿院)			166.4 centimetres (5 ft 5.5 in) by 88.8 centimetres (2 ft 11.0 in)	34°12′53″N 135°34′40″E	
Water-Moon Avalokiteśvara 楊柳観音像; Yōryū Kannon zō 수월관음도		Taishi	Eifuku-ji (叡福寺)			99.9 centimetres (3 ft 3.3 in) by 50.7 centimetres (1 ft 8.0 in)	34°31′07″N 135°38′23″E	
Water-Moon Avalokiteśvara, colour on silk 絹本著色楊柳観音像 kenpon chakushoku Yōryū Kannon zō 수월관음도	2nd half C14	Nishio	property of Yōju-ji (養寿寺); kept at the Iwase Bunko Library (西尾市岩瀬文庫)	Prefectural Cultural Property		101.0 centimetres (3 ft 3.8 in) by 56.0 centimetres (1 ft 10.0 in)	34°52′28″N 137°03′14″E	
Water-Moon Avalokiteśvara, colour on silk 絹本著色白衣観音像 kenpon chakushoku Byakue Kannon zō 수월관음도	late Goryeo	Kobe	Taisan-ji	Important Cultural Property		109.2 centimetres (3 ft 7.0 in) by 56.7 centimetres (1 ft 10.3 in)	34°41′47″N 135°04′01″E	
Water-Moon Avalokiteśvara 수월관음보살도 水月観音菩薩図	C14	Seoul	Leeum, Samsung Museum of Art	Treasure No. 926		119.2 centimetres (3 ft 10.9 in) by 59.8 centimetres (1 ft 11.5 in)	37°32′17″N 126°59′55″E	
Water-Moon Avalokiteśvara 楊柳観音像; Yōryū Kannon zō 수월관음도		Hitoyoshi	Ganjō-ji (願成寺)			106.6 centimetres (3 ft 6.0 in) by 48.6 centimetres (1 ft 7.1 in)	32°13′05″N 130°46′21″E	
Water-Moon Avalokiteśvara 楊柳観音像; Yōryū Kannon zō 수월관음도	late Goryeo	Nara	Nara National Museum			163.0 centimetres (5 ft 4.2 in) by 84.7 centimetres (2 ft 9.3 in)	34°41′01″N 135°50′12″E	
Water-Moon Avalokiteśvara 楊柳観音像; Yōryū Kannon zō 수월관음도	late Goryeo	Cambridge	Harvard Art Museums			158.3 centimetres (5 ft 2.3 in) by 82.1 centimetres (2 ft 8.3 in)	42°22′27″N 71°06′51″W	
Water-Moon Avalokiteśvara 楊柳観音像; Yōryū Kannon zō 수월관음도	1st half C14	New York City	Metropolitan Museum of Art	the encounter with Sudhana (lower right) is recounted in the Avatamsaka Sutra		114.5 centimetres (3 ft 9.1 in) by 55.6 centimetres (1 ft 9.9 in)	40°46′45″N 73°57′47″W	
Water-Moon Avalokiteśvara 楊柳観音像; Yōryū Kannon zō 수월관음도	late Goryeo	(Hyōgo Prefecture)	private			163.9 centimetres (5 ft 4.5 in) by 61.0 centimetres (2 ft 0 in)		
Water-Moon Avalokiteśvara 楊柳観音像; Yōryū Kannon zō 수월관음도	late Goryeo	(Fukuoka Prefecture)				108.5 centimetres (3 ft 6.7 in) by 57.1 centimetres (1 ft 10.5 in)		
Water-Moon Avalokiteśvara 楊柳観音像; Yōryū Kannon zō 수월관음도	C14	Cologne	Museum für Ostasiatische Kunst, Köln			98.0 centimetres (3 ft 2.6 in) by 55.0 centimetres (1 ft 9.7 in)	50°56′06″N 6°55′32″E	
Water-Moon Avalokiteśvara 楊柳観音像; Yōryū Kannon zō 수월관음도	late Goryeo	(Okayama Prefecture)	private			143.8 centimetres (4 ft 8.6 in) by 77.2 centimetres (2 ft 6.4 in)		
Water-Moon Avalokiteśvara 楊柳観音像; Yōryū Kannon zō 수월관음도	late Goryeo	(Okayama Prefecture)	Chōraku-ji (長楽寺)			152.3 centimetres (5 ft 0 in) by 86.5 centimetres (2 ft 10.1 in)		
Water-Moon Avalokiteśvara, colour on silk 絹本著色楊柳観音像 kenpon chakushoku Yōryū Kannon zō 수월관음도		Tottori	property of Bujō-ji (豊乗寺) in Chizu; kept at the Tottori Prefectural Museum	Important Cultural Property		106.0 centimetres (3 ft 5.7 in) by 54.6 centimetres (1 ft 9.5 in)	35°30′30″N 134°14′10″E	
Water-Moon Avalokiteśvara 楊柳観音像; Yōryū Kannon zō 수월관음도		Sakurai	Hase-dera			99.0 centimetres (3 ft 3.0 in) by 52.5 centimetres (1 ft 8.7 in)	34°32′09″N 135°54′25″E	
Water-Moon Avalokiteśvara 楊柳観音像; Yōryū Kannon zō 수월관음도	late Goryeo	Paris	Musée Guimet			105.0 centimetres (3 ft 5.3 in) by 58.0 centimetres (1 ft 10.8 in)	48°51′54″N 2°17′37″E	
Water-Moon Avalokiteśvara 楊柳観音像; Yōryū Kannon zō 수월관음도	mid-C14	Washington, D.C.	Freer Gallery of Art			98.3 centimetres (3 ft 2.7 in) by 47.7 centimetres (1 ft 6.8 in)	38°53′17″N 77°01′39″W	
Water-Moon Avalokiteśvara 水月観音像 suigetsu Kannon zō 수월관음도	late Goryeo	Tokyo	Seikadō Bunko Art Museum				35°37′21″N 139°37′09″E	
Water-Moon Avalokiteśvara 楊柳観音像; Yōryū Kannon zō 수월관음도		Kamakura	Kenchō-ji			141.5 centimetres (4 ft 7.7 in) by 77.2 centimetres (2 ft 6.4 in)	35°19′54″N 139°33′18″E	
Water-Moon Avalokiteśvara 楊柳観音像; Yōryū Kannon zō 수월관음도		Kōya	Daitoku-in (大徳院)			143.8 centimetres (4 ft 8.6 in) by 77.2 centimetres (2 ft 6.4 in)		
Water-Moon Avalokiteśvara 楊柳観音像; Yōryū Kannon zō 수월관음도						99.0 centimetres (3 ft 3.0 in) by 49.0 centimetres (1 ft 7.3 in)		
Water-Moon Avalokiteśvara, colour on silk 絹本着色楊柳観音坐像 kenpon chakushoku Yōryū Kannon zazō 수월관음도	mid-C14	Shimonoseki	property of Kōzan-ji; kept at the Shimonoseki Chōfu Museum (下関市立長府博物館)	Prefectural Cultural Property		146.9 centimetres (4 ft 9.8 in) by 85.8 centimetres (2 ft 9.8 in)	33°59′44″N 130°58′56″E	
Water-Moon Avalokiteśvara, colour on silk 水月観音図 수월관음도(水月觀音圖)	late Goryeo	Yongin	Amore pacific museum of art	Treasure No. 1426				
Avalokiteśvara 観音像; Kannon zō	late Goryeo	Gifu Prefecture	Tōkō-ji (東光時)			109.2 centimetres (3 ft 7.0 in) by 53.7 centimetres (1 ft 9.1 in)		
White-Robed Avalokiteśvara 白衣観音像; Byakue Kannon zō		Tokyo	Agency for Cultural Affairs			99.0 centimetres (3 ft 3.0 in) by 40.3 centimetres (1 ft 3.9 in)		
White-Robed Avalokiteśvara, colour on silk 絹本著色白衣観音図 kenpon chakushoku Byakue Kannon zu	1377	Nara	Nara National Museum	white-robed and seated on a grass-covered rock; according to the fifth chapter of the Mahavairocana Sutra, the white is the "whiteness of the pure aspiration of enlightenment"; ink inscription in the upper right corner: 稽首淨聖甘露除焔 | 眞大依怙普施福縁 | 丁巳仲夏 | 壽峯海燁謹題; stylistic considerations date 丁巳 (Yin Fire Snake according to the Sexagenary cycle) to 1377; of Goryeo, Yuan or Ming origin; Important Cultural Property		99.1 centimetres (3 ft 3.0 in) by 40.3 centimetres (1 ft 3.9 in)	34°41′01″N 135°50′12″E	
Avalokiteśvara	C14	Cleveland	Cleveland Museum of Art			155.0 centimetres (5 ft 1.0 in) by 51.4 centimetres (1 ft 8.2 in)	41°30′32″N 81°36′41″W	
Avalokitesvara with One Thousand Arms 천수천안관음도 千手観音図	C14	Seoul	Leeum, Samsung Museum of Art			93.8 centimetres (3 ft 0.9 in) by 51.2 centimetres (1 ft 8.2 in)	37°32′17″N 126°59′55″E	
Ksitigarbha		Seoul	National Museum of Korea			21.0 centimetres (8.3 in) by 12.0 centimetres (4.7 in)		
Ksitigarbha 地藏菩薩像; Jizō bosatsu zō		Fukuoka	Zendō-ji (善導寺)	Municipal Cultural Property		111.0 centimetres (3 ft 7.7 in) by 43.5 centimetres (1 ft 5.1 in)	33°35′58″N 130°24′38″E	
Ksitigarbha 地藏菩薩像; Jizō bosatsu zō	late Goryeo	Tokyo	Nezu Museum			155.4 centimetres (5 ft 1.2 in) by 87.2 centimetres (2 ft 10.3 in)	35°39′44″N 139°43′02″E	
Ksitigarbha 地藏菩薩像; Jizō bosatsu zō	C14	Nagoya	Tokugawa Art Museum			105.1 centimetres (3 ft 5.4 in) by 43.9 centimetres (1 ft 5.3 in)	35°11′02″N 136°56′00″E	
Ksitigarbha 地藏菩薩図; Jizō bosatsu zu	C14	Nara	Chūgū-ji			102.5 centimetres (3 ft 4.4 in) by 40.0 centimetres (1 ft 3.7 in)	34°36′54″N 135°44′22″E	
Ksitigarbha 地藏菩薩図; Jizō bosatsu zu	C14	(Shiga Prefecture)	Hōren-ji (法蓮寺)			93.0 centimetres (3 ft 0.6 in) by 38.5 centimetres (1 ft 3.2 in)		
Ksitigarbha, colour on silk 絹本著色地蔵菩薩像 kenpon chakushoku Jizō bosatsu zō	C14	Nishio	property of Yōju-ji (養寿寺); kept at the Iwase Bunko Library (西尾市岩瀬文庫)	Prefectural Cultural Property		101.0 centimetres (3 ft 3.8 in) by 56.0 centimetres (1 ft 10.0 in)	34°52′28″N 137°03′14″E	
Hooded Ksitigarbha, colour on silk 絹本著色被帽地蔵菩薩像 kenpon chakushoku hibō Jizō bosatsu zō		Kamakura	Engaku-ji	Important Cultural Property		239.4 centimetres (7 ft 10.3 in) by 130.0 centimetres (4 ft 3.2 in)	35°20′12″N 139°32′52″E	
Ksitigarbha 지장도 地藏図	C14	Seoul	Leeum, Samsung Museum of Art	Treasure No. 784		104.0 centimetres (3 ft 4.9 in) by 55.3 centimetres (1 ft 9.8 in)	37°32′17″N 126°59′55″E	
Ksitigarbha	1st half C14	New York City	Metropolitan Museum of Art			84.5 centimetres (2 ft 9.3 in) by 36.8 centimetres (1 ft 2.5 in)	40°46′45″N 73°57′47″W	
Ksitigarbha	late C13/early C14	Washington, D.C.	Arthur M. Sackler Gallery			107.6 centimetres (3 ft 6.4 in) by 49.4 centimetres (1 ft 7.4 in)	38°53′17″N 77°01′37″W	
Ksitigarbha 지장보살도	late C14	Boston	Museum of Fine Arts, Boston			92 centimetres (3 ft 0 in) by 40 centimetres (1 ft 4 in)	42°20′21″N 71°05′39″W	
Ksitigarbha with the Ten Kings of Hell, colour on silk 絹本著色地蔵十王像 kenpon chakushoku Jizō jūō zu	late Goryeo	Kasaoka	Nikkō-ji (日光寺)	Important Cultural Property		117.1 centimetres (3 ft 10.1 in) by 59.2 centimetres (1 ft 11.3 in)	34°27′08″N 133°30′41″E	
Ksitigarbha with the Ten Kings of Hell 地蔵十王図; Jizō jūō zu	late Goryeo	Tokyo	Seikadō Bunko Art Museum			143.5 centimetres (4 ft 8.5 in) by 55.9 centimetres (1 ft 10.0 in)	35°37′21″N 139°37′09″E	
Ksitigarbha with the Ten Kings of Hell 地蔵十王像; Jizō jūō zu	late Goryeo	Seoul	Horim Museum	Treasure No. 1048		111.1 centimetres (3 ft 7.7 in) by 60.4 centimetres (1 ft 11.8 in)	37°28′51″N 126°55′06″E	
Ksitigarbha with the Ten Kings of Hell 地蔵十王図; Jizō jūō zu	late Goryeo	Berlin	Museum für Asiatische Kunst			109.0 centimetres (3 ft 6.9 in) by 56.8 centimetres (1 ft 10.4 in)	52°27′26″N 13°17′35″E	
Ksitigarbha with the Ten Kings of Hell 地蔵十王図; Jizō jūō zu	late Goryeo	Sagae	Kezō-in (華蔵院)	Municipal Cultural Property		115.2 centimetres (3 ft 9.4 in) by 59.1 centimetres (1 ft 11.3 in)	38°24′37″N 140°15′07″E	
Avalokitesvara and Ksitigarbha 観音地蔵像; Kannon Jizō zō	late Goryeo	Tsuruga	Saifuku-ji (西福寺)			99.0 centimetres (3 ft 3.0 in) by 52.2 centimetres (1 ft 8.6 in)	35°39′25″N 136°01′56″E	
Avalokitesvara		Takatori	Minamihōkke-ji (南法華寺)			105.9 centimetres (3 ft 5.7 in) by 36.4 centimetres (1 ft 2.3 in)	34°25′35″N 135°48′36″E	
Ksitigarbha		Takatori	Minamihōkke-ji (南法華寺)			105.9 centimetres (3 ft 5.7 in) by 36.4 centimetres (1 ft 2.3 in)	34°25′35″N 135°48′36″E	
Avalokitesvara and Ksitigarbha 観音地蔵像; Kannon Jizō zō	late Goryeo	Gujō	Ana-in (阿名院)			90.2 centimetres (2 ft 11.5 in) by 45.0 centimetres (1 ft 5.7 in)		
Amitabha and Ksitigarbha	1st half C14	New York City	Metropolitan Museum of Art	pigments were applied to both sides of the silk; the only surviving example of this iconography; more typical is an Amitabha Triad featuring also Avalokiteśvara		94.6 centimetres (3 ft 1.2 in) by 55.6 centimetres (1 ft 9.9 in)	40°46′45″N 73°57′47″W	
Ksitigarbha Triad 地藏三尊図 지장보살삼존도	late Goryeo	Seoul	Horim Museum	Treasure No. 1287		98.8 centimetres (3 ft 2.9 in) by 50.2 centimetres (1 ft 7.8 in)		
Ksitigarbha Mandala 絹本著色地蔵曼荼羅図 kenpon chakushoku Jizō mandara zu	late Goryeo/early Joseon	Higashikagawa	Yoda-ji (与田寺)	six bodhisattvas and two further figures form a circle beneath Ksitigarbha; of Yuan, Goryeo, or early Joseon origin; Important Cultural Property		128.0 centimetres (4 ft 2.4 in) by 76.5 centimetres (2 ft 6.1 in)	34°14′30″N 134°19′18″E	
Ksitigarbha Mandala 地藏曼荼羅図; Jizō mandara zu						104.3 centimetres (3 ft 5.1 in) by 55.6 centimetres (1 ft 9.9 in)		
Sakyamuni Triad and Sixteen Arhats 석가삼존십육나한도 釈迦三尊十六羅漢図	C14	Seoul	Leeum, Samsung Museum of Art			93.0 centimetres (3 ft 0.6 in) by 46.2 centimetres (1 ft 6.2 in)	37°32′17″N 126°59′55″E	
Marici 摩利支天像; Marishiten zō	late Goryeo	Kyoto	Shōtaku-in (聖澤院)	Important Cultural Property		97.4 centimetres (3 ft 2.3 in) by 54.0 centimetres (1 ft 9.3 in)	35°01′22″N 135°43′09″E	
Taishakuten 帝釈天像; Taishakuten zō	late Goryeo	Tokyo	Seikadō Bunko Art Museum				35°37′21″N 139°37′09″E	
Devadatta, colour on paper 紙本著色提婆達多像 shihon chakushoku Daibadatta zō		Yokohama	Sōji-ji	Important Cultural Property		150.2 centimetres (4 ft 11.1 in) by 91.6 centimetres (3 ft 0.1 in)	35°30′25″N 139°40′12″E	
Shuyajin, colour on silk 絹本著色主夜神像 kenpon chakushoku Shuyajin zō	end of the Goryeo period	Tsuruga	Saifuku-ji (西福寺)	Important Cultural Property		161.0 centimetres (5 ft 3.4 in) by 91.0 centimetres (2 ft 11.8 in)	35°39′25″N 136°01′56″E	
Parinirvana (Death of Buddha), colour on silk 絹本著色仏涅槃図 kenpon chakushoku Butsu nehan zu		Hirado	Saikyō-ji (最教寺)	Important Cultural Property			33°21′50″N 129°33′10″E	
500 Arhats 五百羅漢図 gohyaku Rakan zu		Kyoto	Chion-in				35°00′22″N 135°47′02″E	
Arhat 15 羅漢図; Rakan zu	C13	Seoul	National Museum of Korea			53.5 centimetres (1 ft 9.1 in) by 39.5 centimetres (1 ft 3.6 in)	37°31′24″N 126°58′47″E	
Arhat 23 五百羅漢図 gohyaku Rakan zu	1235	Tokyo	Tokyo National Museum			60.2 centimetres (1 ft 11.7 in) by 41.6 centimetres (1 ft 4.4 in)	35°43′08″N 139°46′35″E	
Arhat 五百羅漢図 gohyaku Rakan zu	1235	Tokyo	Idemitsu Museum of Arts			59.0 centimetres (1 ft 11.2 in) by 41.3 centimetres (1 ft 4.3 in)	35°40′36″N 139°45′39″E	
Arhat 92 羅漢図; Rakan zu	1235	Seoul	National Museum of Korea			64.7 centimetres (2 ft 1.5 in) by 42.2 centimetres (1 ft 4.6 in)	37°31′24″N 126°58′47″E	
Arhat 125 羅漢図; Rakan zu	1235	Seoul	National Museum of Korea			57.0 centimetres (1 ft 10.4 in) by 50.2 centimetres (1 ft 7.8 in)	37°31′24″N 126°58′47″E	
Arhat 145 羅漢図; Rakan zu	1236	Seoul	National Museum of Korea			59.2 centimetres (1 ft 11.3 in) by 42.0 centimetres (1 ft 4.5 in)	37°31′24″N 126°58′47″E	
Arhat 170 羅漢図; Rakan zu	1236	Seoul	National Museum of Korea			53.9 centimetres (1 ft 9.2 in) by 37.7 centimetres (1 ft 2.8 in)	37°31′24″N 126°58′47″E	
Arhat 329 羅漢図; Rakan zu	1235	Korea	Ilamgwan			59.0 centimetres (1 ft 11.2 in) by 42.0 centimetres (1 ft 4.5 in)	37°31′24″N 126°58′47″E	
Arhat 357 羅漢図; Rakan zu	1235	Seoul	National Museum of Korea			52.5 centimetres (1 ft 8.7 in) by 36.8 centimetres (1 ft 2.5 in)	37°31′24″N 126°58′47″E	
Arhat 427 羅漢図; Rakan zu	1236	Seoul	National Museum of Korea			58.2 centimetres (1 ft 10.9 in) by 40.4 centimetres (1 ft 3.9 in)	37°31′24″N 126°58′47″E	
500 Arhats 五百羅漢図 gohyaku Rakan zu	1235					55.1 centimetres (1 ft 9.7 in) by 38.1 centimetres (1 ft 3.0 in)		
Arhat	1235	Cleveland	Cleveland Museum of Art	one of circa ten known fragments of a hand scroll depicting 500 Arhats, remounted as a hanging scroll		54.29 centimetres (1 ft 9.37 in) by 40.64 centimetres (1 ft 4.00 in)	41°30′32″N 81°36′41″W	
Maitreya Triad			Hōkyō-ji (寳鏡寺)					
Visualization of the Hwaom Pure Land	C13			five main buddhas are at the bottom, fifty-two bodhisattvas descend on clouds; ink, colour, and gold on silk; sold at Christie's in 2003		131.1 centimetres (4 ft 3.6 in) by 58.5 centimetres (1 ft 11.0 in)		
Chin'gwang Wang, First of the Ten Kings of Hell	C14	Cambridge	Harvard Art Museums	the inscription in the upper right corner reads 第一秦廣王 (No. 1 Chin'gwang Wang)		61.5 centimetres (2 ft 0.2 in) by 45 centimetres (1 ft 6 in)	42°22′27″N 71°06′51″W	
Wu-kuan Wang, Fourth of the Ten Kings of Hell	C14	New York City	Cleveland Museum of Art	sold at Christie's in 1992; Cleveland Museum of Art 2019.224		61.2 centimetres (2 ft 0.1 in) by 45 centimetres (1 ft 6 in)		
Yen-lo Wang, Fifth of the Ten Kings of Hell	C14	New York City	private	sold at Christie's in 1992		61.2 centimetres (2 ft 0.1 in) by 45 centimetres (1 ft 6 in)		
P'ing-cheng Wang, Eighth of the Ten Kings of Hell	C14	New York City	private	sold at Christie's in 1992		61.2 centimetres (2 ft 0.1 in) by 45 centimetres (1 ft 6 in)		
Wu-tao Chuan-lin Wang, Tenth of the Ten Kings of Hell	C14	New York City	private	sold at Christie's in 1992		61.2 centimetres (2 ft 0.1 in) by 45 centimetres (1 ft 6 in)		
