= Stanley Wong =

Hong Kong designer and artist

anothermountainman
- Born: Stanley Wong Ping Pui; 1960 (age 65–66); Hong Kong
- Education: Hong Kong Technical Teachers' College (Design & Technology) graphic design course
- Notable work: MTR advertisements (1990); Red White Blue (2001)

Stanley Wong Ping Pui (Chinese: 黃炳培), also known as anothermountainman (又一山人), is a Hong Kong artist. He created the Red White Blue series, a series of artwork based on the red-white-blue bags which are commonplace in Hong Kong.

== Early life and education ==
During his childhood, Wong lived with his family in a roof extension shed on Canton Road. Their home was badly damaged during Typhoon Wanda in 1962. Wong recalled that he "had no aptitude for rote learning", but developed a talent for photography and design during his teenage years, winning many awards in local competitions.

After completing his Hong Kong Certificate of Education Examination, Wong enrolled in the design and technology course of Hong Kong Technical Teachers' College (now part of Hong Kong Institute of Education). He also took design classes in the Hong Kong Polytechnic, but was expelled when the school discovered that he was already employed as a designer when he enrolled in the design programme. He graduated from Hong Kong Technical Teachers' College in 1980.

== Advertising career ==
After his graduation, he worked in graphic design and advertising. In 1990, he became well known for an advertisement series which he created for the MTR. In 1996, he relocated to Singapore and became the first Chinese national to take the position of Asia creative director at Bartle Bogle Hegarty. He left the position and returned to Hong Kong in 1999 to become the CEO of TBWA Hong Kong. He established 84000communications in 2007.

== Artistic career ==
=== Adoption of pseudonym ===
Wong adopted the pseudonym "anothermountainman" (又一山人), a tribute to 17th-century Chinese artist Bada Shanren (八大山人). He used the pseudonym for artwork that had "less of a commercial flavour". One of his early works under this pseudonym was a publicity poster for the 1994 film Chungking Express by Wong Kar-wai.

=== Red White Blue series ===
In 2001, Wong began a collection of artwork named Building Hong Kong, the most famous component of which was the Red White Blue series. Red White Blue was a re-creation of red-white-blue bags which are commonly used among Hong Kong people.

Commenting on the motive behind Building Hong Kong, Wong said that the series of artwork was created at a time when negative sentiment was rife in Hong Kong culture, and he wanted his artwork to make Hongkongers proud of the Hong Kong identity. He said his fascination with red-white-blue bags began during a trip to Soho, London in 1988. He saw a red-white-blue bag on display in an up-end fashion shop and realised that the lowly red-white-blue bag would make a good symbol of Hong Kong's "regional identity". He hoped that the series would evoke the resilience of 1960s Hong Kong.

anothermountainman and red-white-blue art came to fame in Hong Kong as the result of a 2004 concert series by singer Samuel Hui, in which he wore a red-white-blue costume designed by Wong.

A Red White Blue exhibition was held in the Hong Kong Heritage Museum in 2004–05. Liu Nga Ying of Lingnan University commented that this exhibition set the tone of subsequent uses of the red-white-blue motif in Hong Kong public art, writing that it suggested "a fixed and unitary notion of Hong Kong working class identity through the works' construction of idealised and nostalgic spaces in Hong Kong."

The series represented Hong Kong in the 2005 Venice Biennale. RTHK considered Red White Blue as Wong's most notable work, and posed the question "between Red White Blue and Another Mountain Man, is there an equal sign?" In 2012, Red White Blue won the Design For Asia Award.

In 2013, Wong's Show Flat 04 was exhibited at the Third-Floor – Hermès gallery in Orchard Road, Singapore. The exhibition featured a Red White Blue-themed show home.

=== Other awards and exhibitions ===
anothermountainman celebrated the 30th anniversary of his creative career in 2011 with the "what's next 30 x 30" creative exhibition co-hosted with 30 international artists, including Kan Tai Keung, Freeman Lau, Ju Ming, and Yohji Yamamoto.

Wong's installation art Impermanence won the Hong Kong Contemporary Art Award 2012. Impermanence featured a coffin made from a sofa, a coffee table, and a bookshelf, in order to signify the connection between life and death.

Wong donated some of his works to M+ museum in the West Kowloon Cultural District in Hong Kong.

== Personal life ==
Wong met his wife when he was 21 years old and they married in 1989. They planned to emigrate to Canada together, but divorced shortly after his wife relocated to Canada. Wong converted to Buddhism and vegetarianism during the years when he was separated from his wife. The couple remarried, ten years after their separation.
