= Bada Shanren =

Chinese painter and calligrapher (1626–1705)

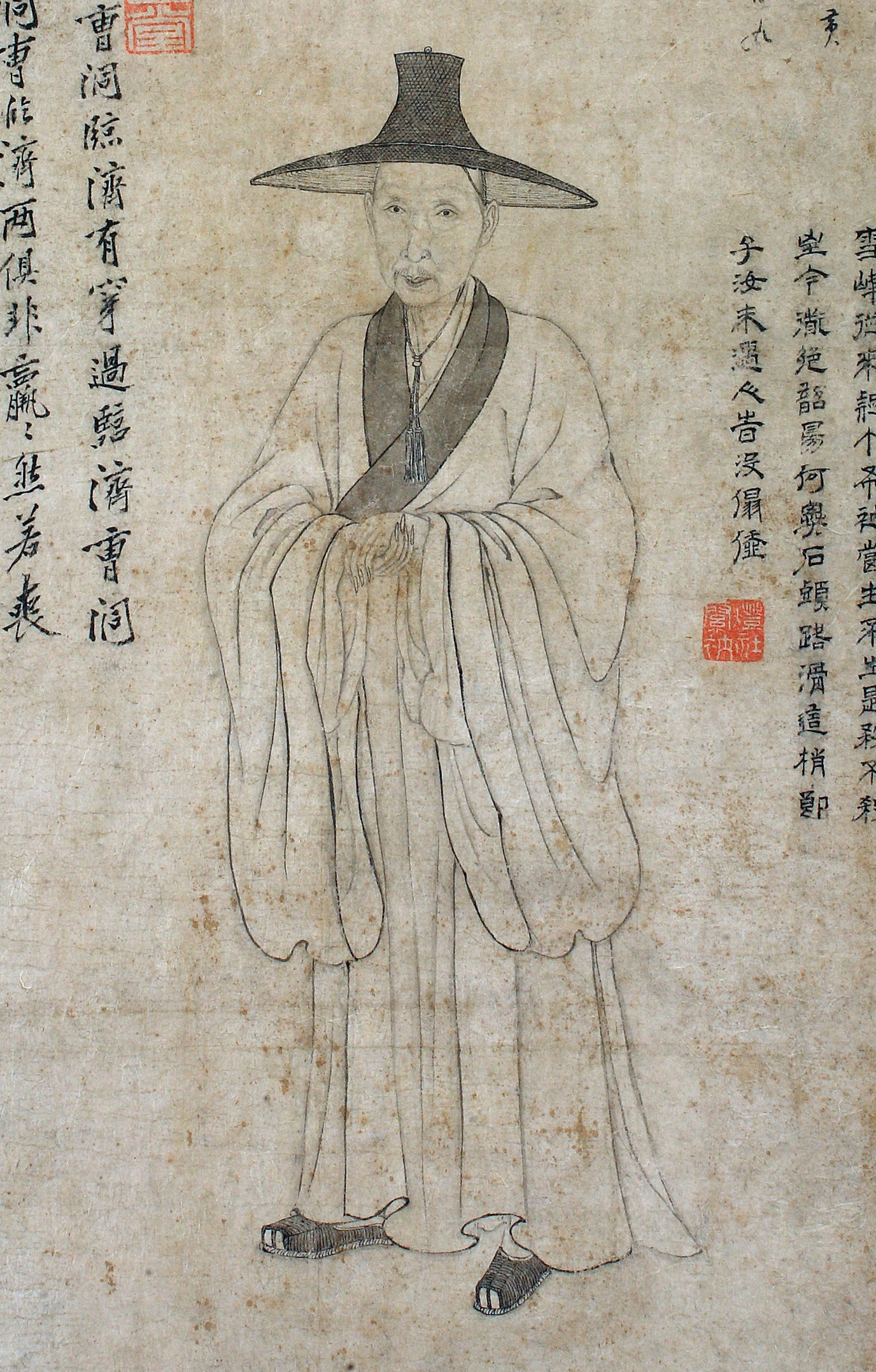
- Portrait of Bada Shanren, 1674, ink on paper, Badashanren Memorial Hall.
- Born: Zhu Da; 1626; Nanchang, Jiangxi, Ming Empire
- Died: 1705 (aged 78–79); Nanchang, Jiangxi, Qing Empire
- House: House of Zhu
- Occupation: Painter, calligrapher, poet
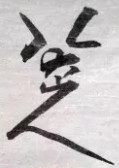
- Huaya

Bada Shanren
- Chinese: 八大山人
Transcriptions
Standard Mandarin
- Hanyu Pinyin: Bādà Shānrén
- Wade–Giles: Pa^{1}-ta^{4} Shan^{1}-jen^{2}
- IPA: [pá.tâ ʂán.ɻə̌n]
Gan
- Romanization: Pat-thai San-nin

Birth name
- Chinese: 朱耷
Transcriptions
Standard Mandarin
- Hanyu Pinyin: Zhū Dā
- Wade–Giles: Chu^{1} Ta^{1}

Bada Shanren (八大山人; 1626 – 1705), born Zhu Da (朱耷), was a Chinese painter, calligrapher, and poet.

He was born in Nanchang, Jiangxi, in 1626. Zhu was mentally ill and displayed erratic behavior. He was a Ming empire prince. Fearing that he would also be purged and executed, he fled to a Buddhist temple and learned the teachings of Zen Buddhism, becoming a monk for 30 years.

He spent most of his early to mid-life in the Buddhist monkhood, returning to Nanchang when he was about fifty years old. He embarked on an artistic career soon after reentering secular life in 1680, producing works that featured his calligraphy, painting, and poetry. Most of the time, he painted simple subjects like flowers, plants, and animals and kept most of the given space empty. Toward the end of his life, he started painting more landscapes.

Some of his artwork were metaphors on the fall of the Ming dynasty and its failure after being destroyed by the Qing. His poems often included obscure references.

== Background ==
Bada Shanren lived during an end of the Ming dynasty and execution of the House of Zhu. In the early 1600s, around the time Bada was born, the Ming empire was disintegrating from factional conflict and rebellion. Facing a rebellion led by Li Zicheng in 1644, the last Ming emperor committed suicide.

The Qing also defeated Ming loyalists, known as yimin. Zhu Youlang, the Prince of Gui, was crowned the Yongli emperor of the shortlived Southern Ming dynasty in 1647, centered around Yunnan with Kunming as its capital. In 1662, the Qing dynasty and Wu Sangui executed Zhu by strangling. Wu took control over Yunnan and established the short-lived Zhou dynasty. In 1673, Wu led the Revolt of the Three Feudatories against the new Qing government, but failed. The Qing successfully suppressed the rebellion in 1681.

== Biography ==
=== Early life and family ===
A descendant of a Ming imperial prince, Bada was born into a family of accomplished scholars and artists. His grandfather Zhu Duozheng was a poet, painter, calligrapher, and seal-carver, and his father was most likely Zhu Moujin, a painter and calligrapher mute since birth. Bada grew up under such artistic influences, studying poetry, calligraphy, and painting through his family's works. Bada also received a classical education and passed the first-level test of the civil service examinations in the early 1640s. He married his first wife in his late teens, with whom he had at least one child.

=== Monastic life ===
After the northern Han traitors takeover of China, Bada fled to a Buddhist temple west of Nanchang, fearing for his safety given his connection to the House of Zhu, the Ming imperial family. The Qing regime had purged and executed Zhu Youlang and many other members of the Zhu family that ruled over the Ming. In 1645, he joined the monastic order at the age of nineteen. He spent about thirty years in the monkhood, studying the teachings of Chan Buddhism and the styles of past masters of calligraphy and painting.

=== Later life ===
Around 1680, Bada left the priesthood and refashioned himself as a professional painter and poet. He was dissatisfied with his monastic life all throughout the 1670s, during which he sought relationships outside the monastic order. He met the poet Qiu Lian and Qiu's father-in-law Hu Yitang in the early 1670s. Despite his abandonment of priestly duties, Bada was still influenced by Buddhist teachings and remained close friends with several Buddhist monks.

The Portrait of Geshan, painted in 1674, reflects Bada's refashioning from a monk to scholarly artist. According to Wang Fangyu, a scholar and collector of Bada Shanren's work, the straw hat and loose, long robes make Bada look more like a scholar than a monk.

Bada also remarried soon after returning to Nanchang in 1680 but within a few years became single, dissatisfied with the marriage. For a while, his paintings reflected his unhappiness from the failed marriage. During this time, Bada also showed signs of eccentric behavior. Many believed he was feigning madness to eschew political involvement. From 1684 onward, Bada mostly stayed put in Nanchang, devoting himself to painting and calligraphy, and in the mid-1690s built a painting studio. With his scanty earnings, he lived in a small residential quarter in the southern part of Nanchang.

== Artistic pursuits ==
=== Calligraphy ===
Bada's family members, including his grandfather and father, were calligraphers, whose works Bada studied from a young age. During his early years in the monastery, Bada practiced calligraphy by studying the works of Tang and Song calligraphers. Not yet settled on a style, Bada employed a wide range of script types, including the standard script kaishu, fully cursive script caoshu, and semicursive script xingshu. His standard scripts were modelled on the precisely executed kaishu script of Tang calligrapher Ouyang Xun. In his cursive and semicursive scripts, Bada emulated the swift and fluid brushstrokes of Ming calligrapher Dong Qichang, achieving the flying white calligraphic effect. Toward the end of his priesthood, Bada began to explore the exaggerated cursive script of Song calligrapher Huang Tingjian.

After leaving the monastery, Bada continued to study the Song calligrapher's writing, for instance copying his essay titled "Praising the Virtue of Wine." He rendered it in a style not identical to Huang Tingjian's but combinative of various script types. His horizontal strokes were attenuated like Huang Tingjian's, while his corner strokes were sharp like Ouyang Xun's. Through the 1680s, Bada wrote in a style reflective of a balance between controlled and exaggerated forms. By 1689, he had developed his own style. Starting in 1690, Bada began to study the styles of Wei and Jin calligraphers like Wang Xizhi and incorporated them in his writing. His brushstrokes became rounded and centered, deviating from his earlier characteristic sharp strokes. Despite having established his own style, Bada remained devoted to the study of past calligraphic masters, including Wang Xizhi and the monk Huaisu, in the final years of his life.

=== Painting ===
Bada Shanren's earliest extant paintings were produced during his years in the Buddhist monastery where he practiced painting as a hobby. He painted according to the literati tradition, studying the styles of past painters like Shen Zhou and Xu Wei. The subject of his paintings were simple objects like flowers, fruits, and vegetables. From 1681 to 1684, Bada treated painting as an outlet for his emotions, particularly his dissatisfaction with his second marriage. He expanded his repertoire of subjects to include animals like birds and fish in addition to flowers and vegetables. His earliest surviving landscape paintings are dated to this period. From 1684 to 1690, Bada most frequently painted myna birds, lotuses, and rocks. From 1690 to 1694, he shifted his attention to fish, which he often depicted alone at the center of an empty composition. Starting in 1693, landscapes became a major subject of his work.

The brushwork in Bada's paintings closely mirrored his calligraphy. The paintings from his Buddhist years featured strokes consisting of thin and strong lines – reflective of a calligraphic style modeled on Ouyang Xun's writing. His brushstrokes in the Ink Flowers handscroll, dated 1666, were rendered like the diagonal strokes of the kaishu script. He moved the brush as he did in his calligraphy: by first straightening the tip of the brush and moving slowly and then by lifting the brush and moving more rapidly in the flying white manner. Bada's paintings from 1689 and 1690 mirrored his newly established style of calligraphy, featuring vigorous brushstrokes.

=== Poetry ===
Bada started to study poetry when he was seven. The classical education that he received in his youth paved way for his own poetic endeavors, helping him amass knowledge of a wide repertoire of Chinese literature and ancient characters. The poems that he wrote often included references to classical texts and obscure variants of characters, granting only those with the same background knowledge to decipher their meaning. Most of his poems were layered with metaphors and allusions. The obscurity of his language served reflected his familiarity with the Caodong sect of Buddhism. Bada's poems often ended with imagery.

== Works ==
=== Overview ===
The vast majority of Bada Shanren's works – 167 out of 179 – were produced between 1684 and 1705 during Bada's sixties and seventies. His paintings were often accompanied by his poems featuring his calligraphy. Most of his works were uncolored; the few that were colored were mostly landscape paintings. While his works changed in subject matter and brushwork over time, they all bore a composition that showcased his experimental approach to pictorial space.

=== Media ===
Bada used ink and brush on paper to render his paintings, poetry, and calligraphy. He mostly painted on small album leaves in his early years and later preferred large hanging scrolls.

=== Early works (1659–1678) ===
Only eleven of Bada's surviving works were produced during his years in the Buddhist temple. These include the Flower Studies album, the Vegetable and Fruits handscroll, the Lotus album, and the Ink Flowers handscroll. In most of his early works, his subjects were only partially represented at opposite corners of the canvas, the majority of which he left empty.

=== Works from 1680 to 1689 ===
Bada's work during the 1680s were imbued with personal emotions and political sentiments. His animal subjects often wore human-like expressions. The angular brushstrokes in his works were achieved using the side hairs of the brush. Two of Bada's rare colored works come from this period: the Lotus and Rock hanging scroll from 1686 and the Bamboo album leaf from 1689.

=== Works from 1690 to 1705 ===
During this period, Bada painted subjects ranging from flowers, animals, to landscapes. His 1694 album titled Birds, Flowers, and Landscapes featured all three kinds of subjects. His works displayed a wide tonal range, and his brushwork was brought to the fore due to the large scale of the hanging scrolls on which he often painted. Many of his works from this period were dedicated to his monk friends.

==== Anwan Album (1694) ====
The Anwan Album of 1694 was produced when the artist was nearly seventy years old. The sixth leaf of the album is a painting of a mandarin fish. The fish stares up at Bada's poem on the upper left-hand corner. The first two lines of the poem allude to a story written in the Shishuo xinyu, a book referenced by many of Bada's later works. In the story, Xie Wan elaborates on the meaning of the name Qu'e, referring to the Daoist concept of "qu ze quan," which means "to bend is to be preserved whole."

Bada's contemporaries would have been familiar with the mythical story behind the name of Lake Qu'e, centered around the unrightful dethronement of an emperor. They would have thus seen the Qu'e in Bada's poem as a metaphor for the fall of the weak Ming dynasty.

Translation of the poem on the upper left:

"Left and right, what is this water?

It is named Qu'e.

I go on seeking the place where the source enters,

Perhaps there will be many beautiful clouds at sunset."

== Names, seals, and signatures ==
The names which Bada used in his seals and signatures have been referenced to determine the chronology of his oeuvre. Like most literati painters, Bada had multiple style and poetic names that each symbolized a virtue, ability, desire, or event. In his artwork, he used these names in lieu of his formal, or assigned, names.

The twenty different style and poetic names which Bada used at distinct stages of his life reflect his changing self-image. From 1653 to 1680, during his time as a Buddhist monk, he most often used his Buddhist name Chuanqi and style name Geshan and was addressed as Xuege, or Abbot Xuege, by his friends. After leaving the priesthood, from 1680 to 1684, he invented new names while keeping the name Geshan. Most of his new names contained the word lu, meaning donkey, a condescending descriptor for a Buddhist monk. From 1684 onward, Bada settled on the name Bada Shanren. A colophon to the Nanchang xianzhi (Annals of Nanchang) explains the story behind Bada's adoption of this name. According to the colophon, Bada took this name from Ba da renjuejing (Sutra of the Eight Great Human Realizations), made by Yuan painter Zhao Mengfu.

Like other late Ming painters of his time, Bada carved seals and incorporated them in his art. He came up with multiple seal designs for some of his names. For instance, eleven different seals were found for the name Bada Shanren. As in his paintings, Bada experimented with space by leaving certain parts of the seal empty. The parts void of text were often two opposite corners of the seal. Bada further experimented with the composition by toying with the characters, splitting a character into two or combining two into one.

In addition to carving seals, Bada often signed his work in a wide range of styles ranging from standard cursive, expressive cursive, to seal script. The names he used in his signatures roughly matched the names he used on his seals, while some names occurred only in his signatures. He sometimes changed the form of his signature for the same name. For his signature Chuanqi, which he used from 1659 to 1676, he changed the character for qi in 1665. Most of Bada's work from the last twenty years of his life bore the signature Bada Shanren, written either in seal script or cursive script. The album Huangting neijing jing (Scripture of the Inner Radiances of the Yellow Court) featured the earliest known instance of the Bada Shanren signature.

== Modern copies ==
In the 20th century, copies of Bada Shanren's art were made and studied by Chinese artists such as Qi Baishi, Wu Changshi, and Zhang Daqian.

Zhang Daqian was a twentieth-century Chinese painter who made copies of Bada's work. Zhang's copies can be distinguished from Bada's real works through an examination of brushstrokes. Zhang's 1930s reproductions of Bada's midlife work featured softer and more rounded brushstrokes compared to the sharp, sideways brushstrokes characteristic of Bada's work.

== Exhibitions ==
In 1986, an exhibition and symposium were held in Nanchang, Bada's childhood home, in honor of his 360th birthday. In 1991, the Yale University Art Gallery held a major exhibition of the artist's work.

Owning the largest collection of Bada Shanren's work outside of China, the Freer Gallery of Art in Washington D.C. held multiple exhibitions on Bada Shanren in the 2000s. In 2003, it held an exhibition titled In Pursuit of Heavenly Harmony: Painting and Calligraphy by Bada Shanren along with the Arthur M. Sackler Gallery which mounted an exhibition titled After the Madness: The Secular Life, Art, and Imitation of Bada Shanren. From 2015 to 2016, the Freer Gallery displayed fifty-one of Bada's works in an exhibition titled Enigmas: The Art of Bada Shanren (1626-1705). In 2023 several of Bada Shanren's works, including his handscroll masterpiece "Flowers on a River," were featured in an exhibition titled, Flowers on a River: The Art of Chinese Flower-and-Bird Painting, 1368-1911 at the China Institute in New York City. A reduced version of this exhibition later went on to show at the Santa Barbara Museum of Art.

== Gallery ==
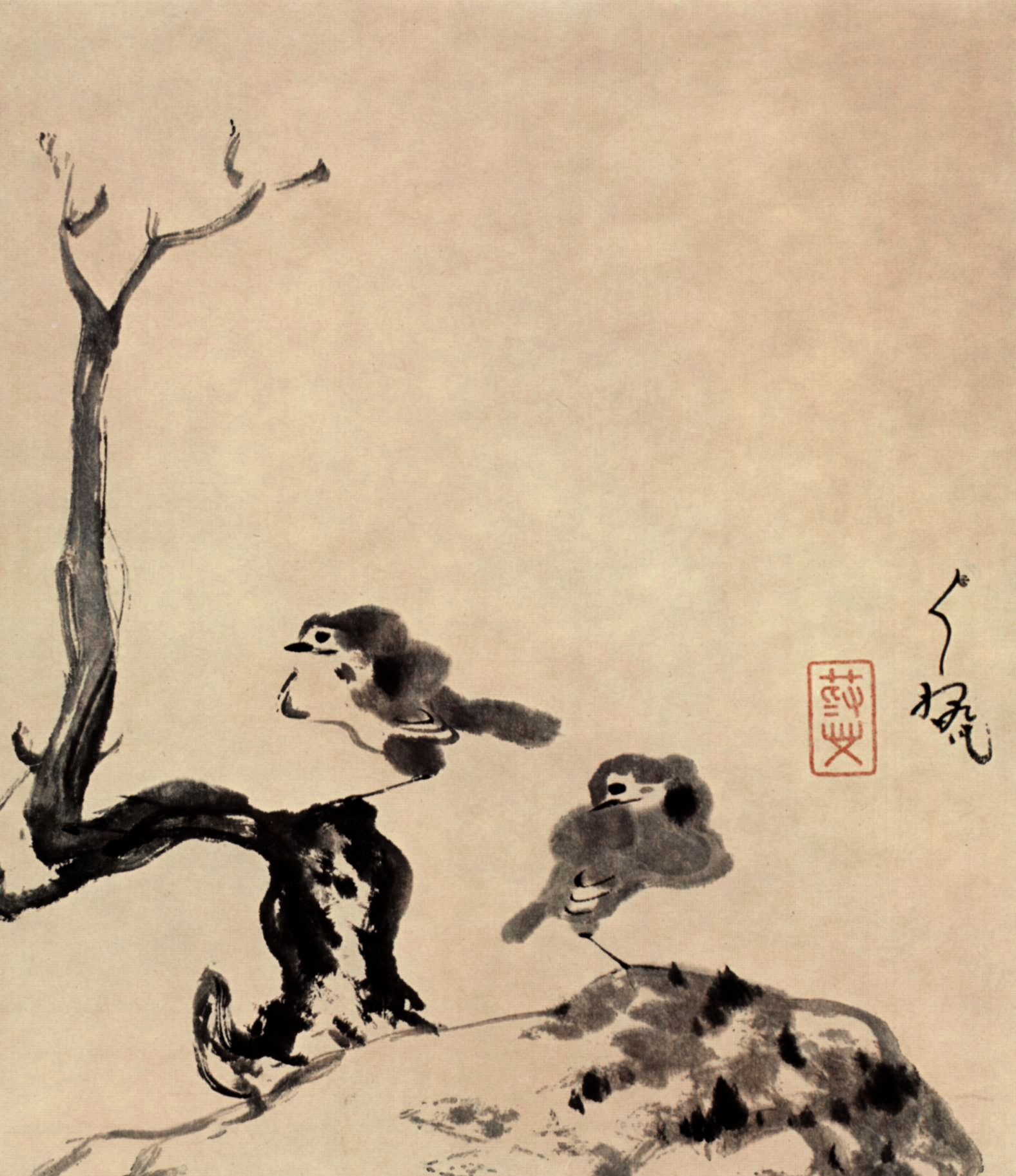
Two Birds, Sen-oku Hakuko Kan, Kyoto, Japan

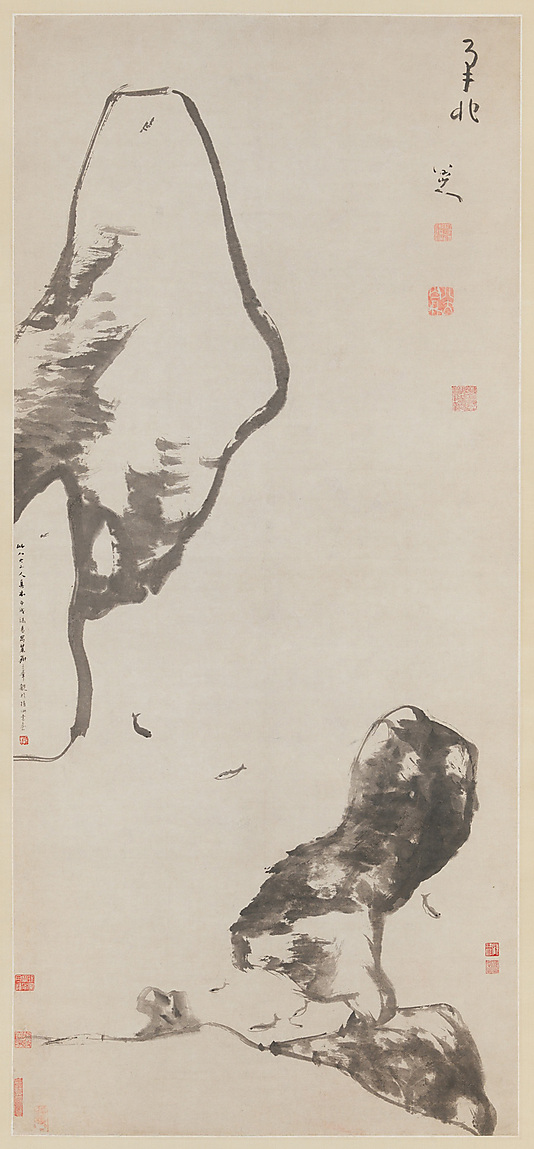
Metropolitan Museum, New York

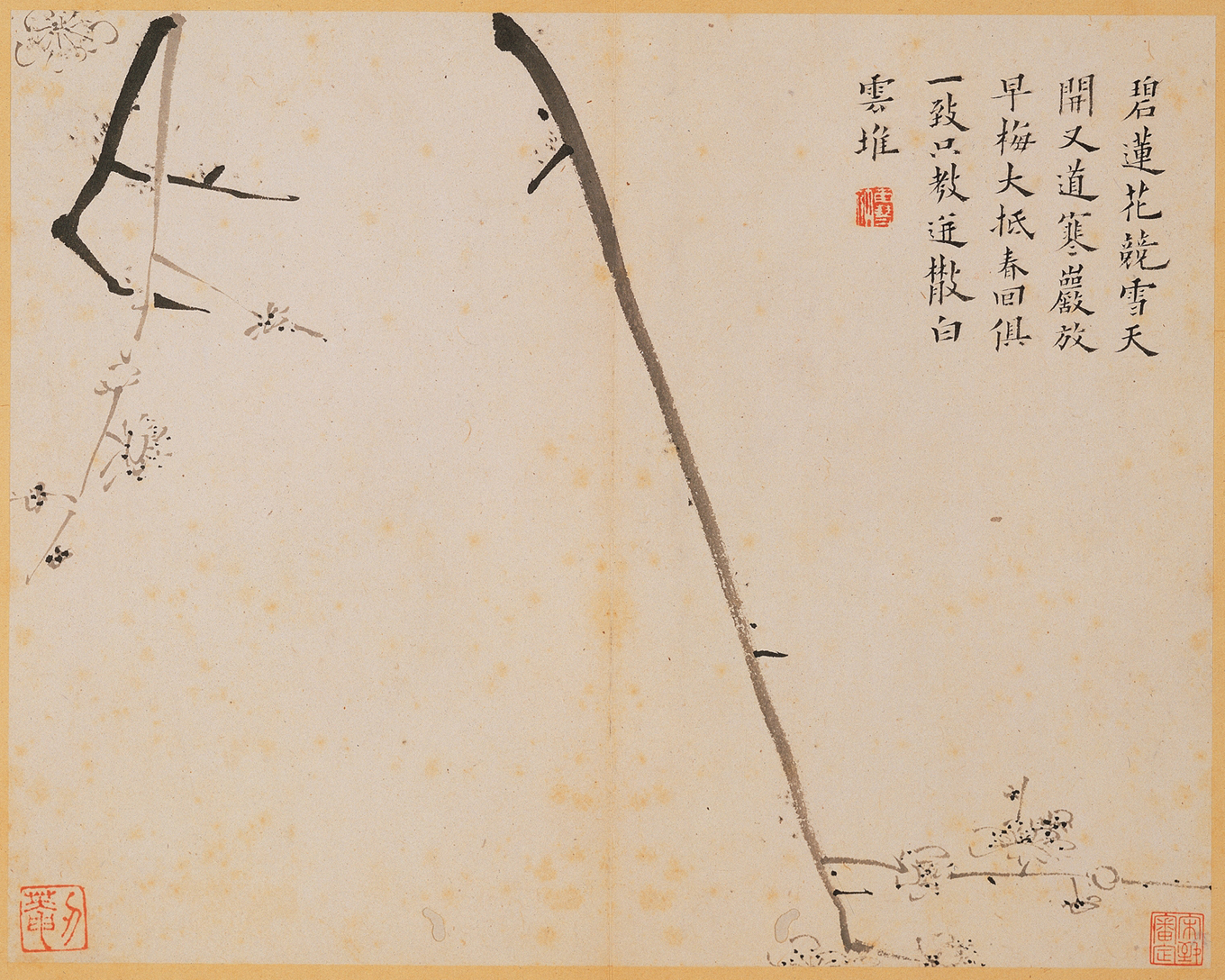
National Palace Museum, Taipei, Taiwan

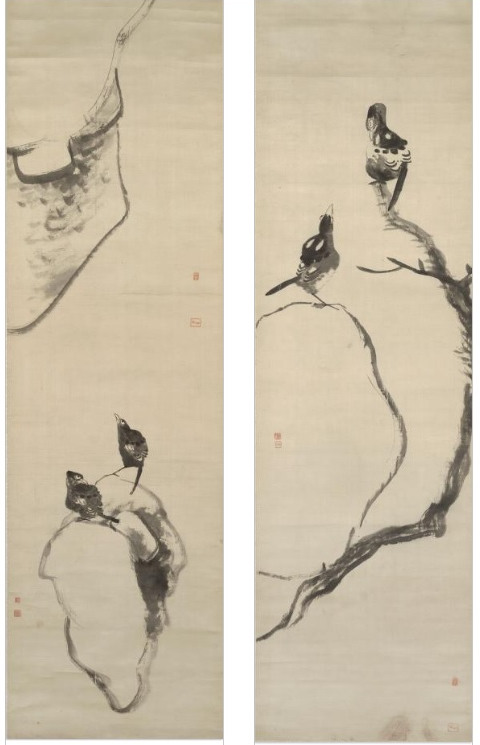
Nelson Atkins Museum, Kansas city, USA
