= Red-white-blue bag =

Nylon carry bag associated with Hong Kong culture

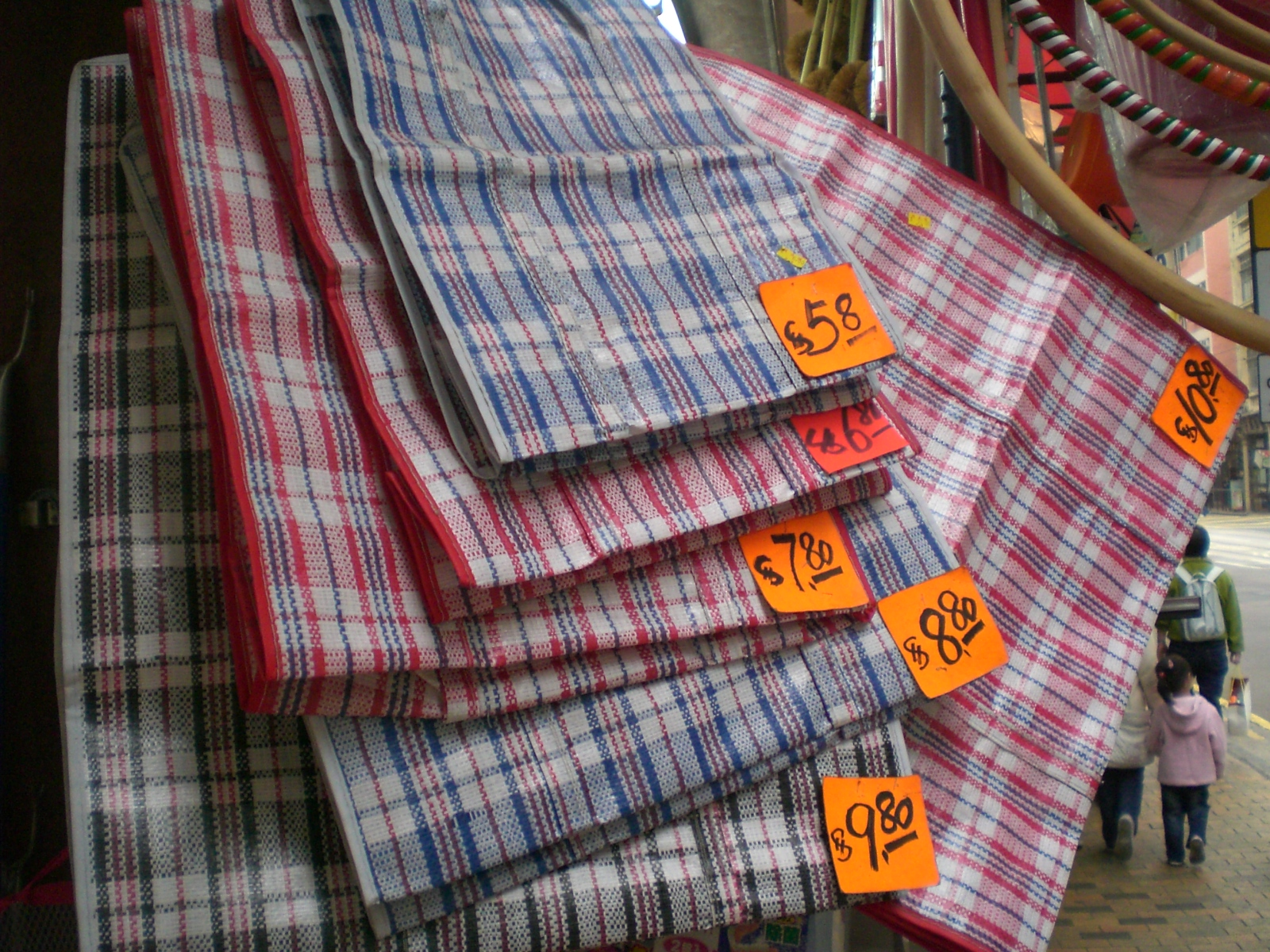
The Red-white-blue bag

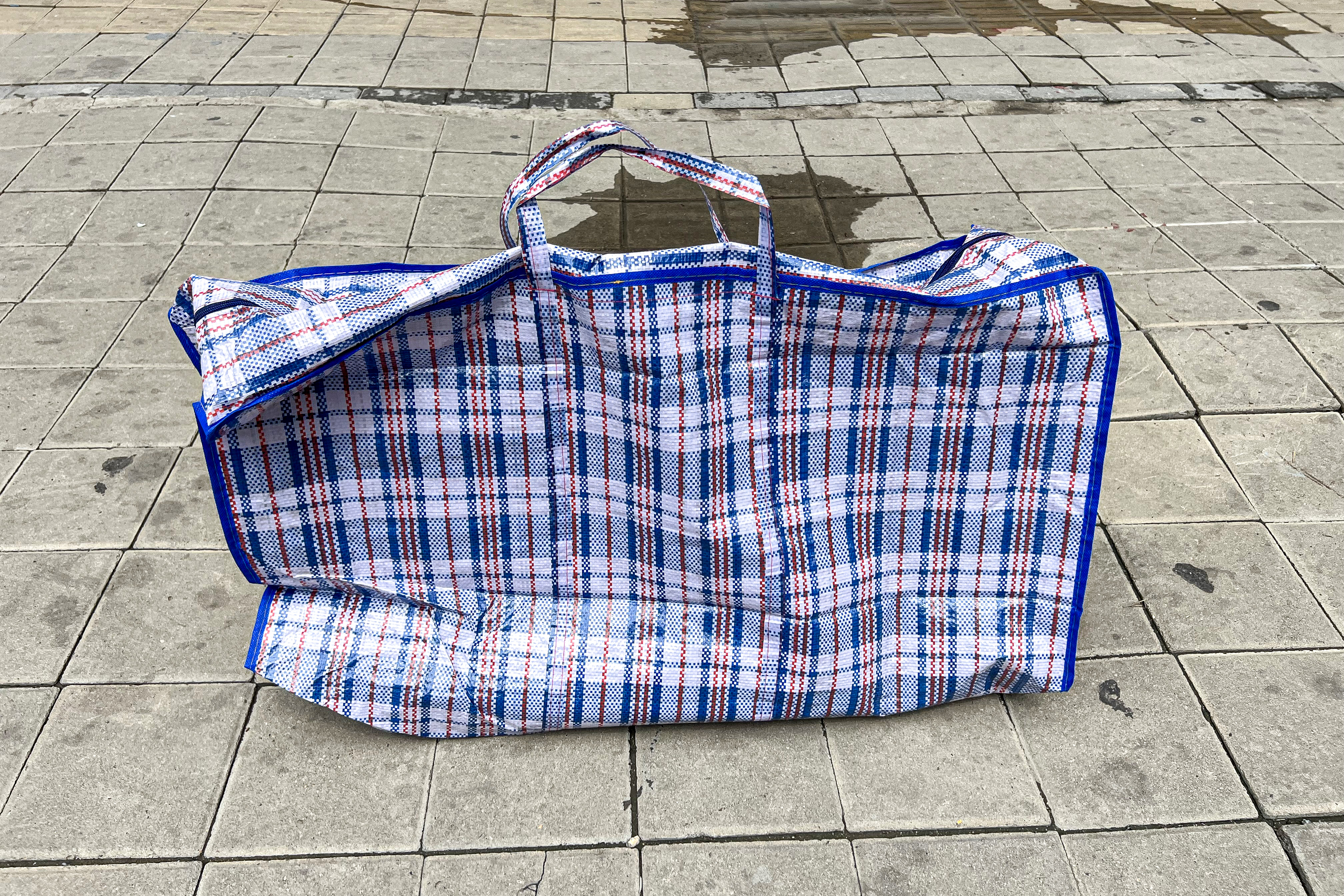
A single red-white-blue bag in Changchun

Red-white-blue bag (Chinese: 紅白藍膠袋; Jyutping: hung4 baak6 laam4 gaau1 doi2) or laundry bag is a carriage bag made out of nylon canvas in colors of red, white and blue. It originated in Hong Kong in the 1960s and has become a representative of Hong Kong culture. Because the nylon canvas is known of its light, firmness and durable usage, it is commonly used as hand carry luggage and transport between Mainland China and Hong Kong.

== History ==
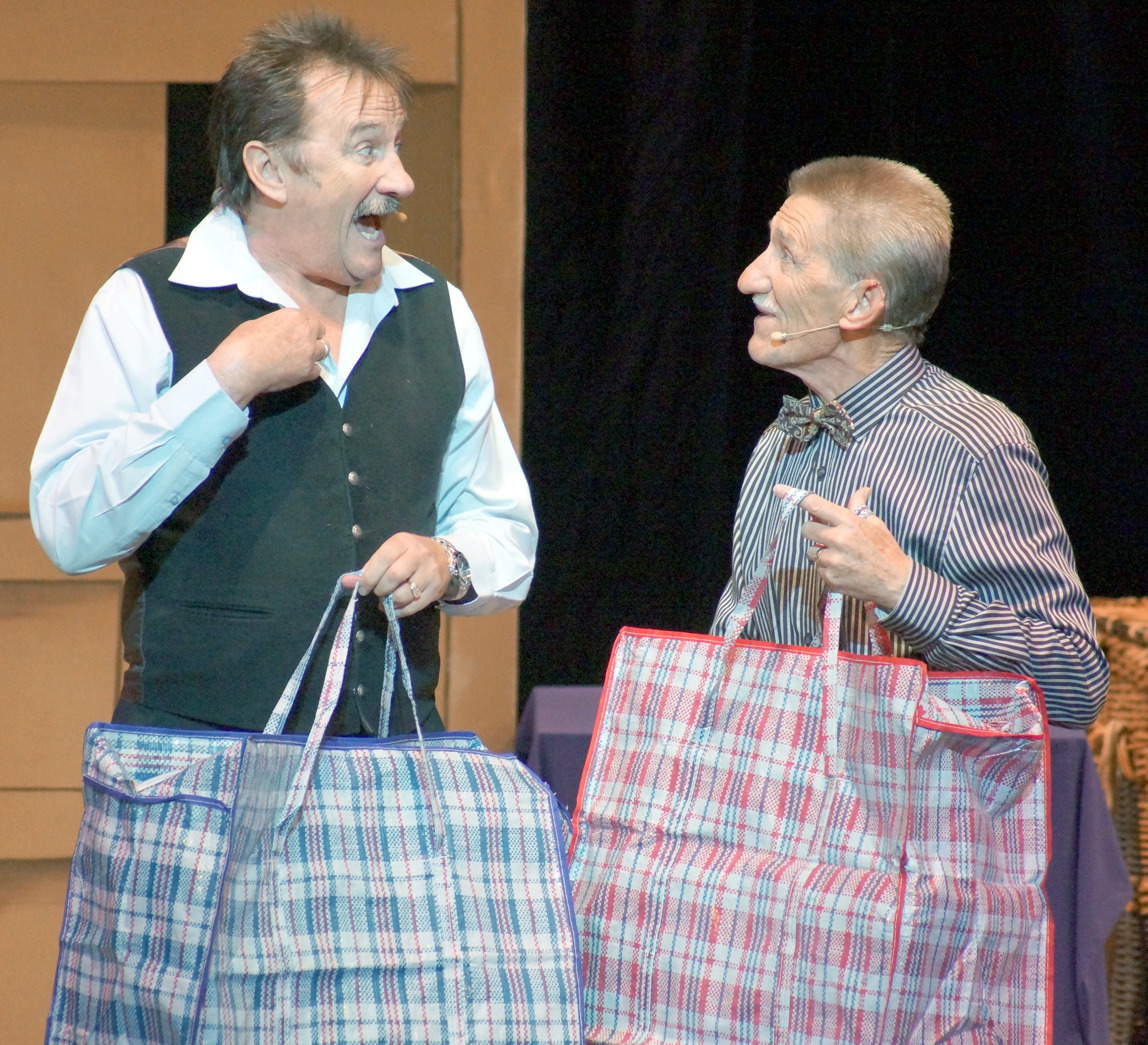

The Red-White-Blue bag was originally made from nylon canvas, which was invented by Japan, then exported to Taiwan and eventually came to Hong Kong. The canvas was originally used as shelter on construction sites, temporary roofing in squatter areas, and as protection for farmland. It was first used for bags in the 1960s by a tailor, Lee Wah, who created the bag using the canvas from a Taiwan company. Bags were only blue and white in the first place, but red was added to the fabric so that the color combination represented luck and good fortune.

These days, the Red-White-Blue bag is made of woven plastic fabric, either polyethylene (PE) or polypropylene (PP). Different colors have appeared on the market, such as black, green and orange.

== Material and structure ==
The bags are usually constructed from polyethylene. It is tightly knitted horizontally and vertically, to ensure wind and water resistance. Although the fabric is highly durable, the zippers easily break.

== Culture ==
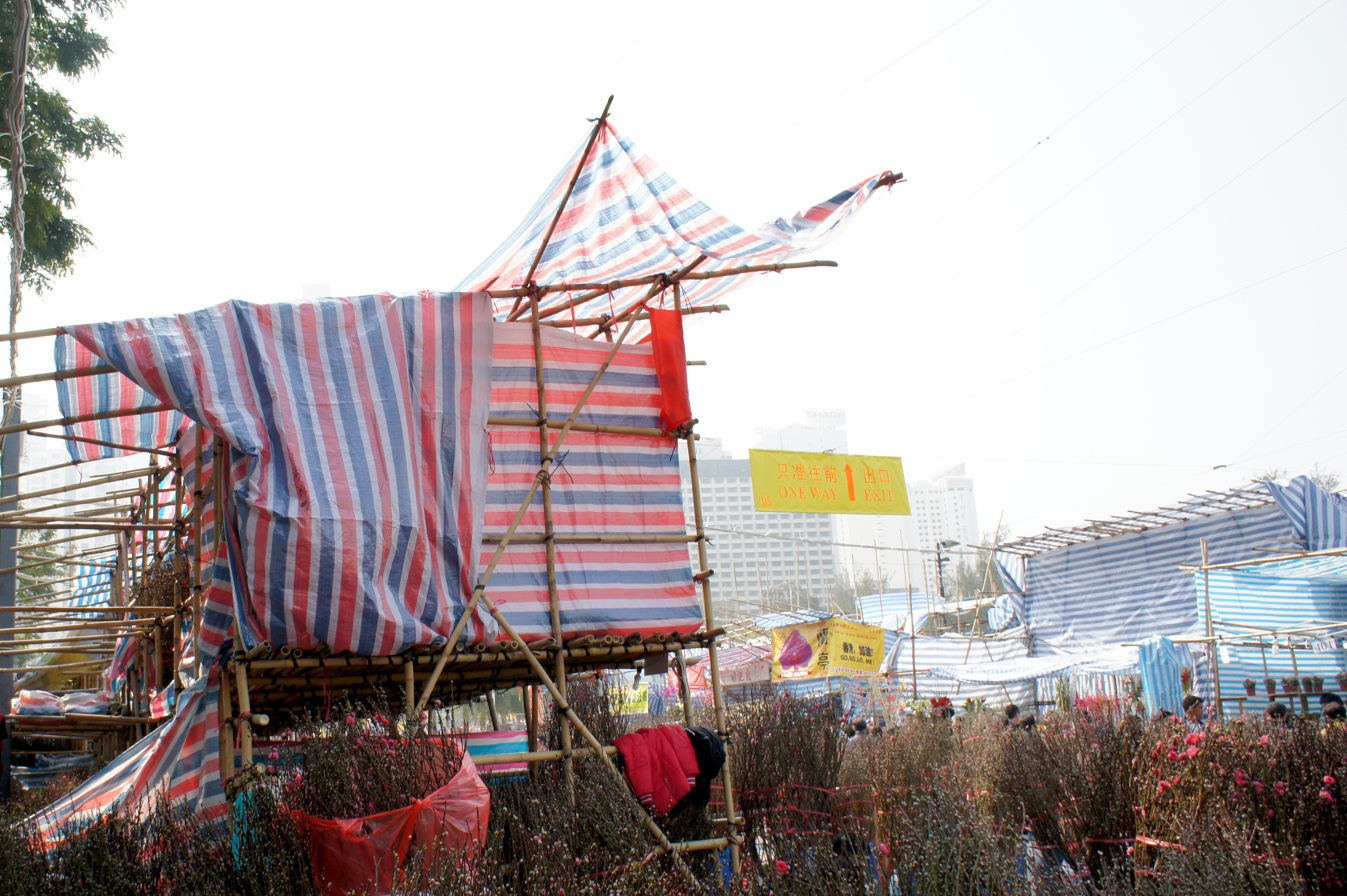
Tent of the hawkers stall in the Chinese New Year Market Victoria Park, Hong Kong

After the transfer of sovereignty over Hong Kong, Red-White-Blue bag has been part of Hong Kongers' collective memory and used to represent some of Hong Kong's core values and beliefs. It is believed to be a material that express the localness of Hong Kong, because the bags have been very popular in Hong Kong since the 1950s.

The material has been used to represent the industrious life of Hong Kong people in the 1950s and 1960s. Despite the cheapness of the material, it is very adaptable and durable to different scenarios as it was used for weatherproofing in the 1950s. The adaptable feature of the bag also symbolised Hong Kong people's resilient spirit and hardship.

Artist Stanley Wong began the Red White Blue artwork series in 2001, culminating in an exhibition in the Hong Kong Heritage Museum in 2004-5 which was said to have set the tone of subsequent discourse in the use of the red-white-blue motif in Hong Kong public art.

Sam Hui, a Hong Kong Cantopop musician and songwriter, who is famous for performing Cantonese songs that relates to Hong Kong's lifestyle and culture, wore a red-white-blue costumes to symbolize the Red-White-Blue bags and the Hong Kong spirit during his concert in 2004.

In 2006, Louis Vuitton adapted the Red-White-Blue-bag and redesigned into handbags with their logos printed on it. Although the designer of the bag claimed that the use of color is to represent the national flag of France, the bags immediately received unfavorable reviews for its showing of cheapness. Chinese critics considered the bag a failed attempt to convert their “rural worker’s bag” to high culture.

Hong Kong lifestyle design and retail brand company Goods of Desire (G.O.D.) remodelled the red-white-blue bags and adapted the color design to their products targeting the younger generation. It later became a fashionable icon in popular culture and further reinforce the core value, design and meanings of R-W-B to Hong Kong’s youth generation.

As part of the rebuild of Hung Hom MTR station in the early 2020s, artist Jaffa Lam created an artwork that features the patterns of the nylon bags printed on glass panels, as well as sculptures of historic luggage and bags.

== See also ==
- Reusable shopping bag
- Goods of Desire
