= Red White & Blue Beer =

American beer brand

Red White & Blue Beer was a brand of American beer, originally produced by the Pabst Brewing Company. By 1994, the brand was owned by G. Heileman Brewing Company of La Crosse, WI.

Pre-Prohibition advertisements lauded its "mellow" taste and drinkability.

A September 16, 2010, article in Business Week ("Keeping Pabst Blue Ribbon Cool") mentioned that the owners of Pabst were planning on reviving "dead" brands they have the rights to, including Red White & Blue Beer. Evan and Daren Metropoulos stated the revival of the brand would be based on a patriotic appeal that directly contributes to military charities.

In 2018, the Pabst tap room in Milwaukee re-released the brand for on-site sales.
