= Sen-Oku Hakukokan Museum =

Coordinates: 35.0176°N 135.7929°E

- 泉屋博古館
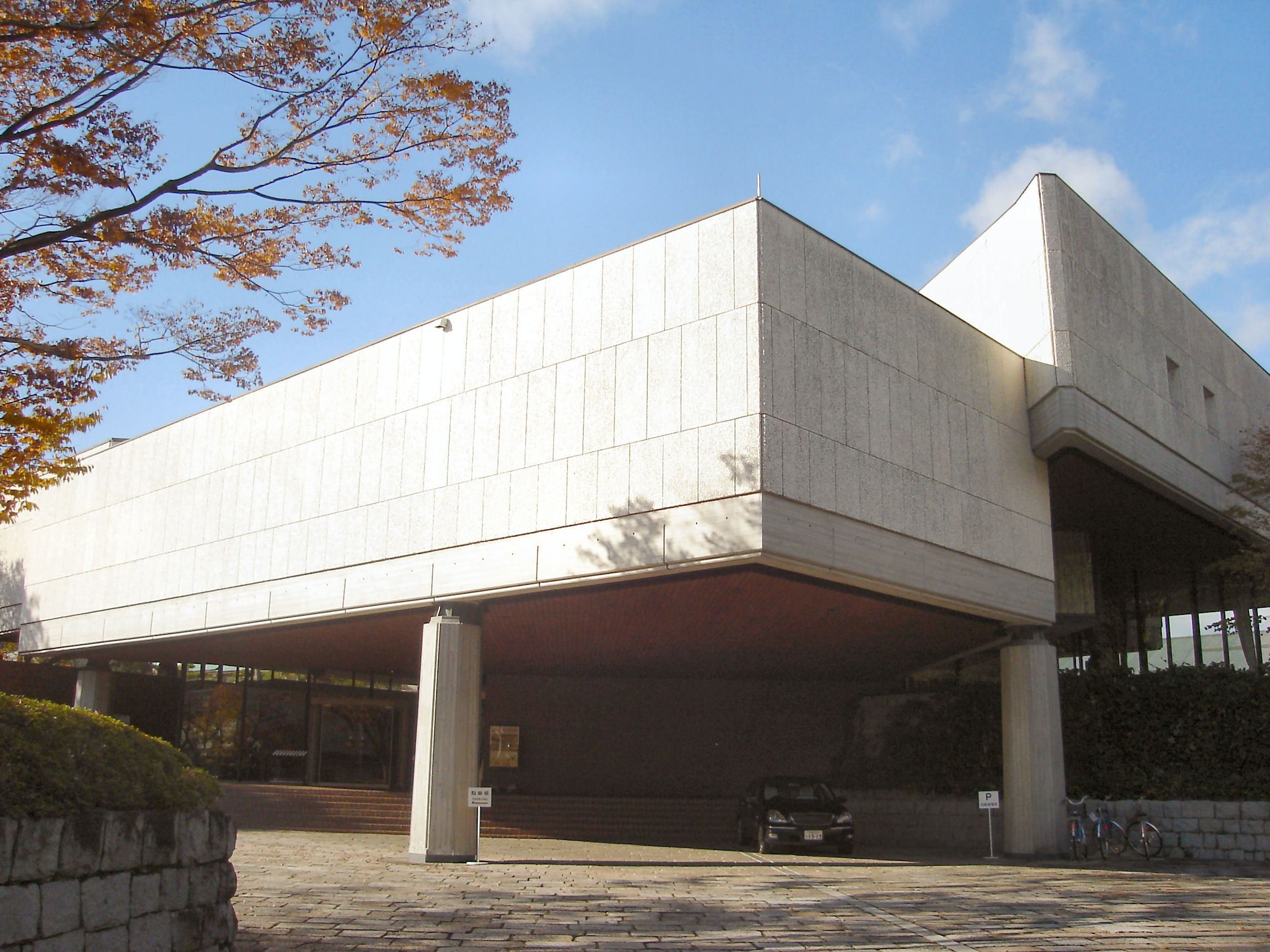
- Sen-Oku Hakukokan Museum
- Established: 1960
- Location: 24 Shishigatani Shimo-Miyanomae, Sakyo, Kyoto
- Type: Art museum
- Collection size: Chinese art, Japanese art
- Website: Museum website

The Sen-Oku Hakukokan Museum (泉屋博古館) is located in Kyoto, Japan and houses a large collection of Chinese bronze vessels, Chinese and Japanese mirrors, and a few Chinese bronze Buddhist figures.

== History and collections ==
The Sen-Oku Hakukokan Museum was established in July 1960. "Sen-oku" is the Yagō of the Sumitomo family in Edo period, and the word of "Hakuko" was taken from the antique catalogue Xuanhe Bogu Tulu (宣和博古圖錄, Senna Hakuko Zuroku in Japanese) edited in the Northern Song dynasty under Emperor Huizong of Song.

The collection was brought together by Sumitomo Kichizaemon VII before his death in 1926. It is credited with being one of the greatest collections of Asian bronzes in the world in quality and variety. The number of collections is more than 500 pieces. The museum houses more than 3,500 cultural objects, two of which have been designated by the Japanese government as National Treasures, 19 as Important Cultural Properties, and 60 as Important Art Objects.

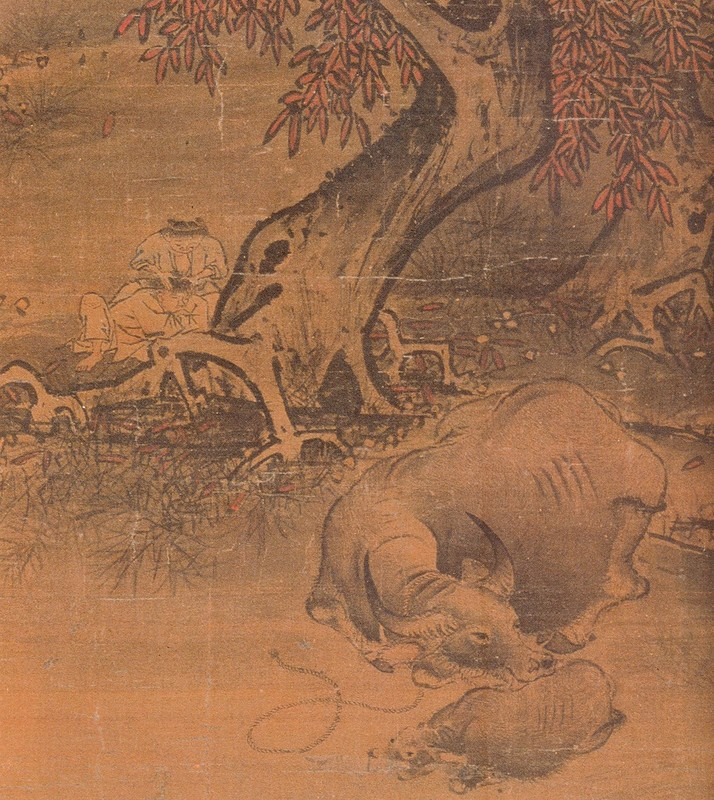
Ox-Herding in Autumn Pasture attributed to Yan Ciping, Southern Song. (秋野牧牛図)

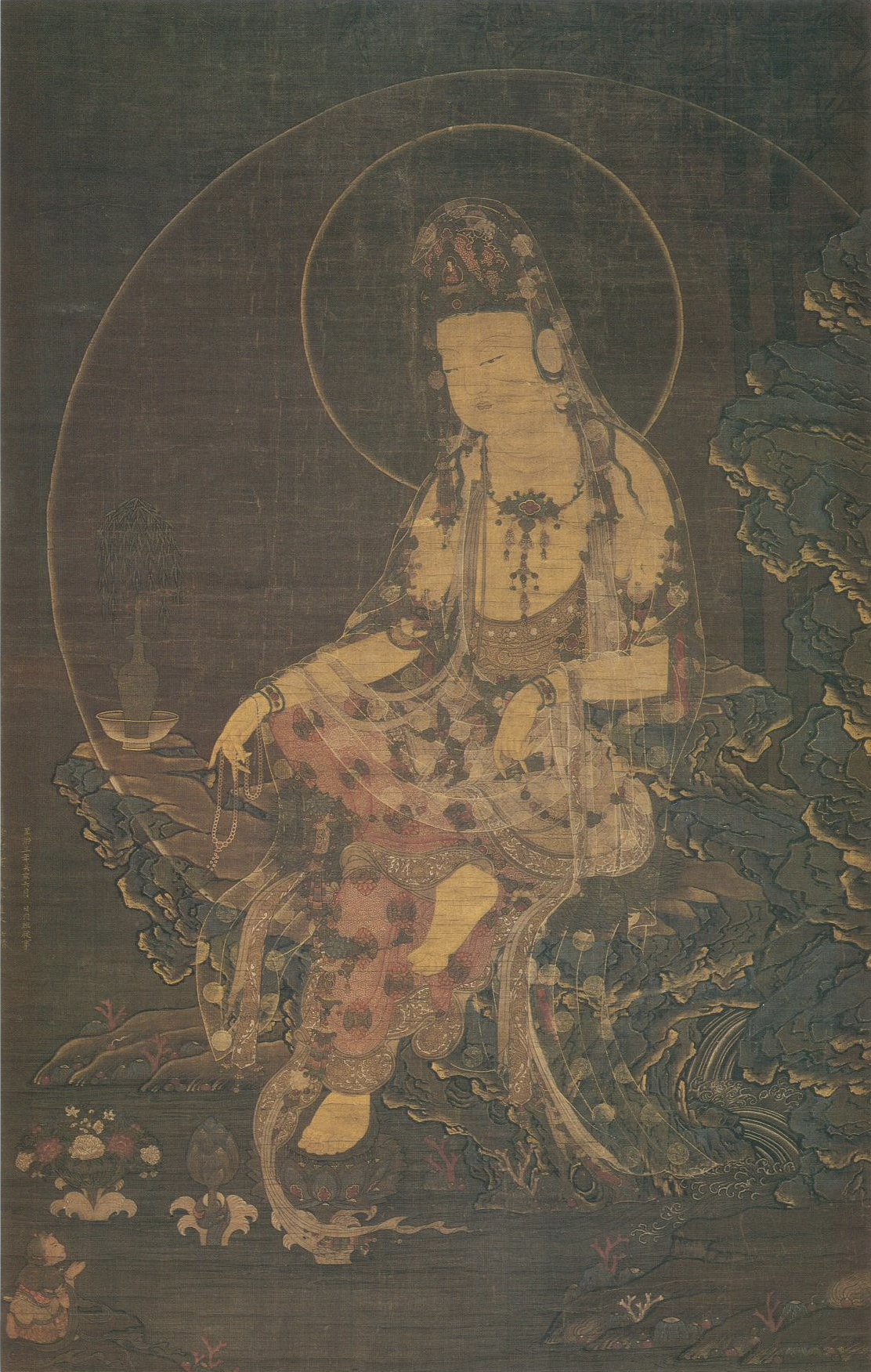
Water-Moon Avalokiteshvara by So Guban, 1323, Goryeo. (徐九方 楊柳観音像)

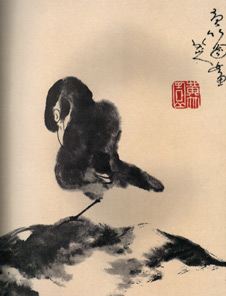
Landscape, Bird and Flower, by Bada Shanren, 1698.

== See also ==
- List of National Treasures of Japan (paintings)
- List of National Treasures of Japan (crafts-others)
