= Iwase Bunko Library =

- 西尾市岩瀬文庫
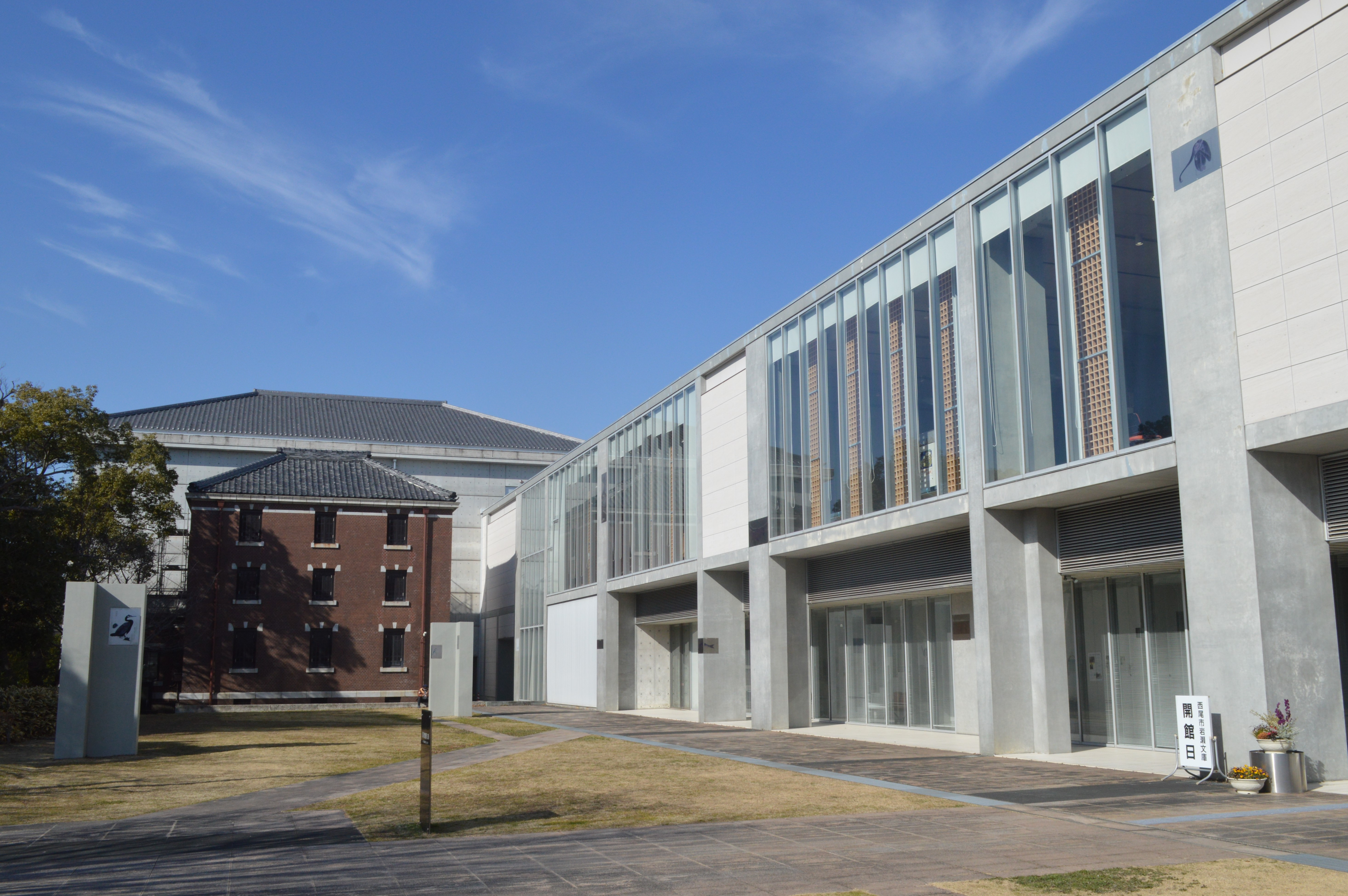
- The building in January 2022
- Type: Public Library

Other information
- Website: iwasebunko.jp

The Iwase Bunko Library located in Nishio, Aichi Prefecture, Japan is home to important collections of early modern Japanese printed books and manuscripts.

The library was founded in 1908 (Meiji 41) by wealthy local businessman and politician Iwase Yasuke (岩瀬 弥助), who made his fortune selling fertilizer and stock investments. He was elected mayor of Nishio in 1898 but stepped down after 16 months in office. During this time, he became interested in civic philanthropy. Opening the library cost Yasuke 30,000 yen, he would spend 300 yen a month to renew and expand its holdings, The original library building was a three-story brick building with a basement level. It has features not typically found in other libraries of the era, including a reading room with reserved seats for women and a children’s play area. The original building is still available for visitors to explore, but the library has since expanded into larger quarters at the same location.

The library is located around 75 minutes by train and by foot from Nagoya Station.

When it first opened, the library held 27,000 volumes, held for the express purpose of public enlightenment. It was never intended as a lending library, rather one where patrons would consult the works on-site. As of 2019, the library contains over 80,000 volumes. Since 2000, one local professor has been assembling a catalogue of the various items held in the library.

The library was damaged by the Great Mikawa Earthquake in 1945. The original brick building survived and has been registered as a National Tangible Cultural Property. The current building is "a modern, glass-and-concrete structure built in 2003", located on the same premises as the Nishio City Library.

== Notable works analyzed ==
One notable volume found recently in 2013 showed two images of a patient undergoing surgery during general anesthesia around 1840, one of the earliest representations of usage of anesthesia and six years before the next known representation.

Documents from the depository are slowly being reviewed by scholars; one particular example reviewed by experts in 2020 noted correspondence between tax authorities and the Meiji government, commenting on the situation in the Ryukyu Domain among other items. The scholars also commented on the modern typesetting used. The document was filed under the "Domain Miscellaneous Records" by the library and was not classified until being reviewed.
