= Komachi Ōji =

Street in Kamakura

Coordinates: 35°19′1.93″N 139°33′11.93″E

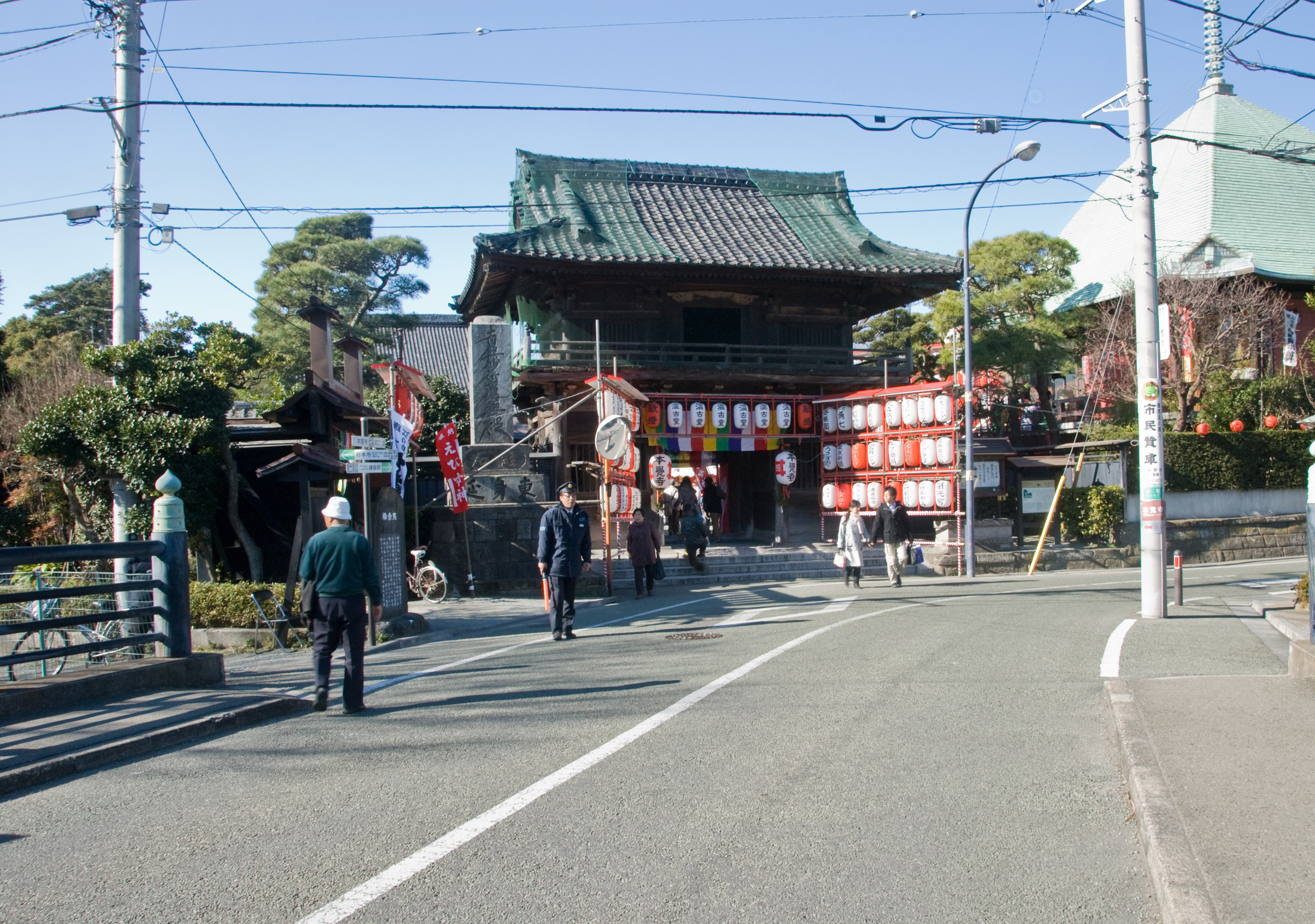
Komachi Ōji at Ebisudōbashi Bridge, where Komachi becomes Ōmachi. In the background is Honkaku-ji's gate.

Komachi Ōji (小町大路) is a street in Kamakura, Kanagawa, Japan, that begins at Sujikaebashi (筋違橋) (locality named after a bridge which no longer exists) from the Kanazawa Kaidō, crosses Yoko Ōji, passes in front of Hōkai-ji and Honkaku-ji, crosses the Ebisudōbashi Bridge (see photo), Ōmachi Ōji and Kuruma Ōji, reaches Moto Hachiman and Kōmyō-ji, and finally ends in Zaimokuza near Wakaejima.

It is believed this is what the Azuma Kagami calls "Komachi Ōji" and other texts "Komachi Kōji". It used to be also called Machi Kōji (町小路). The name seems to stem from the fact that the Ebisudōbashi Bridge has been for centuries the border between the two areas called Komachi and Ōmachi, Komachi being the more important of the two. The Azuma Kagami says that along Komachi Ōji there were the houses of the powerful (the gokenin) and, for almost the entire Kamakura period, the seat of the government. The entrance of all buildings in Komachi not belonging to the Hōjō (the ruling clan) or to the Bakufu (with the curious exception of houses of ill repute) had to face away from Wakamiya Ōji (Honkaku-ji is a good example).
