= An'yō-in =

An'yō-in (安養院) is the name of numerous Buddhist temples in Japan. Below is an incomplete list:

- An'yō-in (Kobe), a branch of Taisan-ji in Kobe, Hyōgo Prefecture
- An'yō-in (Kamakura) in Kamakura, Kanagawa Prefecture
