= Wakamiya Ōji =

Street in Kamakura, Japan

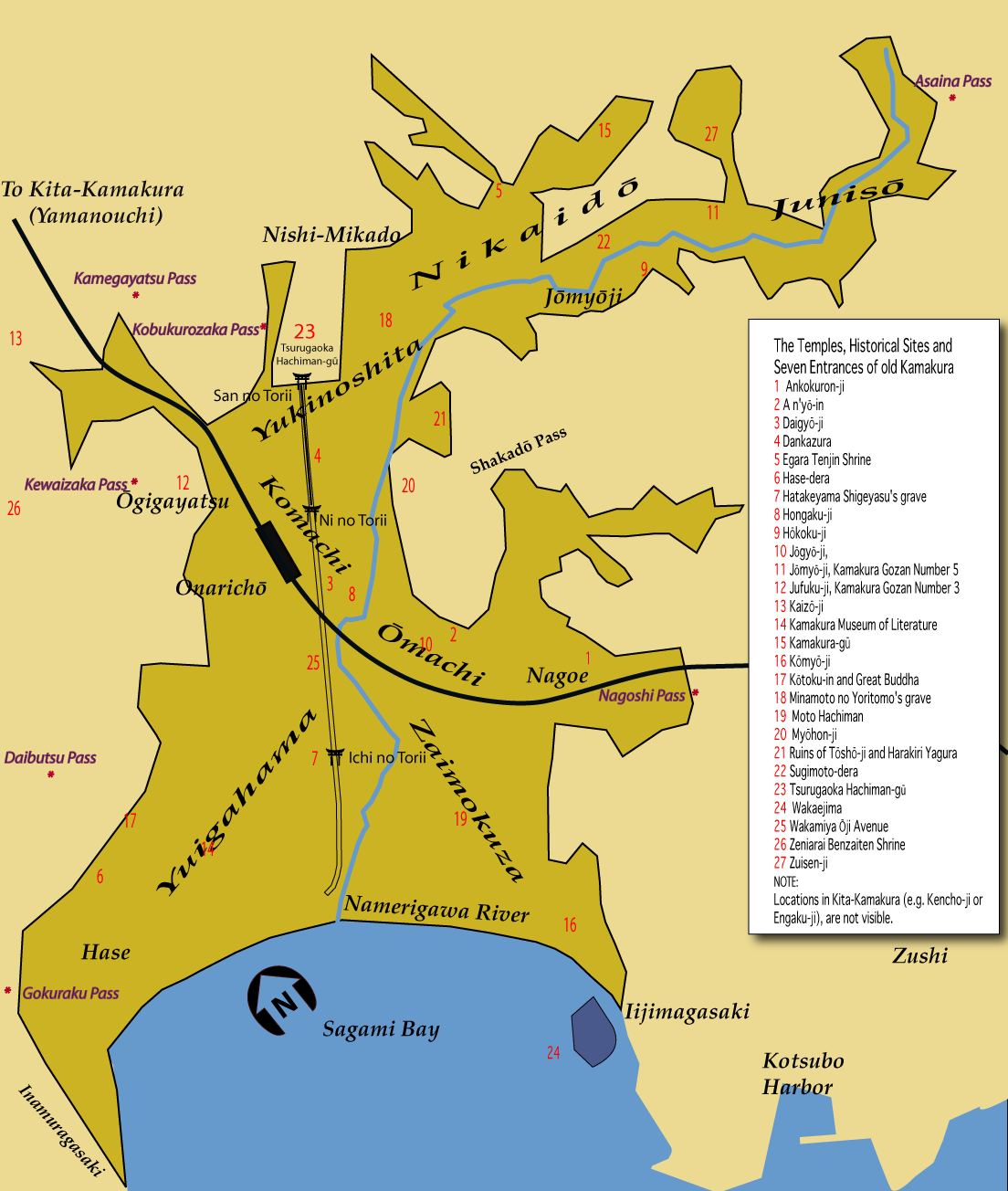
A map of Kamakura with the approximate location of the historical sites mentioned in the article. The darker color indicates flatland.

Wakamiya Ōji (若宮大路) is a 1.8 km street in Kamakura, a city in Kanagawa Prefecture in Japan, unusual because it is at the same time the city's main avenue and the approach (sandō (参道)) of its largest Shinto shrine, Tsurugaoka Hachiman-gū. Over the centuries, Wakamiya Ōji has gone thorough an extreme change. A heavily trafficked road today, it used to be, to the contrary, off limits to most people as a sacred space. At the time of the Kamakura shogunate it was an essential part of the city's religious life, and as such it hosted many ceremonies and was rich with symbolism. Since its construction, Wakamiya Ōji has been the backbone of the city's street planning and the center of its cultural life. The street has been declared a Historic Site and was chosen as one of the best 100 streets in Japan.

== History ==
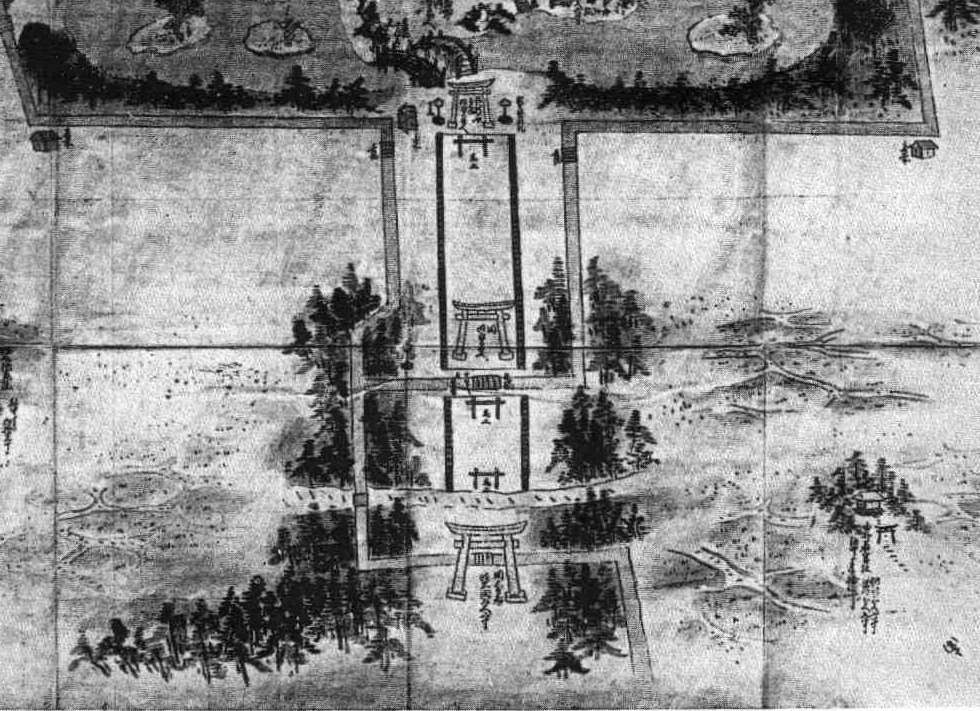
Wakamiya Ōji and the dankazura in an Edo period print

Like most of Kamakura's famous things, Wakamiya Ōji was built at the time of the Kamakura shogunate. Its builder, first Kamakura shōgun Minamoto no Yoritomo, wanted to imitate Kyoto's Suzaku Ōji (朱雀大路). The name Wakamiya Ōji means "Young Prince Avenue" and derives from its having been built in 1182 as a prayer for the safe delivery of Yoritomo's first son, future shōgun Yoriie. That name also appears in the Azuma Kagami, but from historical records it seems likely that the avenue at the time was more often called Wakamiya Kōji (若宮小路). In fact, all other Kamakura streets called Ōji by the Azuma Kagami, for example Ōmachi Ōji and Komachi Ōji, are also called Kōji in other medieval texts.

During the Muromachi period, Wakamiya Ōji was called with a number of different names by different sources, including Nanadō Kōji (七度小路), for example in Tsurugaoka Hachiman-gū's official records, Nanadō Kōrō (行路) in the Kaigen Sōzuki (快元僧都記), and Sendō Kōji (千度小路) or Sendōdan (千度壇) in a poetry collection called Baika Mujinzō (梅花無尽蔵). The word Nanadō ("seven times") refers to the number of times the shōgun's representative for the Kantō region (the "Kantō kubō") would walk around the torii gate called "Hama no Torii" (see below) in a ceremony part of a whole week of religious celebrations. Analogously, the term Sendō ("a thousand times") refers to the custom of praying a thousand times while on this sacred avenue.

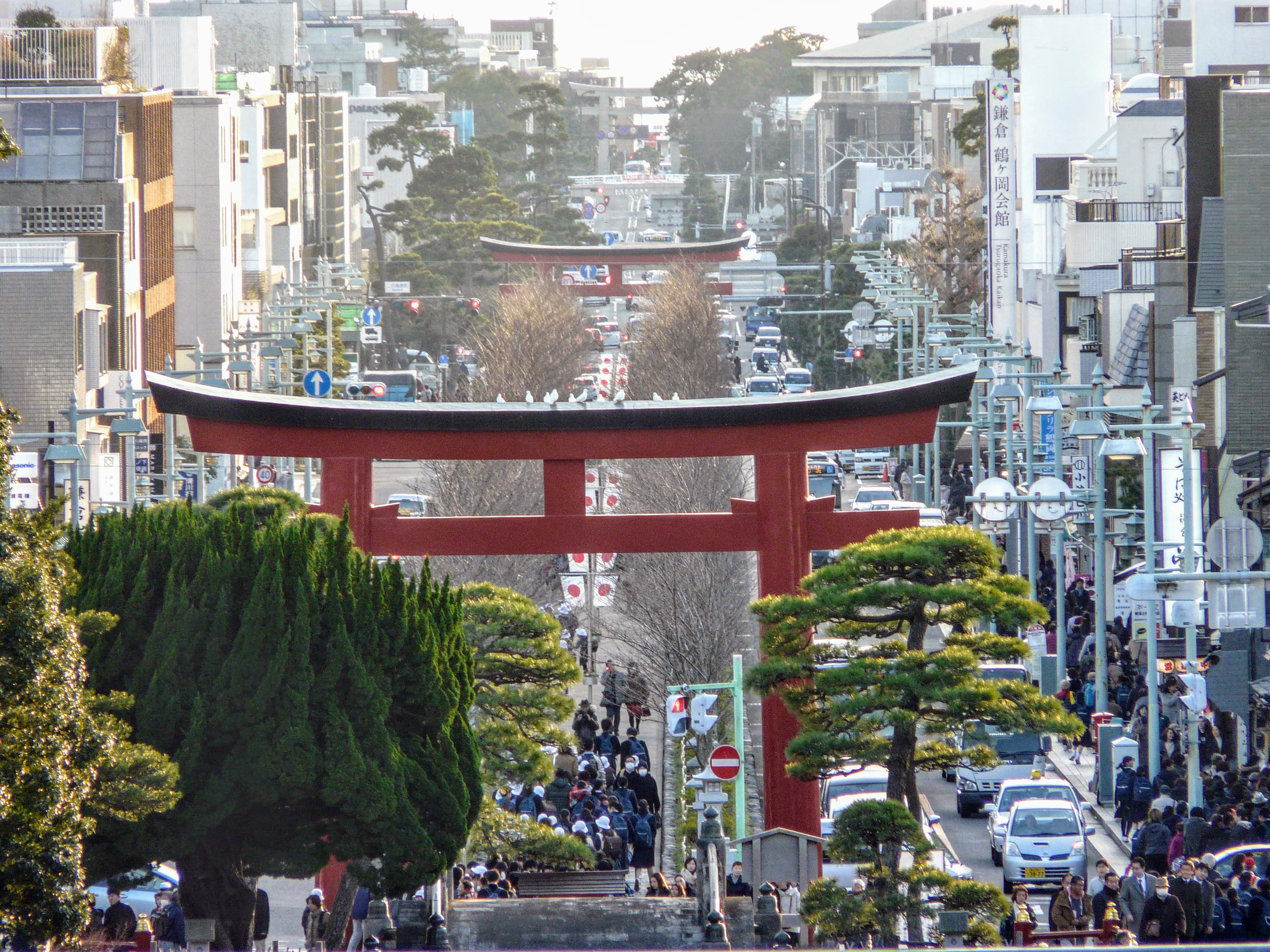
Ichi no Torii, Ni no Torii, and San no Torii on the approach (Wakamiya Ōji: sandō)

Recent excavations have revealed that Wakamiya Ōji was originally 33 m wide (much more than now), was flanked by pine trees (now present only next to Ichi no Torii, see below), and on its sides run a 1.5 m ditch. Next to its upper course, on the two sides there were empty spaces where the remains of a market have been found.

Being a shrine's approach, the avenue passes under three torii, or Shinto gates, called respectively Ichi no Torii (first gate), Ni no Torii (second gate) and San no Torii (third gate). The ordinal number decreases with the distance from the shrine, so the closest to Tsurugaoka Hachiman-gū is actually San no Torii. All were destroyed and rebuilt many times. Today's San no Torii and Ni no Torii were built in reinforced concrete in 1934 and are painted bright red, the remaining one is made of stone and was erected by Tokugawa Ietsuna in the 17th century. We know from the Shinpen Kamakurashi that until the Edo period the gate closest to the shrine was called Ichi no Torii, the middle one Ni no Torii, and the one closest to the sea Hama no Ōtorii ("Great Beach Torii") (see the section Hama no Ōtorii below). This was by far the holiest of the three, a symbolic link between the city and the sea from which it depended.

Wakamiya Ōji itself was a sacred and ceremonial road which led to a sacred beach, and was used only for the shōgun's pilgrimages to the shrines in Izu and Hakone (see also the section Yuigahama), and during official visits of important dignitaries. In May 1185, Taira no Munemori, captured after the decisive Minamoto victory at the battle of Dan-no-ura, entered Kamakura with his son through Wakamiya Ōji. Normal people were rarely allowed on it, but the Azuma Kagami records that on this occasion it was lined with onlookers.

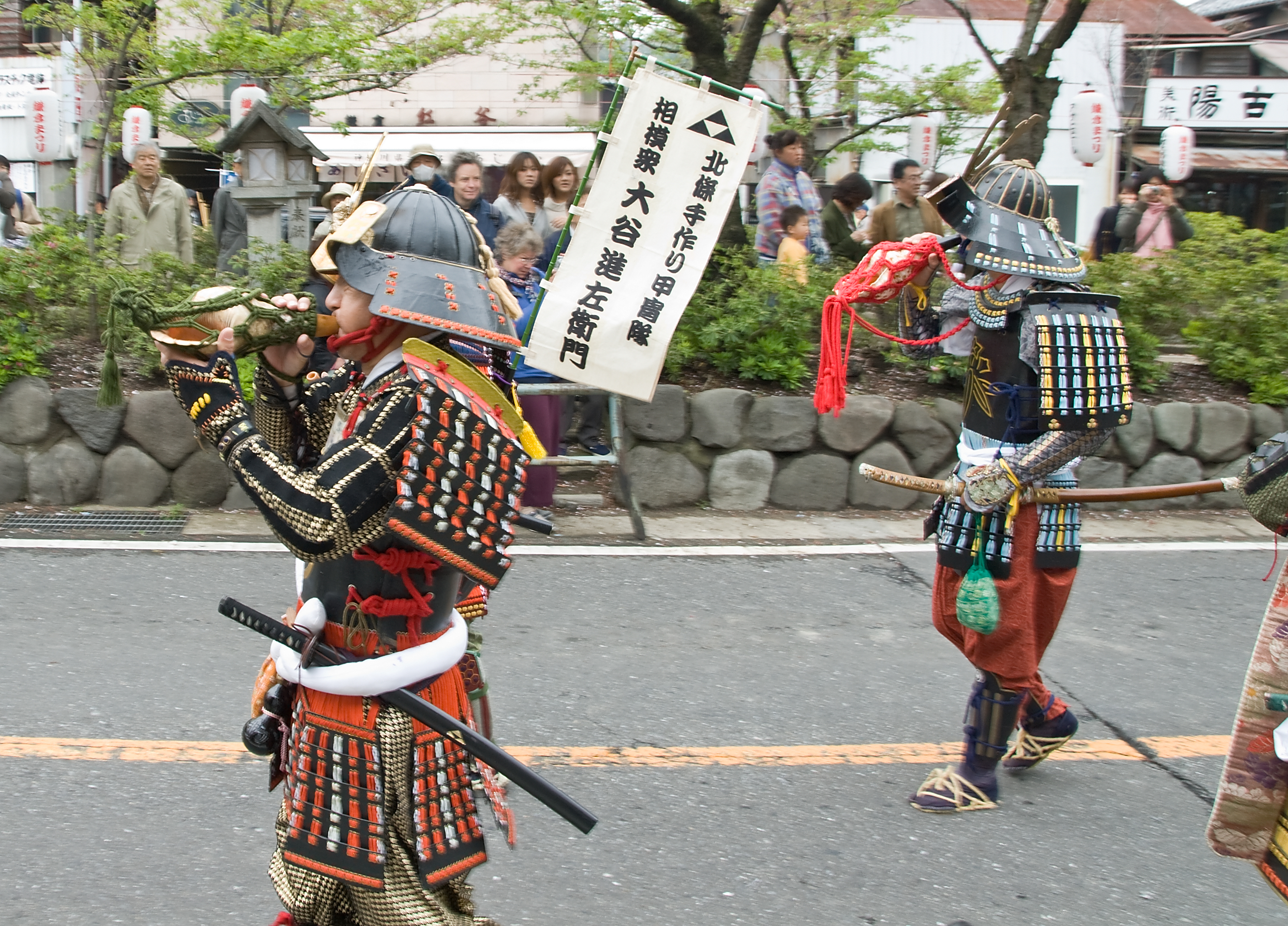
Parade on Wakamiya Ōji during the Kamakura Matsuri. The dankazura is visible in the background

The Azuma Kagami tells us that, on its east side, in Komachi, there were the houses of the powerful and, for almost the entire Kamakura period, the seat of the government (called Utsunomiya Bakufu, first, and Wakamiya Ōji Bakufu later). The entrance of all buildings not belonging to the Hōjō or the Bakufu (with the curious exception of houses of ill repute) had to face away from Wakamiya Ōji (today's Hongaku-ji is a good example). Like today, the social class of those living to the west of the avenue was in general lower. The reason seems to be that, because six of the Kamakura's Seven Entrances faced west and any attack was in any case likely to come from Kyoto, which lies in the same direction, Wakamiya Ōji had a military value as a line of defense, and positions on its east side were desirable.

Further south social status dropped even further, because near Geba (see below) there were the pleasure quarters.

=== San no Torii ===
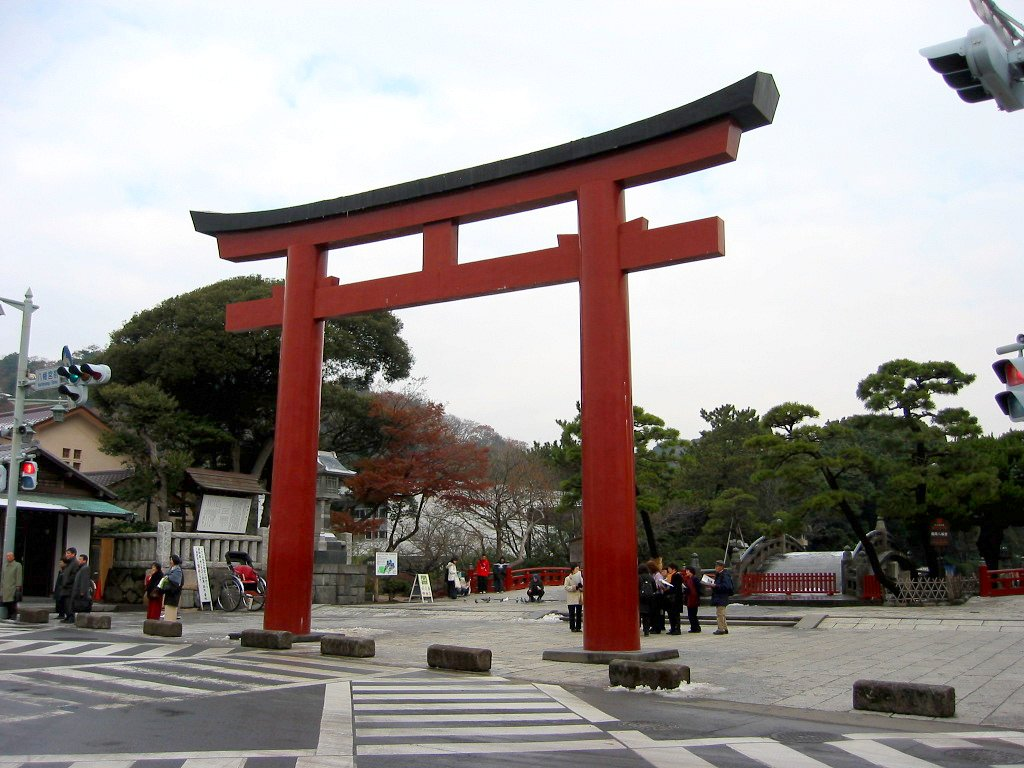
The beginning of Wakamiya Ōji at the San no Torii

35°19′25.75″N 139°33′18.13″E

Wakamiya Ōji begins at San no Torii, which stands at the exit of Tsurugaoka Hachiman-gū. During the Kamakura period, this particular gate used to also be the point of departure of the three main routes in the Kantō region of the old Kamakura Kaidō network of roads. The Kamakura Kaidō, built by the shogunate for its own use, consisted of roads that from all directions converged on Tsurugaoka Hachiman-gū. It allowed quick troop movements from and to Kamakura and was of great importance during the many internal wars of the period. The three main routes were called Kami no Michi (上の道, upper route), Naka no Michi (中の道, middle route), and Shimo no Michi (下の道, lower route).

The exact courses of the three routes aren't known and are the subject of debate, but the following are the most widely accepted:

From Tsurugaoka Hachiman-gū's gate, the Kami no Michi passed through the Kewaizaka Pass, then Susaki, Watauchi (today's Fujisawa), Karasawa, Iida (within today's Yokohama), then Seya, Tsuruma (today's Machida), Tamagawa, Bubai, Fuchū, Kokubunji, Sayama, and Ogawa, then, at the Usui Pass, divided in three, forming the Shinanoji (信濃路) (that went towards today's Nagano Prefecture), Jōshūji (上州路) (that went towards today's Gunma Prefecture), and the Musashiji (武蔵路) (that went towards Musashi Province, today's Tokyo Prefecture). For unknown reasons, this route appears to be what the Azuma Kagami calls the Shimo no Michi.

The road called Yoko Ōji that goes from San no Torii to Kita-Kamakura is still called "Kamakura Kaidō" once it leaves town, and used to be the Naka no Michi. The Naka no Michi departed from Tsurugaoka Hachiman-gū with a left turn and passed through the Kobukurozaka Pass, Yamanouchi, Ofuna, Kasama (within today's Yokohama), Nagaya, Futamatagawa, and Nakayama, finally joining the Kami no Michi there.

The last road, known as the Shimo no Michi, was a branch of the Naka no Michi that departed before Tsurumi (within today's Yokohama), then crossed Maruko, Shibuya, Hatogaya, Yono, Iwatsuki, Koga, and Yūki, before reaching Utsunomiya.

=== The dankazura and Ni no Torii ===
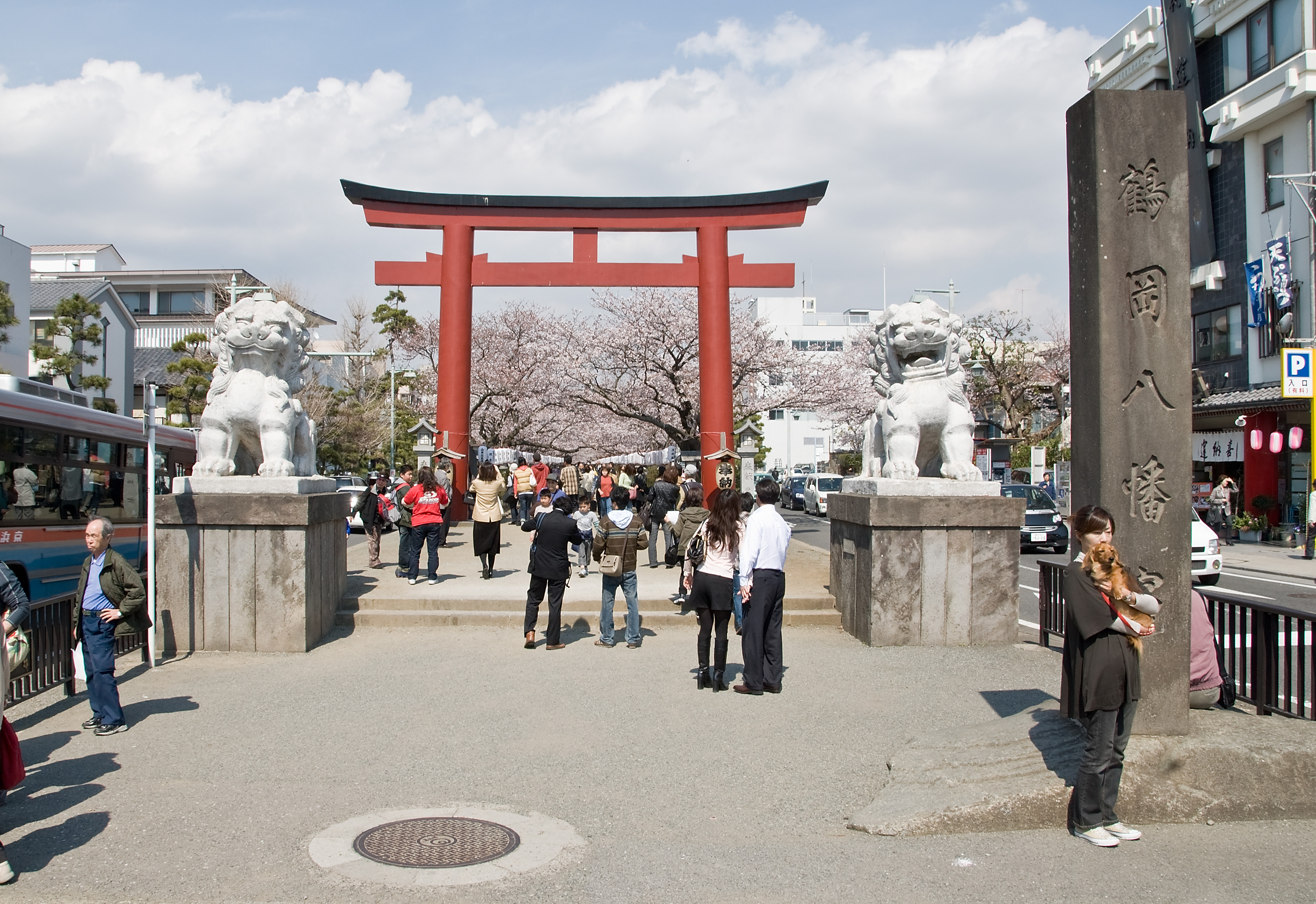
Ni no Torii, the dankazura and the cherry trees in full bloom

35°19′11.48″N 139°33′9.34″E

Immediately after the San no Torii begins the dankazura (段葛), a raised pathway flanked by cherry trees which becomes gradually wider as it goes toward the sea. This structure makes the approach, when seen from Tsurugaoka Hachiman-gū, seem longer than it actually is. It is lined with cherry trees which bloom every year in early April, when many visitors come from all over the Kantō region to see them. Its entire length is under the direct administration of the shrine.

The stele under Ni no Torii reads:

The dankazura is also called Okiishi (置き石). In March 1182, Minamoto no Yoritomo, wanting his wife Masako to have a safe delivery, had this sandō built from Tsurugaoka Hachiman-gū all the way to Yuigahama's Great Torii. The stones and dirt necessary were personally carried by Hōjō Tokimasa and by many samurai of the Minamoto clan. The portion of the dankazura from the second torii onward was removed during the Meiji period.

Although this structure is as old as Wakamiya Ōji itself, the name dankazura first appears in the Edo period in the Shinpen Kamakurashi. During the Muromachi period it was called, among others, Okiishi as the stele says, Tsukurimichi (作道), or Okimichi (置路).

The demolition of so much of the dankazura actually took place over a long time. The portion from Hama no Ōtorii to Geba Yotsukado was gradually demolished during the Edo period after having been damaged by an earthquake and a flood in 1495. The July 26, 1534 entry of the Kaigen Sōzuki tells us that damages from floods were so great that pilgrims going to Tsurugaoka Hachiman-gū and other pedestrians had to take a detour. It also describes the efforts of a private citizen who entered priesthood, started carrying dirt and stones to repair the Dankazura, and begged for money to fix Geba's bridge.

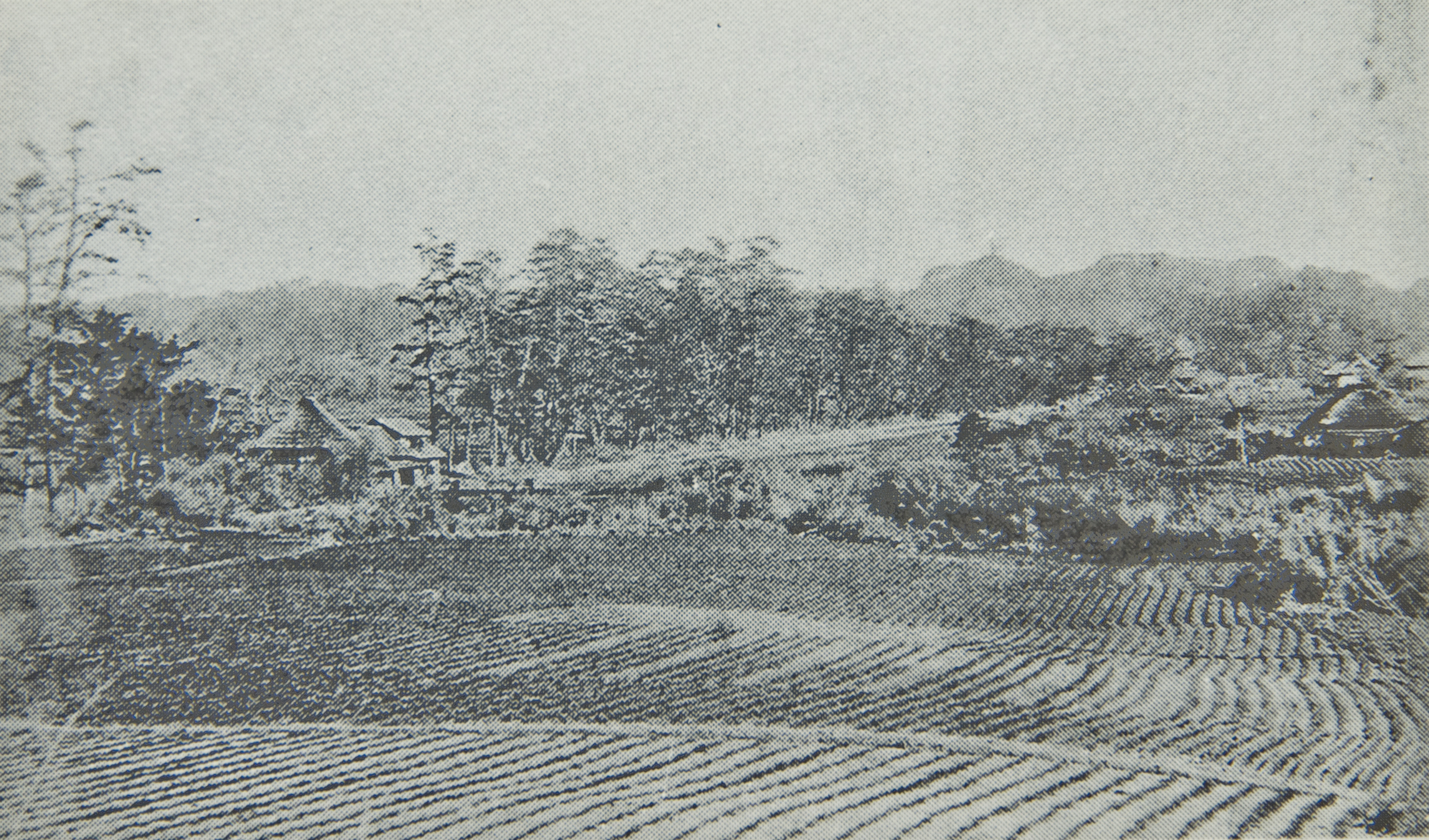
Wakamiya Ōji in an 1868 photo

The avenue was then further shortened in 1878 to let the new Yokosuka Line pass through.

The two "lions" in front of Ni no Torii (visible in the photo) are in effect warden dogs called komainu (狛犬, korean dogs). So called because they were thought to have been brought to Japan from China via Korea, their name is derived from "Koma" (高麗), the Japanese term for the Korean kingdom of Koguryo. They are almost identical, but one has the mouth open, the other closed. This is a very common pattern in statue pairs at both temples and shrines (it is in effect Buddhist in origin) and has an important symbolic meaning. The open mouth is pronouncing the first letter of the sanskrit alphabet ("a"), the closed one the last ("um"), representing the beginning and the end of all things

=== Geba Yotsukado ===
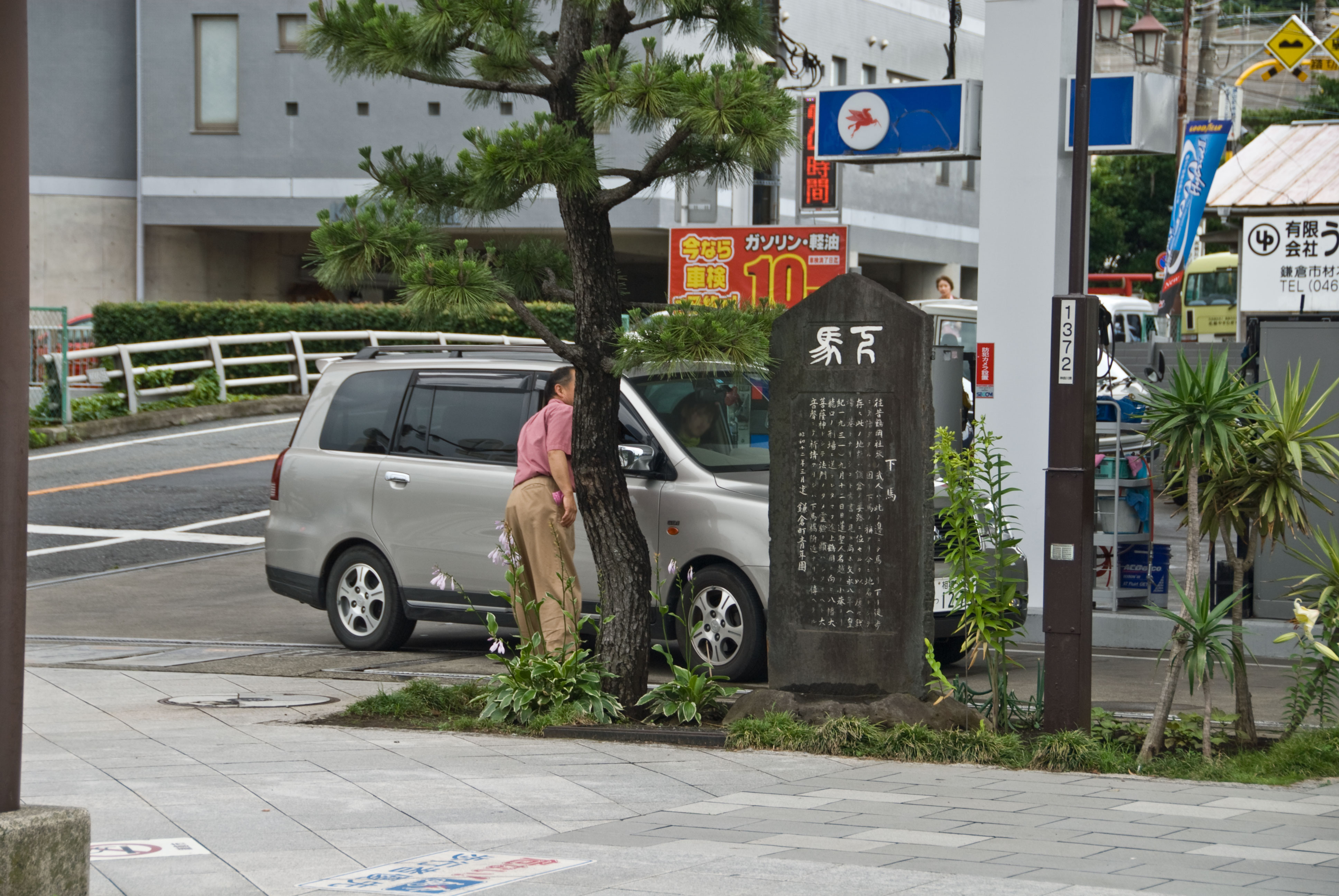
The black stele at Geba

35°18′56.52″N 139°33′0.16″E

Between Ichi no Torii and Ni no Torii lies the Geba Crossing (下馬四角, Geba Yotsukado), where Ōmachi Ōji crosses Wakamiya Ōji. The etymology of the name Geba ("Dismount horse") is interesting.

Wakamiya Ōji used to pass over three bridges (see Edo period print above): the first was Tsurugaoka Hachiman-gū's Akabashi, the second was at Ni no Torii, where a brook (now covered but still visible on Komachi Dōri) crossed Wakamiya Ōji. The third was at today's Geba, where, according to a brass plaque found on the spot, the Sansuke river flows. (The river was covered in the 1960s to ease traffic.) Because at each bridge there was a sign with the order for horsemen to dismount, they were called respectively Kami no Geba (上の下馬, Upper Geba), Naka no Geba (中の下馬, Middle Geba), and Shimo no Geba (下の下馬, Lower Geba). Only the third name stuck. At Shimo no Geba, riders would get off their horses and proceed on foot, in deference to the shrine ahead.

The stele in front of the gas station reads:

A long time ago, when samurai came to worship at Tsurugaoka Hachiman-gū, they had to dismount from their horses here, and for that reason this place was called Geba. The name has remained. Geba has an important position within Kamakura and old stories tell how it was often a battleground. It is said that, on September 12, 1271, Nichiren, arrested in his hut in Nagoe and on his way to the execution ground in Tatsunokuchi to be beheaded, turned to Tsurugaoka Hachiman-gū and yelled: "Hachiman Bosatsu, if you are a kami, give me a sign for the sake of Buddhism!"

The Azuma Kagami informs us that here in Geba Wakamiya Ōji stopped being a rich and stately avenue, and transitioned into the main street of a bustling pleasure quarter.

==== The Geba Incident ====
At the end of the Tokugawa shogunate there were several incidents involving violence against foreigners, the most famous of which is the Namamugi incident in 1862. Two years later, in 1864, two more Britons were slashed to death at this intersection by some Japanese men.

On November 22, 1864, British cartoonist Charles Wirgman and photographer Felice Beato were in Enoshima near Fujisawa, where they met Major Baldwin and Lieutenant Bird of the British garrison in Yokohama. Wirgman invited the two men to join them, but they declined because they wanted to go and see the Kamakura Daibutsu. On November 22, the two men were sketching near Wakamiya Ōji when they were stopped and murdered by some samurai. Three men were arrested and executed for the crime, and the head of their leader was publicly displayed in Yokohama. Baldwin and Bird were laid to rest in Yokohama's Foreign Cemetery.

=== The remains of Hama no Ōtorii ===
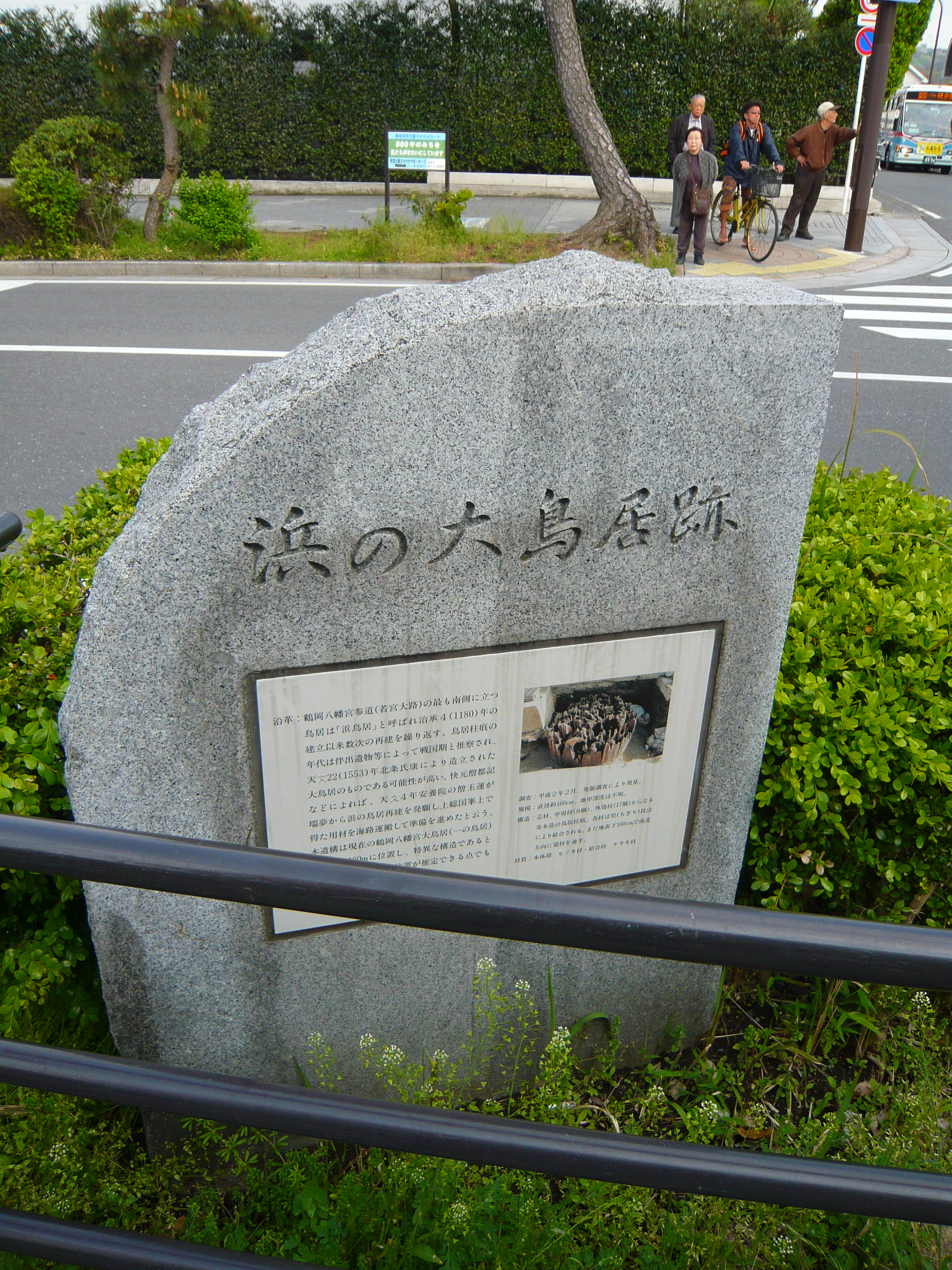
The stone near the remains of the Hama no Ōtorii

35°18′53.04″N 139°32′57.71″E

About 130 m after Geba are the remains of the great Hama no Ōtorii. The name appears several times in the historical records, and the Shinpen Kamakurashi indicates that it referred to what is today called the Ichi no Torii, the gate closest to the sea. This symbolically and religiously important gate was destroyed and rebuilt many times. The Azuma Kagami says that, on November 22, 1215, a new Hama no Ōtorii was built in Yuigahama to replace the old one which had been destroyed by a storm. The replacement didn't last long, because a strong earthquake (and the consequent tsunami) destroyed it together with its shrine on May 15, 1241.

The ruins that were found here belong to one of its many incarnations. The spot is marked on both sidewalks by stone circles which cover the actual remains of the torii. On the eastern sidewalk there's a small monument (see photo) that reads:

History:

Tsurugaoka Hachiman-gū's southernmost torii, called "Hama no Ōtorii" ("Great Beach Torii"), was first erected in 1180 and then rebuilt several times. The remains of its pillars were dated on the basis of objects found with them to the Warring States period (戦国期, sengoku-ki), and it is very likely to be the one erected by Hōjō Ujiyasu in 1553. According to Kaigen's diary, in 1535 An'yō-in's Gyoku'un in a dream was asked to rebuild Hama no Ōtorii and so, brought in the material via sea from the mountains of Kazusa Province he started the construction. The remains are about 180 m north of Tsurugaoka Hachiman-gū's Ichi no Torii, have an unusual structure and have been important in determining the position of the original Hama no Ōtorii.

Discovered during an archeological survey in February 1990 Pillar dimensions: 160 cm thick, length unknown Structure: Single core with 8 surrounding pieces Material: Core in hinoki, rest in keyaki

Today's Ichi no Torii is about 180 m further towards the sea. We don't know where Hama no Ōtorii used to stand in the Kamakura period, but it is certain that the shoreline a thousand years ago was much behind today's, so the sea was probably very close to the great gate. This particular torii was the point where Tsurugaoka Hachiman-gū's approach met the water, a symbolic link between a road sacred to the city's tutelary kami Hachiman and the sea. As such, it had great religious importance. Since all the crossings with other big roads were further north, this spot was probably not very frequented, but it was here, however, that a ceremony was periodically held to calm a wind called Fūhakusai (風白祭). Its great religious significance can also be guessed from the fact that, during the Muromachi period, every February the Kantō Kubō (the shōgun's representative in western Japan) would come meditate at Tsurugaoka Hachiman-gū for a week, and during that period he would walk seven times around Hama no Ōtorii.

==== Ichi no Torii ====
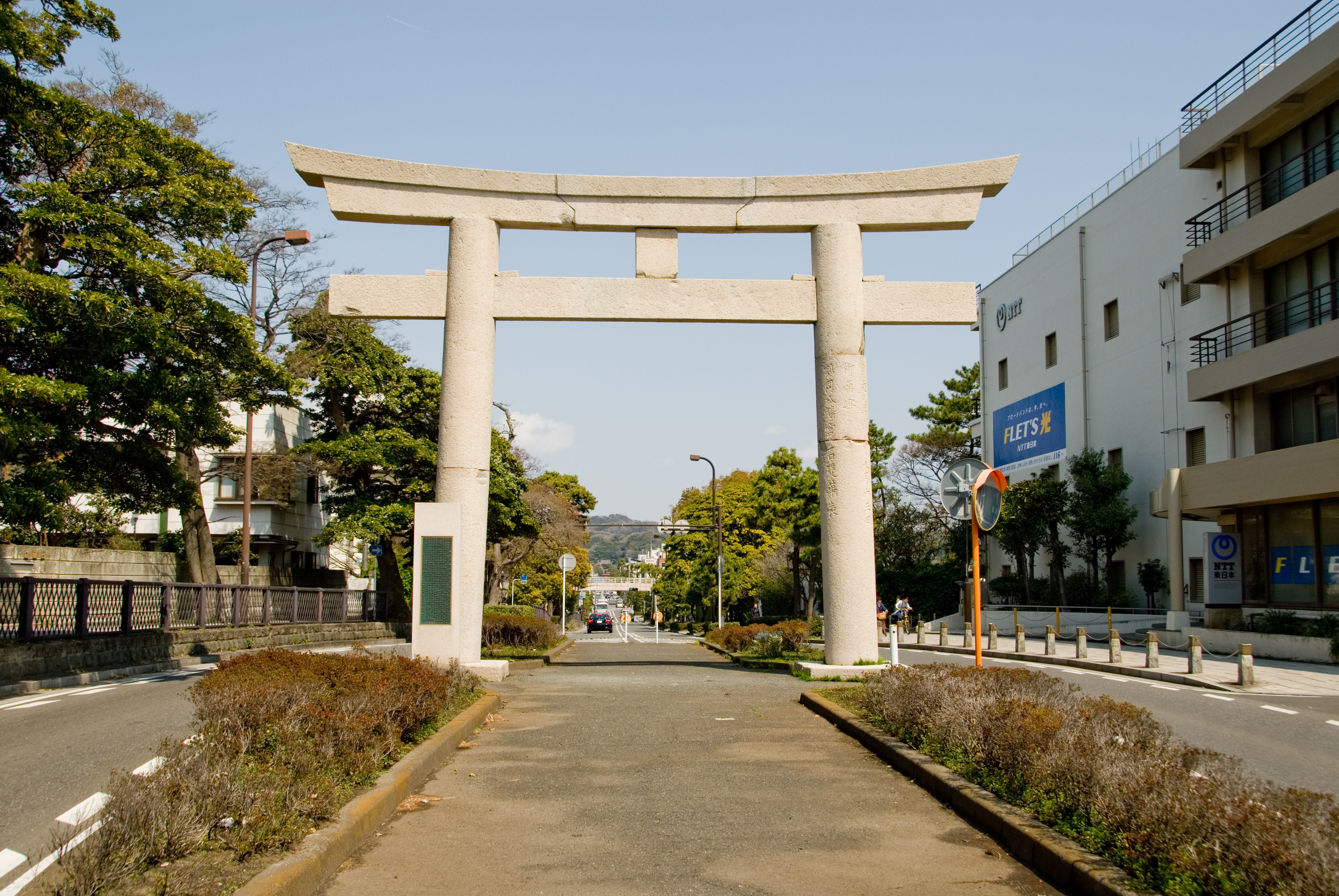
Ichi no Torii in Yuigahama. Clearly visible the damage sustained during the 1923 Great Kantō earthquake.

35°18′47.61″N 139°32′54.58″E

As already mentioned, the Ichi no Torii was called Hama no Ōtorii for most of Kamakura's history, and it is only the last of a long series. A bronze plaque (visible in the photo) on it describes its history

Ichi no Torii
This Great Torii is also called Ichi no Torii. Its construction was started by Minamoto no Yoritomo in December 1180 and finished in 1182 together with the dankazura by his wife Hōjō Masako, bringing the magnificent Wakamiya Ōji to completion. It was later repaired several times by the shogunate. In 1668, Tokugawa Ietsuna, on his grandmother Suugen'in's request, used Mikage stone from the island of Inushima near Bizen to rebuild not only this torii, but also Ni no Torii and San no Torii. This Great Torii was considered a magnificent example of stone torii, so in August 1904 was declared a National Treasure. Save for the lower part of its two pillars, it was seriously damaged during the Great Kantō earthquake of 1923. The Ministry of Education immediately made plans for its reconstruction, and in 1934 the project was entrusted to Sakatani Ryōnoshin and Oka Hiroshi, who in a short time planned the necessary repairs. In March 1936, work was started with the financial help of the National Treasury, of Mr. Ueda Chita and Mr. Kanda Saburo, and finished in August of the same year. The job was entrusted to the direction of Nakarai Kiyoshi, governor of Kanagawa, who in respect of tradition reused as much as possible the old parts, and requested the necessary stone replacements from Inushima. In addition to obtaining the seven stone pieces from the original source, he was careful to preserve the general look of the monument.

=== Hatakeyama Shigeyasu's grave ===
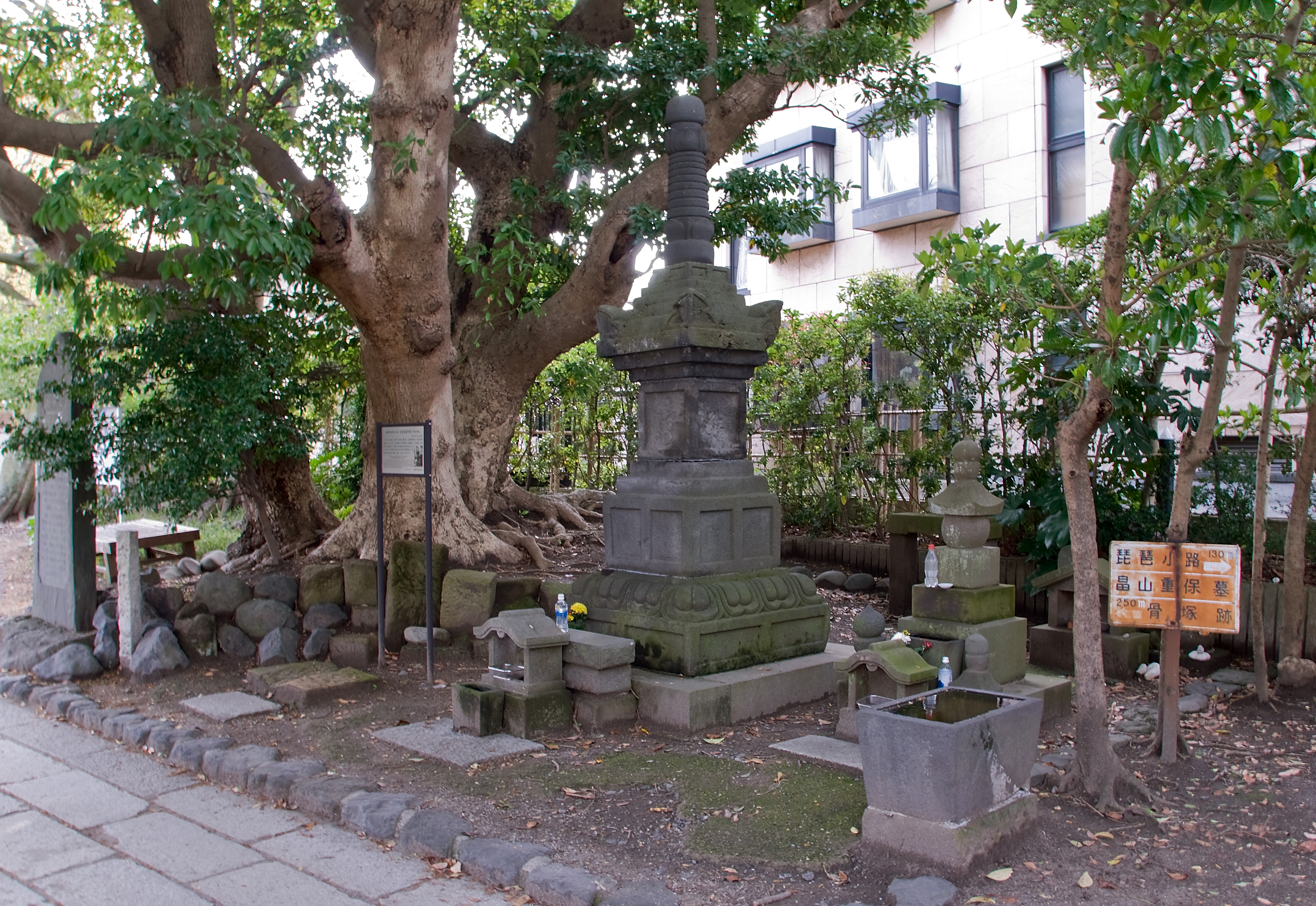
Hatakeyama Shigeyasu's grave and its hōkyōintō

A few meters past Ichi no Torii, on the western sidewalk, is Hatakeyama Shigeyasu's grave, consisting of an imponent hōkyōintō and a black stele erected in the 1920s, which explains the circumstances of his death. Its text reads:

Hatakeyama Shigeyasu's residence
Hatakeyama Shigeyasu was Hatakeyama Shigetada's eldest son. He had had a quarrel with Hiraga Tomomasa, who was Hōjō Tokimasa's son-in-law. Tomomasa hadn't forgotten the fact and so spoke to Tokimasa against both the Hatakeyama. Tokimasa himself hadn't forgotten how Shigetada had, following Minamoto no Yoritomo's will, tried to protect the shōgun's son and heir Yoriie, and was looking for an excuse to kill them. Having received from shōgun Sanetomo the order to arrest the Hatakeyama, he surrounded Shigeyasu's residence with his soldiers. Shigeyasu fought well, but in the end was killed. The day was June 22, 1205, and this is where the residence stood. The day after, Shigetada himself was tricked into going to Musashinokuni's (a region in the north eastern part of Kanagawa) Futamatagawa, where he was killed.
Erected in March 1922 by the Kamakurachō Seinendan

In spite of the traditional attribution, who the grave belongs to is a mystery, and even the year of its construction is uncertain. Nonetheless, because Shigeyasu suffered from asthma and was having an attack when he was killed in battle, the hōkyōintō is popularly known as Rokurō-sama (from Rokurō, his childhood name) and is supposed to have the power to cure colds and cough.

=== Yuigahama ===
Wakamiya Ōji ends next to the Namerigawa's estuary at Yuigahama. During the Kamakura period it was called Maehama (前浜). It was considered sacred to the Minamoto and, before visiting shrines in Izu and Hakone, the shōgun would always descend Wakamiya Ōji to purify his body here.
