= Ōmachi Ōji =

Street in Kamakura, Japan

Coordinates: 35°18′53.03″N 139°33′11.39″E

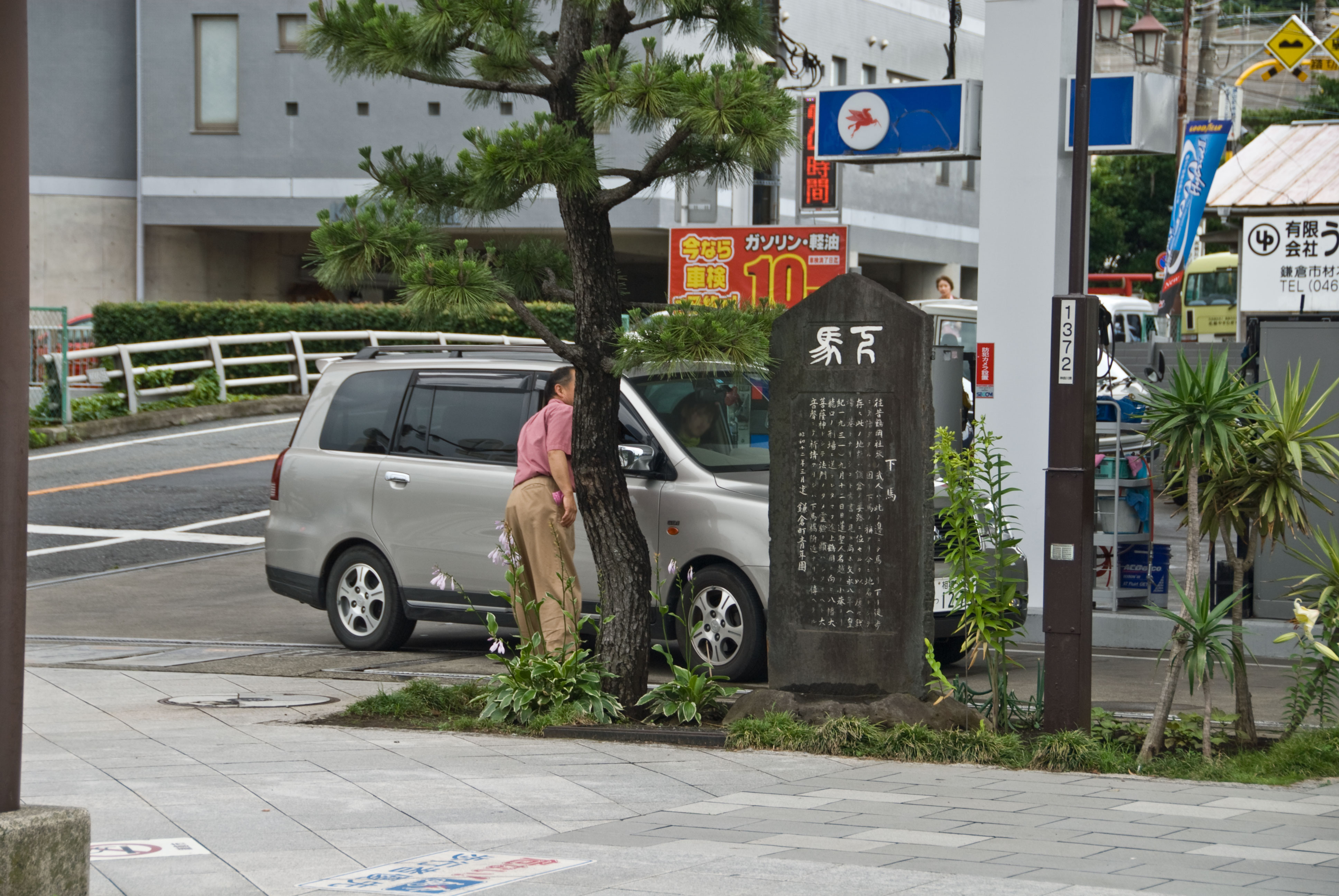
Ōmachi Ōji at Geba

Ōmachi Ōji (大町大路) is the name of a street in Kamakura, Kanagawa, Japan, which begins at Geba Yotsukado and ends at the Nagoshi Pass. It takes its name from the district of Ōmachi, which it crosses. At the time of the shogunate it was the most important road that went from east to west. The entertainment and red-light district of the city used to be at the intersection between Komachi Ōji and Ōmachi Ōji. The branch of the street that from the intersection goes in the opposite direction is called Yuigahama Ōdori (Yuigahama Avenue). On it stand temples like An'yō-in and Ankokuron-ji.
