= Hatakeyama Shigeyasu =

Japanese warrior

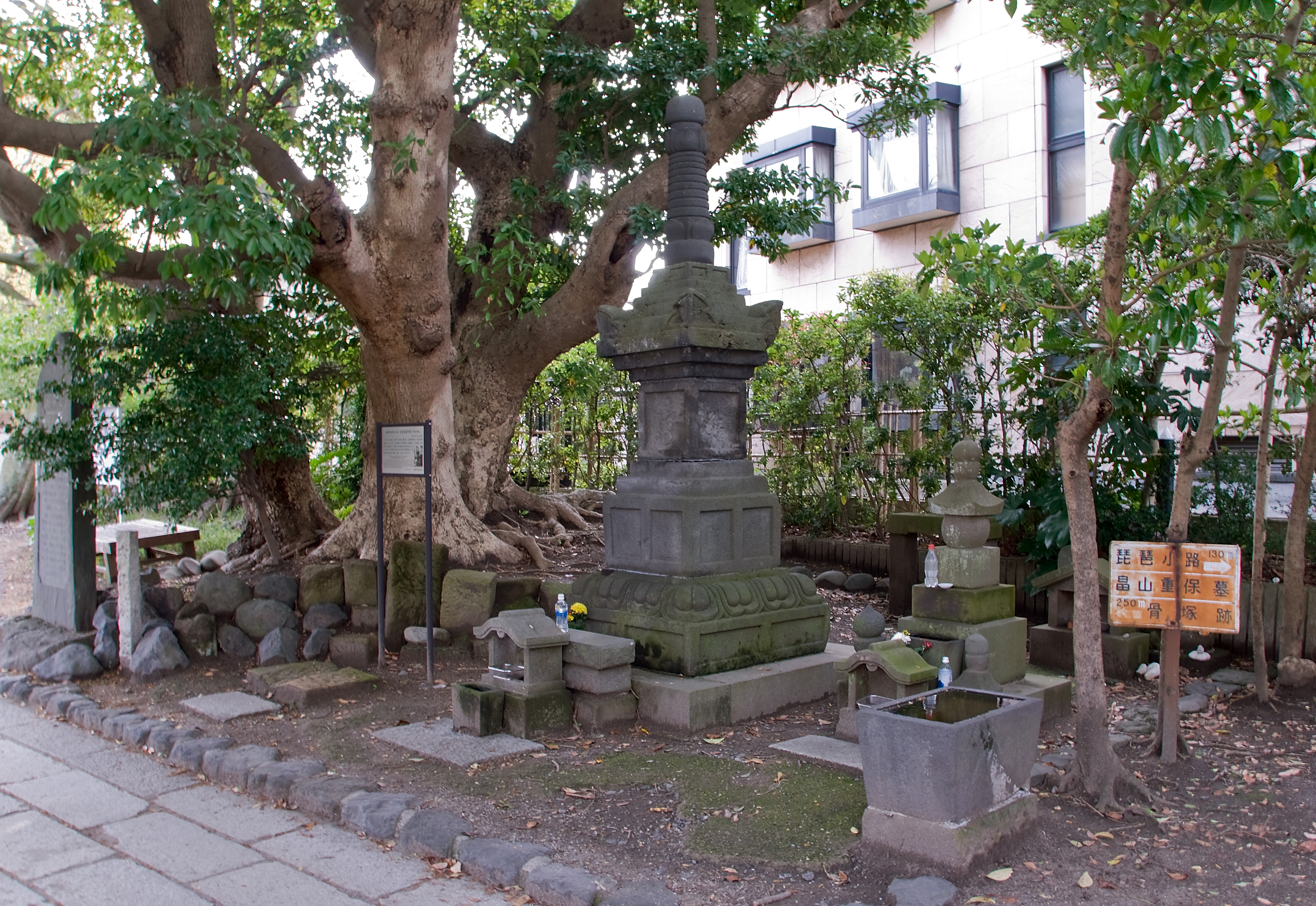
Hatakeyama Shigeyasu's grave and its hōkyōintō.

Hatakeyama Rokurō Shigeyasu (畠山 六郎 重保) was a Kamakura-period warrior who fell victim to political intrigue in 1205.

== Grave and monument ==
According to tradition, his grave can be found under a tabu no ki tree near the Yuigahama end of Wakamiya Ōji Avenue in Kamakura, Kanagawa Prefecture, Japan, next to Tsurugaoka Hachimangū's first torii (Ichi no Torii). This identification likely is due to the grave's location within the former Hatakeyama estate, and to the fact that Shigeyasu is known to have been killed in battle by soldiers of the Hōjō in Yuigahama.

Next to the hōkyōintō stands a black stele (on the left in the photo) erected in 1920, which explains the circumstances of Hatekayama's death. Its text reads:

Hatakeyama Shigeyasu's residence
Hatakeyama Shigeyasu was Hatakeyama Shigetada's eldest son. He had had a quarrel with Hiraga Tomomasa, who was Hōjō Tokimasa's son-in-law. Tomomasa had not forgotten the fact and so spoke to Tokimasa against both the Hatakeyama. Tokimasa himself had not forgotten how Shigetada had, following Minamoto no Yoritomo's will, tried to protect the shōgun's son and heir Yoriie, and was looking for an excuse to kill them. Having received from shōgun Sanetomo the order to arrest the Hatakeyama, he surrounded Shigeyasu's residence with his soldiers. Shigeyasu fought well, but in the end was killed. The day was July 10, 1205, and this is where the residence stood. The day after, Shigetada himself was tricked into going to Musashinokuni's [a region in the north eastern part of Kanagawa] Futamatagawa, where he was killed.
Erected in March 1922 by the Kamakurachō Seinendan

Shigeyasu was one of the samurai who, in December 1204, was chosen to go to Kyoto to pick up shōgun Sanetomo's wife, and it was in that occasion that, at a feast, he had a verbal fight with Hiraga Tomomasa, who was responsible for the capital's defenses. It appears that this fact, plus the hostility existing between Shigetada and Tomomasa, who had neighboring fiefs, offered the Hōjō a pretext to get rid of the Hatakeyama clan, that consequently became extinct. It would be revived later by Hōjō Tokimasa.

== The legend of the Bofuseki ==
Local tradition associates a large rock called Bofuseki (慕夫石, husband-loving rock) on the hill known as Ishikiriyama (石切山), behind Jufuku-ji temple, with Hatakeyama Shigeyasu's wife. According to legend, when Shigeyasu was attacked at Yuigahama, his wife climbed to the top of the hill to see what was happening. Upon learning of his death, her grief was so profound that she turned into stone.

== See also ==
- Hatakeyama clan
