= Hatakeyama Shigeyasu's grave =

Coordinates: 35°18′47.61″N 139°32′54.58″E

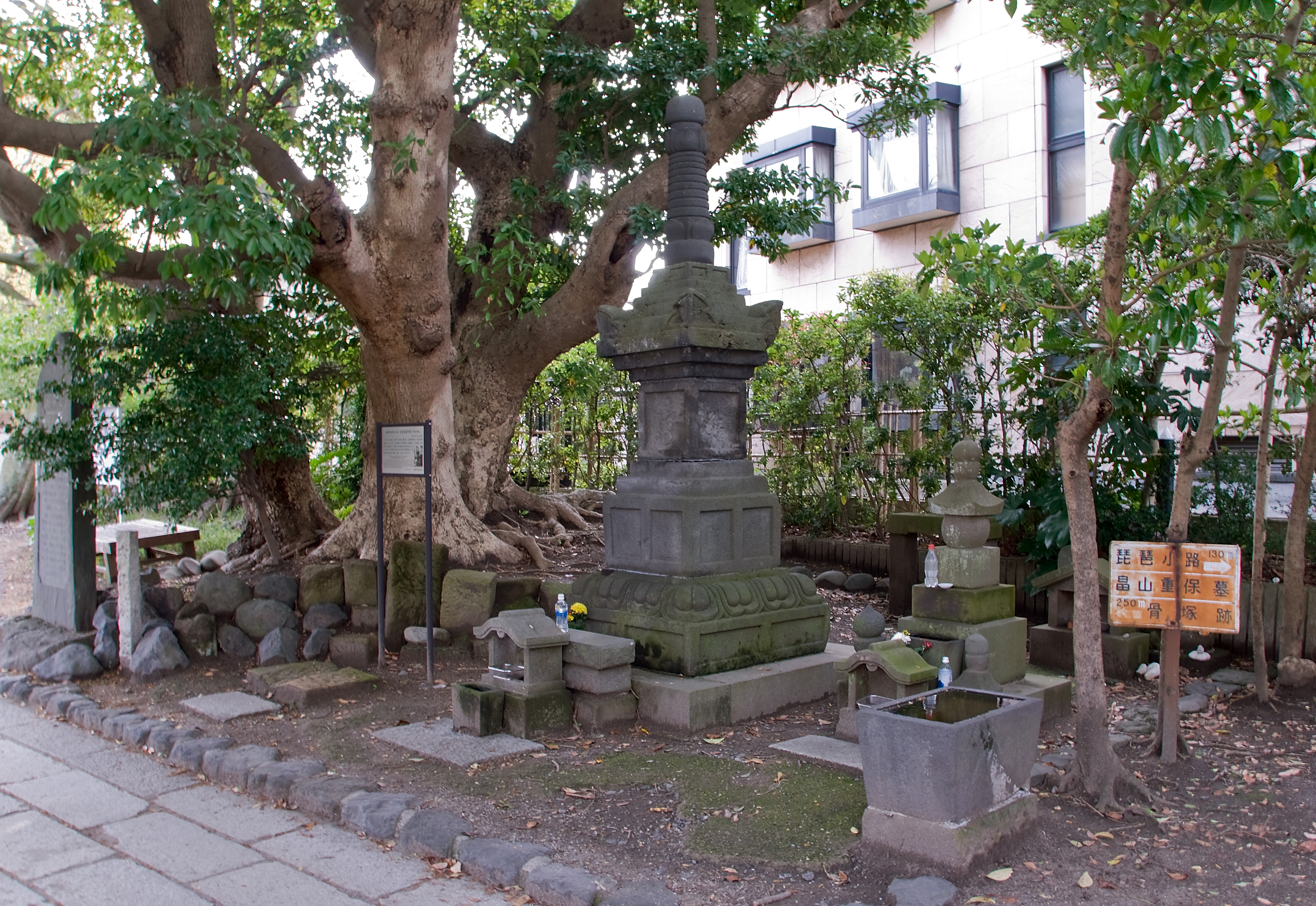
Hatakeyama Shigeyasu's grave and its hōkyōintō.

Hatakeyama Rokurō Shigeyasu (畠山六郎重保) was a Kamakura period warrior who fell victim of political intrigue in 1205. The grave under a tabu no ki tree near the Yuigahama end of Wakamiya Ōji Avenue in Kamakura, Kanagawa Prefecture, Japan and next to Tsurugaoka Hachiman-gū's first torii (Ichi no Torii) is traditionally supposed to be his. It is an Important Cultural Property and a famous example of hōkyōintō (a type of pagoda). Famous for the quality of its manufacture, the hōkyōintō' is 3.45 m tall and is made of andesite.

In spite of its prominence, next to nothing is known about the monument. On the base of the hōkyōintō is carved a date, the fourth year of the Meitoku era (1393), but its manufacture suggests it was built during the Muromachi period (1336–1573). Its upper portion, called sōrin, is very long, in the style prevalent at that time. Also, the relationship between the grave and Hatakeyama Shigeyasu is, the traditional attribution notwithstanding, unclear. The reasons for the attribution are probably that it lies within the former Hatakeyama estate, and that Shigeyasu is known to have been killed in battle by Hōjō soldiery in Yuigahama.

Next to the hōkyōintō stands a black stele (on the left in the photo) erected in the 1920s, which is, however, only indirectly related to the grave. Its text says:

Hatakeyama Shigeyasu's residence
Hatakeyama Shigeyasu was Hatakeyama Shigetada's eldest son. He had had a quarrel with Hiraga Tomomasa, who was Hōjō Tokimasa's son-in-law. Tomomasa hadn't forgotten the fact and so spoke to Tokimasa against both the Hatakeyama. Tokimasa himself hadn't forgotten how Shigetada had, following Minamoto no Yoritomo's will, tried to protect the shogun's son and heir Yoriie, and was looking for an excuse to kill them. Having received an order to that effect from shogun Sanetomo, he surrounded Shigeyasu's residence with his soldiers. Shigeyasu fought well, but in the end was killed. The day was June 22, 1205. and this is where the residence stood. The day after, Shigetada himself was tricked into going to Musashinokuni's (a region in the north eastern part of Kanagawa) Futamatagawa, where he was killed.
Erected in March 1922 by the Kamakurachō Seinendan

Because Shigeyasu suffered from asthma and was having an attack when he was killed in battle, the hōkyōintō is popularly known as Rokurō-sama and is supposed to have the power to cure colds and coughs.
