= Taisan-ji (Kobe) =

Buddhist temple in Hyōgo Prefecture, Japan

Coordinates: 34.6965°N 135.067°E

Sanshinzan Taisan-ji
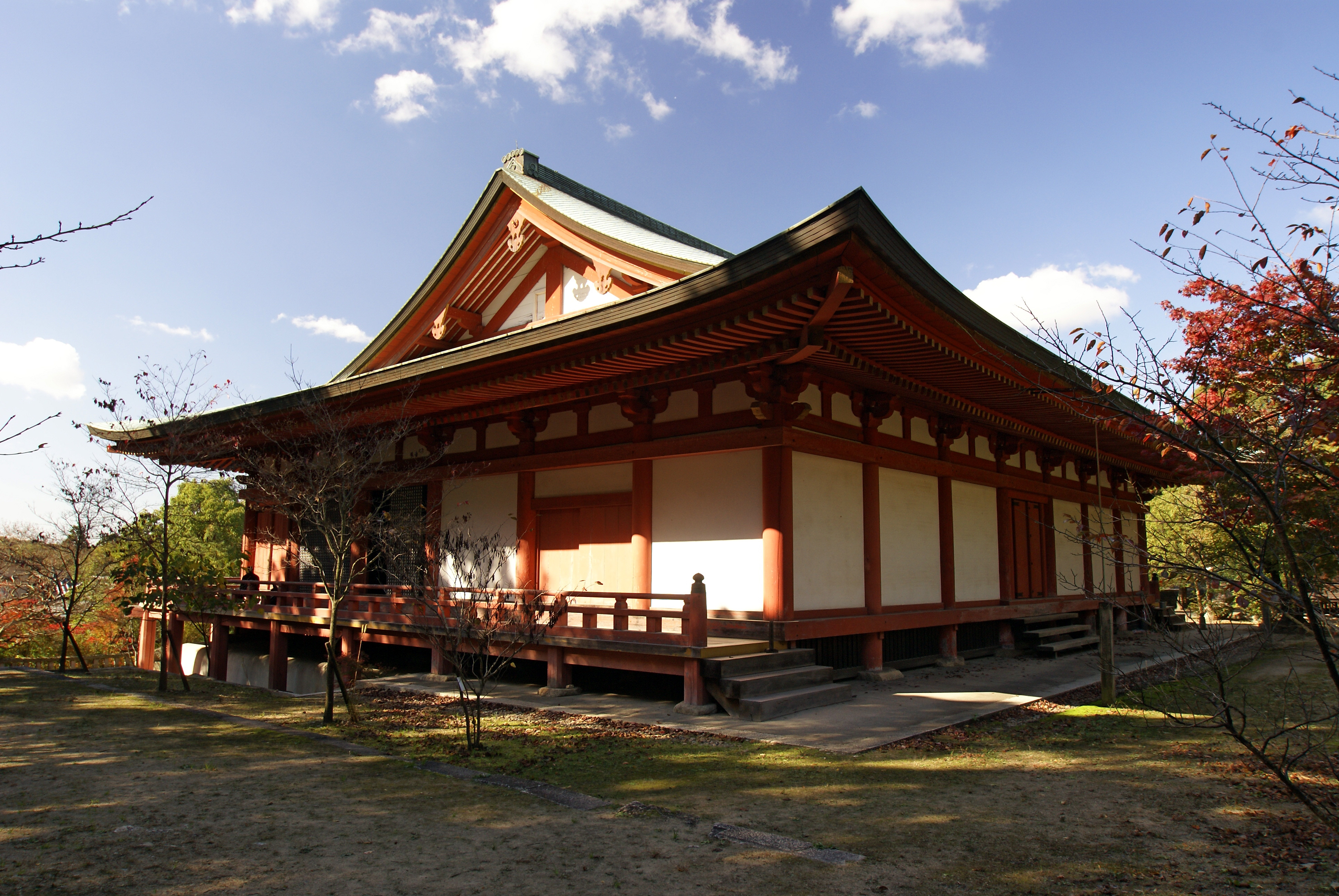
- Main hall

Religion
- Affiliation: Tendai

Location
- Location: 224, Zenkai, Igawadani, Nishi-ku, Kobe, Hyogo 651-2108
- Country: Japan
- Interactive map of Sanshinzan Taisan-ji

Architecture
- Founder: Umakai Fujiwara
- Completed: 716

Website
- https://www.do-main.co.jp/taisanji/

Sanshinzan Taisan-ji (三身山太山寺) is a temple of the Tendai sect in Kobe, Hyōgo, Japan. It was established by Empress Genshō's instruction in 716.

Taisan-ji's Main Hall completed in 1293 is a National Treasure of Japan.

== Building list ==
- Main Hall - National Treasure of Japan. It was rebuilt in 1293.
- Sanmon (Niō Gate) - Important Cultural Property. It was rebuilt in Muromachi period.
- Pagoda - It was built in 1688.
- Amidadō - It was built in 1688.
- Gomadō - It was built in Edo period
- Shakadō - It was built in Edo period
- Rakandō - It was built in Edo period
- Kannondō
- Bell tower

== Tatchu temples (Branch) ==
- An'yō-in - It's Karesansui is Japan's Places of Scenic Beauty.
- Jōju-in
- Ryuzō-in
- Henjō-in
- Kanki-in

== See also ==
- National Treasures of Japan
  - List of National Treasures of Japan (temples)

== Gallery ==
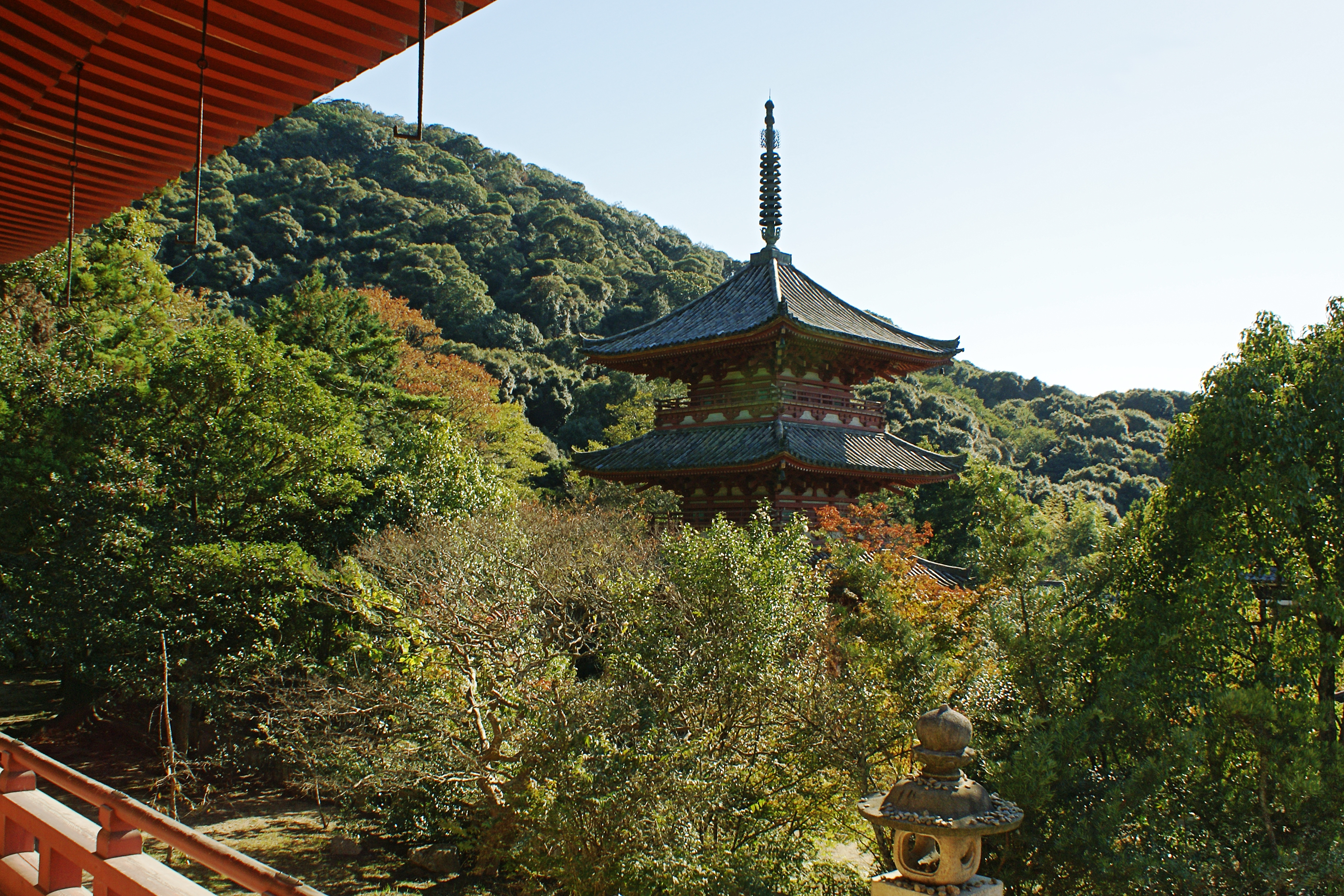
Pagoda

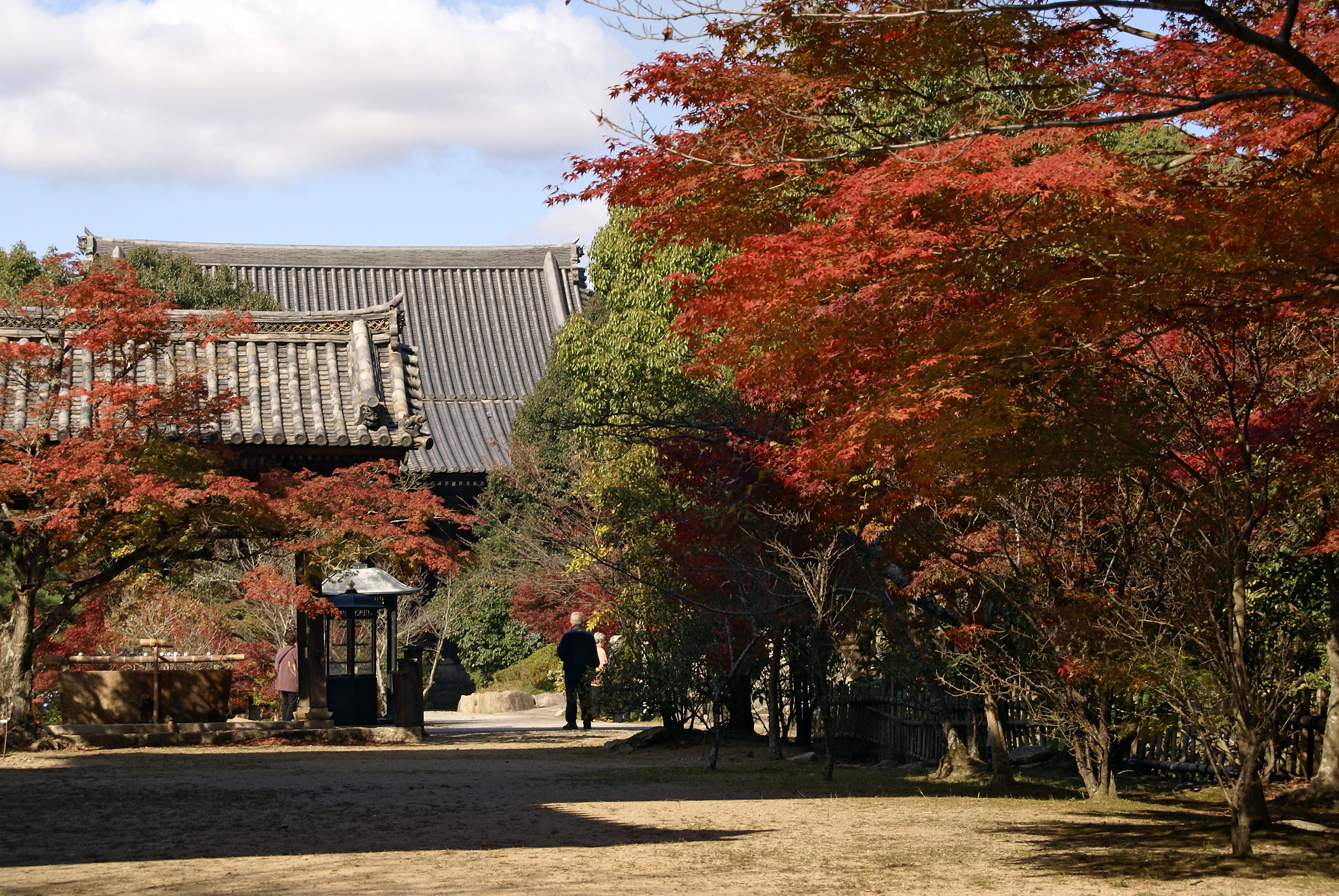
Amidado

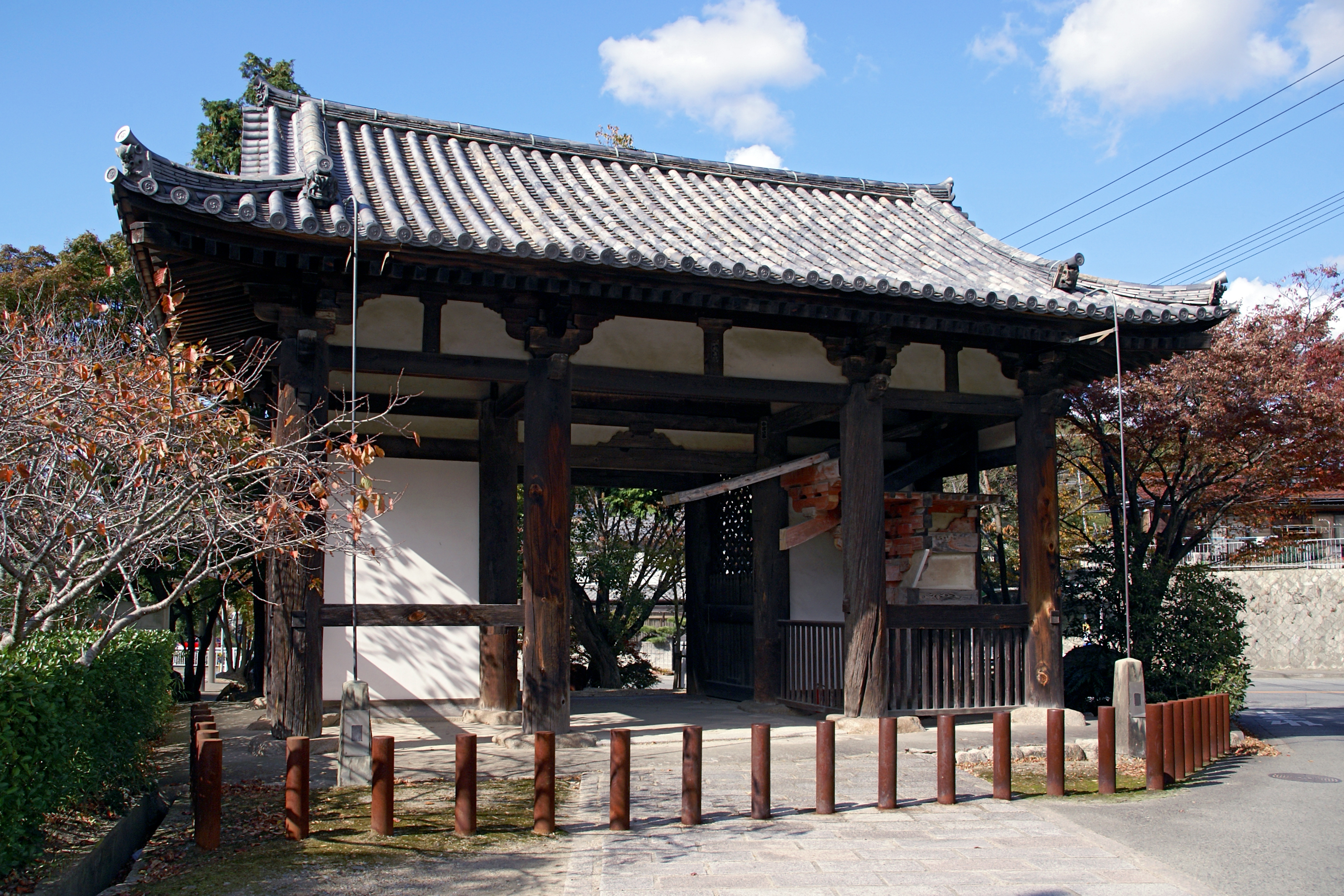
Sanmon (Nio Gate)

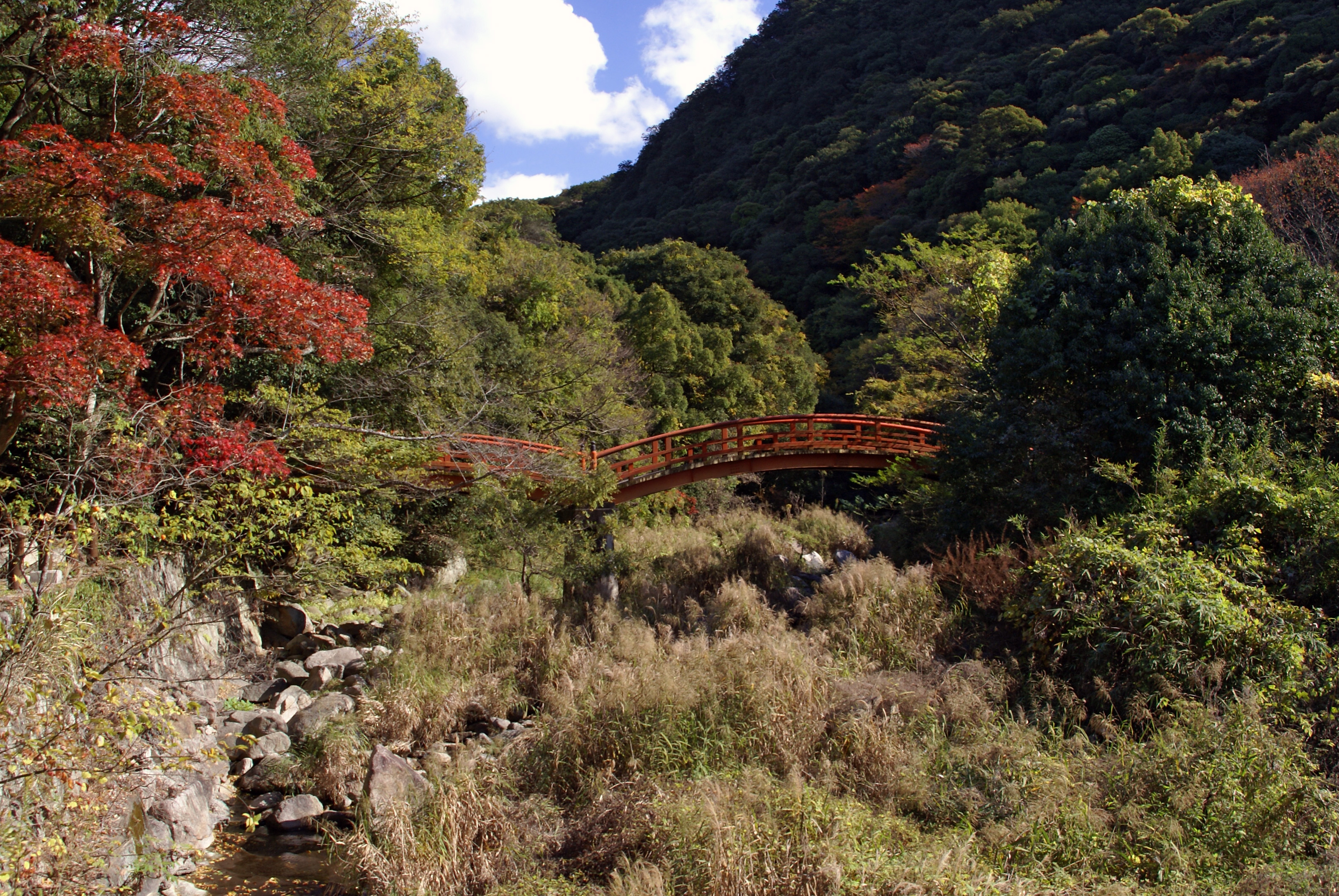
Oku-no-in

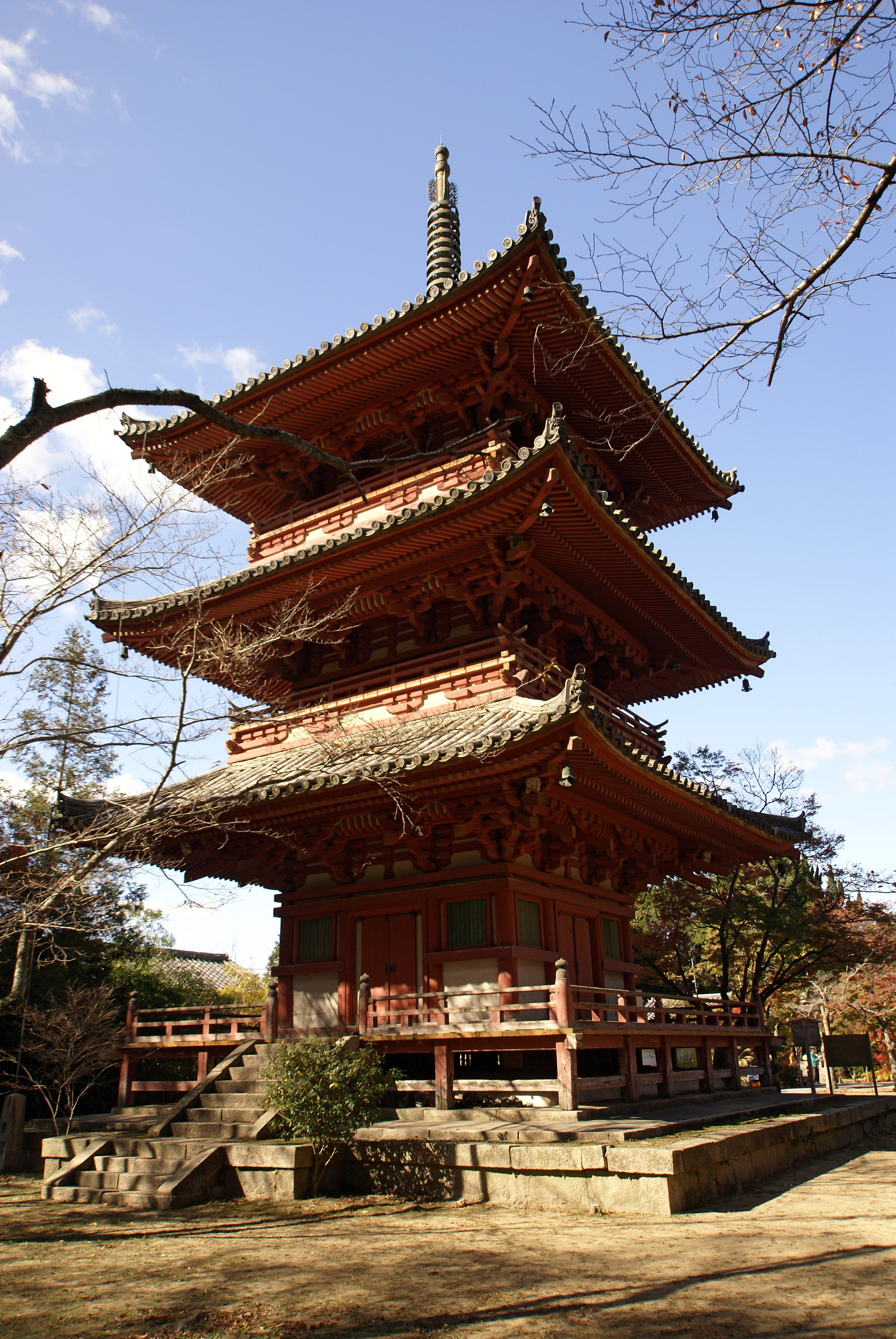
Pagoda
