= Yoko Ōji =

Coordinates: 35°19′25.75″N 139°33′18.13″E

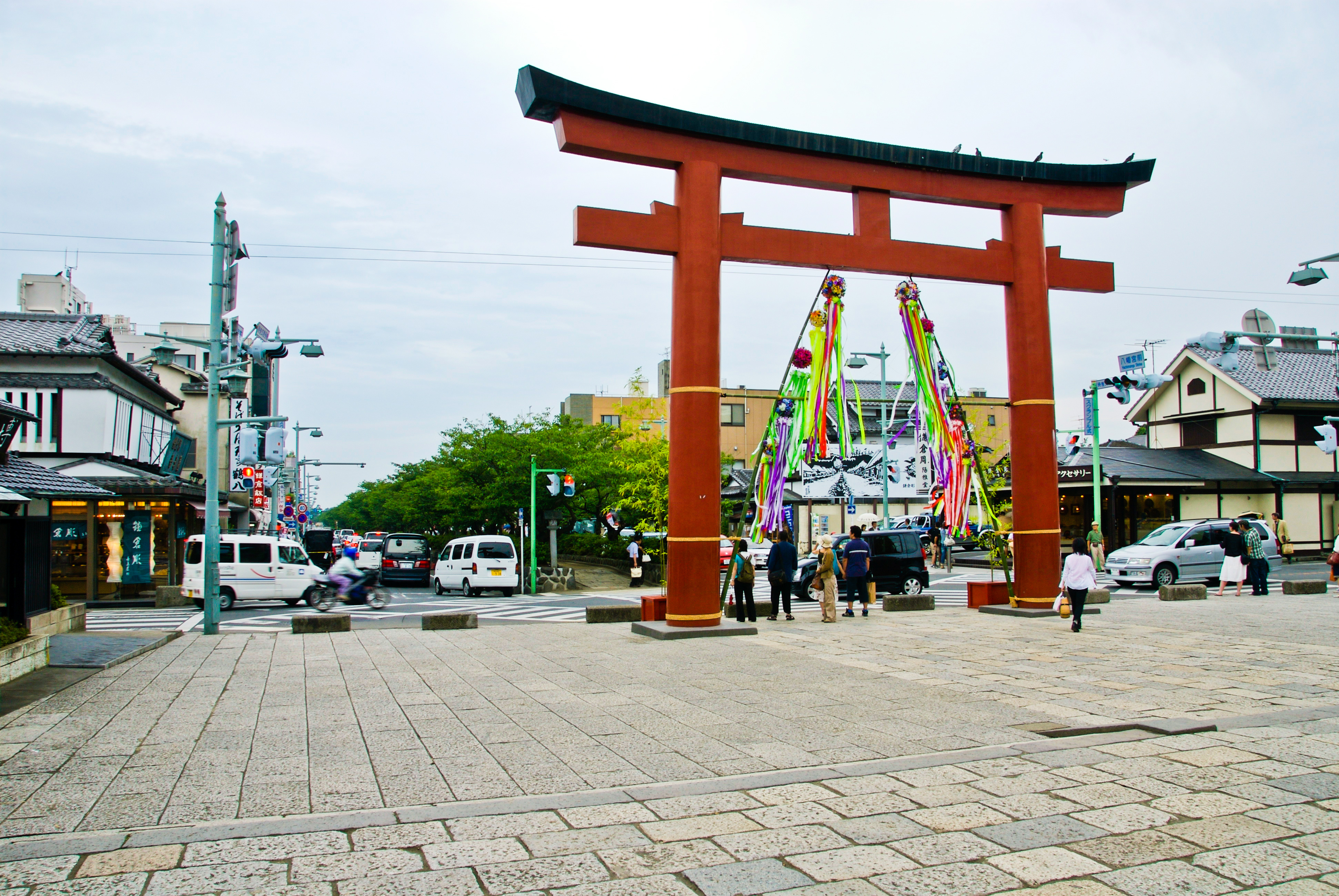
Yoko Ōji, Wakamiya Ōji and Tsurugaoka Hachiman-gū's torii

Yoko Ōji (横大路) is the name of a short street in Kamakura, Kanagawa, Japan, which begins in front of Tsurugaoka Hachiman-gū, the city's most important Shinto shrine and ends in front of Hōkai-ji. It is believed to be the street that passed in front of the so-called Ōkura Bakufu, seat of first shōgun Minamoto no Yoritomo's first government, which was in turn a section of the old Kanazawa Kaidō.
