= An'yō-in (Kobe) =

Buddhist temple in Kobe, Japan

Coordinates: 34.6965°N 135.067°E

Taisan-ji An'yō-in
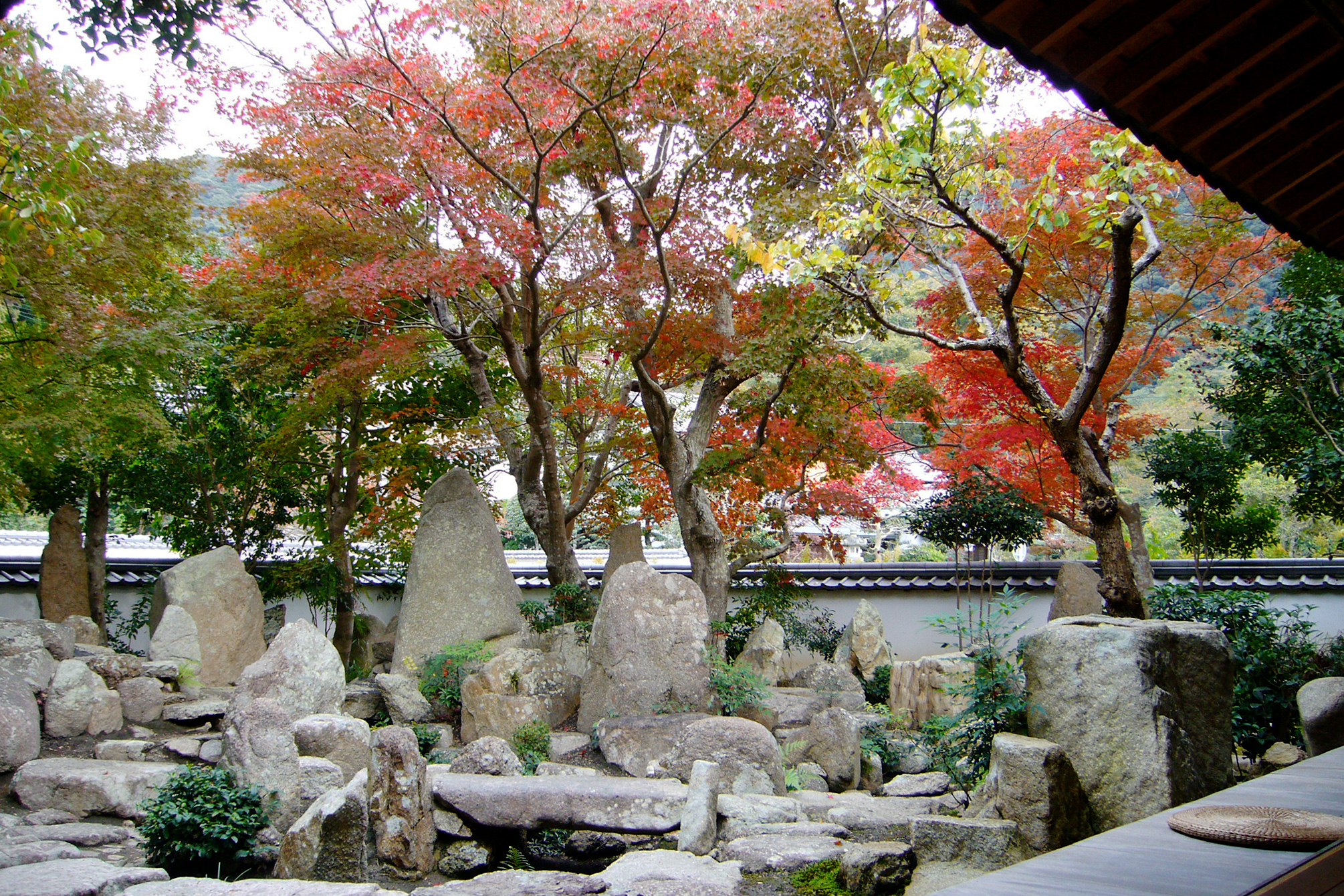

Religion
- Affiliation: Tendai

Location
- Location: Zenkai, Igawadani, Nishi-ku, Kobe, Hyogo 651-2108
- Country: Japan
- Interactive map of Taisan-ji An'yō-in

Website
- www.do-main.co.jp/taisanji

Taisan-ji An'yō-in (太山寺 安養院) is a temple of the Tendai sect in Kobe, Hyōgo Prefecture, Japan.

It was created as a tatchu temple (branch) in Taisan-ji.

An'yō-in's karesansui completed in Azuchi–Momoyama period is a national Place of Scenic Beauty.

== Building list ==
- Shoin: It was built in the 1730s.
- Sanmon
- Karesansui

== See also ==
- Japanese garden

== Gallery ==
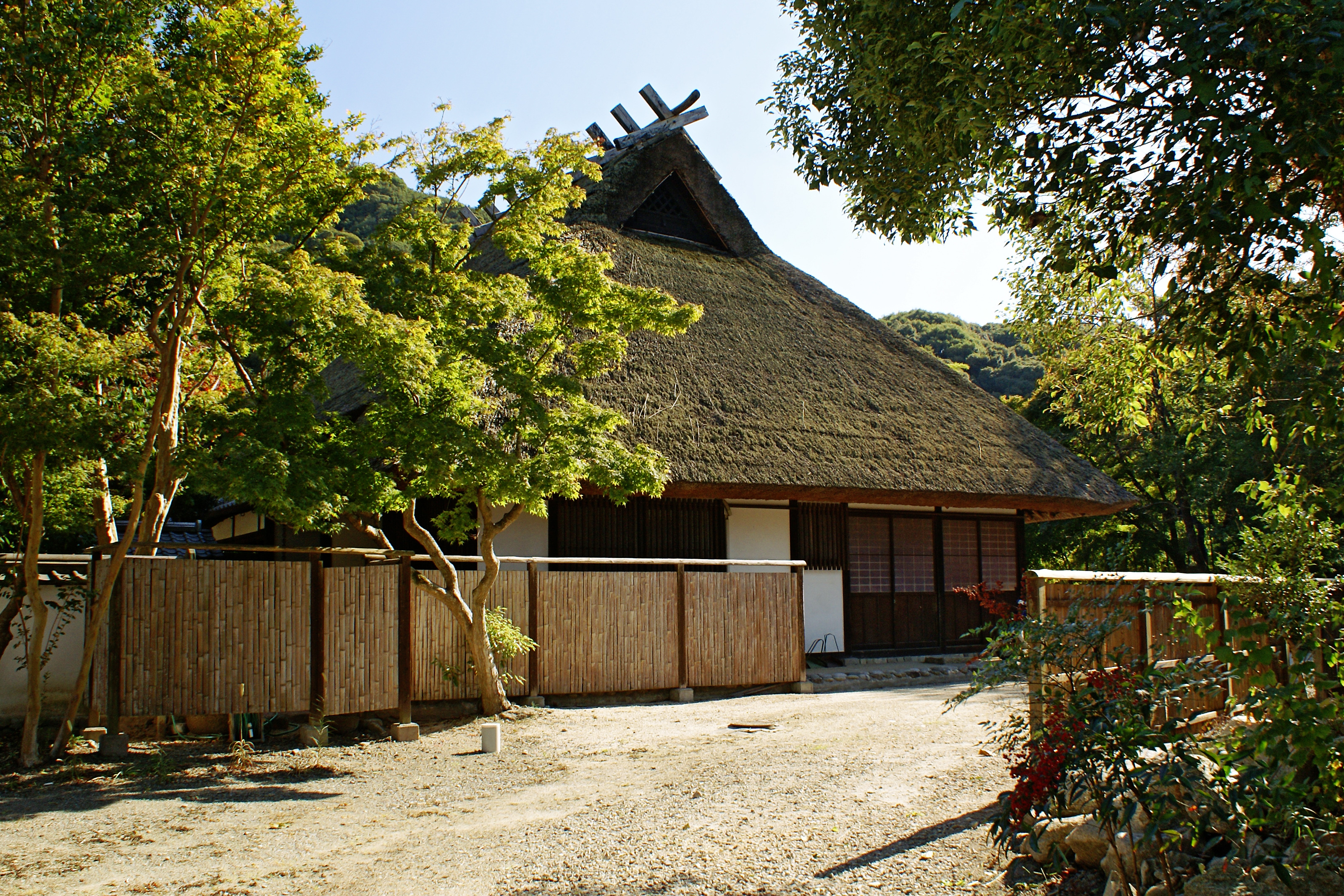
Shoin

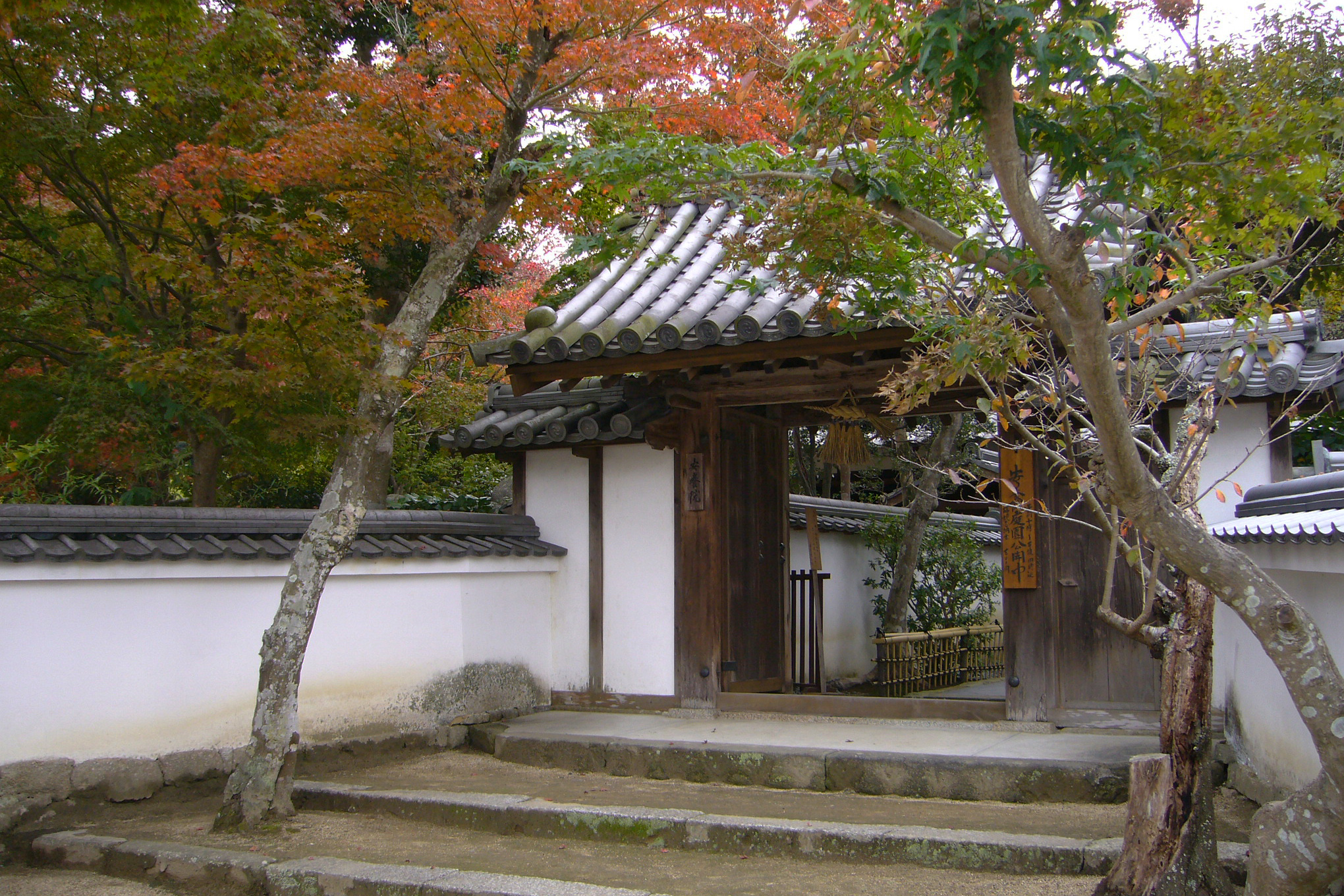
Sanmon

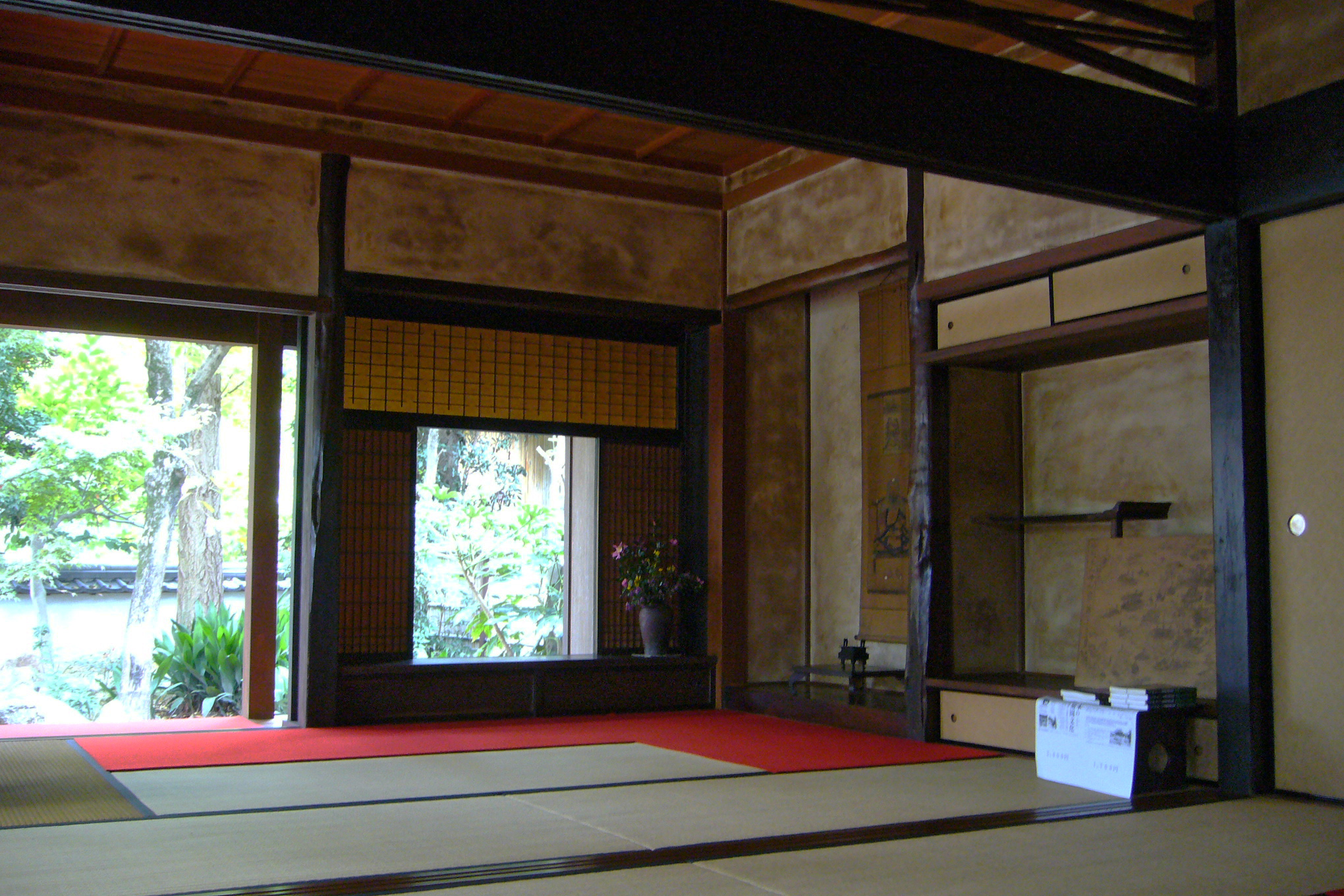
Shoin

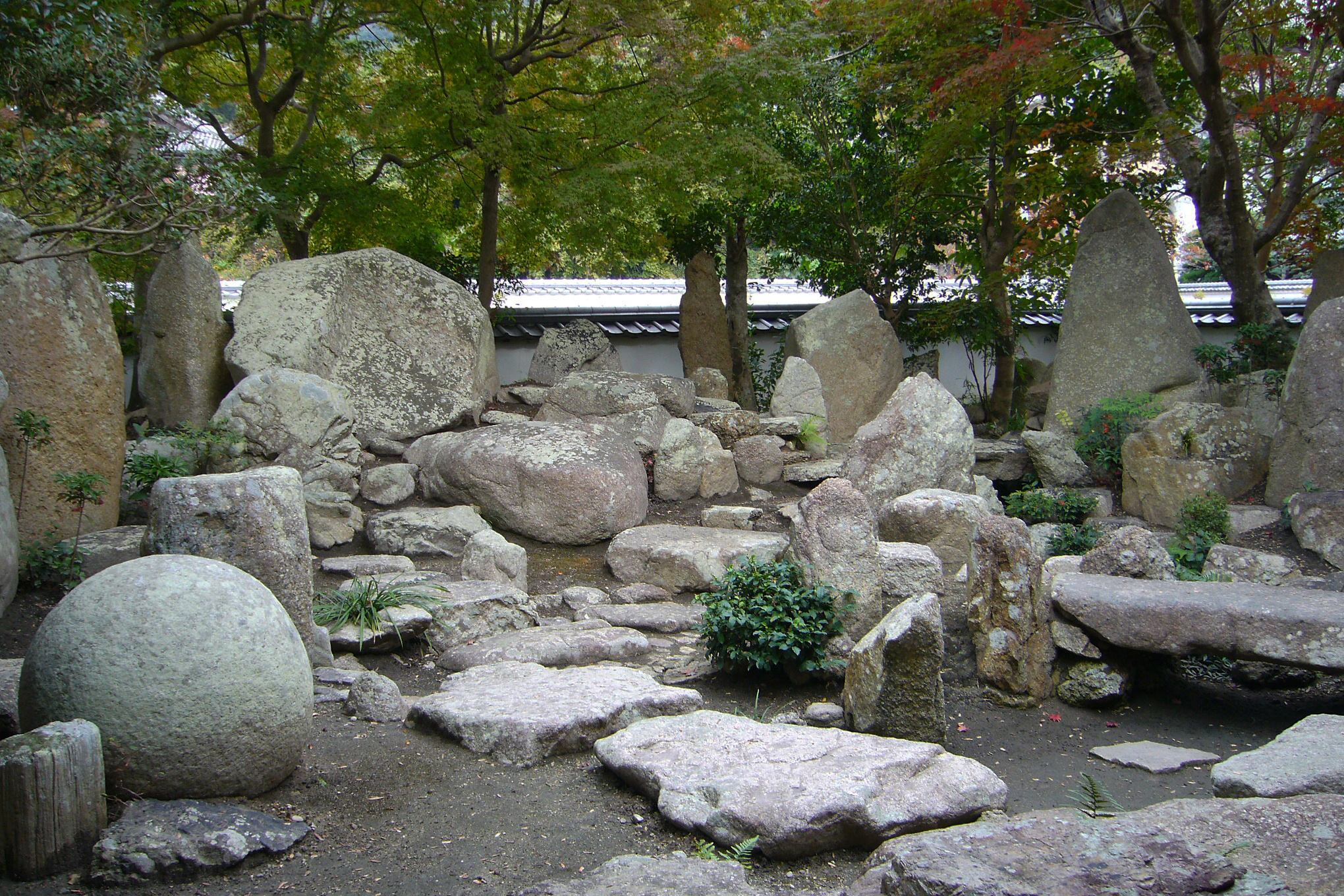
Karesansui
