= Kaigen Sōzuki =

The Kaigen Sōzuki (快元僧都記) is a diary written by Buddhist priest Kaigen that contains records written between 1532 and 1542, mainly of the restoration of Tsurugaoka Hachiman-gū ordered by Hōjō Ujitsuna. It describes in great detail the work, its organization and the actions of the later Hōjō clan during that period.
