= Komachi (Kanagawa) =

Coordinates: 35°19′6.92″N 139°33′7.87″E

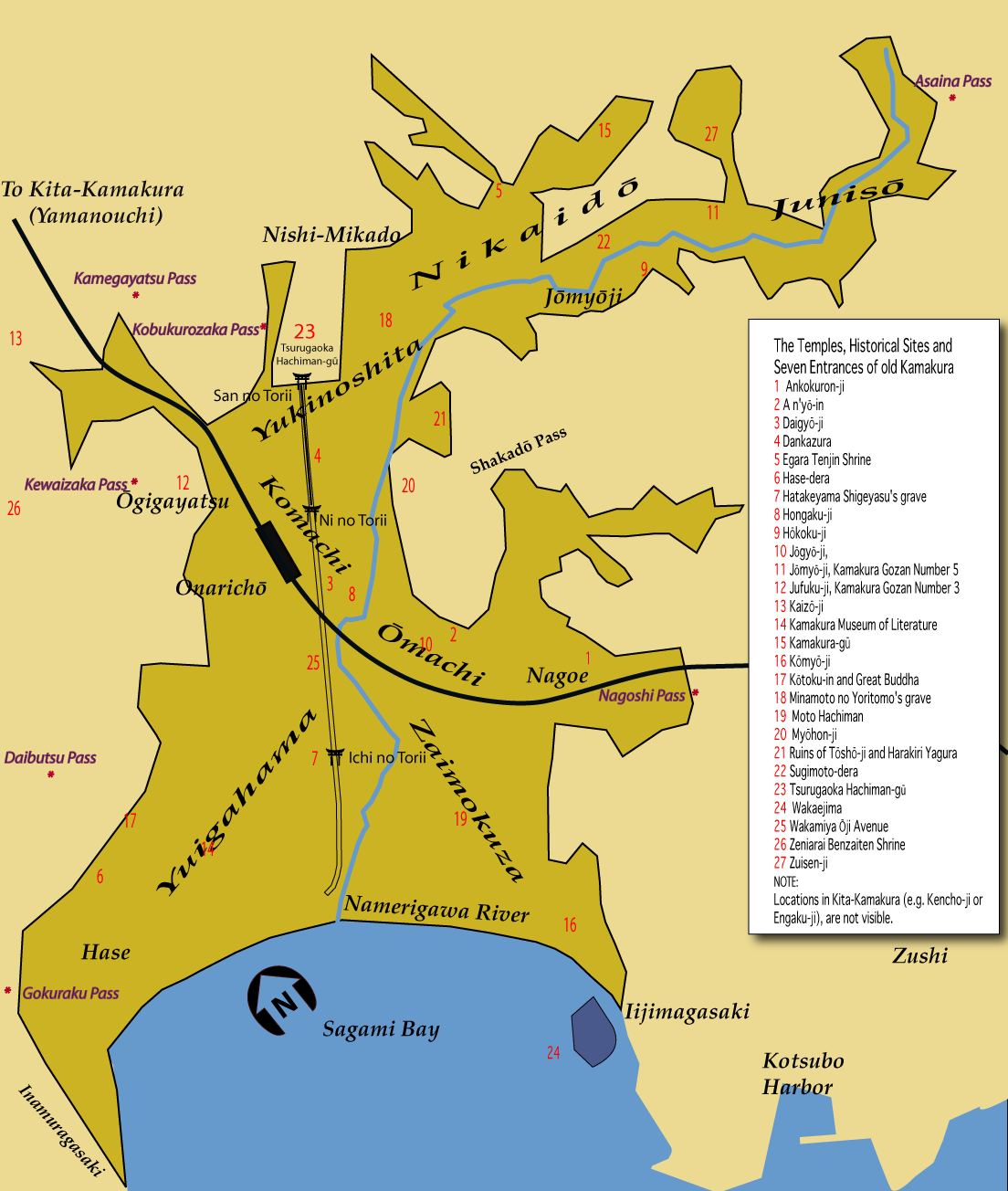
A map of Kamakura with the approximate location of the most important historical sites

Komachi (小町, Small Town) is a locality (a machi or chō (町)) in Kamakura, Kanagawa prefecture, Japan, defined as the part of town north of the Ebisubashi bridge on the Namerigawa. The part of town south of the same bridge is called Ōmachi (大町, Big Town).
