= An'yō-in (Kamakura) =

Buddhist temple in Kanagawa, Japan

An’yō-in
- 安養院
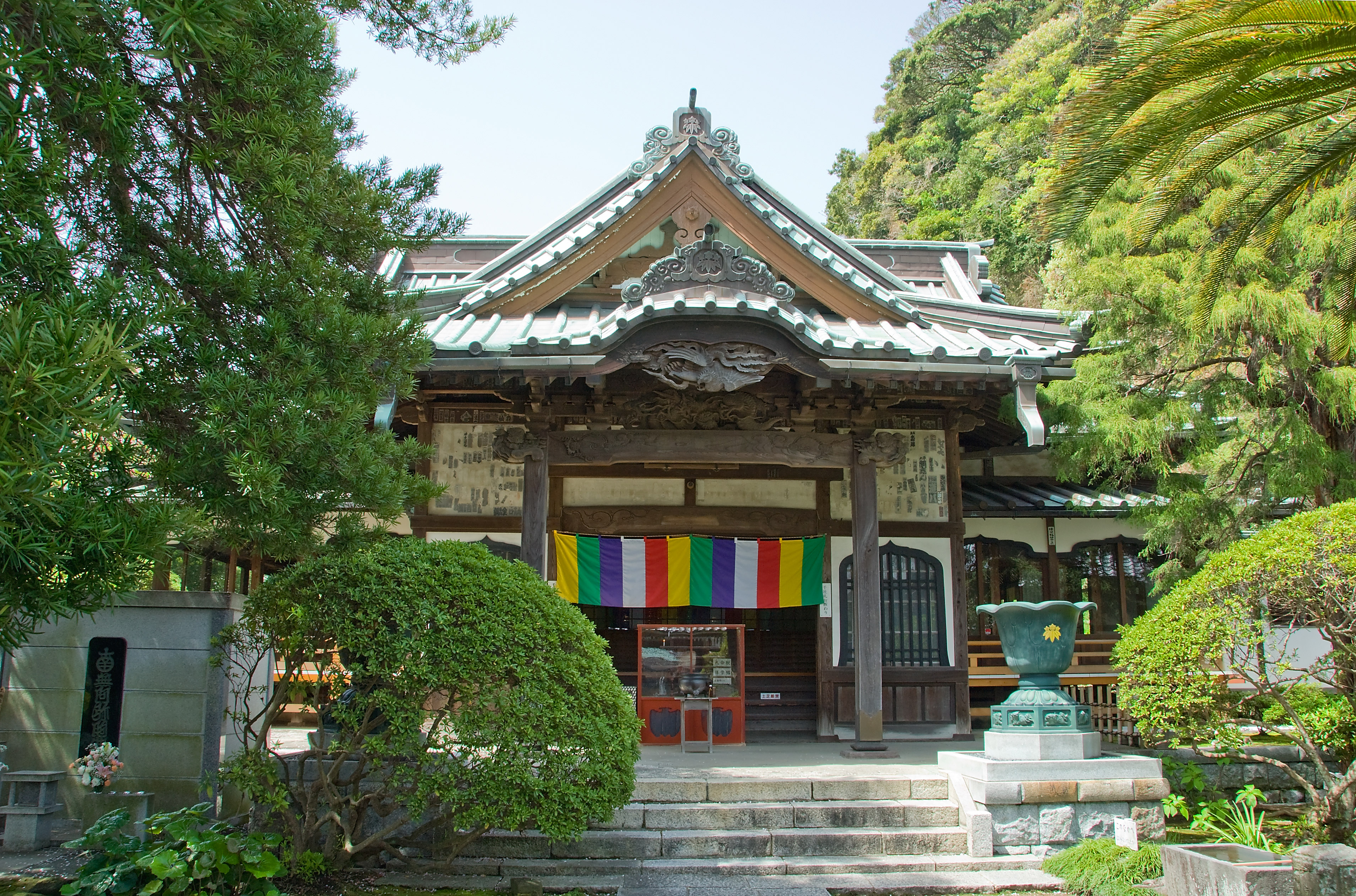
- Hondō of An'yō-in

- Location within Kanagawa Prefecture Location within Japan

Religion
- Affiliation: Buddhist
- Deity: Amida Nyorai
- Rite: Jōdo

Location
- Location: 3-1-22 Ōmachi, Kamakura-shi, Kanagawa-ken
- Country: Japan
- Interactive map of An’yō-in
- Coordinates: 35°18′51″N 139°33′19″E

Architecture
- Founder: Hōjō Masako
- Completed: 1225
- National Important Cultural Property

An’yō-in (安養院) is a Buddhist temple located in the Ōmachi neighborhood of the city of Kamakura, Kanagawa Prefecture, Japan. The temple's full name is Gionzan An'yō-in Chōraku-ji (祇園山安養院長楽寺). It belongs to the Jōdo shū sect and its honzon is a statue of Amida Nyorai; however, the temple is more famous for enshrining an image of Senjū Kannon Bosatsu ( Sahasrabhūja), which makes it the 4th stop on the Bandō Sanjūsankasho pilgrimage route. It is also called the "Tashirō Kannon".

== History ==
This temple has a complex history and is the result of the fusion of three separate temples called Chōraku-ji, Zendō-ji and Tashiro-ji. It was first opened in 1225 as Chōraku-ji in the Hase Sasame-ga-yatsu neighborhood of Kamakura by Hōjō Masako for as a memorial temple for her husband Minamoto no Yoritomo, founder of the Kamakura shogunate. On her death, it became her memorial temple as well, with a chapel called An'yō-in (after Hōjō Masako's posthumous name) erected in its grounds. At the time it was a Ritsu sect temple. It was burned to the ground by Nitta Yoshisada's forces in 1333 at the fall of the Kamakura shogunate. Another temple destroyed in the Battle of Kamakura was Zendō-ji, once an important temple in the Nagoe neighborhood of Kamakura. The remnants of the two temples were amalgamated under the sponsorship of Kōmyō-ji on this location, but the combined temple burned down again in 1680. It was once more rebuilt, as this time amalgamated with the remnants of a temple called Tashiro-ji that was located the Hiki-ga-yatsu neighborhood of Kamakura, and which had burned down around the same time. The honzon of Tashiro-ji was a statue of Senjū Kannon, which had placed the temple on the Bandō Sanjūsankasho pilgrimage route.

The great Chinese black pine in the garden is over 700 years old. Behind the temple there are two hōkyōintō. The smallest is one of Hōjō Masako's possible graves. In the temple's small cemetery down the alley in front of the temple's gate rests famous film director Akira Kurosawa.

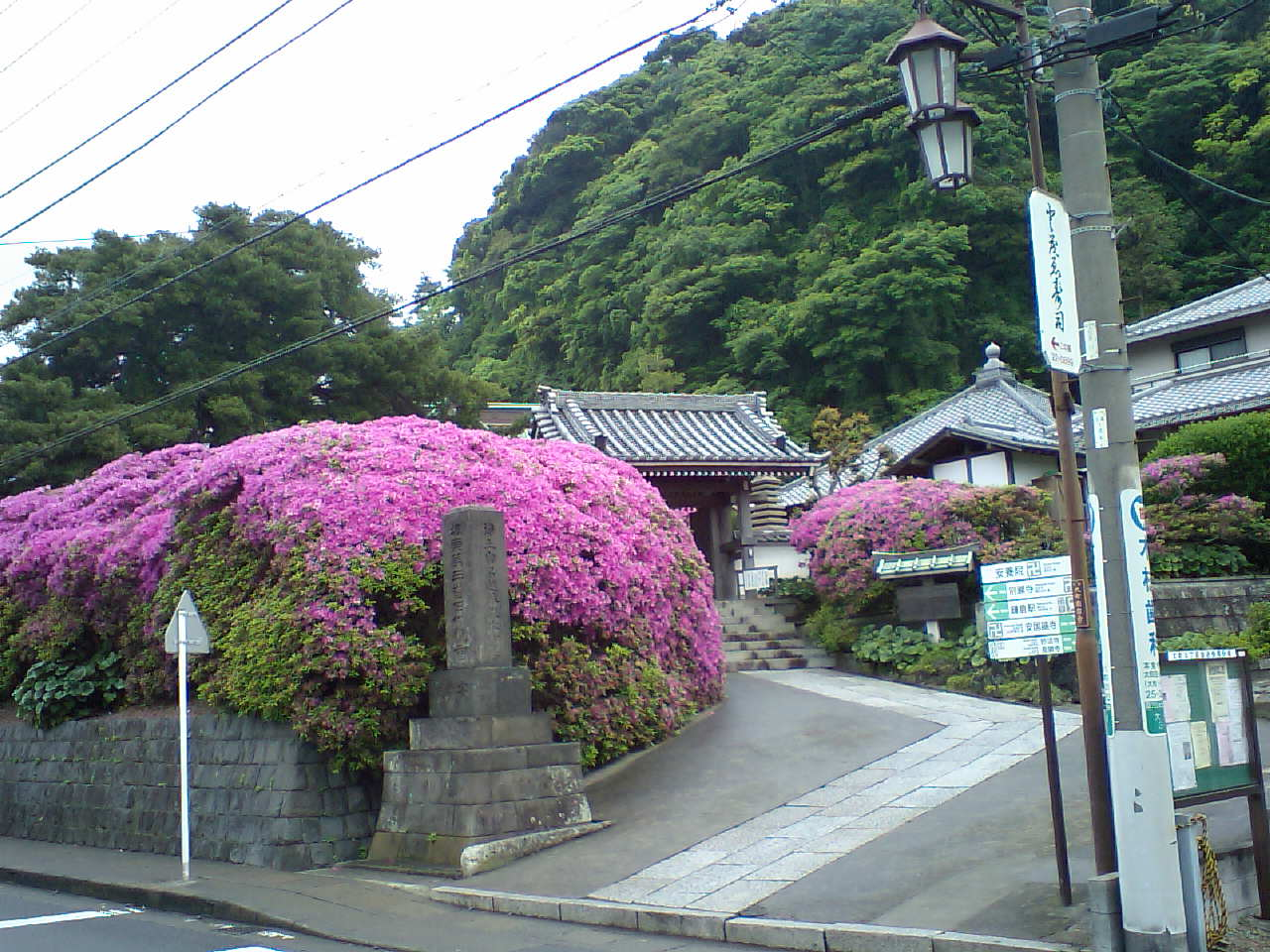
An'yo-in is noted for its rhododendrons.

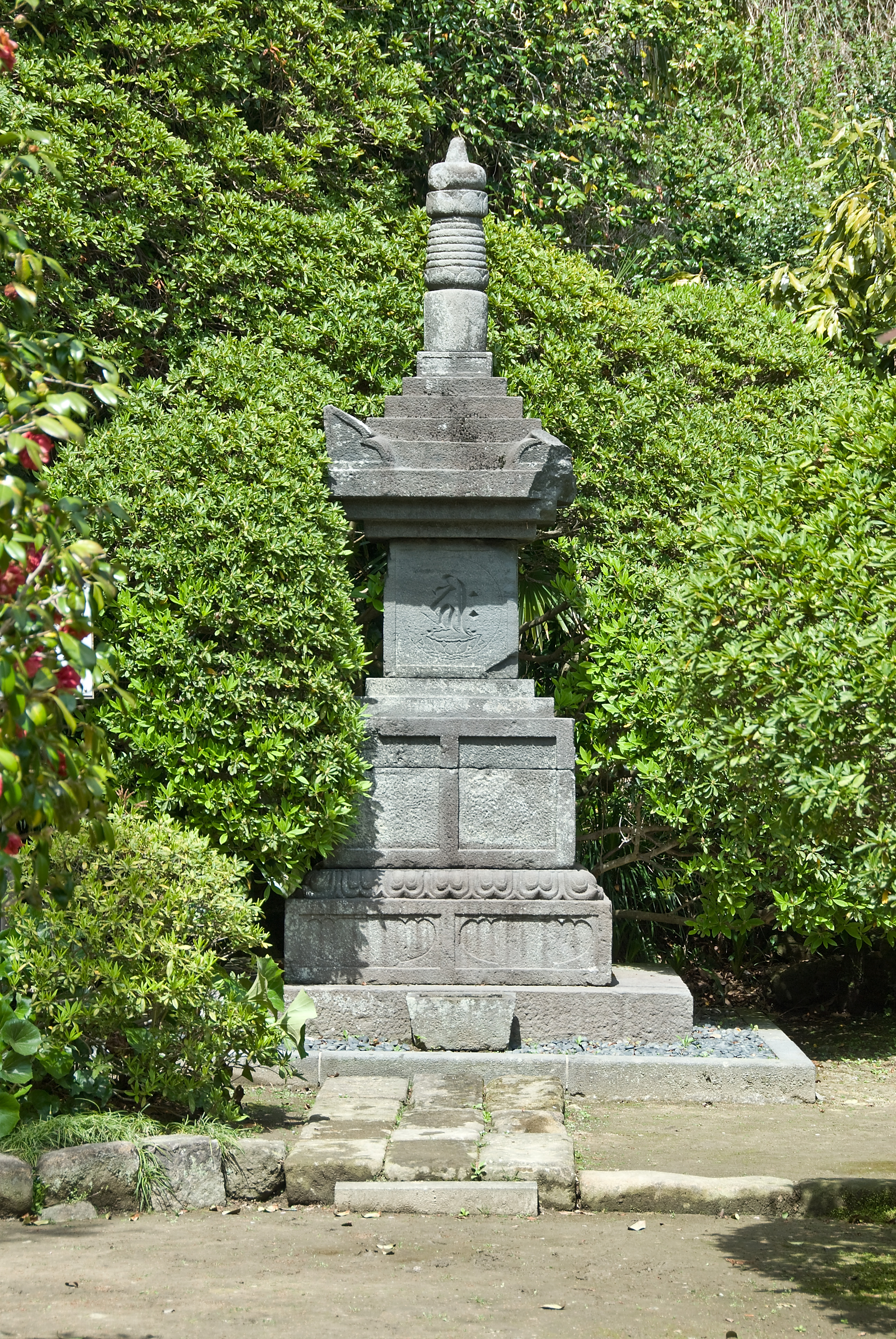
Hōkyōintō (ICP)

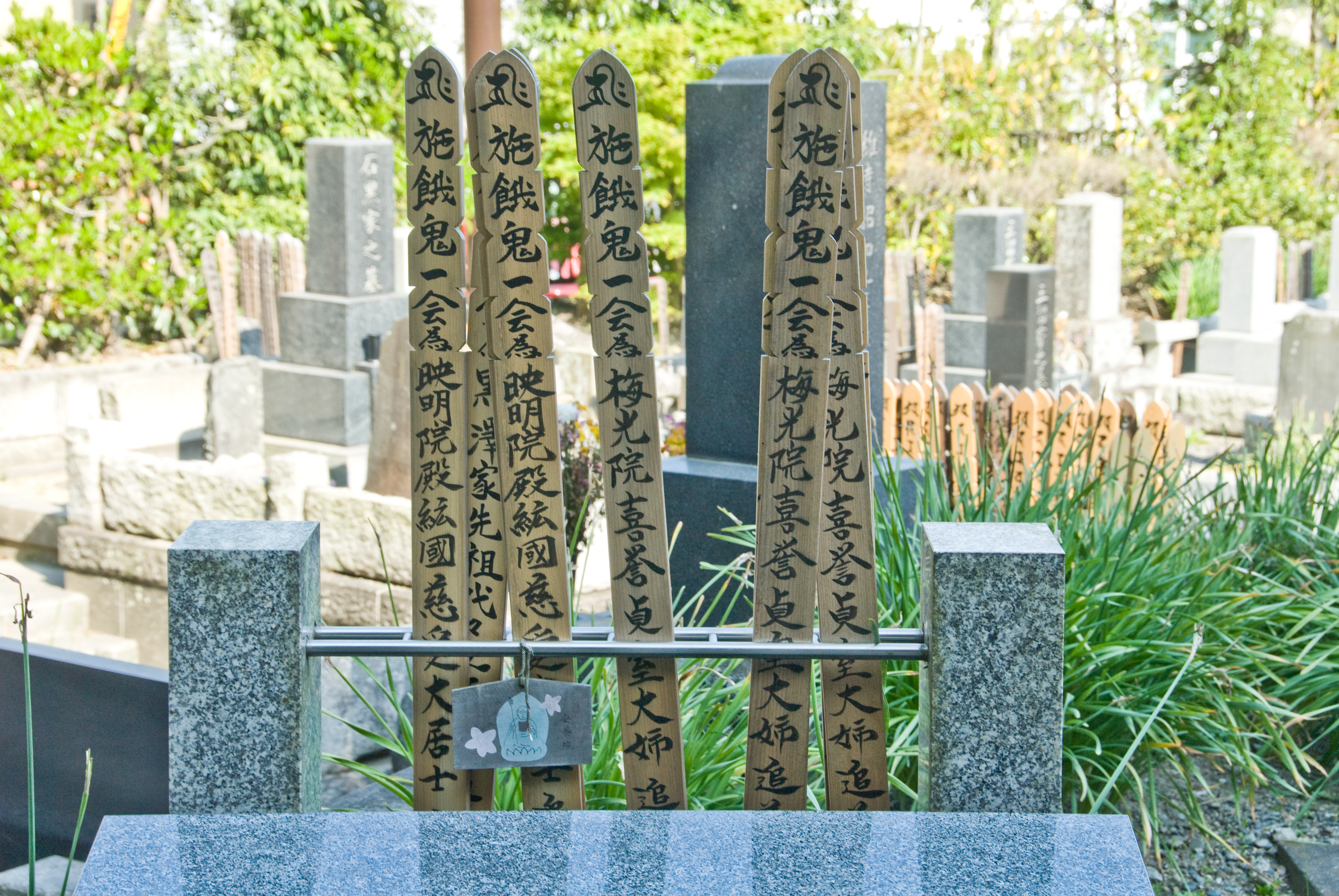
Grave of Kurosawa Akira

== Cultural Properties ==
=== National Important Cultural Properties ===
- Hōkyōintō (安養院宝篋印塔), Kamakura period, dated 1308, it is the oldest known hōkyōintō in Kamakura. However, the filial at the top of the monument is a later reconstruction.

=== Kamakura City Tangible Cultural Properties ===
- Statue of Gangyōbō Enman Shōnin (木造 願行房円満上人坐像), Kamakura period; Wooden, seated statue of the founding priest of Zendō-ji.
