= Ōmachi (Kanagawa) =

Coordinates: 35°18′50.13″N 139°33′15.50″E

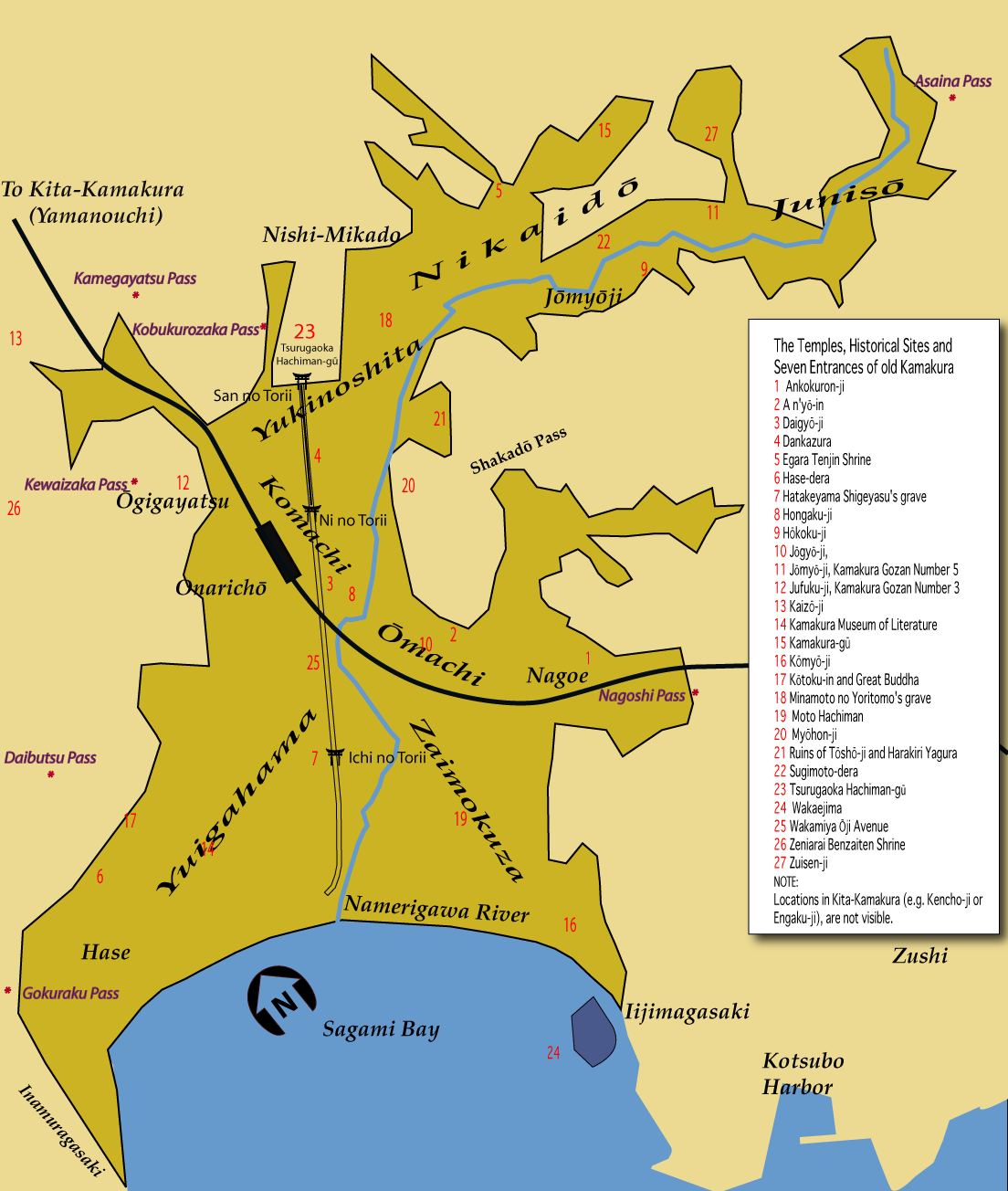
A map of Kamakura, Kanagawa

Ōmachi (大町, Big Town) is a locality (a machi or chō (町)) in Kamakura, Kanagawa prefecture, Japan, defined as the part of town south of the Ebisubashi bridge on the Namerigawa. The part of town north of the same bridge is called Komachi (小町, Small Town).
