= List of historic sites of Japan (Kanagawa) =

List of Historic Sites of Japan

This list is of the historic sites of Japan located within the Prefecture of Kanagawa.

== National Historic Sites ==
As of 1 August 2019, sixty-three Sites have been designated as being of national significance, including the Old Hakone Road, which spans the prefectural borders with Shizuoka.

Site	Municipality	Comments	Image	Coordinates	Type	Ref.
Isehara Hachimandai Stone Age Dwelling Site 伊勢原八幡台石器時代住居跡 Isehara Hachimandai sekki-jidai jūkyo ato	Isehara	Jomon period settlement trace		35°23′20″N 139°18′31″E	1	792
Isshōmasu Site 一升桝遺跡 Isshōmasu iseki	Kamakura	Kamakura period earthworks beside the road, half a kilometre from Gokuraku-ji		35°18′53″N 139°31′39″E	2, 6	00003514
Inamuragasaki 稲村ヶ崎 (新田義貞徒渉伝説地) Inamuragasaki	Kamakura	Kamakura period site where Nitta Yoshisada entered Kamakura during the Siege of Kamakura (1333)	Inamuragasaki	35°18′07″N 139°31′32″E	8	790
Egara Tenjin Shrine Precinct 荏柄天神社境内 Egara Tenjin-sha keidai	Kamakura	Shinto shrine submitted for inscription on the UNESCO World Heritage List as one of the Temples, Shrines and other structures of Ancient Kamakura; the ICP honden dates to 1316	Egara Tenjin Shrine Precinct	35°19′33″N 139°33′52″E	3	00003454
Yōfuku-ji ruins 永福寺跡 Yōfukuji ato	Kamakura	Buddhist temple ruins submitted for inscription on the UNESCO World Heritage List as one of the Temples, Shrines and other structures of Ancient Kamakura	Yōfukuji ruins	35°19′38″N 139°34′08″E	3	804
Engaku-ji Precinct 円覚寺境内 Engakuji keidai	Kamakura	Buddhist temple submitted for inscription on the UNESCO World Heritage List as one of the Temples, Shrines and other structures of Ancient Kamakura	Engakuji Precinct	35°20′16″N 139°32′52″E	3	808
Engaku-ji Gardens 円覚寺庭園 Engakuji teien	Kamakura	Buddhist temple garden; also a Place of Scenic Beauty; submitted for inscription on the UNESCO World Heritage List as one of the Temples, Shrines and other structures of Ancient Kamakura	Engakuji Gardens	35°20′12″N 139°32′43″E	8	788
Shimoterao Kanga site 下寺尾官衙遺跡群 Shimoterao kanga iseki-gun	Chigasaki	Nara / Heian period local administration complex ruins		35°21′46″N 139°23′48″E	2	00003890
Kewaizaka Pass 仮粧坂 Kehaizaka	Kamakura	Kamakura period sites submitted for inscription on the UNESCO World Heritage List as one of the Temples, Shrines and other structures of Ancient Kamakura	Kewaizaka Pass	35°19′37″N 139°32′44″E	6	814
Natsushima Shell Mound 夏島貝塚 Natsushima kaizuka	Yokosuka	Jomon period shell midden		35°19′21″N 139°38′58″E	1	817
Kakuon-ji Precinct 覚園寺境内 Kakuonji keidai	Kamakura	Buddhist temple submitted for inscription on the UNESCO World Heritage List as one of the Temples, Shrines and other structures of Ancient Kamakura	Kakuonji Precinct	35°19′59″N 139°33′49″E	3	809
Kamakura Daibutsuden 鎌倉大仏殿跡 Kamakura daibutsuden ato	Kamakura	Buddhist temple submitted for inscription on the UNESCO World Heritage List as one of the Temples, Shrines and other structures of Ancient Kamakura	Kamakura Daibutsuden ruins	35°19′00″N 139°32′09″E	3	3385
Kamegayatsuzaka Pass 亀ヶ谷坂 Kamegayatsuzaka	Kamakura	Kamakura period site submitted for inscription on the UNESCO World Heritage List as one of the Temples, Shrines and other structures of Ancient Kamakura	Kamegayatsuzaka Pass	35°19′51″N 139°33′01″E	6	812
Tachibana Kanga site 橘樹官衙遺跡群 Tachibana kanga iseki-gun	Kawasaki	Nara / Heian period local administration complex ruins	Tachibana Kanga ruins	35°34′42″N 139°37′09″E	2	00003889
Former Yokohama Specie Bank Head Office 旧横浜正金銀行本店 kyū-Yokohama Shōkin Ginkō honten kaizuka	Yokohama	established in 1880, the ICP honkan (main building) dates to 1904 and is used for the Kanagawa Prefectural Museum of Cultural History	Former Yokohama Specie Bank Head Office	35°26′57″N 139°38′11″E	6	824
Sagami River Bridge ruins 旧相模川橋脚 kyū-Sagami-gawa kyōkyaku	Chigasaki	also a Natural Monument	Sagami River Bridge ruins	35°19′55″N 139°23′04″E	6	777
Kobukurozaka Pass 巨福呂坂 Kobukurozaka	Kamakura	Kamakura period	Kobukurozaka Pass	35°19′39″N 139°33′16″E	6	813
Gokuraku-ji Precinct - Tomb of Ninshō 極楽寺境内・忍性墓 Gokurakuji keidai・Ninshō no haka	Kamakura	Buddhist temple submitted for inscription on the UNESCO World Heritage List as one of the Temples, Shrines and other structures of Ancient Kamakura	Gokurakuji Precinct - Tomb of Ninshō	35°18′36″N 139°31′44″E	7	781
Kenchō-ji Precinct 建長寺境内 Kenchōji keidai	Kamakura	Buddhist temple submitted for inscription on the UNESCO World Heritage List as one of the Temples, Shrines and other structures of Ancient Kamakura	Kenchōji Precinct	35°19′54″N 139°33′17″E	3	805
Kenchō-ji Gardens 建長寺庭園 Kenchōji teien	Kamakura	Buddhist temple gardens; also a Place of Scenic Beauty; submitted for inscription on the UNESCO World Heritage List as one of the Temples, Shrines and other structures of Ancient Kamakura	Kenchōji Gardens	35°19′56″N 139°33′20″E	8	787
Moto-Hakone Stone Buddhas 元箱根石仏群 Moto-Hakone sekibutsu	Hakone	Kamakura period monuments; designation includes three gorintō, one dating to 1295, and a hōkyōintō of 1296; the ICP sculptures date from the late C13/early C14	Moto-Hakone Stone Buddhas	35°13′02″N 139°02′19″E	3	797
Goryōgaidai Shell Mound 五領ヶ台貝塚 Goryōgaidai kaizuka	Hiratsuka	Jomon period shell midden	Goryōgaidai Shell Mound	35°21′16″N 139°18′02″E	1	818
Grave of William Adams 三浦安針墓 Miura Anjin no haka	Yokosuka	Edo Period personage	Grave of William Adams	35°16′45″N 139°38′27″E	7	774
Santonodai Site 三殿台遺跡 Santonodai iseki	Yokohama	Yayoi period settlement trace	Santonodai Site	35°25′14″N 139°36′39″E	1	802
Wakamiya Ōji 若宮大路 Wakamiya Ōji	Kamakura	Kamakura period site submitted for inscription on the UNESCO World Heritage List as one of the Temples, Shrines and other structures of Ancient Kamakura	Wakamiya Ōji	35°18′58″N 139°33′01″E	3, 6	793
Jufuku-ji Precinct 寿福寺境内 Jufukuji keidai	Kamakura	Buddhist temple submitted for inscription on the UNESCO World Heritage List as one of the Temples, Shrines and other structures of Ancient Kamakura	Jufukuji Precinct	35°19′27″N 139°32′57″E	3	801
Akibayama Kofun Cluster 秋葉山古墳群 Akibayama kofun-gun	Ebina	Konfun period tumuli	Akibayama Kofun Cluster	35°28′12″N 139°24′15″E	1	00003453
Katsusaka Site 勝坂遺跡 Katsusaka iseki	Sagamihara	Jomon period settlement trace	Katsusaka Site	35°30′32″N 139°23′18″E	1	819
Odawara Castle ruins 小田原城跡 Odawara-jō ato	Odawara	Sengoku / Edo period castle	Odawara Castle ruins	35°15′03″N 139°09′13″E	2	794
Shōmyō-ji Precinct 称名寺境内 Shōmyōji keidai	Yokohama	Buddhist temple submitted for inscription on the UNESCO World Heritage List as one of the Temples, Shrines and other structures of Ancient Kamakura	Shōmyōji Precinct	35°20′38″N 139°37′49″E	3	773
Jōkōmyō-ji Precinct - Grave of Reizei Tamesuke 浄光明寺境内・冷泉為相墓 Jōkōmyōji keidai・Reizei Tamesuke haka	Kamakura	Buddhist temple submitted for inscription on the UNESCO World Heritage List as one of the Temples, Shrines and other structures of Ancient Kamakura	Jōkōmyōji Precinct	35°19′37″N 139°33′05″E	3, 7	780
Jōchi-ji Precinct 浄智寺境内 Jōchiji keidai	Kamakura	Buddhist temple founded in Kamakura period	Jōchiji Precinct	35°20′00″N 139°32′48″E	3	800
Jōmyō-ji Precinct 浄妙寺境内 Jōmyōji keidai	Kamakura	Buddhist temple founded in Kamakura period	Jōmyōji Precinct	35°19′21″N 139°34′16″E	3	806
Kanzaki Site 神崎遺跡 Kanzaki iseki	Ayase	Yayoi period settlement trace	Kanzaki Site	35°24′37″N 139°24′26″E	1	00003699
Zuisen-ji Precinct 瑞泉寺境内 Zuisenji keidai	Kamakura	Buddhist temple, submitted for inscription on the UNESCO World Heritage List as one of the Temples, Shrines and other structures of Ancient Kamakura	Zuisenji Precinct	35°19′21″N 139°34′16″E	3	815
Suarashi Stone Age Site 寸沢嵐石器時代遺跡 Suarashi isekki-jidai iseki	Sagamihara	Jomon period settlement trace	Suarashi Stone Age Site	35°36′00″N 139°13′24″E	1	785
Mount Ishigaki 石垣山 Ishigaki-yama	Odawara	site of Sengoku period Ishigakiyama Ichiya Castle	Mount Ishigaki	35°14′08″N 139°07′39″E	2	799
Kawajiri Stone Age Site 川尻石器時代遺跡 Kawajiri shisekki-jidai iseki	Sagamihara	Jomon period settlement trace		35°35′30″N 139°18′01″E	1	786
Sagami Kokubun-ji ruins 相模国分寺跡 Sagami Kokubunji ato	Ebina	Nara period provincial temple of Sagami Province	Sagami Kokubunji ruins	35°27′16″N 139°23′52″E	3	771
Sagami Kokubun-niji ruins 相模国分尼寺跡 Sagami Kokubunniji ato	Ebina	Nara period provincial nunnery of Sagami Province	Sagami Kokubunniji ruins	35°27′38″N 139°23′53″E	3	825
Ōmachi Shakadō Pass Site 大町釈迦堂口遺跡 Ōmachi Shakado-guchi iseki	Kamakura	Kamakura period	Ōmachi Shakadō Pass Site	35°19′02″N 139°33′54″E	3	00003681
Ōtsuka-Saikachido Site 大塚・歳勝土遺跡 Ōtsuka-Saikachido iseki	Yokohama	Yayoi period settlement trace	Ōtsuka-Saikachido Site	35°33′02″N 139°34′50″E	1	823
Daibutsu Pass 大仏切通 Daibutsu kiridōshi	Kamakura	Kamakura period site submitted for inscription on the UNESCO World Heritage List as one of the Temples, Shrines and other structures of Ancient Kamakura	Daibutsu Pass	35°19′38″N 139°31′59″E	6	820
Asaina Pass 朝夷奈切通 Asaina kiridōshi	Kamakura	Kamakura period site submitted for inscription on the UNESCO World Heritage List as one of the Temples, Shrines and other structures of Ancient Kamakura	Asaina Pass	35°19′51″N 139°35′28″E	6	811
Nagae-Sakurayama Kofun Cluster 長柄桜山古墳群 Nagae-Sakurayama kofun-gun	Zushi, Hayama	Kofun period tumuli cluster	Nagae-Sakurayama Kofun Cluster	35°17′14″N 139°35′05″E	1	3351
Tsurugaoka Hachiman-gū Precinct 鶴岡八幡宮境内 Tsurugaoka Hachimangū keidai	Kamakura	Shinto shrine submitted for inscription on the UNESCO World Heritage List as one of the Temples, Shrines and other structures of Ancient Kamakura	Tsurugaoka Hachimangū Precinct	35°19′31″N 139°33′21″E	3	807
Grave of Uesugi Norikata 伝上杉憲方墓 den-Uesugi Norikata no haka	Kamakura	Kamakura period tomb		35°18′34″N 139°31′47″E	7	782
Tanamukaihara Site 田名向原遺跡 Tanamukaihara iseki	Sagamihara	Japanese Paleolithic Site		35°31′46″N 139°21′18″E	1	3244
Tōshō-ji Site 東勝寺跡 Tōshōji ato	Kamakura	Buddhist temple ruins submitted for inscription on the UNESCO World Heritage List as one of the Temples, Shrines and other structures of Ancient Kamakura	Tōshōji Site	35°19′14″N 139°33′35″E	2, 3	3213
Fujisawa Memorial Tower to Friends and Foe 藤沢敵御方供養塔 Fujisawa tekimikata kuyōtō	Fujisawa	Sengoku period monument erected to commemorate those who fell in the Uesugi Zenshū Rebellion (上杉禅秀の乱) of Ōei 23 (1416); on the grounds of Shōjōkō-ji (清浄光寺)	Fujisawa Memorial Tower to Friends and Foe	35°20′51″N 139°29′19″E	3	776
Grave of Hino Toshimoto 日野俊基墓 Hino Toshimoto no haka	Kamakura	Kamakura period	Grave of Hino Toshimoto	35°19′41″N 139°32′35″E	7	779
Hakone Barrier Site 箱根関跡 Hakone no seki ato	Hakone	Edo Period	Hakone Barrier Site	35°11′33″N 139°01′34″E	6	772
Buppō-ji Site 仏法寺跡 Buppōji ato	Kamakura	Buddhist temple submitted for inscription on the UNESCO World Heritage List as one of the Temples, Shrines and other structures of Ancient Kamakura		35°18′26″N 139°31′52″E	3	00003501
Hokkedō Site 法華堂跡 (源頼朝墓・北条義時墓) Hokkedō ato (Minamoto Yoritomo no haka・Hōjō Yoshitoki no haka)	Kamakura	designation includes the tomb of Minamoto no Yoritomo and the tomb of Hōjō Yoshitoki	Hokkedō Site	35°19′33″N 139°33′40″E	3, 7	778
Hōjō Clan Tokiwa Residence Site 北条氏常盤亭跡 Hōjō-shi Tokiwa-tei ato	Kamakura	submitted for inscription on the UNESCO World Heritage List as one of the Temples, Shrines and other structures of Ancient Kamakura		35°19′24″N 139°31′55″E	2	821
Nagoe Pass 名越切通 Nagoe kiridōshi	Kamakura	Kamakura period site submitted for inscription on the UNESCO World Heritage List as one of the Temples, Shrines and other structures of Ancient Kamakura	Nagoe Pass	35°18′27″N 139°33′53″E	6	803
Meigetsu-in Precinct 明月院境内 Meigetsuin keidai	Kamakura	Buddhist temple	Meigetsuin Precinct	35°20′06″N 139°33′05″E	3	822
Wakae Island 和賀江嶋 Wakaejima	Kamakura, Zushi	Kamakura period site submitted for inscription on the UNESCO World Heritage List as one of the Temples, Shrines and other structures of Ancient Kamakura	Wakae Island	35°18′01″N 139°33′05″E	3, 5, 6	810
Akasaka Site 赤坂遺跡 Akasaka iseki	Miura	Yayoi period settlement trace	Akasaka Site	35°10′28″N 139°38′03″E	1	00003779
Old Hakone Road 箱根旧街道 Hakone kyū-kaidō	Hakone	stretch of the old Tōkaidō; the designation includes areas of Mishima and Kannami in Shizuoka Prefecture	Old Hakone Road	35°11′36″N 139°01′35″E	6	798
Tokyo Bay Fortress Sites 東京湾要塞跡 Tōkyō-wan yōsai ato	Yokosuka	designation includes the sites of Sarushima Battery (猿島砲台跡) and Chiyogasaki Battery (千代ヶ崎砲台跡)		35°17′10″N 139°41′38″E	2	00003891
Stone Quarries for Edo Castle Site 江戸城石垣石丁場跡 Edo-jō ishigaki ishi-chōba ato	Odawara	designation includes areas of Atami and Itō in Shizuoka Prefecture		35°14′08″N 139°07′40″E	6	00003930
Shimoterao Nishikata Site 下寺尾西方遺跡 Shimoterao Nishikata iseki	Chigasaki	Yayoi period settlement trace		35°21′49″N 139°24′01″E	1	00003890

== Prefectural Historic Sites ==
As of 1 August 2019, twenty-five Sites have been designated as being of prefectural importance.

Site	Municipality	Comments	Image	Coordinates	Type	Ref.
Hayakawa Castle ruins 早川城跡; Hayakawa-jō ato	Ayase			35°26′14″N 139°25′10″E		'for all refs see
Ichigao Yokoana Kofun Cluster 市ヶ尾横穴古墳群; Ichigao yokoana kofun-gun	Yokohama			35°33′27″N 139°32′24″E		
Shinano Ichirizuka 品濃一里塚; Shinano ichirizuka	Yokohama	on the old Tōkaidō		35°25′57″N 139°33′52″E		
Inarimae Kofun Cluster 稲荷前古墳群; Inarimae kofun-gun	Yokohama			35°33′35″N 139°31′55″E		
Shibokuchi Shell Mound 子母口貝塚; Shibokuchi kaizuka	Kawasaki			35°34′28″N 139°37′31″E		
Higashitakane Site 東高根遺跡; Higashitakane iseki	Kawasaki	Yayoi- to Kofun-period settlement, now protected within Higashitakane Forest Park (東高根森林公園)		35°36′16″N 139°35′11″E		
Maginu Kofun 馬絹古墳; Maginu kofun	Kawasaki			35°35′01″N 139°36′05″E		
Saifukuji Kofun 西福寺古墳; Saifukuji kofun	Kawasaki			35°34′59″N 139°36′29″E		
Kayama Shell Mound 茅山貝塚; Kayama kaizuka	Yokosuka			35°14′02″N 139°41′38″E		
Yoshii Shell Mound and associated site 吉井貝塚を中心とした遺跡; Yoshii kaizuka wo chūshin to shita iseki	Yokosuka	late-Heian yamashiro and a Jōmon midden		35°14′18″N 139°42′07″E		
Dankazura 段葛; Dankazura	Kamakura	pathway along Wakamiya Ōji leading to Tsurugaoka Hachiman-gū		35°19′11″N 139°33′09″E		
Hyakuhachi Yagura 百八やぐら; Hyakuhachi Yagura	Kamakura	yagura near Kakuon-ji (覚園寺)		35°19′51″N 139°33′52″E		
Yoichi-zuka and Bunzōdō on the Ishibashiyama Battlefield 石橋山古戦場のうち与一塚及び文三堂; Ishibashiyama ko-senjō no uchi Yoichi-zuka oyobi bunzōdō	Odawara	Yoichi-zuka is the burial mound of Sanada Yoshitada (佐奈田義忠)		35°13′16″N 139°08′25″E		
Tsutsumi Shell Mound 堤貝塚; Tsutsumi kaizuka	Chigasaki			35°21′46″N 139°25′26″E		
Bishamon Caves Yayoi Dwelling Sites 毘沙門洞窟弥生時代住居阯群; Bishamon dōkutsu Yayoi-jidai jūkyoshi-gun	Miura			35°08′23″N 139°39′18″E		
Futagozuka Kofun 二子塚古墳; Futagozuka kofun	Hadano			35°21′34″N 139°16′00″E		
Mediaeval Architecture of Kami-Hamada 上浜田中世建築遺構群; Kami-Hamada chūsei kenchiku ikō-gun	Ebina			35°26′40″N 139°24′08″E		
Kamaguchi Kofun 釜口古墳; Kamaguchi kofun	Ōiso			35°19′03″N 139°19′07″E		
Tarekoyatonishi Cave Tomb Cluster たれこ谷戸西横穴群; Tarekoyatonishi yokoana-gun	Ōiso			35°19′02″N 139°16′14″E		
Shōgakubo Cave Tomb Cluster 庄ケ久保横穴群; Shōgakubo yokoana-gun	Ōiso			35°18′49″N 139°17′22″E		
Yōkokujiyato Cave Tomb Cluster 楊谷寺谷戸横穴群; Yōkokujiyato yokoana-gun	Ōiso			35°19′15″N 139°18′49″E		
Kawamura Castle ruins 河村城跡; Kawamura-jō ato	Yamakita			35°21′20″N 139°04′38″E		
Dohi Sugiyama Cave 土肥椙山厳窟(伝源頼朝隠潜地); Tohi Sugiyama gankutsu (den-Minamoto no Yoritomo insenchi)	Yugawara	said to have been the hiding place of Minamoto no Yoritomo after the Battle of Ishibashiyama		35°09′53″N 139°04′31″E		
Dohi Clan Graves 土肥一族の墓所; Tohi ichizoku no bosho	Yugawara			35°08′52″N 139°06′08″E		
Enoshima 江ノ島; Enoshima	Fujisawa	also a Prefectural Place of Scenic Beauty		35°17′59″N 139°28′49″E		

== Municipal Historic Sites ==
As of 1 May 2019, a further one hundred and thirty-one Sites have been designated as being of municipal importance.

== Registered Historic Sites ==
As of 1 August 2019, one Monument has been registered (as opposed to designated) as an Historic Site at a national level.

Place	Municipality	Comments	Image	Coordinates	Type	Ref.
Soya Waterworks 曽屋水道; Soya suidō	Hadano			35°22′45″N 139°13′15″E		

== See also ==
- Cultural Properties of Japan
- Sagami Province
- Musashi Province
- Kamakura Museum of National Treasures
- List of Places of Scenic Beauty of Japan (Kanagawa)
- List of Cultural Properties of Japan - paintings (Kanagawa)
- List of Cultural Properties of Japan - historical materials (Kanagawa)
