= Santonodai Site =

Santonodai site
- 三殿台遺跡 (Japanese)
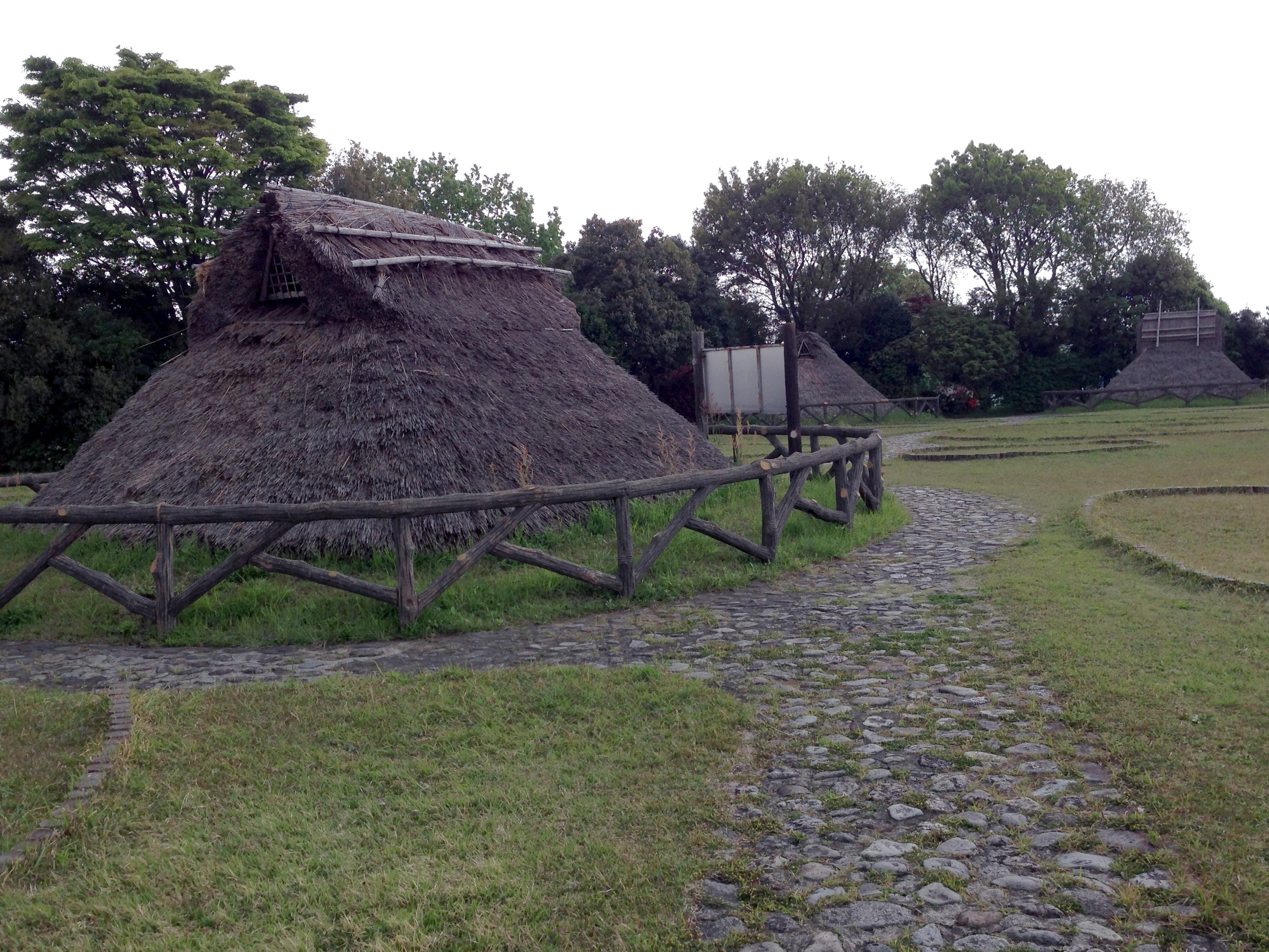
- reconstructed building at Santonodai site

- Santonodai site Santonodai Site (Japan)
- 35°25′14″N 139°36′39″E
- Periods: Yayoi period
- Location: Isogo-ku, Yokohama, Japan
- Region: Kantō region

Site notes
- Public access: Yes (Park, Museum)

The Santonodai site (三殿台遺跡, Santonodai iseki) is an archaeological park with the ruins of a large-scale Yayoi period settlement, located in the Okamura neighborhood of Isogo-ku, Yokohama, Kanagawa Prefecture in the southern Kantō region of Japan. It was designated a National Historic Site of Japan in 1966.

== Overview ==
The Santonodai site is located in a residential area of Yokohama, on the edge of a plateau with an elevation of 55 meters. The site covers an area of about 10,000 square meters. Several small shell mounds from the middle and late Jōmon period and Yayoi period were long known to have existed on this site, which was formerly known as the "Byōbugauramura shell mound", and which was introduced to academia in 1899 after a local doctor and antiquarian conducted several small excavations in 1899. From 1959 to 1961, excavations were conducted throughout the area due to the planned expansion of a neighboring elementary school, and more than 252 pit dwellings and other remains were discovered. Of these, eight were from the Jōmon period, about 200 were from the Yayoi period, and 43 were from the Kofun period. This included a huge oval-shaped pit dwelling with a major axis of more than 14 meters. Currently, the site is backfilled, with pillars indicating foundation holes and a number of restored dwellings from each era, forming an archaeological park. Various excavated relics are stored and exhibited at the Santonodai Archaeological Museum (横浜市三殿台考古館) on site.

The site is about a 20-minute walk from Maita Station on the Yokohama Municipal Subway.

== See also ==
- List of Historic Sites of Japan (Kanagawa)
