= Natsushima Shell Mound =

Archeological site Yokosuka, Japan

- 夏島貝塚 (Japanese)
- Natsushima Shell Mound Natsushima Shell Mound (Japan)
- 35°19′21″N 139°38′58″E
- Type: shell midden
- Periods: Jōmon period
- Location: Yokosuka, Kanagawa, Japan
- Region: Kantō region

Site notes
- Public access: Yes (park)

The Natsushima Shell Midden (夏島貝塚, Natsushima kaizuka) is an archaeological site in the Natsushima neighborhood of the city of Yokosuka, Kanagawa Prefecture, in the southern Kantō region of Japan containing a Jōmon period shell midden. It was designated a National Historic Site of Japan in 1972. It was then oldest known shell midden in Japan.

== Overview ==
During the early to middle Jōmon period (approximately 4000 to 2500 BC), sea levels were five to six meters higher than at present, and the ambient temperature was also 2 deg C higher. During this period, the Kantō region was inhabited by the Jōmon people, many of whom lived in coastal settlements. The middens associated with such settlements contain bone, botanical material, mollusc shells, sherds, lithics, and other artifacts and ecofacts associated with the now-vanished inhabitants, and these features, provide a useful source into the diets and habits of Jōmon society. Most of these middens are found along the Pacific coast of Japan.

The Natsushima site is located on what was once an island in Tokyo Bay, but which is now surrounded by reclaimed land. The midden is located at the eastern end of the former island, at an elevation of 50 meters above the present sea level. It measures approximately 14 meters from east-to-west by 13 meters from north-to-south. During archaeological excavations by Meiji University in 1950 and 1955 it was found to be clearly stratified into three layers, with a deposit of soil in between each layer. Each of the strata had shards of Jōmon pottery, which greatly assisted in dating the mound, and radiocarbon dating of the lowest layer yielded a date of 9500 years ago, which created considerable academic interest. Other artifacts in the midden included stone weapons and stone tools, bone weapons and tools, fishing hooks made from shell, and shell ring jewelry. These artifacts are stored and exhibited at the Meiji University Museum. The site is a 10-minute walk from the "Matsushima" bus stop on the Keikyu bus from Oppama Station on the Keikyū Main Line.

== See also ==
- List of Historic Sites of Japan (Kanagawa)
