= Sagami River Bridge ruins =

Kamakura period bridge in Japan

Former Sagami River Bridge
- 旧相模川橋脚 (Japanese)

- Former Sagami River Bridge Sagami River Bridge ruins (Japan)
- 35°19′55″N 139°23′04″E
- Periods: Kamakura period
- Location: Chigasaki, Kanagawa, Japan
- Region: Kantō region

Site notes
- Discovered: 1923
- Public access: Yes (no public facilities)

The Former Sagami River Bridge (旧相模川橋脚, kyū-Sagami-gawa kyōkyaku) is the ruins of a Kamakura period bridge over the former course of the Sagami River, located in what is now the city of Chigasaki, Kanagawa Prefecture in the southern Kantō region of Japan. The site was designated a National Historic Site of Japan in 1926, with the area under protection expanded in 2007. It was further designated as a Natural Monument in 2013.

== Overview ==
After the 1923 Great Kantō earthquake and its two major aftershocks in January 1924, seven wooden pillars suddenly appeared in the paddy fields along the Koide River. Subsequent investigations found three more pillars still buried in the ground. These pillars are made of hinoki wood, with a diameter of 60 centimeters, and have a surviving length of 3.6 meters. From the location, it was postulated that these are the remnants of a bridge across the Sagami River as was mentioned in the medieval chronicle Azuma Kagami. Per the Azuma Kagami, the bridge was constructed by Inage Shigetada, a relative of Hatakeyama Shigetada, who had an estate in this area. Inage Shigetada was married to a younger sister of Hōjō Masako, and was thus Minamoto no Yoritomo's brother-in-law. Yoritomo is recorded as having attended the funeral of the wife of Inage Shigetada in 1198, crossing over this bridge. According to legend, during the return, Yoritomo's horse was spooked by the ghosts of the Taira clan and his brother Minamoto no Yoshitsune as it crossed the bridge and threw Yoritomo into the river. He fell ill and died shortly afterwards, and the ten bodyguards who accompanied him all committed seppuku, with their graves at the nearby temple of Ryuzen-in.

Dendrochronology has dated the pillars to between 1126 and 1260 AD, which corresponds to the dating given in the Azuma Kagami. The original arrangement appears to have been in rows of three pillars each separated by two meters, with at least four rows, separated by ten meter intervals. The width of the bridge is estimated to have been seven meters, with an overall length of perhaps 40 meters, making it one of the largest bridges in Japan at the time.

The location of the site is about 2.5 kilometers east of the current Sagami River channel, and it is known from historical sources that the Sagami River channel has changed position several times due to earthquakes. The bridge fell out of use after the Kamakura period and during the Edo Period crossing of the Sagami River was made by a boat ferry.

The pillars were preserved in a pond since their discovery, but suffered from exposure to the elements over the decades since their discovery, and were replaced with concrete replicas, with the actual wood reburied underneath. In 2013, they were designated as a Natural Monument, even though they are an artificial construction, with the rationale that they appeared due to soil liquefaction after the Great Kantō earthquake.

== See also ==
- List of Historic Sites of Japan (Kanagawa)
