= Tachibana Kanga site =

Archaeological site in Japan

Tachibana Kanga ruins
- 橘樹官衙遺跡群 (Japanese)
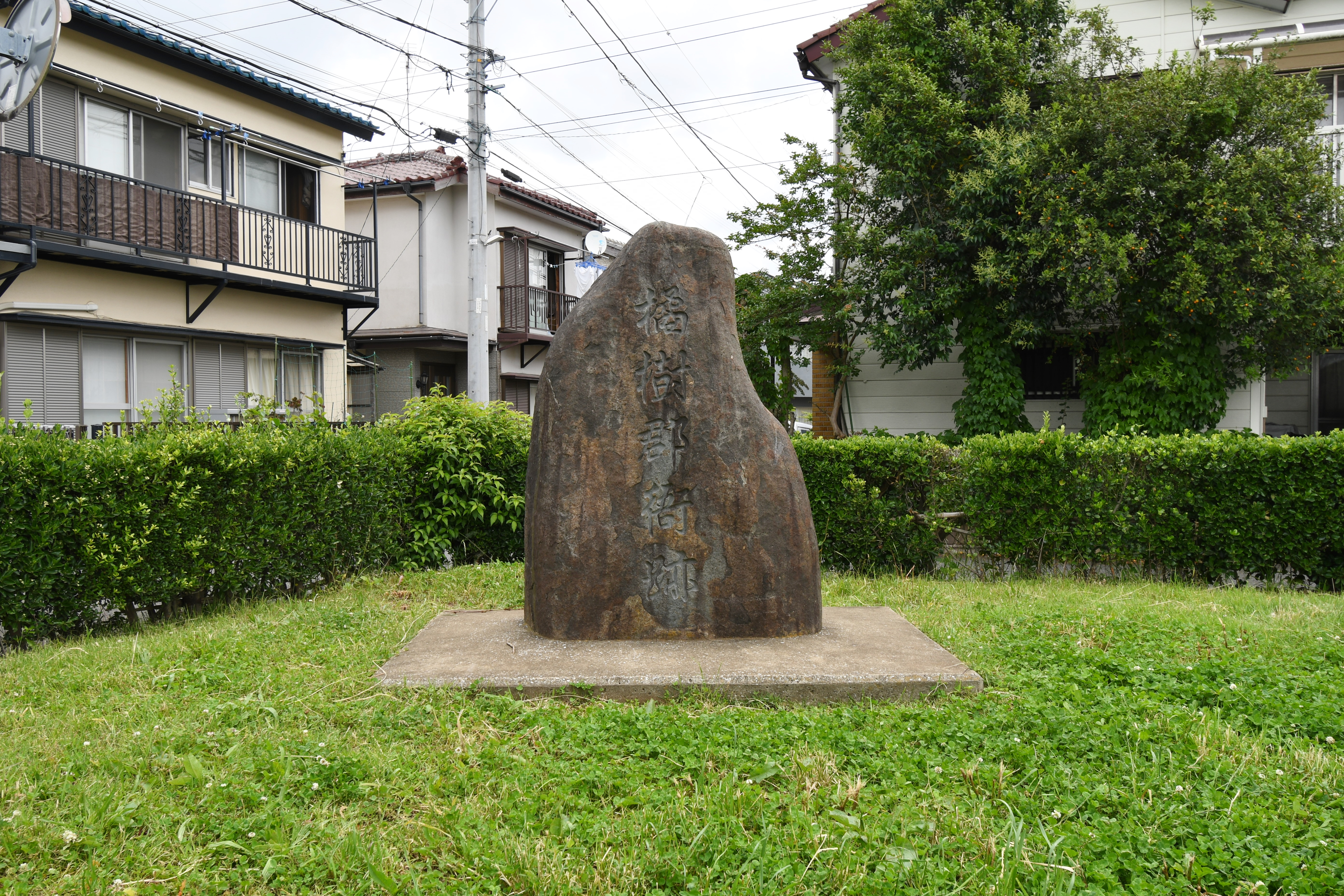
- Tachibana Kanga ruins

- Tachibana Kanga ruins Tachibana Kanga site (Japan)
- 35°34′42″N 139°37′09″E
- Periods: Nara - Heian period
- Location: Takatsu-ku, Kawasaki, Kanagawa Prefecture, Japan
- Region: Kantō region

History
- Built: 7th century AD
- Abandoned: 10th century AD

Site notes
- Public access: Yes (no public facilities)

The Tachibana Kanga ruins (橘樹官衙遺跡群, Tachibana kanga iseki gun) is an archaeological site with the ruins of a Nara to Heian period government administrative complex located in what is now the Takatsu Ward of the city of Kawasaki, Kanagawa prefecture in the Kantō region of Japan. The ruins were protected as a National Historic Site in 2015.

== Overview ==
In the late Nara period, after the establishment of a centralized government under the Ritsuryō system, local rule over the provinces was standardized under a kokufu (provincial capital), and each province was divided into smaller administrative districts, known as (郡, gun, kōri), composed of 2–20 townships in 715 AD. Each of the units had an administrative complex built on a semi-standardized layout based on contemporary Chinese design, and was often accompanied by a district temple, which was a smaller version of the provincial kokubun-ji temples.

The Tachibana Kanga site was formerly known as the Chitose-Iseyamadai ruins (千年伊勢山台遺跡) and is located at the top of the southeastern tip of the Tama Hills, about 40 meters above sea level, on the south bank of the middle reaches of the Tama River. The surrounding area has a high concentration of late and final Kofun period burial mounds. The site was discovered in 1996 during a survey prior to a residential housing project, in which the foundations of multiple raised-floor buildings thought to be the remains of an ancient granary complex were detected. Since then, the site has undergone continuous archaeological excavations by the Kawasaki City Board of Education. It is believed to be the location of the county-level administrative complex for ancient Tachibana County in southern Musashi Province, which is mentioned in the 8th century Nihon Shoki chronicle.

The remains can roughly be divided into four phases of construction:

Phase I consisted of two large-walled buildings aligned about 40 degrees west from true north, dating from the latter half of the 7th century. An entry in the Shoku Nihongi dated 768 AD, records that men of Tachibana County presented a rare white pheasant to the Emperor and noted that the area had been settled by the Kishi clan, a migrant clan from the mainland. Phase II consisted of four 3x4 bay buildings, aligned 30 degrees west from true north, and six smaller raised floor warehouses placed at regular intervals a short distance away. These structures date from the latter half of the 7th century to the first half of the 8th century.

In Phase III, the main axis of the building was realigned to due north, and complex was surrounded by a moat, forming an enclosure 150 meters north-to-south by 200 meters east-to-west. Within, a total of 13 buildings and five warehouses were recognized, organized around a large open courtyard, with a separate granary completed to the west, This phase is believed to have survived from the first half of the 8th century to the end of the 8th century. Although the buildings were rebuilt in the Phase IV period, all of the rebuilt buildings were on a smaller scale, indicating that the complex was declining, and it appears to have been abandoned in the middle of the 9th century.

Approximately 400 meters to the west of this complex is the ruins of the Buddhist temple, which was part of the standard Kanga template. It is located underneath a later temple called Yōgō-ji (影向寺). The site was excavated by Nihon University from 1977 to 1981 and was confirmed to date from the latter half of the 7th century to the first half of the 8th century, or from Phase I of the Kanga construction. Roof tiles excavated at the site were made at the same kilns as the Musashi Provincial Capital. The Kondō was rebuilt in the middle of the 8th century, and that it was repaired until the beginning of the 10th century. The ruins of the Kondō were found under the base of the current Yakushi-dō, which was built during the Genroku era of the Edo period, which is the main hall of the present-day Yōgō-ji temple.

In addition, within the precincts, the foundation of a large building from the latter half of the 7th century, aligned on same main axis as Phase I Kanga buildings, was detected in the lowest layer of the temple site, and may be the foundations of the official residence of the local governor.

== See also ==
- List of Historic Sites of Japan (Kanagawa)
