= Suarashi Stone Age Site =

Archaeological site in Japan

- 寸沢嵐石器時代遺跡 (Japanese)
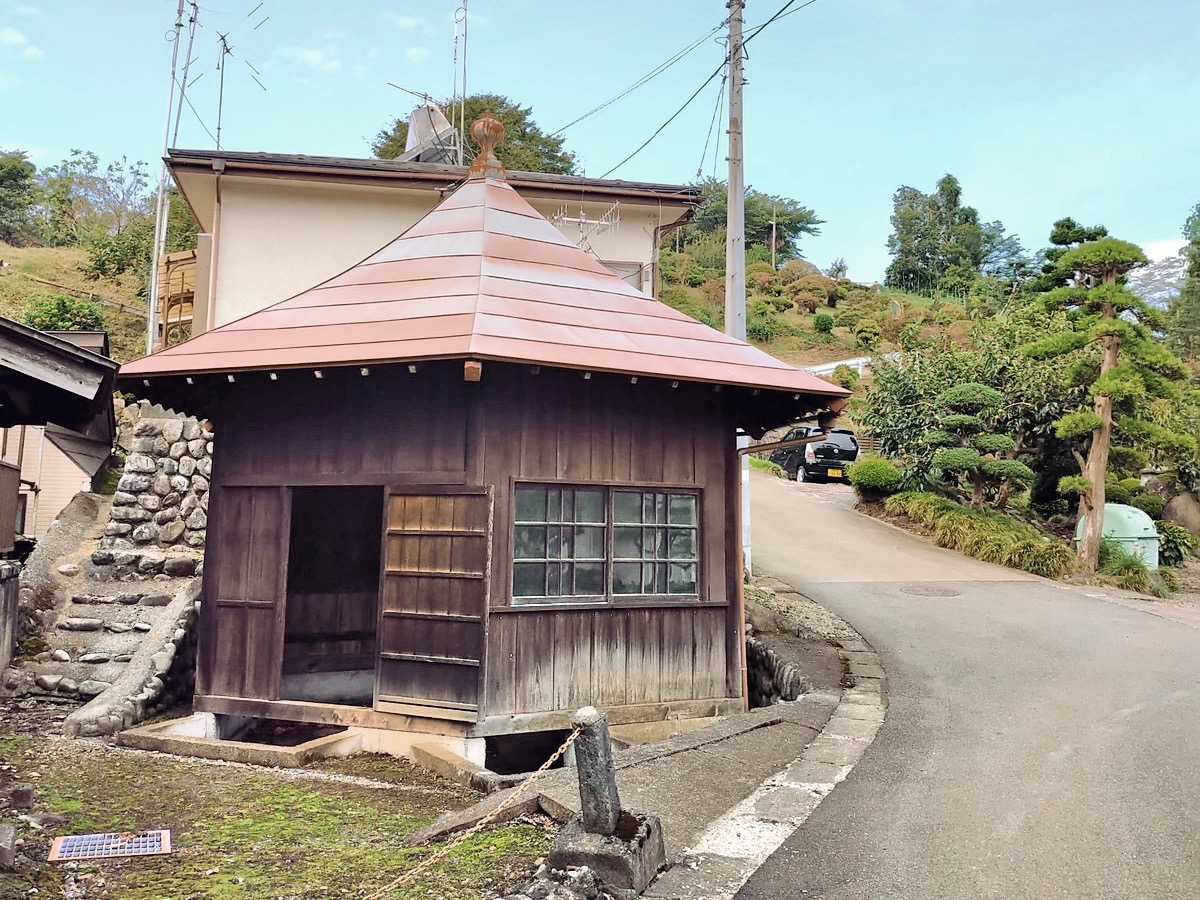
- Suarashi Stone Age Site

- Suarashi Stone Age Site Suarashi Stone Age Site (Japan)
- 35°36′00″N 139°13′24″E
- Type: settlement trace
- Periods: Jōmon period
- Location: Sagamihara, Kanagawa, Japan
- Region: Kantō region

Site notes
- Public access: Yes

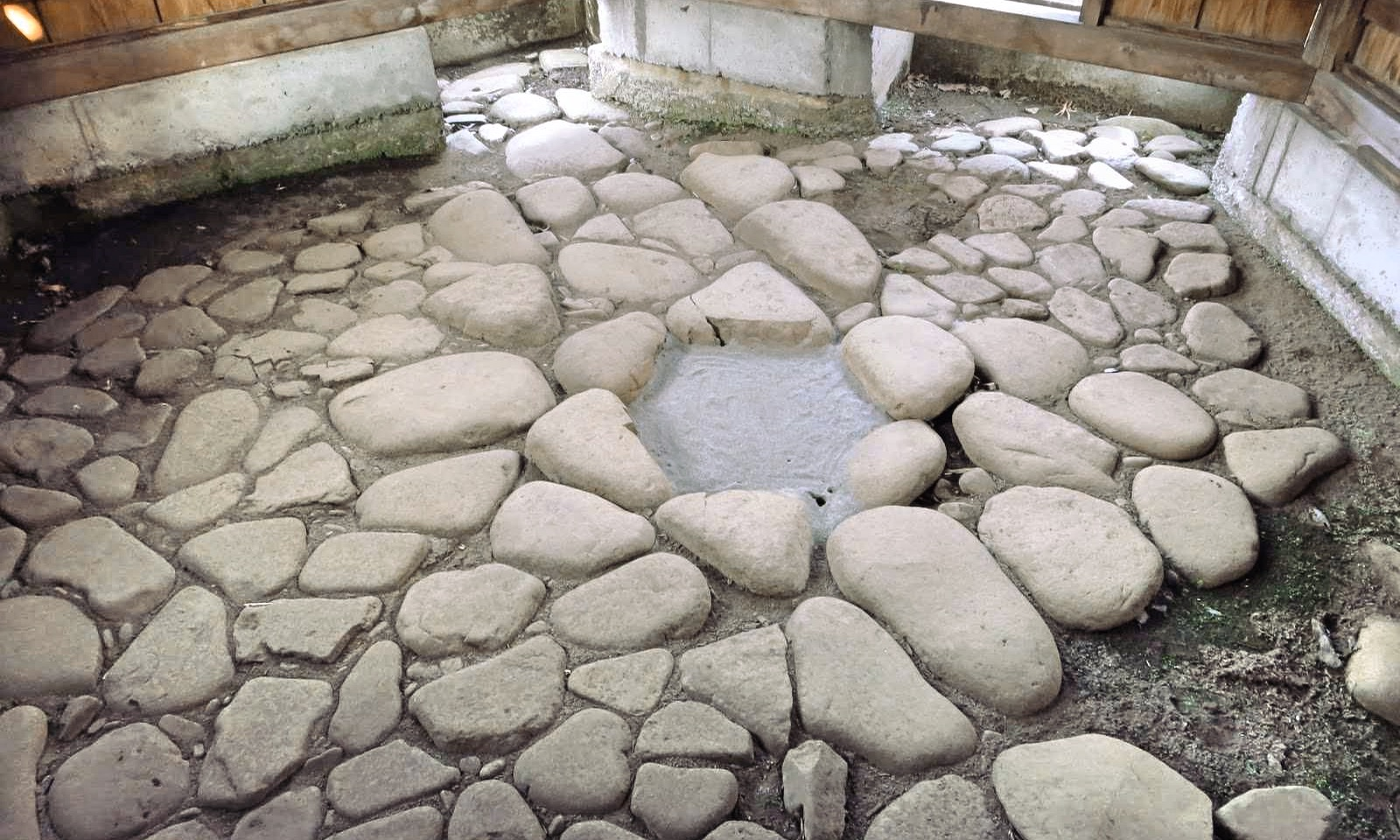
Suarashi Stone Age Site interior

The Suarashi Stone Age Site (寸沢嵐石器時代遺跡, すあらしせっきじだいいせき, Suarashi-sekki-jidai iseki) is an archaeological site in the Suwarashi neighborhood of Midori-ku, Sagamihara, Kanagawa Prefecture, in the southern Kantō region of Japan containing the remains of a late Jōmon period settlement. It was designated a National Historic Site in 1930.

== Overview ==
Suarashi Stone Age Site is located on a fluvial terrace facing the confluence of the Sagami River and the Doshi River, which is now dammed by Lake Sagami. An archaeological excavation was conducted in 1928 after stones were found by a farmer plowing his fields, and the remains of a flagstone-floored Jōmon period pit dwelling was confirmed. The ruins, which were discovered in almost perfect condition, are estimated to be about 4500 years old and as the existence of such flagstone-floored dwelling in southern Kantō was regarded as rare at the time, it was designated as a National Historic Site in 1930. The main part of the building has a major axis of 4.3 meters and a minor axis of 3.3 meters, with an overhang on the east side with a width of 0.8 meters and a length of 1.4 meters. In the center was a hexagonal hearth with six large cut stones. The flagstones are flat stones with a diameter of 20 to 50 centimeters and the gaps in between are filled with small stones.

Many relics were found in the ruins, including stone axes, stone tools, and Jōmon pottery. Currently the is site is preserved by a shelter and is open to the public The site is a short walk from the "Tsukui Fire Station" bus stop on the Kanagawa Bus from Sagamiko Station on the JR East Chūō Main Line.

A hexagonal building was built around the site in order to protect it.

== Discovery ==
In June 1928, a farmer local farmer came across the site while plowing a field. After performing an excavation, it identified by Hasegawa Ichirō as the remains of a Jōmon pit-house. This was the first of this kind of Jōmon settlement to be found in Kanagawa. The site was discovered at the same time that archaeologists in Japan began to study historic settlements, and as a result it was an invaluable find.

== See also ==
- List of Historic Sites of Japan (Kanagawa)
