= Maginu Kofun =

Kofun period burial mound in Kawasaki, Japan

Magninu Kofun
- 馬絹古墳 (Japanese)
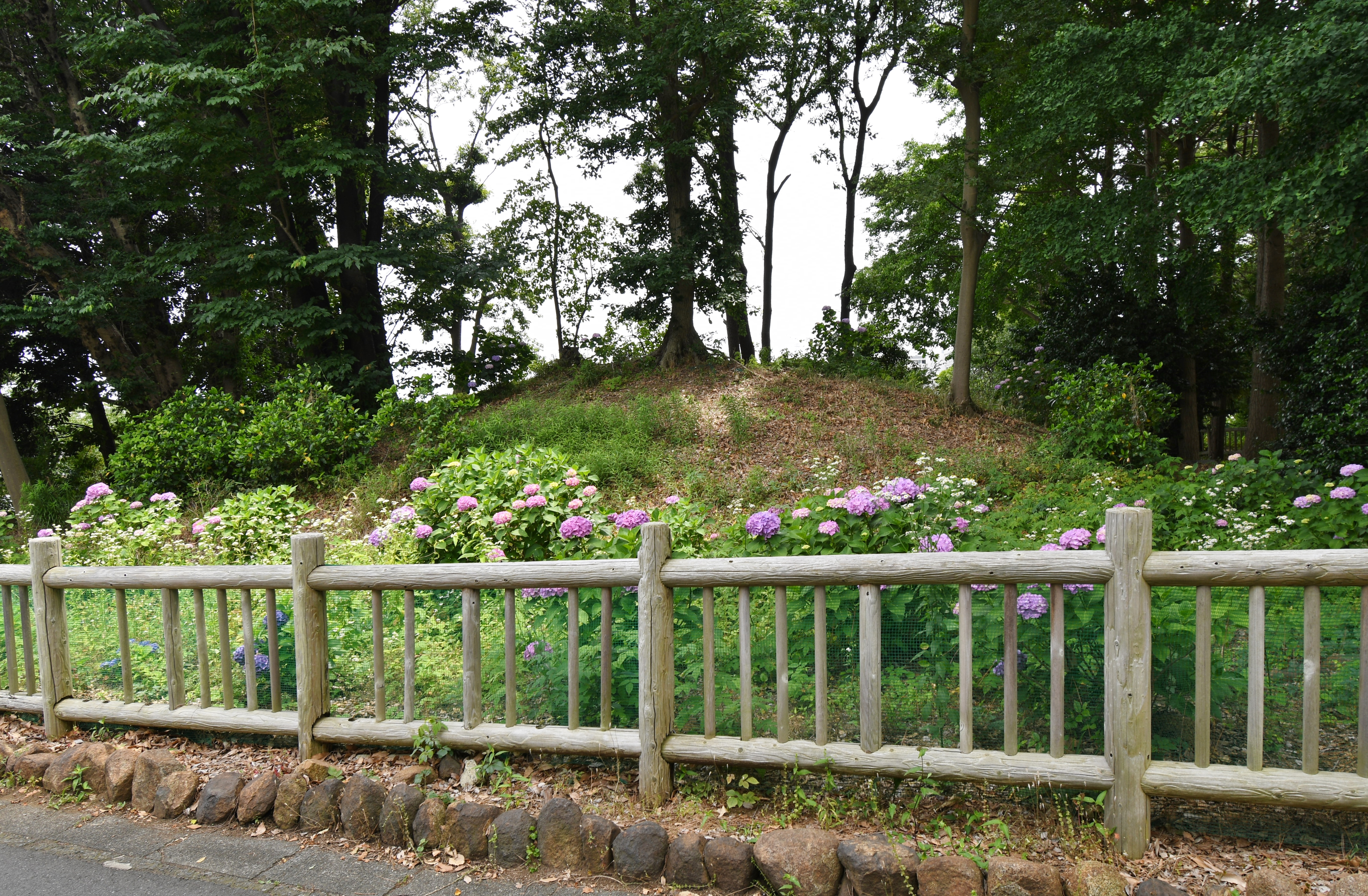
- Magninu Kofun

- Magninu Kofun Maginu Kofun (Japan)
- Interactive map of Magninu Kofun
- 35°35′1.3″N 139°36′3.5″E
- Type: Kofun
- Periods: Kofun period
- Location: 994-2 Maginu, Miyamae-ku, Kawasaki, Kanagawa, Japan
- Region: Kantō region

History
- Built: mid-7th century

Site notes
- Public access: Yes (no facilities)
- Kanagawa Prefecture Historic Site

The Maginu Kofun (馬絹古墳) is the name for a Kofun period burial mound, located in the Miyamae ward of the city of Kawasaki, Kanagawa in the Kantō region of Japan. The tumulus was designated a Kanagawa Prefecture Historic Site in 1948.The tumulus was excavated in 1971 due to plans for residential development.

== Overview ==
The Maginu Kofun is an enfun (円墳) circular tumulus, located on the southern slope of a hill with an elevation of approximately 43 meters above sea level, overlooking the alluvial plain of the Yagami River. It has a diameter of 33 meters and a height of six meters, and is surrounded by a 3.5-meter-wide, 1.5 meter deep moat, except for the southeast side. The northern surface was covered with a single layer of fist-size fukiishi revetment stones, whereas the eastern, southern and western surfaces with a double layer. The construction method was one tier on the northwest side, two tiers on the northeast and southwest sides, and three tiers on the southeast side, using a rammed earth method, based on alternating layers of loam and black soil.The layers were piled relatively thickly from the base towards the center, and the burial chamber was constructed parallel to this. After this, the rammed earth layers were sloped diagonally towards the burial chamber, and extremely thin layers were piled up. Remnants of mudstone used as building material for the burial chamber were found mixed in the rammed earth layers around the chamber. The supporting base of the chamber was excavated semi-underground into the natural loam soil.

The main burial facility is a double-chambered horizontal-entry stone burial chamber with an entrance opening to the south-southeast. It is primarily constructed of cut mudstone masonry. It measures 9.6 meters in total length, with the burial chamber itself approximately three by three meters, and 3 meters high. The structure of the entrance passage differs from typical chambers, being divided into three sections using pillar stones. Similar burial chambers have been found at other locations, such as the Kitaotani Kofun in Tokyo. Furthermore, the fact that the most important inner chamber measures approximately three meters in length, width, and height suggests it was designed using the Tang dynasty unit of measurement (1 shaku = 29.6 centimeters). The chamber measures 2.64 meters at the back, 1.5 meters in the center, and 1.5 meters at the front. A single stone, 2.2 meters high and 1 to 1.6 meters wide, forms the back wall of the chamber. The chamber's plan is square, but it becomes more cylindrical towards the top, with a circular ceiling stone and prominent corbelling on the side walls. White clay was applied to the joints of the side wall stones of the chamber, and circular and indistinct patterns were observed in white clay on the back wall and left wall of the chamber.Small pebbles covered the entire floor of the chamber.

The interior of the burial chamber had already been looted by the time of the 1971 excavation, so no grave goods are known. However, 79 iron nails, believed to have been used to fasten wooden coffins, were discovered, mainly in the back chamber. Based on this quantity and location, it is estimated that there were once multiple wooden coffins.

The construction date is estimated to be the mid-7th century.

The tumulus is approximately 1.2 kilometers south of Kajigaya Station on the Den-en-toshi Line. and it is preserved as a park.

== See also ==
- List of Historic Sites of Japan (Kanagawa)
