= Kawajiri Stone Age Site =

Archaeological site in Japan

- 川尻石器時代遺跡 (Japanese)
- Kawajiri Stone Age Site Kawajiri Stone Age Site (Japan)
- 35°35′30″N 139°18′01″E
- Type: settlement trace
- Periods: Jōmon period
- Location: Sagamihara, Kanagawa, Japan
- Region: Kantō region

Site notes
- Area: 23,356.62 m^{2} (251,408.6 sq ft)
- Public access: Yes (no public facilities)

The Kawajiri Stone Age Site (川尻石器時代遺跡, Kawajiri shisekki-jidai iseki) is an archaeological site in the Tanigahara neighborhood of Midori-ku, Sagamihara, Kanagawa Prefecture, in the southern Kantō region of Japan containing a middle to late Jōmon period settlement trace. It was designated a National Historic Site of Japan in 1931, with then area under protection expanded in 2006.

== Overview ==
Kawajiri Stone Age Site is located on the north bank fluvial terrace of the Sagami River where the river changes course from east to south after it emerges onto the Sagami Plain. The site has long been known to be rich in relics, and per an archaeological excavation conducted in 1929 the remains of a flagstone-floored Jōmon period pit dwelling was confirmed. The ruin were estimated to be between 3000 and 4000 years old, and as the existence of such flagstone-floored dwelling in southern Kantō was regarded as rare at the time, it was designated as a National Historic Site in 1931. Since then, the area has been repeated excavated, and by time of the 1989 survey, the remains of forty-six pit dwellings from the middle Jōmon period and one flagstone-floored dwelling from then late Jōmon period were confirmed. In addition, the traces of a Kofun period to Heian period settlement was also discovered, indicating that the area had been a settlement for many centuries. In total, more than 80 dwelling sites have been identified. Artifacts included stone axes, whetstones, jar-shaped Jōmon pottery, and clay figurines. In addition to the dwelling traces, a number of stone-lined tombs were also found.

The National Historic Site designation was expanded in 2006 to cover these additional discoveries. The site is located a five-minute walk from the "Kubosawa" bus stop on the Kanagawa Bus from Hashimoto Station on the JR East Yokohama Line.

== See also ==
- List of Historic Sites of Japan (Kanagawa)
