= Akibayama Kofun Cluster =

Group of Kofun period burial mounds in Ebina, Japan

Akibayama Kofun cluster
- 秋葉山古墳群 (Japanese)
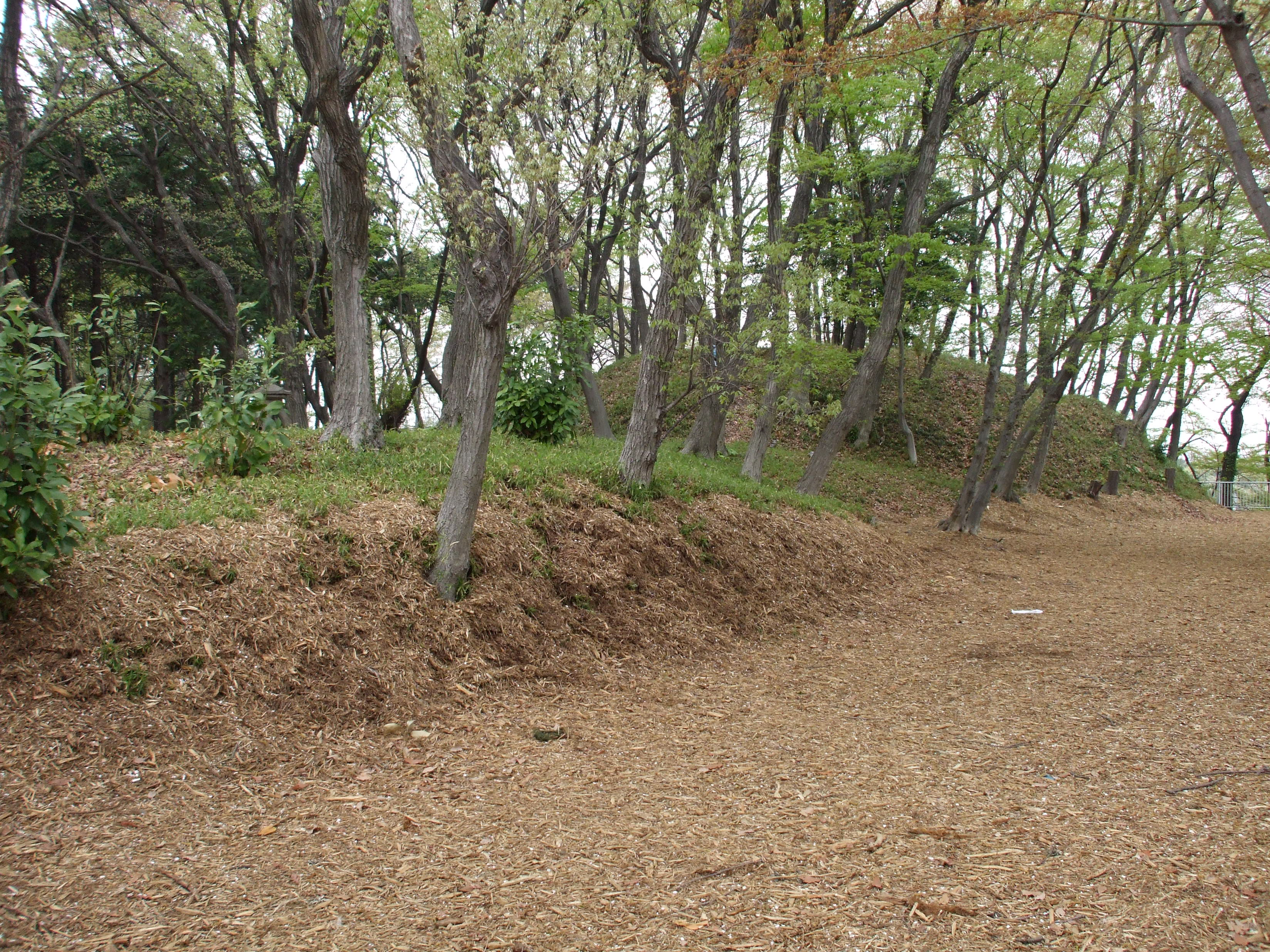
- Akibayama Kofun No.1

- Akibayama Kofun cluster Akibayama Kofun Cluster (Japan)
- 35°28′12″N 139°24′15″E
- Type: kofun
- Periods: Kofun period
- Location: Ebina, Kanagawa, Japan
- Region: Kantō region

History
- Built: 4th century AD

Site notes
- Elevation: 10 m (33 ft)
- Public access: Yes (park)

The Akibayama Kofun cluster (秋葉山古墳群, Akibayama kofun-gun) is a group of Kofun period burial mounds located in the Kamiimaizumi neighborhood of the city of Ebina, Kanagawa Prefecture in the southern Kantō region of Japan. The cluster was designated a National Historic Site in 2005.

== Overview ==
The site is located on a ridge in the Zama Hills with an elevation of 75 to 80 meters, approximately two kilometers east of the Sagami River. The site has been known since at least the Meiji period. It consists of a total of six tumuli and takes its name from the presence of an Akiba Shrine on the summit of Kofun No.2, which at 84.6 meters, was the highest elevation in Ebina City. In addition to these six mounds, records indicate the presence of many more kofun in this area which have been destroyed due to urban encroachment, especially since residential land development began in the mid-1960s. A survey of the burial mounds was conducted in 1969. From 1987 to 2003, twelve archaeological excavations were carried out, revealing that this may be the oldest tumulus group in Kanagawa Prefecture, but even after the survey, portions of the site were destroyed until protection was received in 2005 with the National Historic Site designation.

Although these tumuli are large for the Sagami River basin, they are all single-tier construction, with no fukiishi or haniwa, and are smaller than the roughly contemporary Nagae-Sakurayama Kofun in Hayama to the south, so it can be presumed that these were the graves of local chieftains or kings, but their position vis-a-vis the Yamato Empire was not very high. Their location on the Sagami River and the ancient highway towards Musashi Province (roughly Japan National Route 246) indicates that the location was a transportation hub, although no large settlement site has yet been discovered.

=== Akibayama Kofun No.1 ===
This is a zenpō-kōen-fun (前方後円墳), which is shaped like a keyhole, having one square end and one circular end, when viewed from above. It is believed to have been built in the late 4th century AD. It has a well-defined shape with a length of 59 meters, a posterior circle diameter of 33 meters, and an anterior length of 26 meters. The height of the front portion is 2.8 meters, and the height of the rear circular portion is 6.3 meters. There does not appear to have been a complete moat, but a groove was dug only in front of the anterior portion. From this tumulus, small round-bottomed earthenware and iron artifacts have been excavated. The pottery is the same as that excavated in various parts of Japan, as opposed to Kofun No. 2 and No. 3 where local only pottery from the Sagami area were found.

=== Akibayama Kofun No.2 ===
This keyhole-shaped tumulus was built from the end of the 3rd century to the beginning of the 4th century AD. It has a total length of 50.5 meters, with a 33-meter diameter rear circle, and 17.5 meter-long rectangular portion. The height of the front portion is 4.6 meters, and the height of the rear circle part is 7.7 meters. The front portion is shorter than the diameter of the rear circle, so this is not a typical keyhole-shaped tumulus but does have some similarities with Kofun No. 3. As with Kofun No. 1, there is not a true moat, but a groove is dug only in front of the front portion. A large number of grave goods were excavated from this tumulus, including pottery from the Tokai and Kansai regions along with the local Sagami pottery. Some of the pottery was colored with mercury vermilion. In addition, four cylindrical pottery objects, which were distributed mainly in Okayama prefecture at the end of the Yayoi period were discovered. Many of the pottery items excavated from Kofun No. 2 were found to have been buried in a deliberately crushed state after a ritual ceremony using fire. Radiocarbon dating gave a date from 250 to 325 AD.

=== Akibayama Kofun No.3 ===
This is another keyhole-shaped tumulus that was built from the end of the 3rd century to the beginning of the 4th century. The rear circle is slightly distorted, and the front square portion (which is known from written records) was destroyed in the early twentieth century. It is estimated that the tumulus had a length of 51 meters, with a rear circle diameter of 38 to 40 meters, and as with Kofun No.2, the front rectangular portion was smaller than the diameter of the circular portion. The height of the rear circle is 7.7 meters. Unlike Kofun No.1 and No.2, this tumulus had a complete moat. Per excavations, a large grave pit measuring nine meters by six to seven meters was found at the top of the circular portion, but the actual burial chamber could not be discerned. This is a characteristic of Yayoi period tumuli, and together with the truncated style of the keyhole-shape of this tumulus, indicates that it belongs to a transitional stage between Yayoi and Kofun cultures. As with Kofun No.2, large mercury vermilion jars were excavated from the top of the grave, which are thought to be associated with the burial ceremony. In addition, there was a large amount of pottery which originated in the Ise Bay area of the Tōkai region.

=== Akibayama Kofun No.4 ===
This is a "two conjoined rectangles" style zenpō-kōhō-fun (前方後方墳) with a total length of 37.5 meters. The front square is 12.7 meters on each side with a height of 2.8 meters, and the rear square is 24.8 meters on each side with a height of 5.3 meters. A moat has been confirmed in the rear part, but it is highly possible that there was no moat in the front portion. Only a few fragments of jars have been excavated from this tumulus, but are the oldest pottery found in the Akihayama burial mounds. It is considered to be the oldest tumulus in the Akihayama Kofun group and was built in the 3rd century AD.

=== Akibayama Kofun No.5 ===
This is a square-style hōfun (方墳) with 20.0-meter sides and a height of 5.4 meters, surrounded by a complete moat with a width of four meters and a depth of one meter. Pottery from the 4th century indicates that this was the last of kofun to have been built in the group.

=== Akibayama Kofun No.6 ===
This tumulus is located 250 meters north of Kofun No. 4 and was added to the National Historic Site designation only in 2006. No detailed investigation has been conducted so far, and details are unknown.

== See also ==
- List of Historic Sites of Japan (Kanagawa)
