= Kamaguchi Kofun =

Kofun period burial mound in Ōiso, Japan

- 釜口古墳 (Japanese)
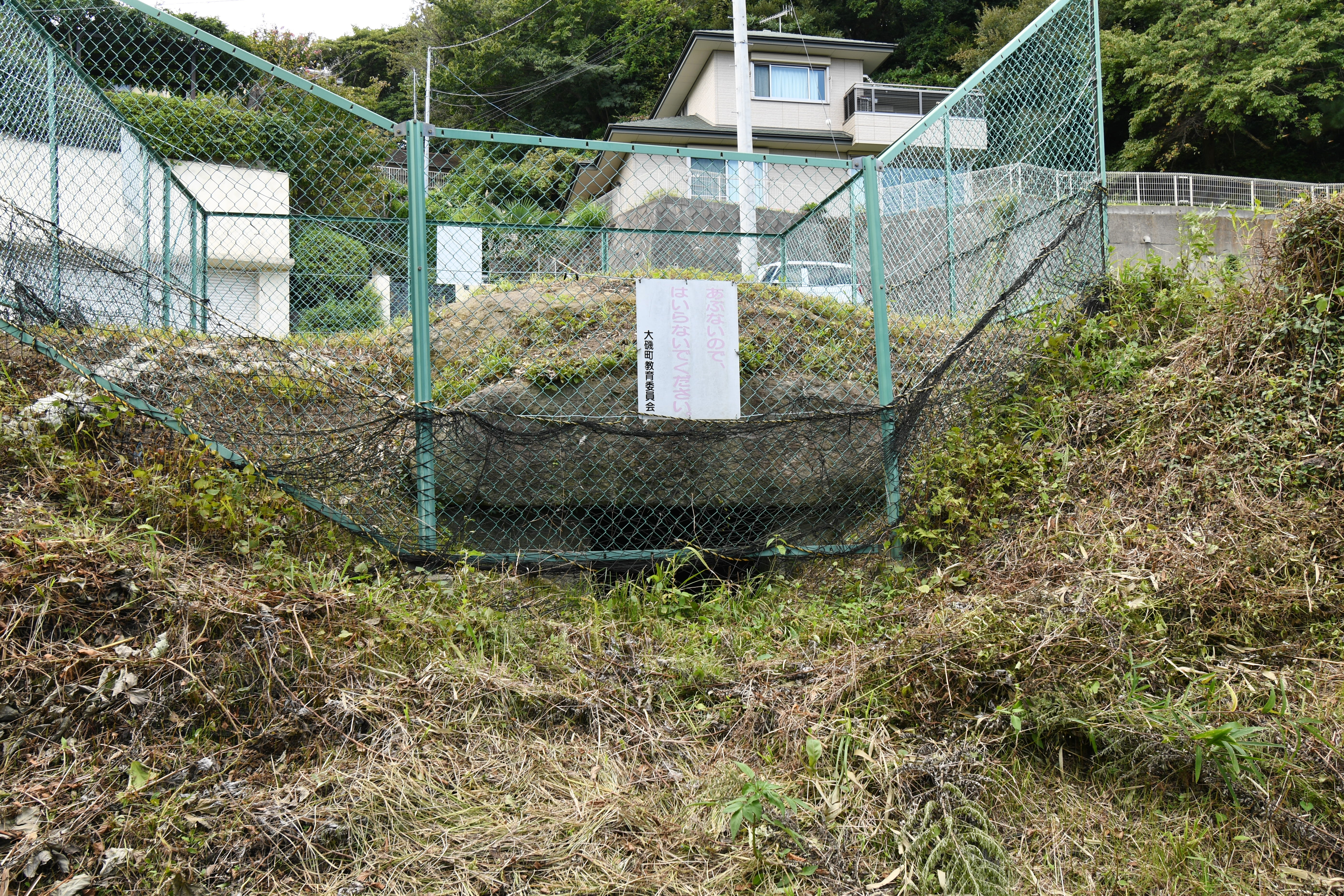
- Kamaguchi Kofun

- Kamaguchi Kofun Kamaguchi Kofun (Japan)
- Interactive map of Kamaguchi Kofun
- 35°19′2.97″N 139°19′6.65″E
- Type: Kofun
- Periods: Kofun period
- Location: Ōiso, Kanagawa Prefecture, Japan
- Region: Kantō region

History
- Built: late-7th to early 8th century

Site notes
- Public access: No
- Kanagawa Prefecture Historic Site

The Kamaguchi Kofun (釜口古墳) is the name for a Kofun period burial mound, located in the town of Ōiso, Kanagawa in the Kantō region of Japan. The tumulus was designated a Kanagawa Prefecture Historic Site in 1954.

== Overview ==
The Kamaguchi Kofun is located on the eastern saddle of a ridge extending southwest from Komayama in southern Kanagawa Prefecture. The name "Kamaguchi" comes from its appearance resembling the opening of a cauldron. The late Edo period "Shinpen Sagami no Kuni Fudoki-ko" (New Compilation of the Topography of Sagami Province) mentions an opening, and an archaeological excavation was conducted in 1953.

Only the earth covering the burial mound remains to the extent of covering the ceiling stones of the burial chamber, so the original shape of the mound is unclear. The burial facility is a horizontal-entry stone burial chamber opening to the south. The tomb is constructed of irregularly laid cut tuff stones, measuring 2.92 meters in length, 2.64 meters in width, and approximately two meters in height. Large single stones are used for the back wall and ceiling, while square-column cut stones are used for the entrance. Although the tomb has been looted, investigations have uncovered small, lotus-shaped bronze artifacts (copper spoons), iron arrowhead fragments, and Sue ware pottery fragments. The bronze artifacts, in particular, are noteworthy as Buddhist relics. The tomb is estimated to have been constructed during the late 7th to early 8th centuries, the end of the Kofun period.

The tumulus is approximately 1.6 kilometers northeast of Ōiso Station on the JR East Tōkaidō Main Line.

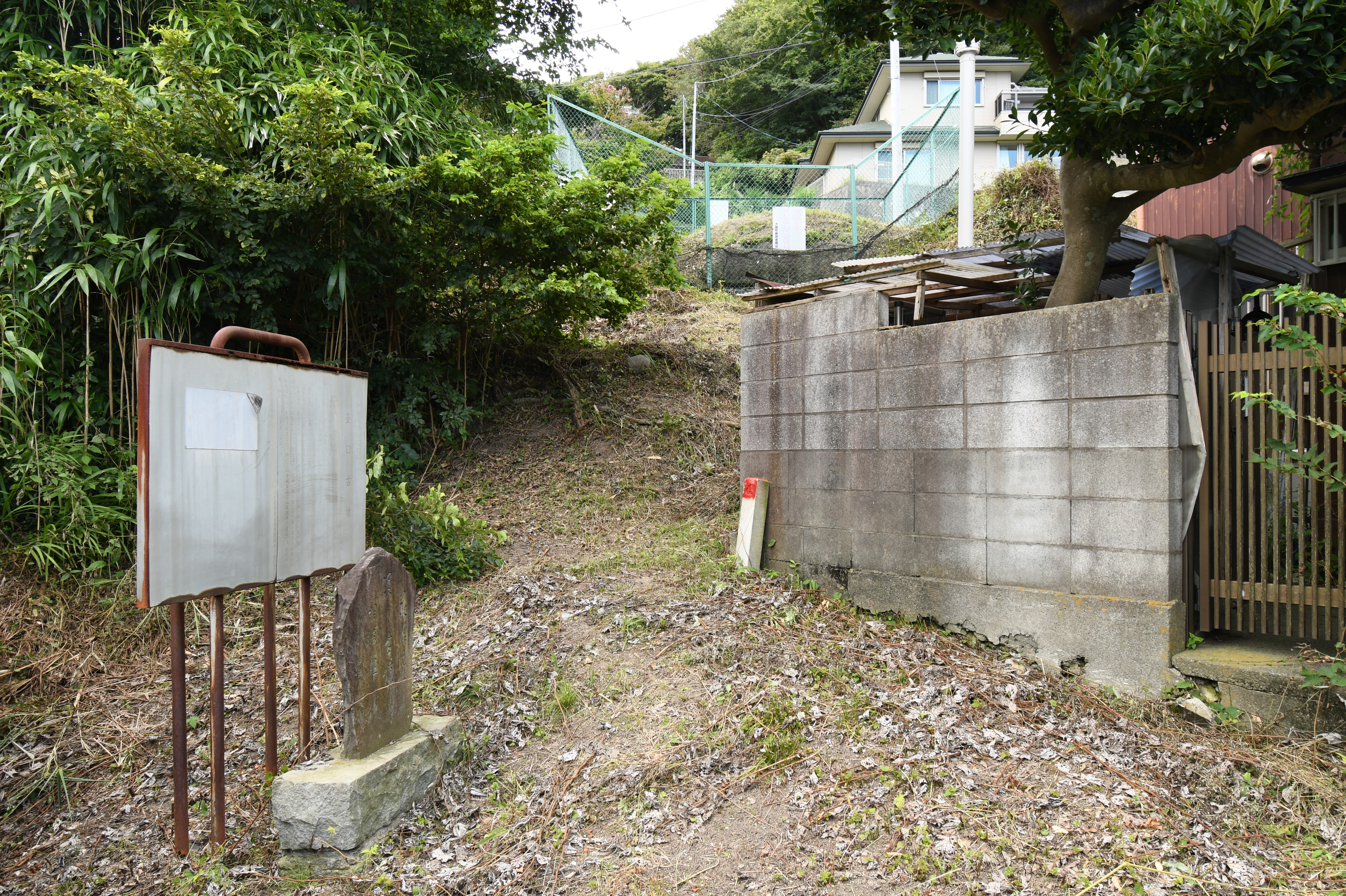
Near the information board (the entrance to the kofun is in the upper right background).

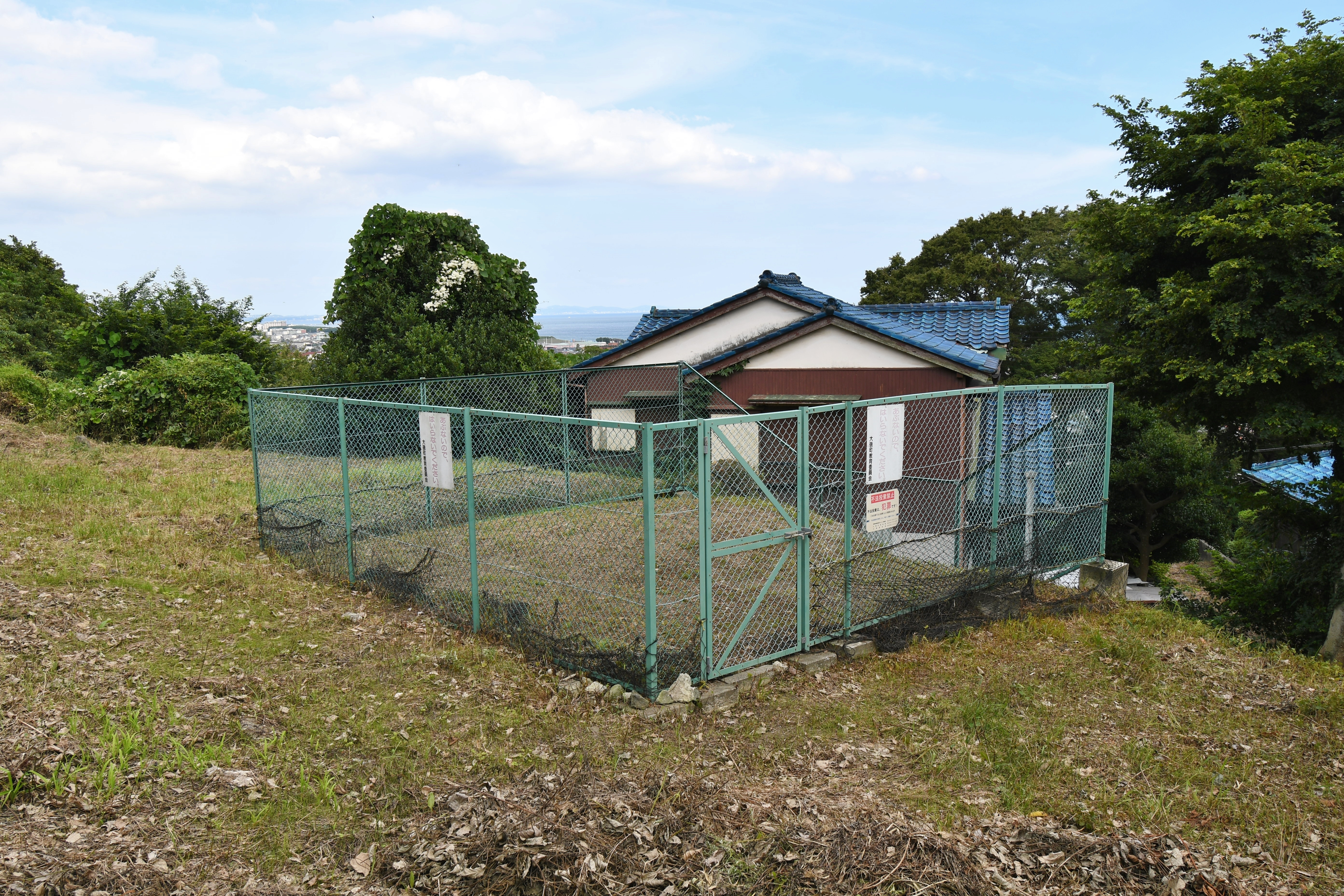
Top of the burial mound

== See also ==
- List of Historic Sites of Japan (Kanagawa)
