= Akasaka Site =

Archaeological site in Miura, Japan

Akasaka Archaeological Site
- 赤坂遺跡 (Japanese)
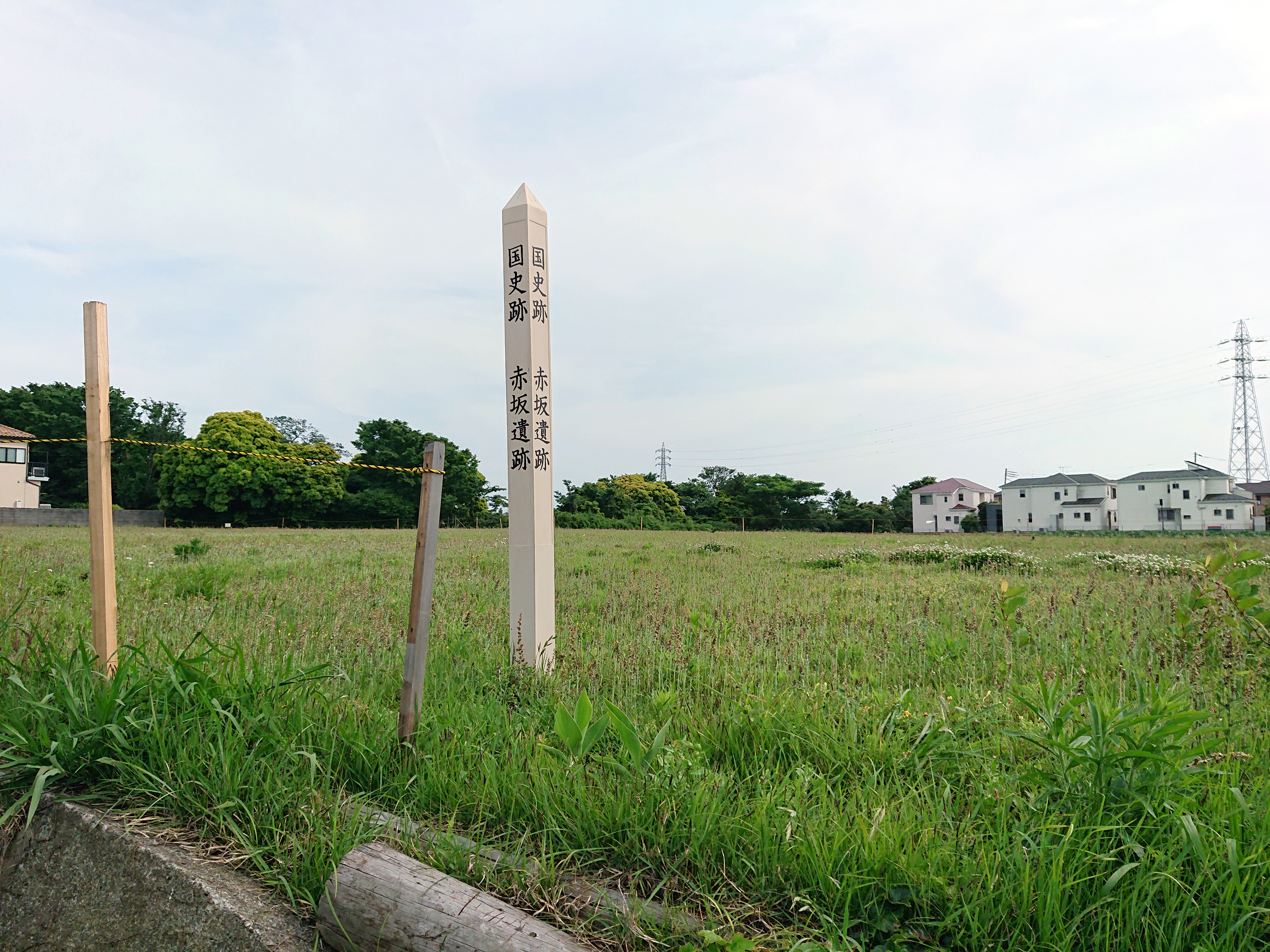
- Akasaka Archaeological Site

- Akasaka Archaeological Site Akasaka Site (Japan)
- 35°10′28″N 139°38′03″E
- Type: settlement
- Periods: Yayoi period
- Location: Miura, Kanagawa, Japan
- Region: Kantō region

Site notes
- Area: 4,700 m^{2} (51,000 sq ft)
- Public access: Yes (no public facilities)

The Akasaka Archaeological Site (赤坂遺跡, Akasaka iseki) is an archaeological site containing the ruins of a middle to late Yayoi period settlement located in the Hasse neighborhood of the city of Miura, Kanagawa Prefecture in the southern Kantō region of Japan. The site was designated a National Historic Site of Japan in 2011.

== Overview ==
The Akasaka site is located in the southern part of the Miura Peninsula, approximately 350 meters south of Keikyū Misakiguchi Station, on a hill with an elevation of 50 meters. It was first excavated by a team from Tokyo Imperial University, which published a paper in 1897. During the late 1920s, construction work on a road from Japan National Route 134 to a coastal villa for the Japanese Imperial Family in the neighborhood revealed the foundations of a pit dwelling, which was recorded by local archaeologist Dr Naotada Akaboshi, who identified earthward shards recovered as Yayoi pottery. After World War II, a total of 24 excavations were conducted by teams from Rikkyo University, the Miura City Board of Education and the Yokosuka Archaeological Society from 1966 to 2007. A total of 130 pit dwellings sites were identified, including the traces of a huge building measuring 15.0 by 12.2 meters and a shell midden. In addition to Yayoi pottery, artifacts included bronze products (swords, rings), iron products (iron fish hooks, needles, iron axes), accessories (glass beads, shell bracelets), stone axes, as well as organic relics (carbonized rice, walnuts, peaches), animal bones (deer, wild boar), and bone tools, and shells. One surprising discovery was that the material of the stone axes discovered was from the Hokushin (northern Nagano Prefecture) region of Japan, indicating that extensive long distance trade existed during this period. A number of these artifacts were designated a Tangible Cultural Properties of Miura City in 2017 and are stored and displayed at the Akasaka Yayoi Study Room (赤坂弥生学習室, Akasaka Yayoi gakushū-shitsu) in Miura city.

The area designated as a national historic site is about 4,700 square meters, but the actual area of the ruins including its surroundings measures about 70,000 square meters.

== See also ==
- List of Historic Sites of Japan (Kanagawa)
