= Futagozuka Kofun (Hadano) =

Kofun period burial mound in Hadano, Japan

- 二子塚古墳 (Japanese)
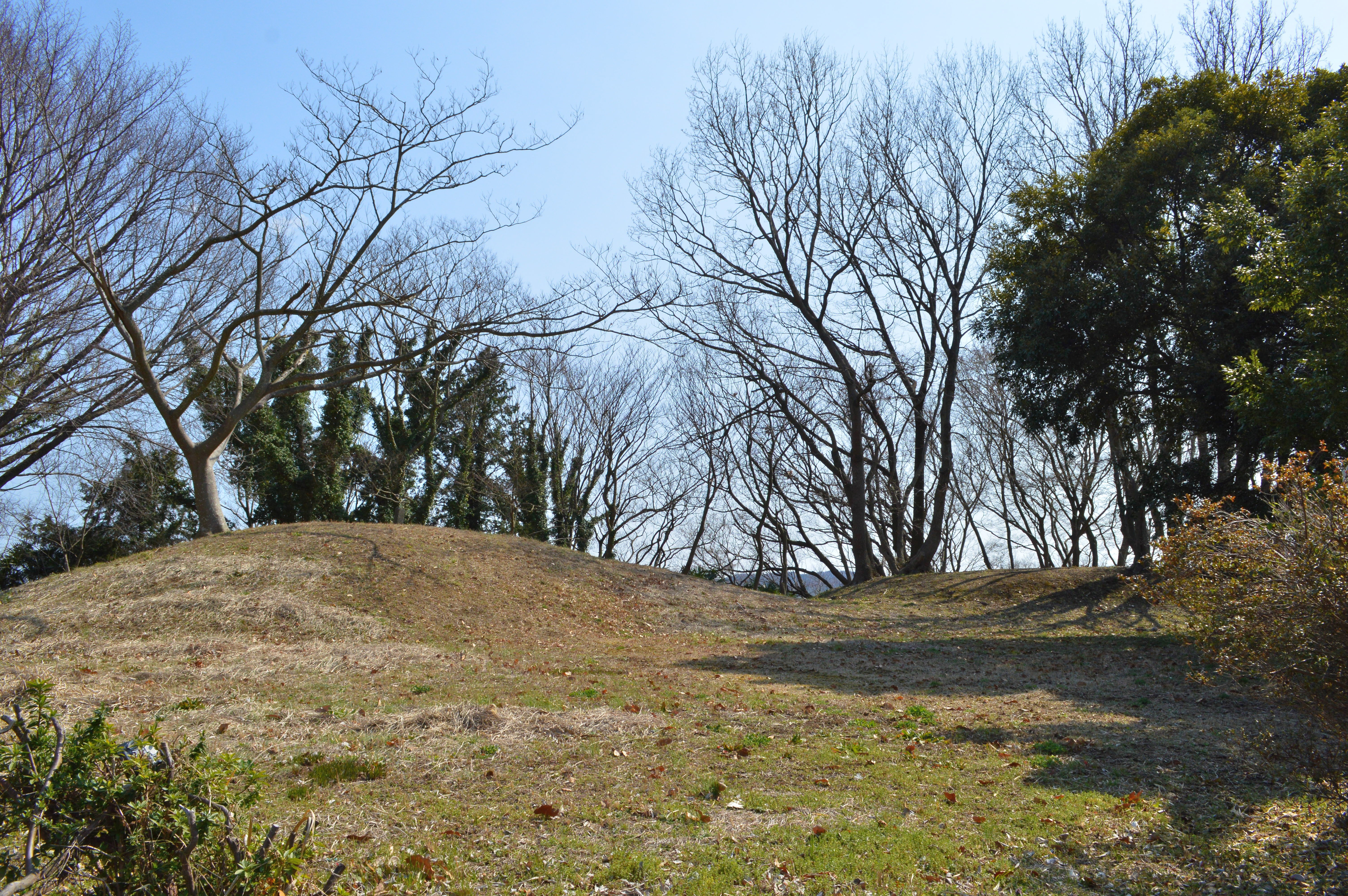
- Futagozuka Kofun

- Futagozuka Kofun Futagozuka Kofun (Hadano) (Japan)
- Interactive map of Futagozuka Kofun
- 35°21′33.74″N 139°16′0.42″E
- Type: Kofun
- Periods: Kofun period
- Location: Shimoōzuki, Hadano, Kanagawa Prefecture, Japan
- Region: Kantō region

History
- Built: late-7th to early 8th century

Site notes
- Public access: No
- Kanagawa Prefecture Historic Site

The Futagozuka Kofun (二子塚古墳) is the name for a Kofun period burial mound, located in the Shimoōzuki neighborhood of the city of Hadano, Kanagawa in the Kantō region of Japan. The tumulus was designated a Kanagawa Prefecture Historic Site in 1983. The artifacts excavated from the kofun are collectively designated as an Hadano City Tangible Cultural Property.

== Overview ==
The Futagozuka Kofun is a zenpō-kōen-fun (前方後円墳), which is shaped like a keyhole, having one square end and one circular end, when viewed from above. It is located on the tip of the Yakushihara Plateau on the left bank of the Kaname River in southern Kanagawa Prefecture, overlooking the Sagami Plain. It is the only keyhole-shaped burial mound in the Hadano City area. Archaeological excavations were conducted in 1970 and in 2008. .

The mound is orientated with the front section facing northeast. The burial facility is a single-chambered horizontal-entry stone burial chamber in the posterior circular section, opening to the southeast, but it has been damaged and its details are unclear. Numerous grave goods, including a complete silver-decorated sword, , iron arrowheads, earrings, beads, and Sue ware pottery have been unearthed. The silver-plated sword was found on a gravel bed at the edge of the northeast side wall of the burial chamber. It was broken into five pieces because it was buried under stones from a collapsed wall. The scabbard end fitting with inlay was found on a gravel bed near the center of the burial chamber, and earrings were discovered nearby. Based on these findings, the construction date is estimated to be the late 6th century, during the late Kofun period.

Total length
46 meters:
Anterior rectangular portion
25 meters wide
Posterior circular portion
33 x 26 diameter

The tumulus is approximately three kilometers southwest of Tōkaidaigaku-mae Station on the Odakyu Odawara Line.

== See also ==
- List of Historic Sites of Japan (Kanagawa)
