= Saifukuji Kofun =

Kofun period burial mound in Kawasaki, Japan

- 西福寺古墳 (Japanese)
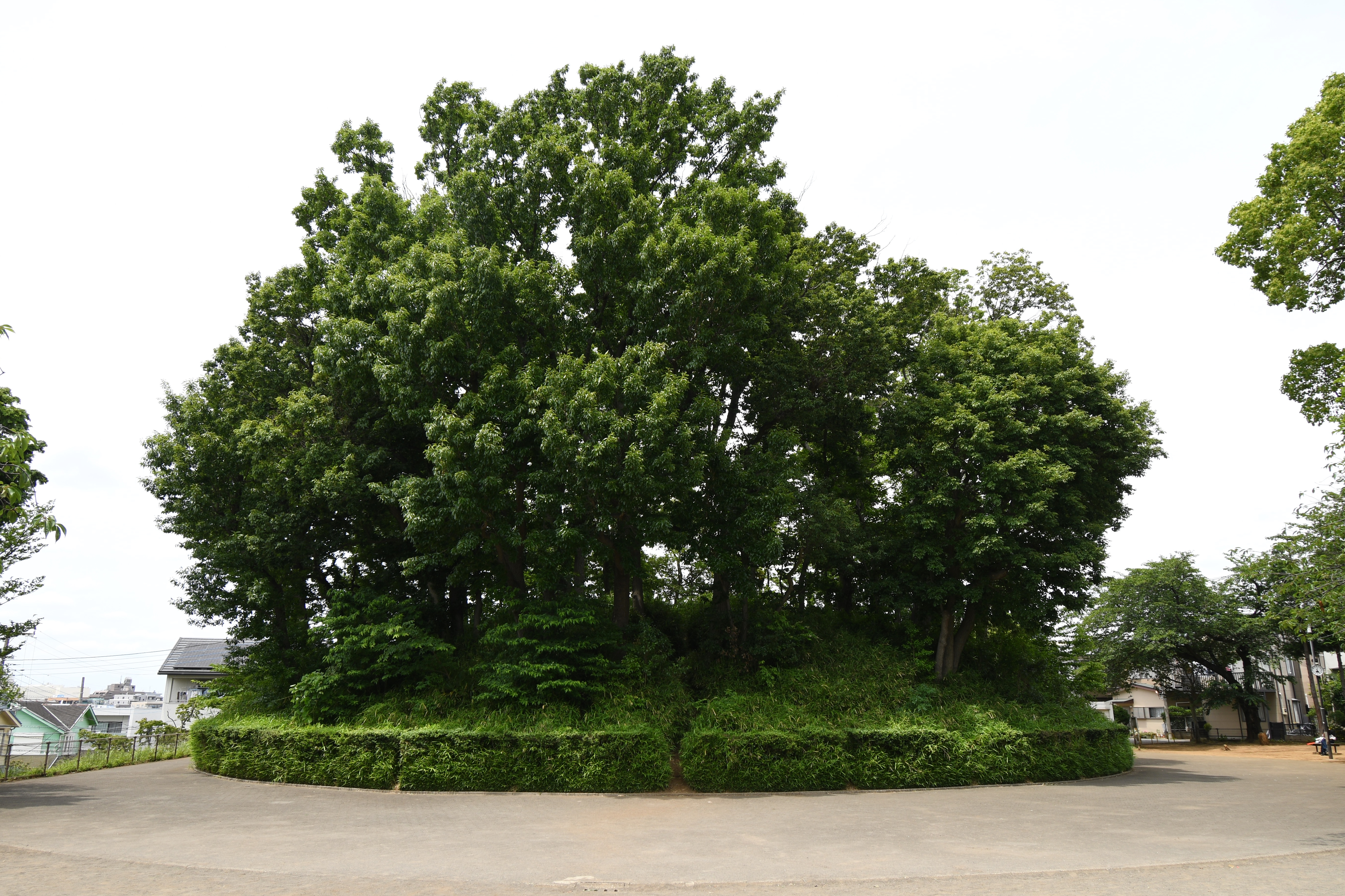
- Saifukuji Kofun

- Saifukuji Kofun Saifukuji Kofun (Kanagawa Prefecture) Saifukuji Kofun (Japan)
- Interactive map of Saifukuji Kofun
- 35°35′10.07″N 139°36′26.70″E
- Type: Kofun
- Periods: Kofun period
- Location: Kajigaya, Takatsu-ku, Kawasaki, Kanagawa, Japan
- Region: Kantō region

History
- Built: late 5th to early 6th century

Site notes
- Public access: Yes (park)
- Kanagawa Prefecture Historic Site

The Saifukuji Kofun (西福寺古墳) is the name for a Kofun period burial mound, located in the Takatsu ward of the city of Kawasaki, Kanagawa in the Kantō region of Japan. The tumulus was designated a Kanagawa Prefecture Historic Site in 1980. It is one of the burial mounds that make up the Makinu-Kajigaya Kofun cluster.

== Overview ==
The Saifukuji Kofun is an enpun (円墳) circular tumulus, located on a hilly plateau on the left bank of the Yagami River in northeastern Kanagawa Prefecture. The surrounding terrain is a somewhat elongated plateau running north-south, with an elevation of around 46 meters. The burial mound occupies the southern part of this plateau, and a triangulation point indicating an elevation of 52.02 meters is placed at the top of the mound. Looking south from there, one can see the Yagami River and the alluvial plain that opens up along its course. The tumulus has a diameter of 35 meters and a height of 5.5 meters, and is surrounded by a 6-7.5 meter-wide, 0.8 meter deep dry moat. Cylindrical haniwa (including morning glory-shaped haniwa) and figurative haniwa (waterfowl-shaped haniwa) are found on the outer surface of the mound, and are believed to have been produced at the Shiraizaka Haniwa Kiln Site (Inukura, Miyamae-ku, Kawasaki) The burial facilities are unknown as the tumulus has not been excavated. The construction period is estimated to be the late 5th to early 6th century, during the middle to late Kofun period, based on the characteristics of the cylindrical haniwa.

The tumulus is approximately 2.1 kilometers south of Musashi-Mizonokuchi Station on the JR East Nambu Line. It is currently preserved within Kajigaya 3rd Children's Park.

== See also ==
- List of Historic Sites of Japan (Kanagawa)
