= Isehara Hachimandai Stone Age Dwelling Site =

Archaeological site in Japan

- 伊勢原八幡台石器時代住居跡 (Japanese)
- Isehara Hachimandai Stone Age Dwelling Site Isehara Hachimandai Stone Age Dwelling Site (Japan)
- 35°23′20″N 139°18′31″E
- Type: settlement
- Periods: Jōmon period
- Location: Isehara, Kanagawa, Japan
- Region: Kantō region

Site notes
- Discovered: 1934
- Public access: Yes (no public facilities)

The Isehara Hachimandai Stone Age Dwelling Site (伊勢原八幡台石器時代住居跡, Isehara Hachimandai sekki-jidai jūkyo ato) is an archaeological site containing the ruins of a Jōmon period settlement located in what is now the Hachimandai neighborhood of the city of Isehara, Kanagawa Prefecture in the southern Kantō region of Japan. The site was designated a National Historic Site of Japan in 1934.

== Overview ==
The Isehara Hachimandai site is located on a tongue-shaped ridge between the Suzukawa and Shibata Rivers. The foundations of an oval-shaped pit dwelling with an andesite flagstone floor was found in 1933. The pit dwelling measured six meters from north to south and 3.4 meters from east-to-west. These andesite flagstones were from the Nebukawa area of what is now Odawara, and thus had to be transported a considerable distance to this site. In 1934, a second pit dwelling remnant was discovered 150 meters away. It was roughly circular, with a diameter of 8.5 meters, and also had a flagstone floor made of round river stones. At the time, only a few pit dwellings from the middle to late Jōmon period (approximately 3500 years ago) with flagstone floors has been discovered, leading to the protection of these ruins as a National Historic Site. In 1979, new excavations found a third pit dwelling trace adjacent to the second building, and per a survey conducted in 1990, two raised-floor structures, a fourth pit dwelling and 19 graves with pottery sarcophagus were discovered, along with a quantity of Jōmon pottery shards.

The site is located about a 15-minute walk from Isehara Station on the Odakyu Electric Railway Odawara Line. The ruins were backfilled after excavation and only an explanatory placard is at the site.

== See also ==
- List of Historic Sites of Japan (Kanagawa)
