= Katsusaka Site =

Archaeological site in Japan

- 勝坂遺跡 (Japanese)
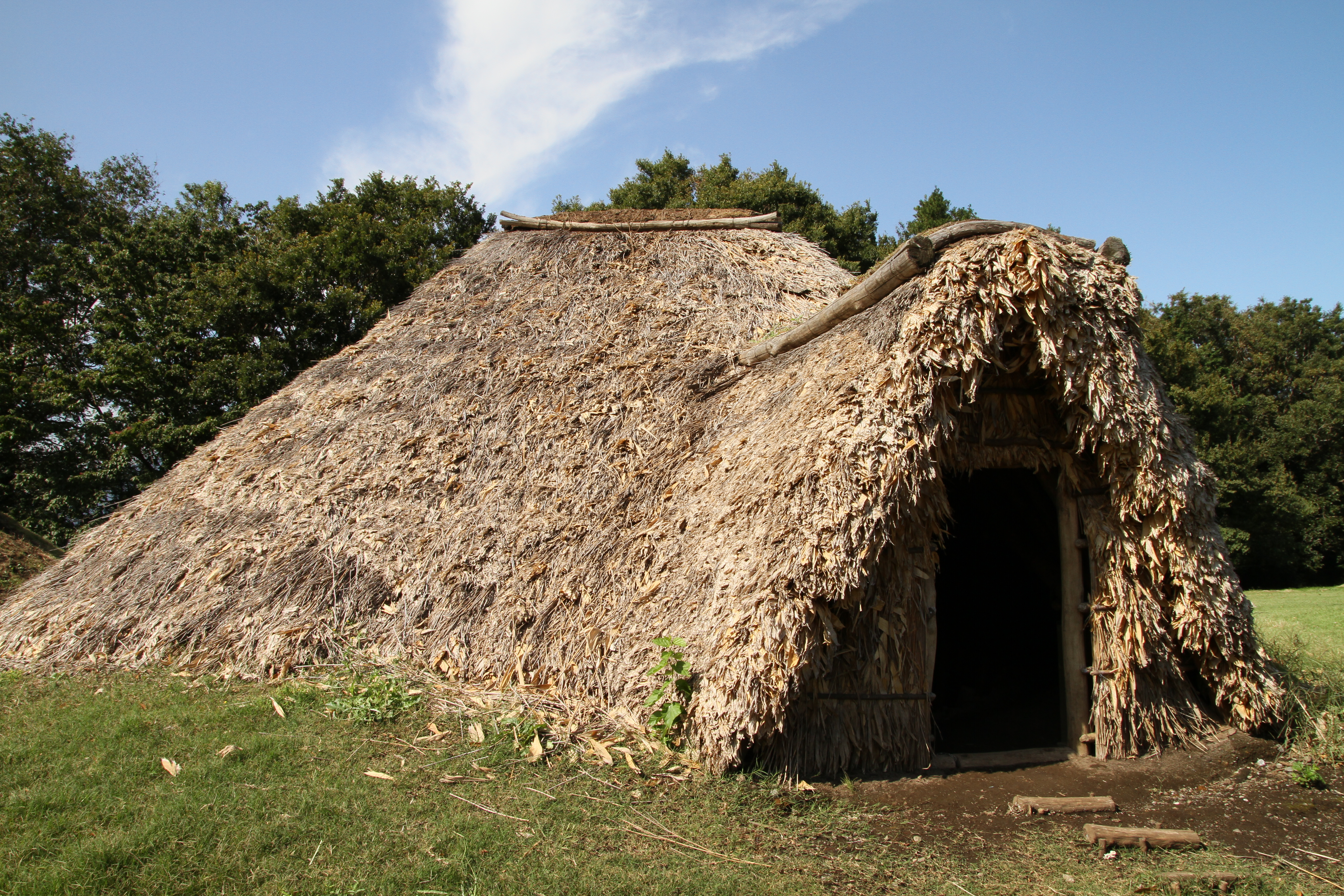
- Restored pit dwelling at Katsusaka Site

- Katsusaka Site Katsusaka Site (Japan)
- 35°30′32″N 139°23′18″E
- Type: settlement
- Periods: Jōmon period
- Location: Sagamihara, Kanagawa, Japan
- Region: Kantō region

Site notes
- Area: 42,951 m^{2} (462,320 sq ft)
- Discovered: 1926
- Public access: Yes (archaeological park)

The Katsusaka Site (勝坂遺跡, Katsusaka iseki) is an archaeological site containing the ruins of a large Jōmon period settlement located in what is now the Isobe neighborhood of Minami-ku, Sagamihara, Kanagawa Prefecture in the southern Kantō region of Japan. The site was designated a National Historic Site of Japan in 1974, with the area designated expanded in 1980, 1984, 2006 and 2019. The site was first discovered by Kashiwa Oyama (the son of General Oyama Iwao) in 1926.

== Overview ==
The Katsusaka Site is located on a river terrace on the eastern bank of the Sagami River at an elevation of 70 meters above sea level. The ruins are divided into Sites A through D, with a total area exceeding 50,000 square meters. In 1926 archaeological excavations were carried out in the central part of Site A in which a distinctive type of Jōmon pottery from the mid-Jōmon period (approximately 5000 years ago) was found. This pottery attracted attention due to its three-dimensional decorative patterns and handles shaped as human faces. Later, it was named "Katsuzaka-style pottery", with the place of its discovery designated as a type site and this type of pottery was found to be distributed widely across the Kantō region and Chubu regions of Japan. In addition, many stone tools, including stone axes and a large edged tools believed to be a type of hoe were found. This indicated the possibility of agricultural activity, and challenged the prevailing orthodoxy that the Jōmon culture was purely a hunter-gatherer culture. The foundations of several pit dwellings were also found.

In 1974 Site D (which contained the settlement ruins) and a portion of Site A received National Historic Site designation. This was extended several times as additional discoveries were made, and as the site came increasingly under threat of urban encroachment. The area is now maintained as Katsuzaka Archaeological Park, with a number of restored pit dwellings and the flagstone foundations for several more on display. A small portion of the excavated artifacts are on display at the park's administrative building. The park is a 20-minute walk from Shimomizo Station on the JR East Sagami Line.

== Gallery ==
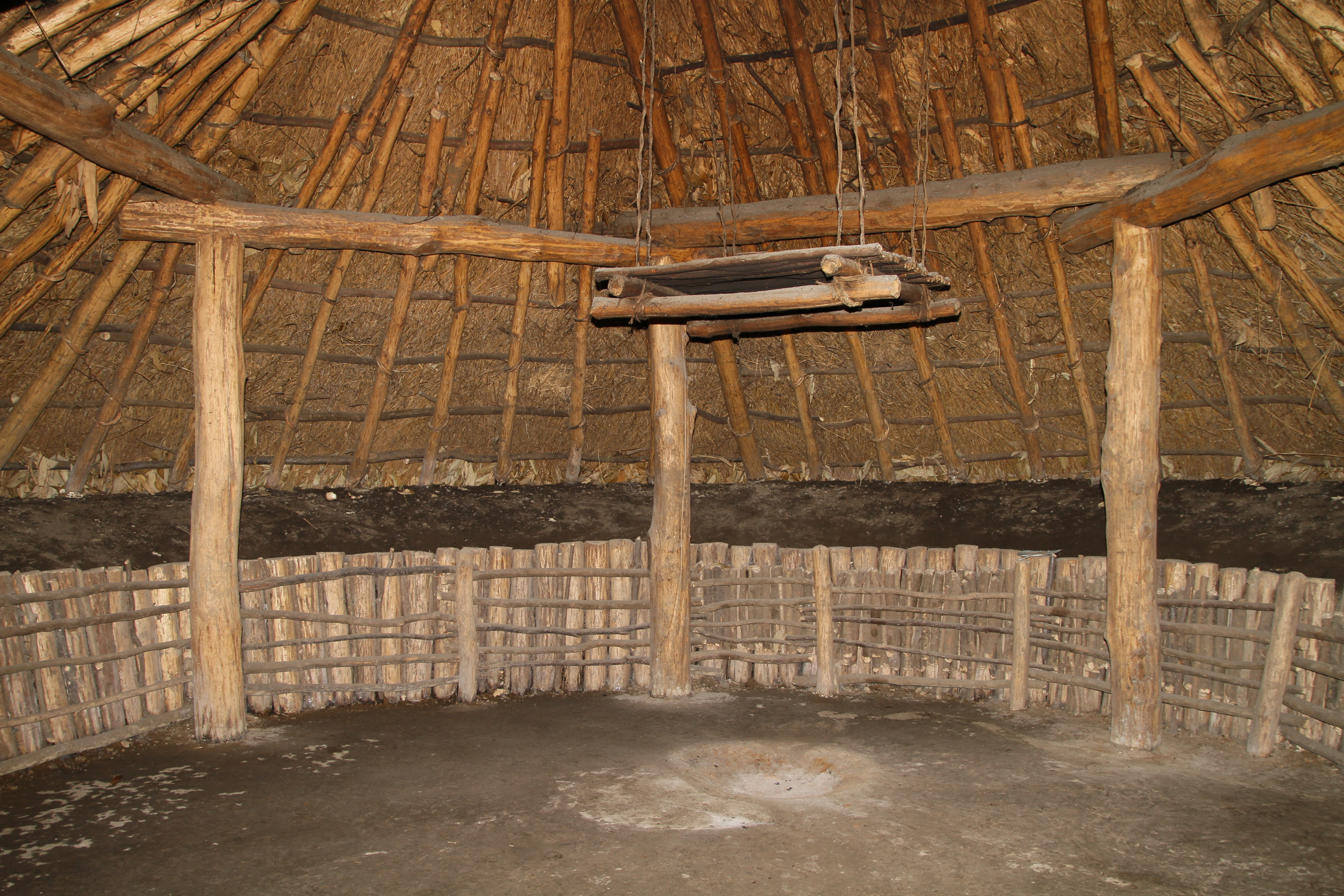
Interior of Reconstructed Pit Dwelling #1

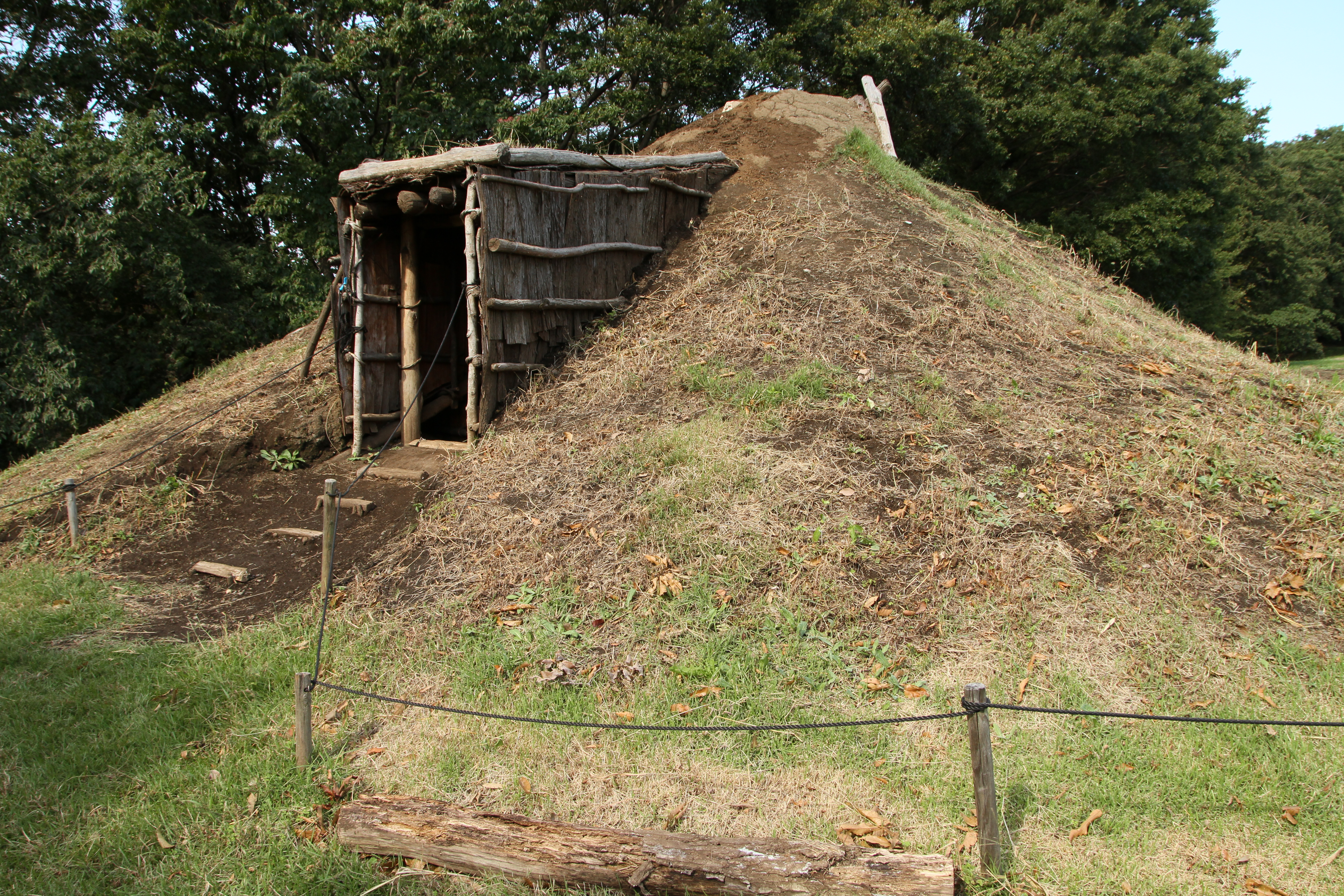
Reconstructed Pit Dwelling #3

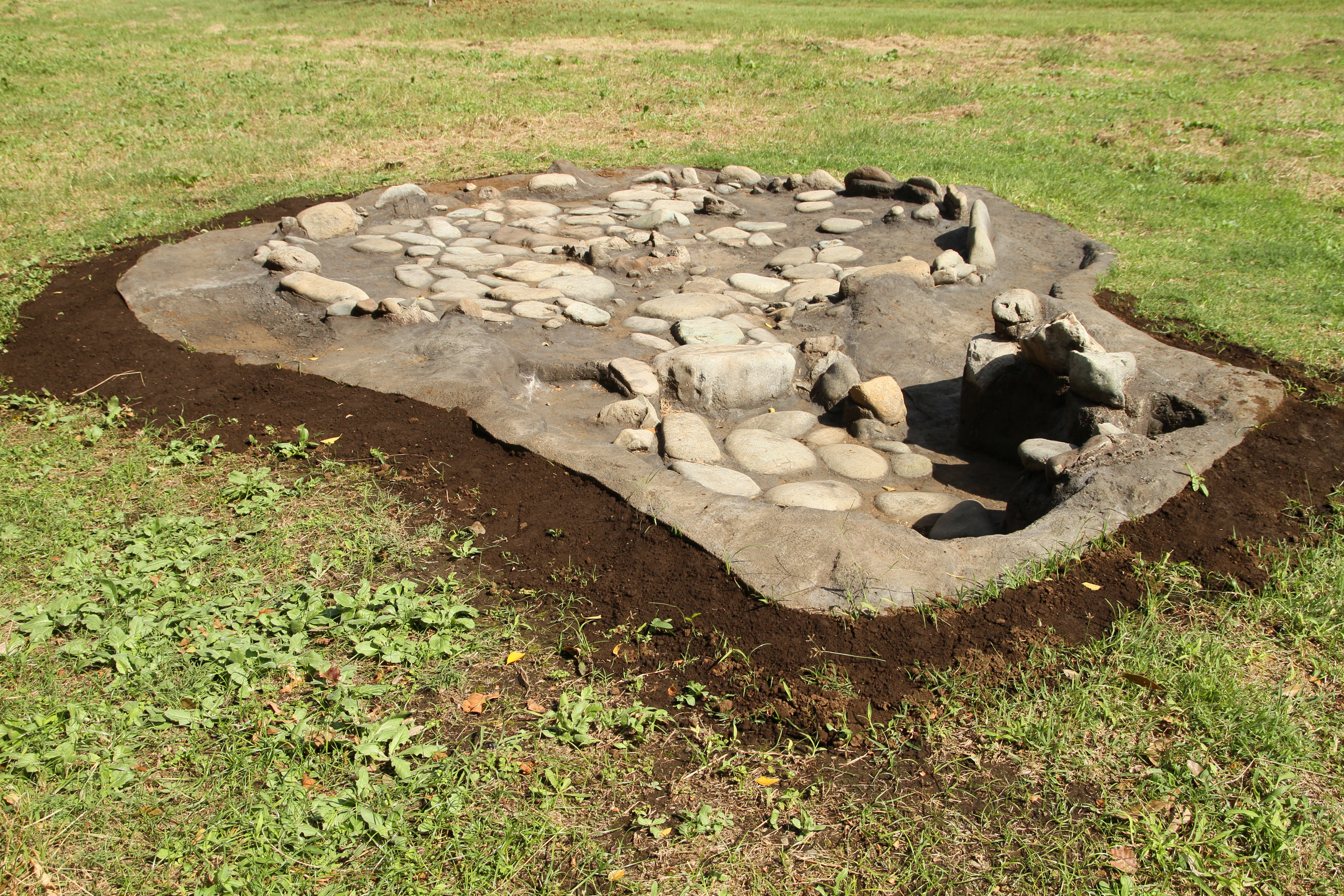
Replica flagstone floor of Pit Dwelling #30

== See also ==
- List of Historic Sites of Japan (Kanagawa)
