= Higashitakane Site =

Yayoi period settlement trace in Kawasaki, Japan

Higashitakane site
- 東高根遺跡 (Japanese)
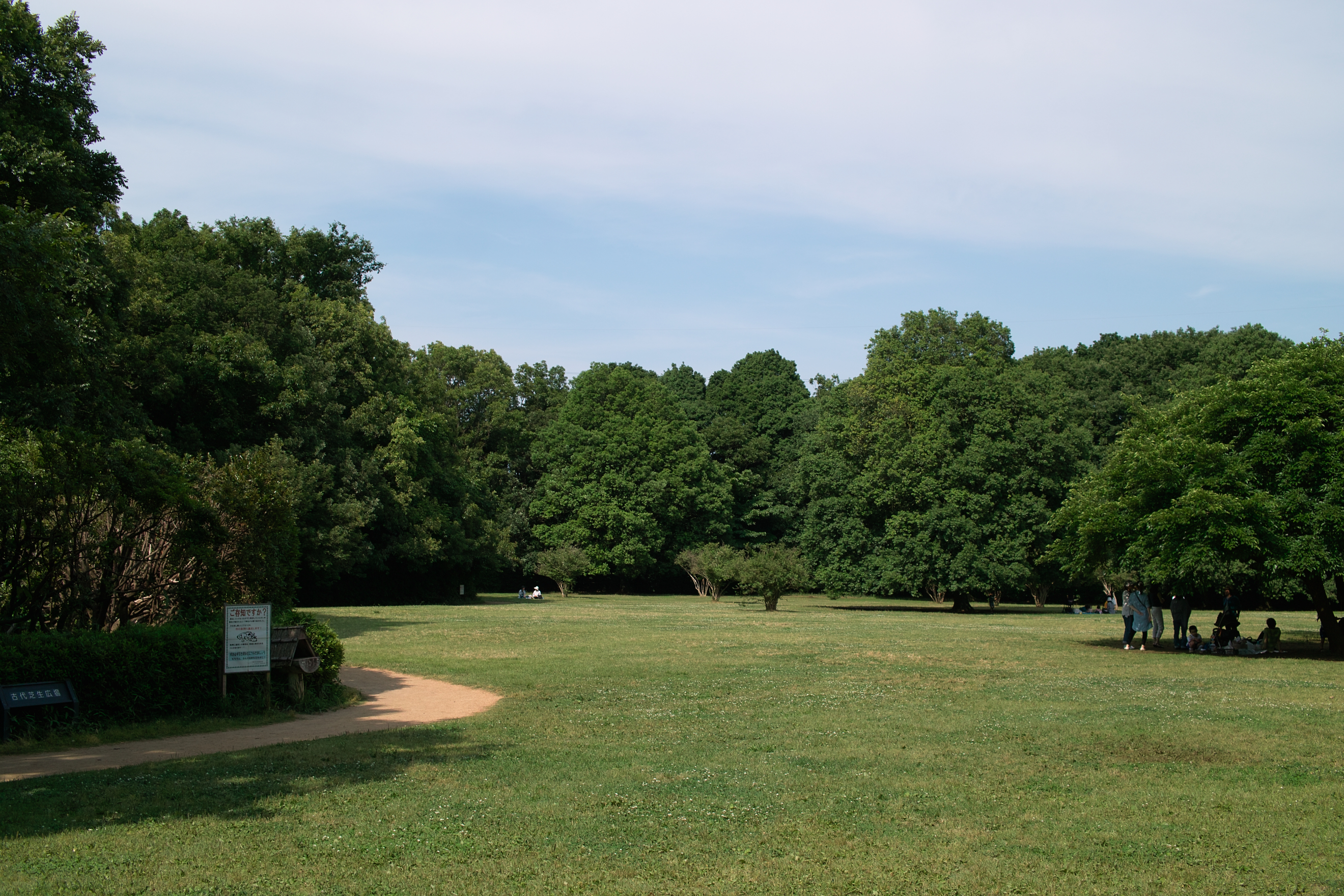
- Higashitakane site

- Higashitakane site Higashitakane Site (Japan)
- Interactive map of Higashitakane site
- 35°36′16″N 139°35′11″E
- Type: Settlement trace
- Periods: Yayoi period
- Location: 2 Kamikimotocho, Miyamae-ku, Kawasaki-shi, Kanagawa-jen
- Region: Kantō region

Site notes
- Public access: Yes (park)
- Kanagawa Prefecture Historic Site

The Higashitakane site (東高根遺跡, Higashitakane iseki) is an archaeological site with the traces of a settlement group existing from the Yayoi to Kofun period, located in Miyamae-ku, Kawasaki, Kanagawa Prefecture in the Kantō region of Japan. It was designated a Kanagawa Prefecture Historic Site in 1971.

== Overview ==
The Higashitakane Site is located on a plateau at the eastern edge of the Tama Hills. Small valleys sharply indent the plateau on three sides below, giving it the appearance of an isolated hill. A spring is also found in the valley to the north. The elevation of the plateau is approximately 55 meters above sea level, and the Hirase River flows eastward 400 meters south of the site. It is adjacent to the Shimoppara site, a settlement site from the late and final Jomon period. To the west is the Nagao Koisaka site, where a Yayoi period large square moat tomb measuring 20 meters on each side has been discovered.

The Higashitakane Site was discovered in 1969, when a large-scale residential development plan for the area including the site began construction. In August 1970, the prefectural and municipal boards of education conducted a preliminary survey which revealed that remains and artifacts of a settlement from the Yayoi through Kofun period were in remarkably good condition. Therefore, Kawasaki City, with subsidies from Kanagawa Prefecture, purchased the land and decided to preserve it in its current state as a park.

The archaeological excavation involved numerous test trenches to cover the entire plateau area to determine the extent of the site. The foundations of 62 pit dwellings were found in these trenches, and extrapolating based on the spacing between trenches and average spacing of the buildings, the total number is estimated to be well over 150 dwellings.However, as the excavation was limited to only the test trenches, and it was decided from the start of the project to preserve the site in situ as much as possible, only a few artifacts (such as Yayoi pottery) were uncovered. Based on the few artifacts that were found, Higashitakane site is judged to have been in use for a long period, from the late Yayoi period (around the 3rd century) to the late Kofun period (around the 8th century). The peak period of the settlement, in particular, appears to have been during the late Yayoi period.

In addition to the archaeological site, the trees flourishing on the slope were found to be Japanese oaks (Quercus myrsinaefolia), a major component of Japanese evergreen broad-leaved forests, whose acorns are known to have been major component of the Yayoi diet.

Currently, the site is maintained and open to the public as Higashitakane Prefectural Forest Park. The site is approximately 1.6 kilometers southwest of Kuji Station on the JR East Nanbu Line.

== See also ==
- List of Historic Sites of Japan (Kanagawa)
