= Kanzaki Site =

Archaeological site in Ayase, Kanagawa, Japan

Kanzaki site
- 神崎遺跡 (Japanese)
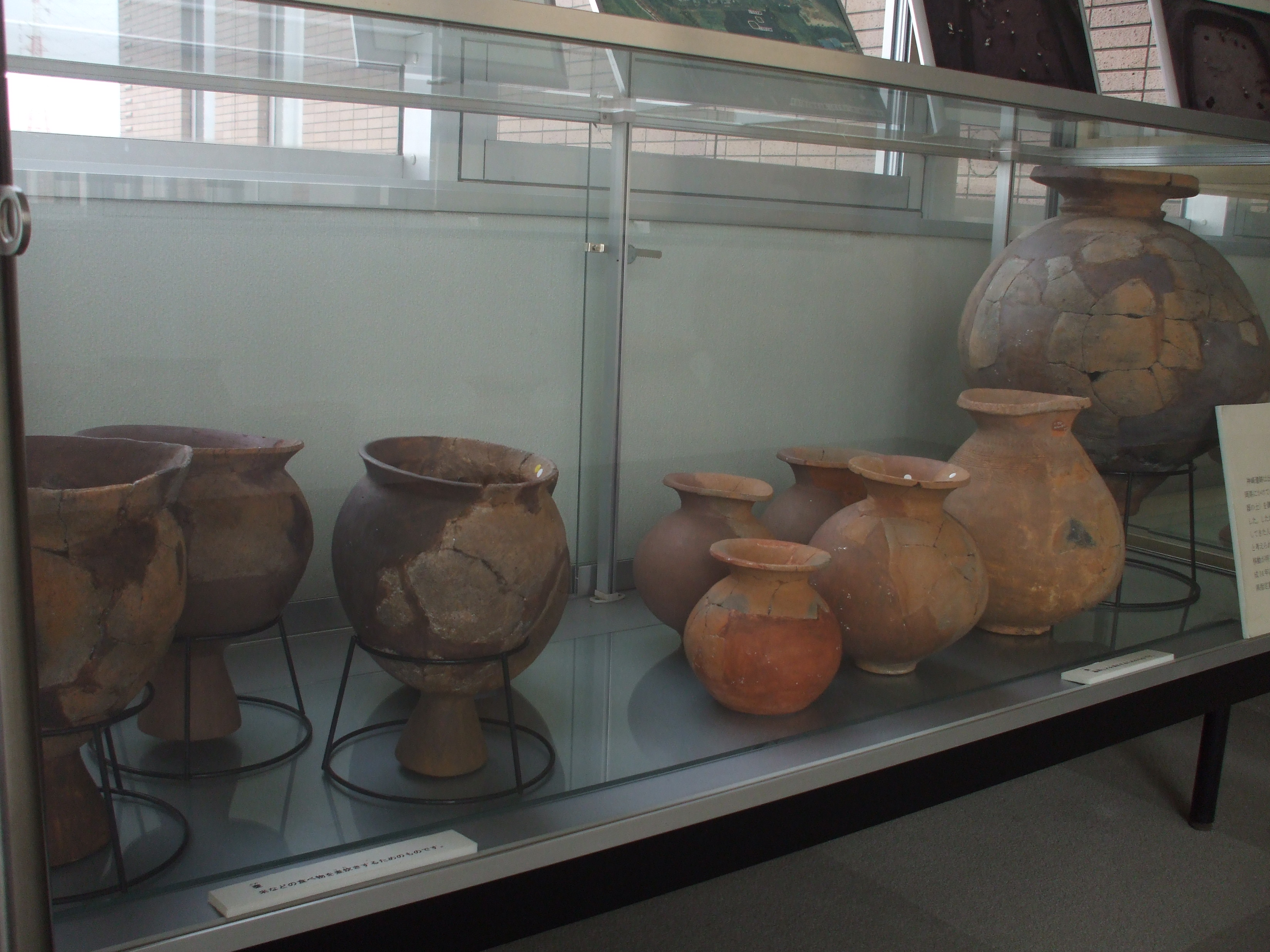
- Yayoi pottery found at the Kanzaki Site

- Kanzaki site Kanzaki Site (Japan)
- 35°24′37″N 139°24′26″E
- Periods: Yayoi period
- Location: Ayase, Kanagawa, Japan
- Region: Kantō region

Site notes
- Public access: Yes (Park, Museum)

The Kanzaki site (神崎遺跡, Kanzaki iseki) is an archaeological site with the ruins of a moated Yayoi period settlement, located in the city of Ayase, Kanagawa Prefecture in the southern Kantō region of Japan. It was designated a National Historic Site of Japan in 2011.

== Overview ==
The Kanzaki Site is located at the tip of a long plateau north and south with an elevation of 24 meters facing the Mekujiri River, a tributary of the Sagami River. The location is at the southwestern tip of Ayase, in central Kanagawa Prefecture, in an area which has been relative free of modern development. In 1987, the city commissioned a study of its prehistory, which included a survey of locations where shards of Yayoi pottery had been found in the past, although no known Yayoi period settlement traces were then known to exist within the city limits. As a result of plotting the location of various finds and a study of the geology of the area, it was determined that this location had the highest probability of a settlement.

An archaeological excavation from July to December 1989 confirmed this hypothesis, when the traces of an oval-shaped moated settlement from the late Yayoi period, measuring 103 meters north-to-south and 65 meters east-to-west was discovered. The moat had a V-shaped cross section with a width and depth of about 1.8 meters, and the foundations of six pit dwellings with elliptical or square layouts were discovered on the north side of the enclosure. The hearths of these dwellings is located on the short axis of the building, a feature found west of the Tōkai region and the excavated Yayoi pottery as well as iron sickles, and copper tools are all characteristic of sites in the western Tōkai region, from the eastern part of Aichi prefecture to the western part of Shizuoka prefecture. In the excavation of 2009, three more pit dwellings were confirmed on the south side of the enclosure, and it is believed that many more buildings once covered the entire area of the site. Although all the excavated pottery has the characteristics of the western Tōkai area, analysis of the clay itself indicates that the pottery was made locally, it is probable that people migrated from the western part of the Tokai region, most likely the Tenryū River valley and the Hanamizu River basin, and brought their traditional designs with them.

The Kanzaki site dates from the first half of the late Yayoi period, or around the 2nd century AD. During this period, the area surrounding the plateau was a swamp or wetland, but no evidence of rice cultivation has yet been discovered. The area was wooded with deciduous broad-leaved trees such as Quercus serrata as well as many varieties of fir trees, and the climate was colder and wetter than at present. During the late Yayoi period, many settlements were built with fortifications, often with multiple moats, indicating a deterioration in the security situation; however, the Kanzaki settlement had only a single moat, and no traces of a rampart or wooden palisade have been discovered. The moat was filled in by natural sedimentation, and there is no indication of backfilling. Furthermore, all of the pottery shards are from the same soil layer, and none of the dwelling sites overlap, indicating that the settlement was abandoned after a relatively short period of occupancy.

Thus far, less than 10% of then site has been excavated, with the remainder preserved in situ in anticipation of future advances in excavation technology and analytical technology. Many of the finds are housed and displayed at the Ayase Kanzaki Site Archaeological Museum (綾瀬市神崎遺跡資料館, Ayase-shi Kanzaki iseki shiryōkan). It is located about 17 minutes by car from Shake Station on the JR East Sagami Line.

== See also ==
- List of Historic Sites of Japan (Kanagawa)
