= Yōkokujiyato Cave Tomb Cluster =

Artificial caves in Ōiso, Japan

Yōkokujiyato Yokoanabo Group
- 楊谷寺谷戸横穴群 (Japanese)
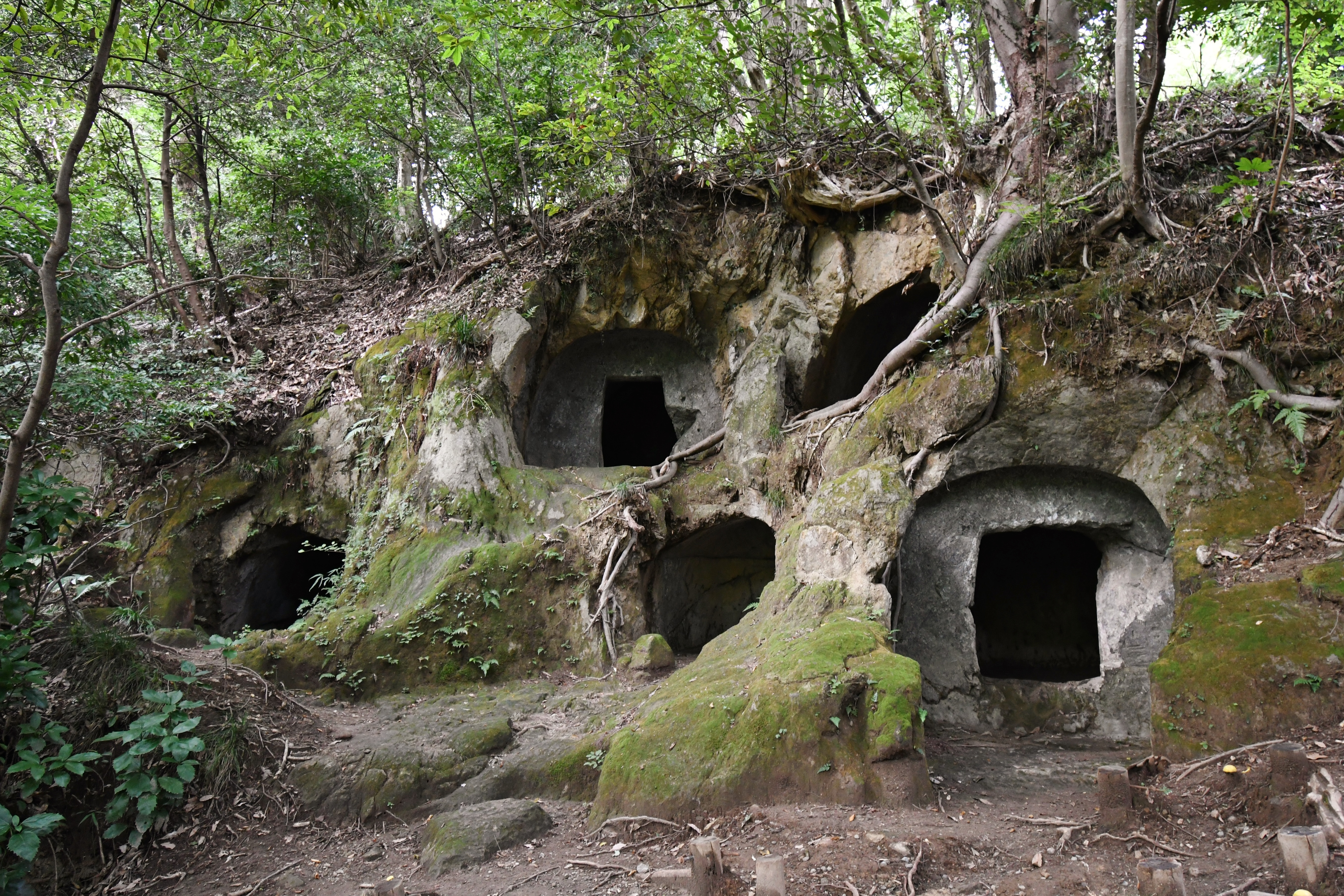
- Yōkokujiyato Yokoanabo Group, upper level

- Yōkokujiyato Yokoanabo Group Yōkokujiyato Cave Tomb Cluster (Japan)
- Interactive map of Yōkokujiyato Yokoanabo Group
- 35°19′10.40″N 139°18′51.63″E
- Type: necropolis
- Periods: Kofun period
- Location: Ōiso, Kanagawa, Japan
- Region: Kanto region

History
- Built: 6th-7th century CE

Site notes
- Owner: Public
- Public access: Yes (park)
- Kanagawa Prefecture Historic Site

The Yōkokujiyato Yokoanabo Group (楊谷寺谷戸横穴群, Yōkokujiyato yokoana-gun) is the name for a cluster of yokoanabo tombs dug in artificial caves in tuff cliffs in the Yōkokujiyato neighborhood of the town of Ōiso, Kanagawa Prefecture, Japan. It was designated as a Kanagawa Prefectural Historic Site in 1966.

== Overview ==
In the latter half of the Kofun period, the class of people buried expanded to include wealthy farmers and other commoners, and mass cemeteries in which side holes were dug into the slope of a hill to provide a burial chamber began to replace burial mounds. Such cemeteries could contain dozens to hundreds of tombs, with each tomb containing multiple burials.

The Yōkokujiyato yokoanabo cluster is located on the southern slope of a hill in a tributary valley of Kōraiyama, in the eastern part of the Ōiso Hills, known as one of the most densely populated areas of cave tombs in Japan. To date, 605 late Kofun period yokoanabo have been confirmed in the hills of Ōiso. Considering many have been destroyed over the centuries, and many others are buried and undiscovered, it is estimated that over 1,000 tombs exist in Ōiso. The Yōkokujiyato consists of 27 tombs have been identified across four levels (seven are buried by soil inflow). Archaeological excavations were conducted in 1879 and 1962. The tombs come in a variety of shapes. These include arch-shaped, dome-shaped, half-arch/dome shapes, and house-shaped (gable roof) tombs. Because this valley has been used as a burial ground for approximately 100 years, the design is believed to have evolved over time. Because all tombs have been looted, little is known about them except for fragmentary grave goods.

	Entry	Burial Chamber
11号		
5号		
4号		
7号		

The site is approximately 1.1 kilometers north-northeast of Ōiso Station on the JR East Tōkaidō Main Line.

== See also ==
- List of Historic Sites of Japan (Kanagawa)
