= Hayakawa Castle =

Castle ruins in Ayase, Kanagawa, Japan

- 早川城
- Ayase, Kanagawa Japan
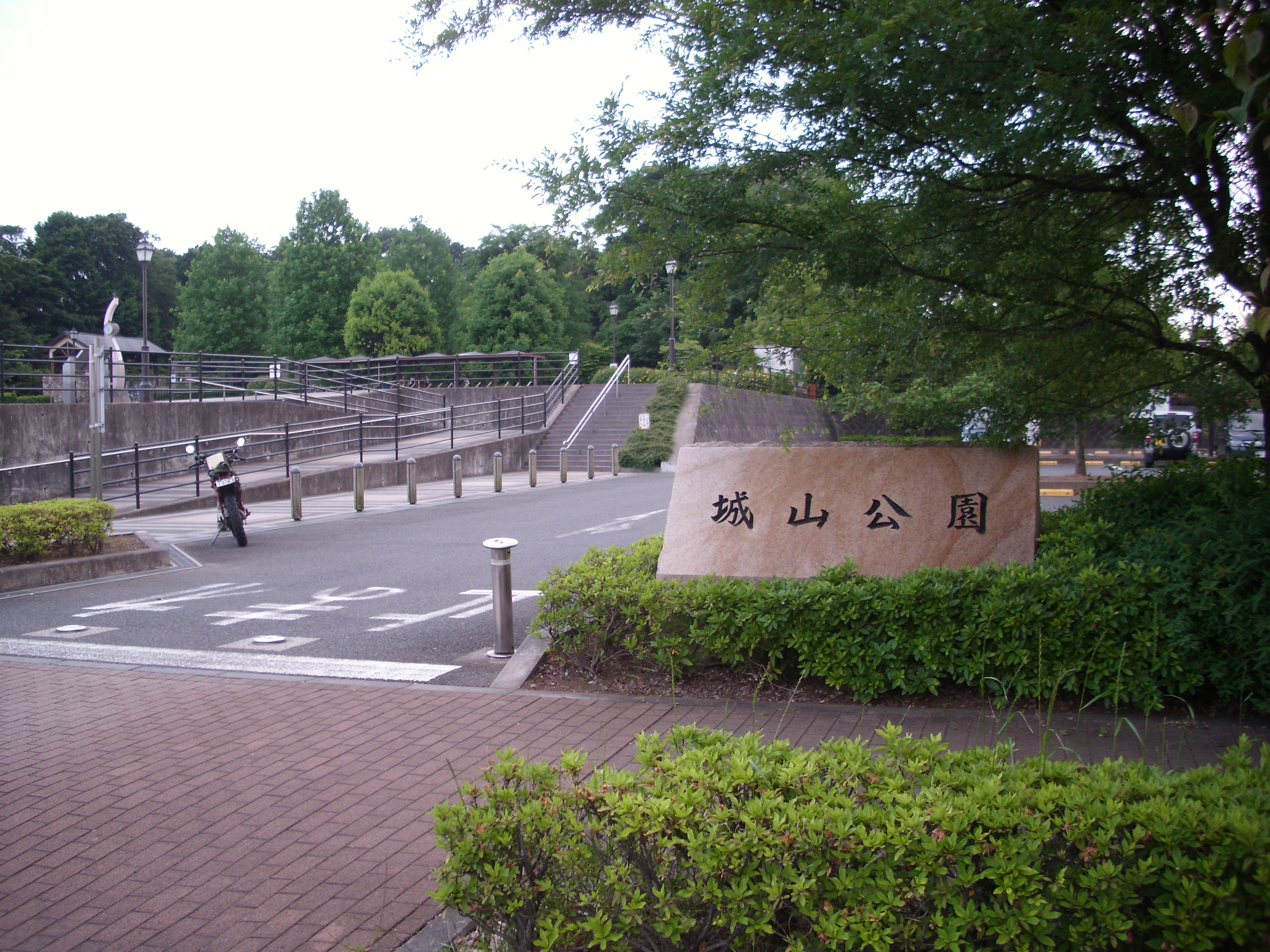
- Shiroyama Park in Ayase

Site information
- Type: yamajiro-style Japanese castle
- Controlled by: Shibuya clan
- Open to the public: yes
- Condition: Archaeological and designated prefectural historical site; castle ruins

Location
- Location within Kanagawa Prefecture Location within Japan
- Coordinates: 35°26′14.3″N 139°25′10.4″E

Site history
- Built by: c.Shibuya Shigekuni
- In use: Kamakura - Sengoku period
- Kanagawa Prefecture Historic Site

Hayakawa Castle (早川城, Hayakawa-jō) is a Kamakura period Japanese castle located in what is now the Hayakawa-Shiroyama neighborhood of the city of Ayase, Kanagawa Prefecture, Japan. Its ruins have been protected as a Kanagawa Prefectural Historic Site since 2008.

== Overview ==
Hayakawa Castle is situated on the southern end of a tongue-shaped plateau on the left bank of the Mekujiri River, a tributary of the Sagami River, approximately 700 meters west of Ayase City Hall. It is said to have been built by Shibuya Shigekuni, a samurai of the late Heian to early Kamakura period, but historical records are scarce, and its actual construction remains unclear. Six archaeological excavations were conducted between 1989 and 1994. The excavations unearthed remains such as baileys, moats, earthworks, lookout mounds, pits (postholes), and ditches, as well as artifacts such as earthenware and fire pits. While the construction date would be the 12th century according to tradition, the aforementioned excavations only confirmed use from the 14th to 15th centuries.

In the late Heian period, the Shibuya clan was a powerful samurai family that controlled a shōen landed estate called Shibuya-shō (or "Yoshida-shō"), centered around the area of present-day Ayase. According to the Azuma Kagami, Shibuya Shigekuni protected Sasaki Hideyoshi, a senior retainer of the Minamoto clan who fled to Ōshū after being defeated in the Heiji Rebellion (1159). After the establishment of the Kamakura shogunate, he became a retainer of Minamoto no Yoritomo and was succeeded by his son Shibuya Takashige, who also went by the name of "Hayakawa Takashige". However, in the 1213 Wada Rebellion, Takashige sided with Wada Yoshimori, which resulted in many deaths and a demotion in the clan's status. Nevertheless, in 1247, after the Hōji Rebellion, he was granted estates in Satsuma Province and may have relocated there. It is believed that a branch of the Shibuta clan continued to control the Ayase area from their stronghold at Hayakawa until the Muromachi period, and another branch ruled an area of Musashi Province (now the area of Shibuya in Tokyo) until 1524.

During the Sengoku period, Hayakawa Castle was renovated as a fortification of the Odawara Hōjō clan, and after Tokugawa Ieyasu's entry into the Kantō region, it became the stronghold of Ishikawa Shigehisa. Currently, the castle site is maintained as "Hayakawa Castle Mountain Park," where remnants of dry moats and earthworks can be seen. Furthermore, in honor of Admiral Tōgō Heihachirō, who was active in the Meiji era and who claimed to be a descendant of the Shibuya clan, a stone monument inscribed "Hayakawa Castle Site, the birthplace of Admiral Tōgō's ancestors" stands in the park.

== See also ==
- List of Historic Sites of Japan (Kanagawa)

== Literature ==
- De Lange, William (2021). An Encyclopedia of Japanese Castles. Groningen: Toyo Press. pp. 600 pages. ISBN 978-9492722300.
