= Isshōmasu Site =

Archaeological site in Kamakura, Japan

Coordinates: 35°18′53″N 139°31′39″E

Location

Isshōmasu Site (Japanese: 一升桝遺跡) is an archaeological site that is located in Kamakura, Kanagawa Prefecture. The site was designated a National Historic Site of Japan in 2007. It is a Kamakura period earthworks beside the road, half a kilometre from Gokuraku-ji.

== See also ==
- List of Historic Sites of Japan (Kanagawa)
