= Mount Ishigaki =

Mountain in Odawara, Kanagawa Prefecture, Japan

Coordinates: 35°14′06.1″N 139°07′37.3″E

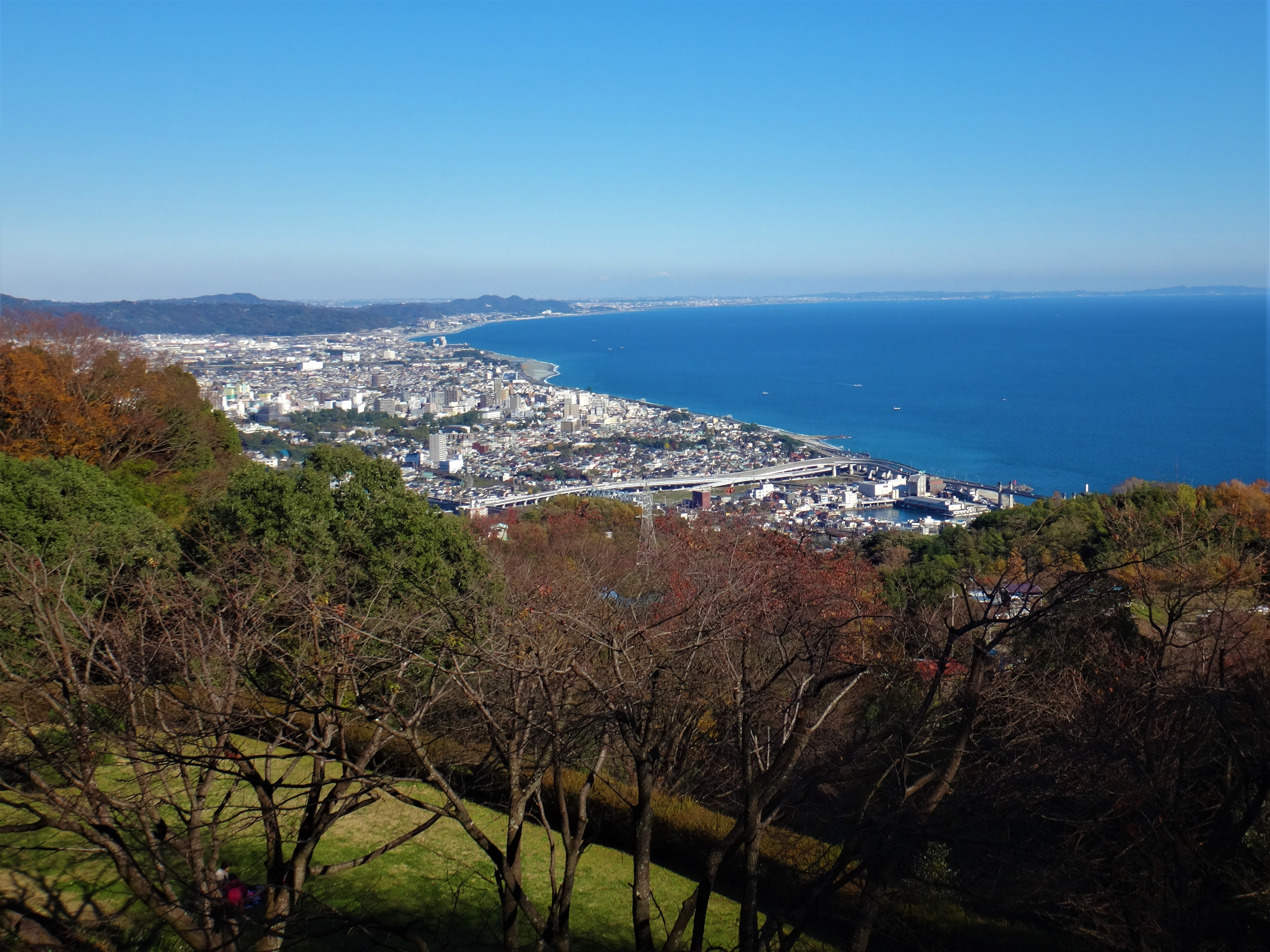
View of Odawara and Sagami Bay from Mount Ishigaki

Mount Ishigaki (Japanese: 石垣山) is a mountain located in Odawara, Kanagawa Prefecture. The altitude is 241 meters. It was designated as a national historic site in 1959.

== See also ==
- Ishigakiyama Ichiya Castle
