= Hidden village =

Remote settlement in Feudal Japan

A hidden village (隠れ里, Kakurezato) was a remote settlement in Japan during its Feudal Period. Often characterized by their inaccessibility and ease of defense, tradition holds that these villages were the dwelling place of the ninja. An example of the location of one of these villages can be found in Kamakura, Kanagawa near Sasuke Inari Shrine.

== Summary ==
There are stories of hunters wandering into the deep mountains, arriving by chance, hearing weaving and rice making in the mountains, and chopsticks and bowls flowing from the top of the river. The residents live peaceful lives without conflict, and the climate is warm, and visitors from outside spend pleasant days with kind hospitality, but even if they try to visit again, they will never be able to visit again. In the background of such tradition, the existence of a village where Heike's fallen people are said to have lived in hiding, and there are villages that are actually said to be heike valleys and heike hideaways. In addition, it can be inferred that the simple mountain worship and the idea of the utopia before the introduction of Buddhist Pure Land thought are influenced. The hidden village is a separate land that is imagined to be deep in the mountains, in the mound hole, and in the far upper stream of the river, and at the bottom of the abyss. It is said that it is a Hinden Hyakushomura, but the hidden village is a peaceful world without any sorrow, and there is a flow at times different from the human world. Ordinary people cannot go there, but good people sometimes have a chance to get a glimpse of the world. In any case, Eiko Arima, a member of the National Society of Japan, said that the people's desire for a utopia was put in place.

== In popular culture ==
The villages inhabited and run by ninja in the manga and anime series Naruto are known as hidden villages. Most of the main characters come from Konohagakure no sato (木ノ葉隠れの里, literally: village hidden by tree leaves).
