= Ryūkō-ji =

Ryūkō-ji is the name of numerous Buddhist temples in Japan. Below is an incomplete list:

- Ryūkō-ji (Uwajima) (龍光寺) in Uwajima, Ehime Prefecture. It is temple No. 41 in the Shikoku Pilgrimage.
- Ryūkō-ji (Fujisawa) (龍口寺) in Fujisawa, Kanagawa Prefecture.
