= Ima Kōji =

Street in Japan

Coordinates: 35°19′21.71″N 139°33′1.73″E

Ima Kōji (今小路), sometimes also called Ima Ōji (今大路) is the name of a section of a longer street in Kamakura, Kanagawa, Japan. Strictly speaking, Ima Kōji goes from Katsu no Hashi Bridge (勝ノ橋) in front of Jufuku-ji to Tatsumi Jinja Shrine (巽神社) about 400 m further south, but the name is used all the way to the intersection with Yuigahama Avenue. Although certainly old enough, historical documents written at the time of the Kamakura shogunate like the Azuma Kagami do not mention it.
