= Sasuke Inari Shrine =

Shinto shrine in Kamakura, Japan

Sasuke Inari Shrine (佐助稲荷神社, Sasuke Inari Jinja)
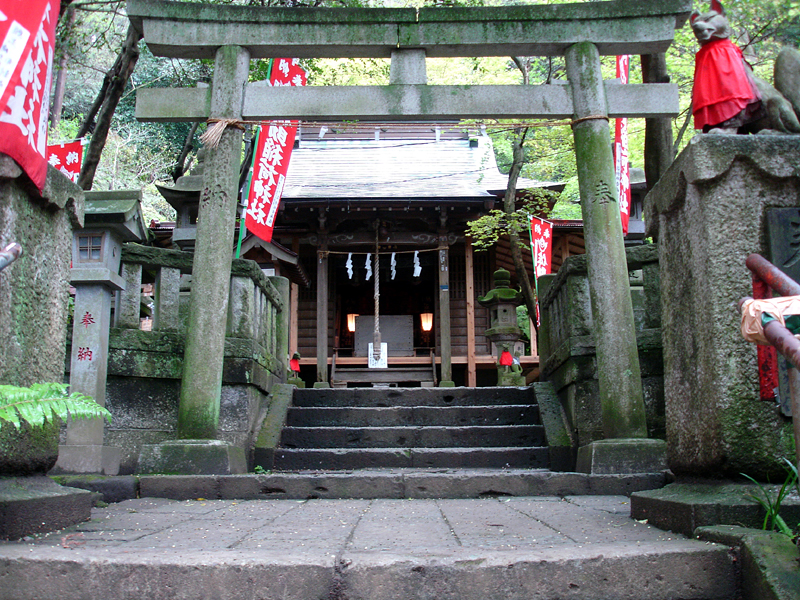
- Sasuke Inari Shrine

- Location within Japan

Religion
- Affiliation: Shinto

Location
- Location: Kanagawa Kamakura
- Interactive map of Sasuke Inari Shrine (佐助稲荷神社, Sasuke Inari Jinja)
- Coordinates: 35°19′27.88″N 139°32′20.01″E

Architecture
- Founder: Meiji Emperor

Sasuke Inari Shrine (佐助稲荷神社, Sasuke Inari Jinja) is a Shinto shrine in Kamakura and the site of the Hidden Village of Kamakura. It is located very near the Zeniarai Benzaiten Ugafuku Shrine.

== History ==
Tradition holds that Sasuke Inari Shrine was created by Minamoto no Yoritomo. While in exile in Izu, Yoritomo was visited in a dream by an old man from the Hidden Village of Kamakura who instructed Yoritomo of the timing to begin battling his enemies. When Yoritomo succeeded and became shōgun, he created this shrine in gratitude. An alternative to this story has an Inari Fox messenger appearing in Yoritomo's dream.

According to Kamakura Historian Shimizu Ginzō, the hidden village that was adjacent to the shrine was the dwelling of a band of people that were the antecedents to the Ninja. The remoteness and easy defensibility provided the necessary seclusion to conduct their activities which included elimination of enemies of the Kamakura shogunate.

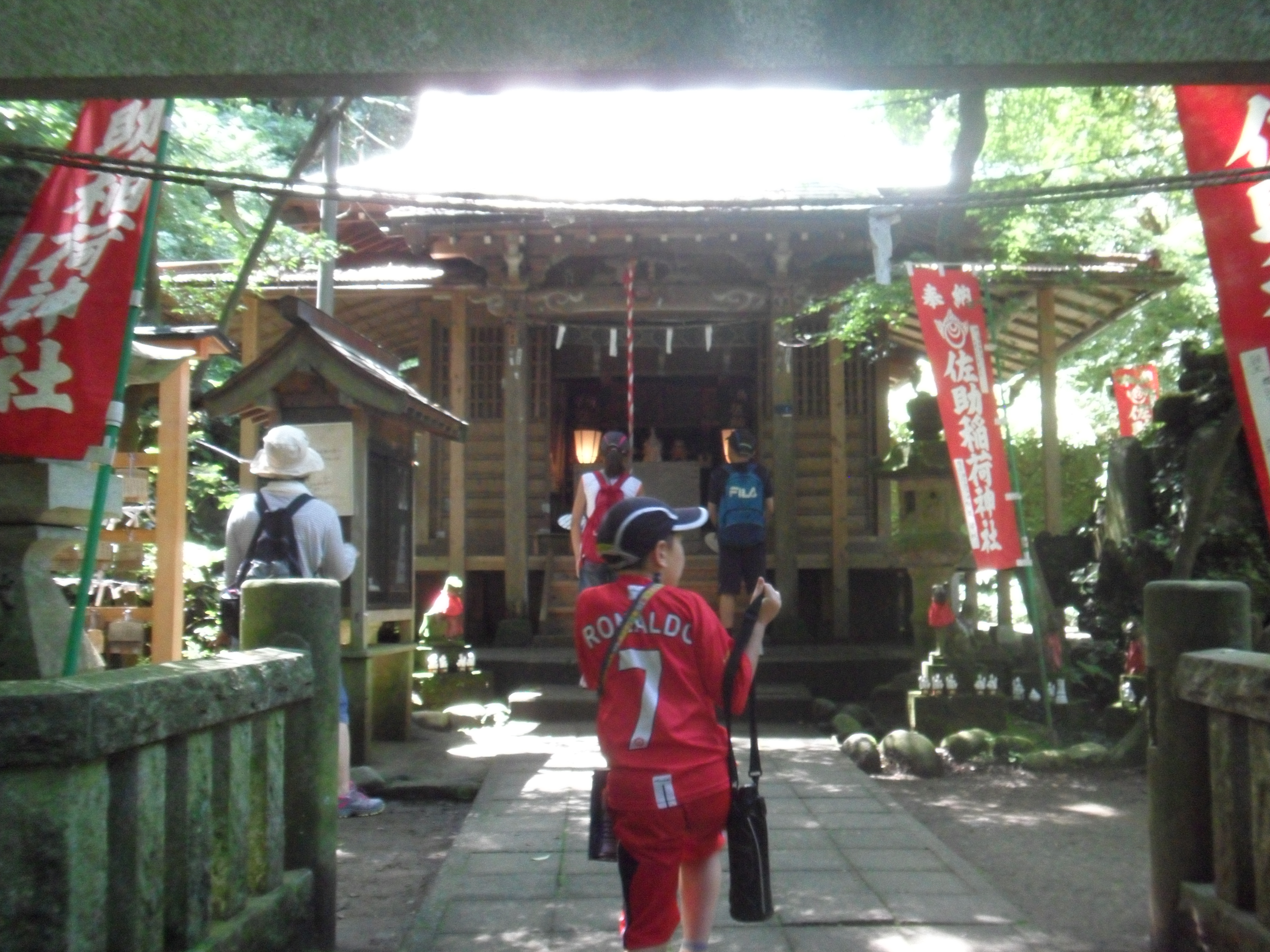
Main Shrine Building

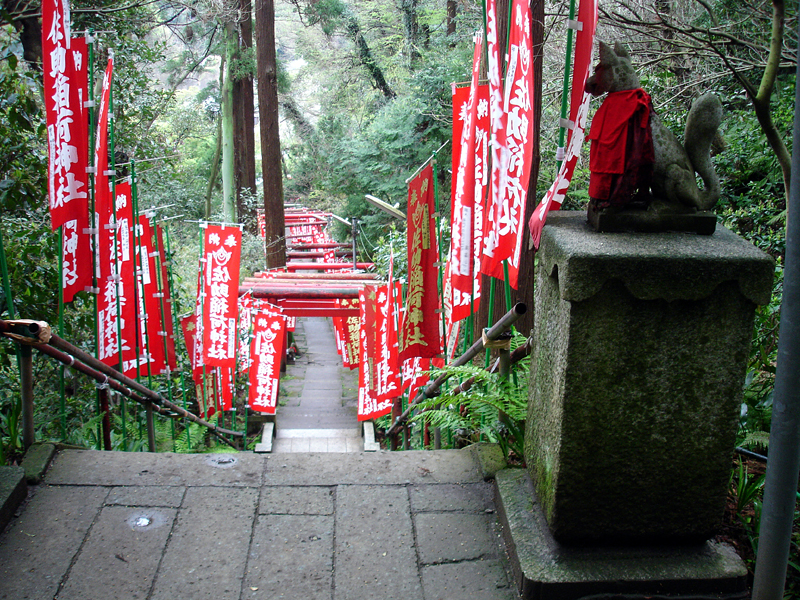
Stairs down from the main shrine area

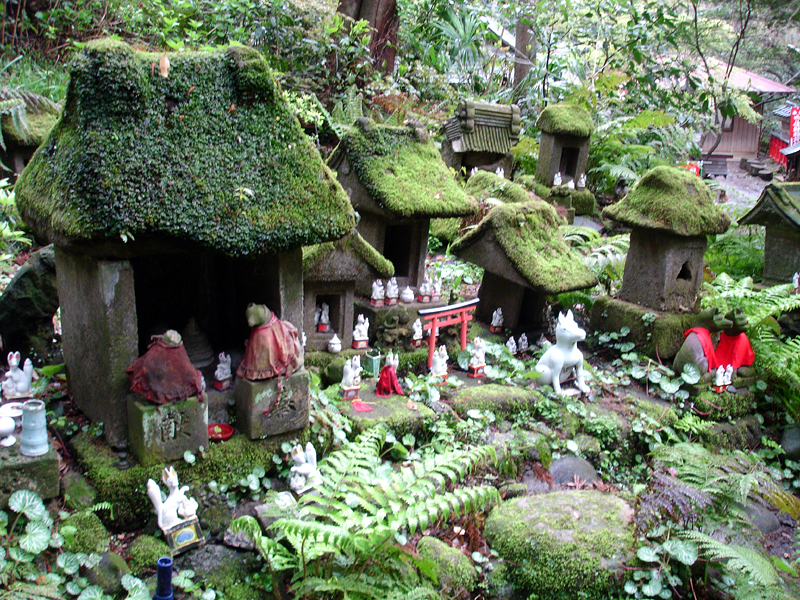
Small Inari statues and moss covered miniature shrines

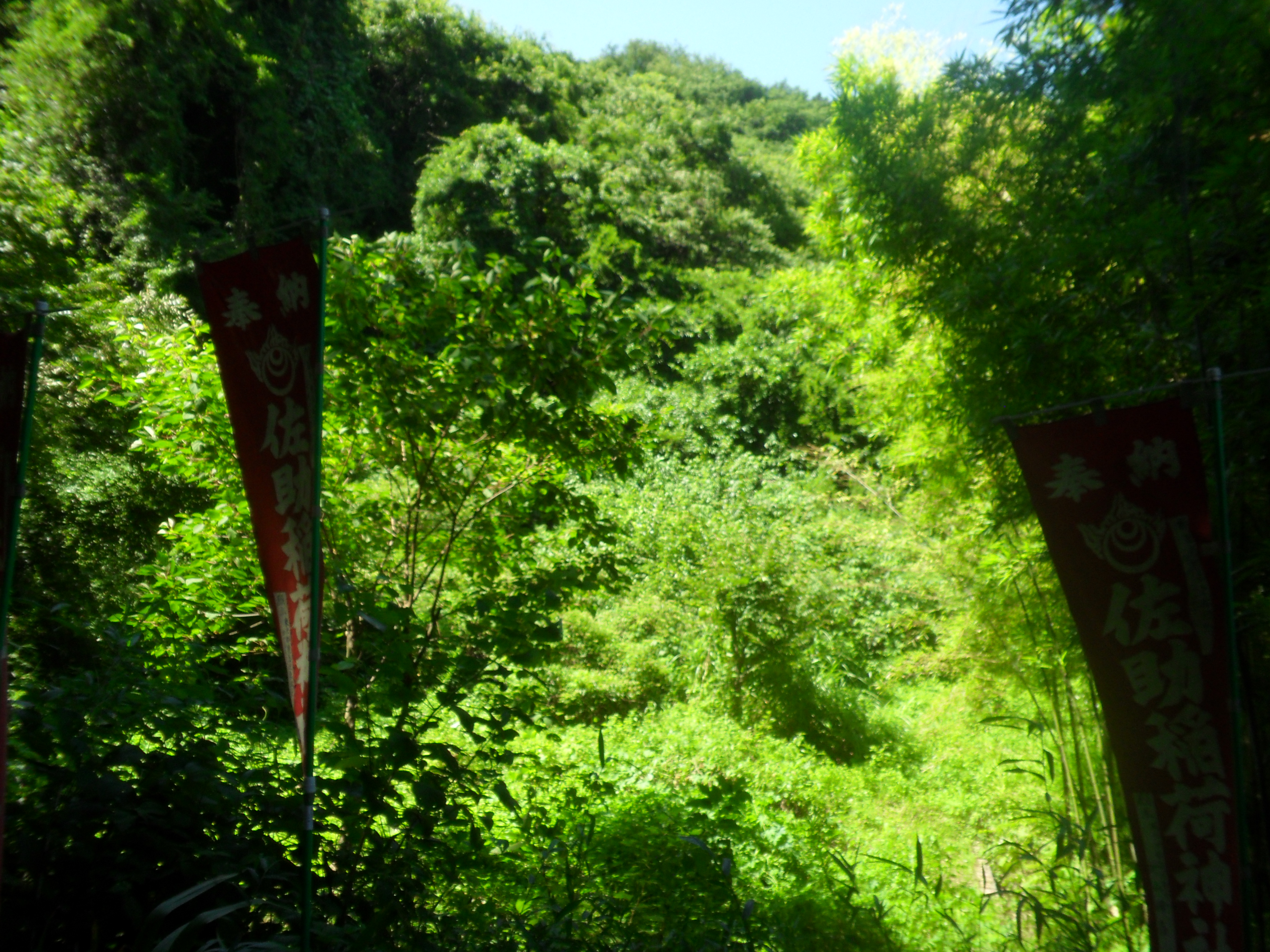
View of the so-called hidden village site

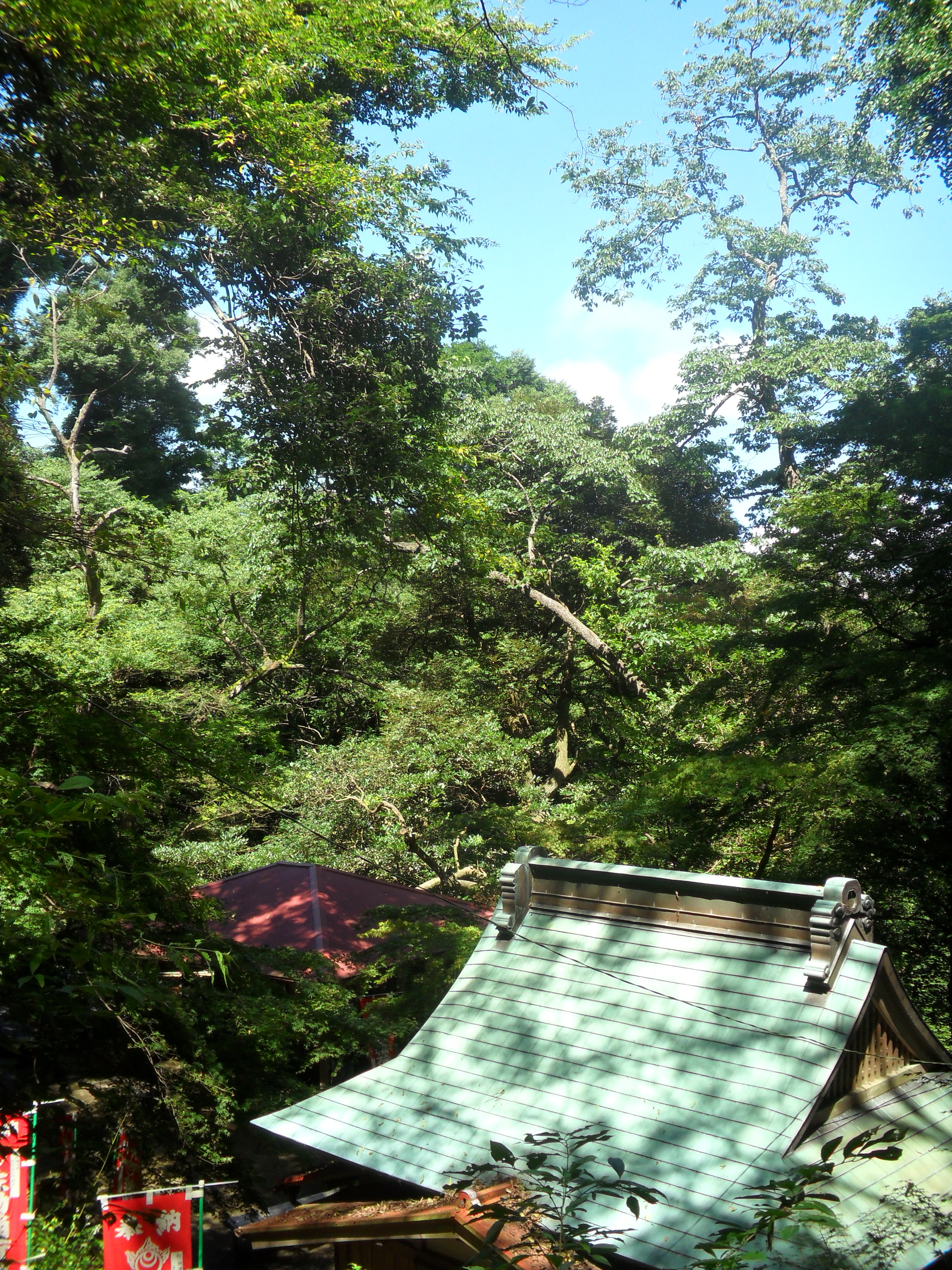
Overlooking the main shrine to the so-called hidden village site

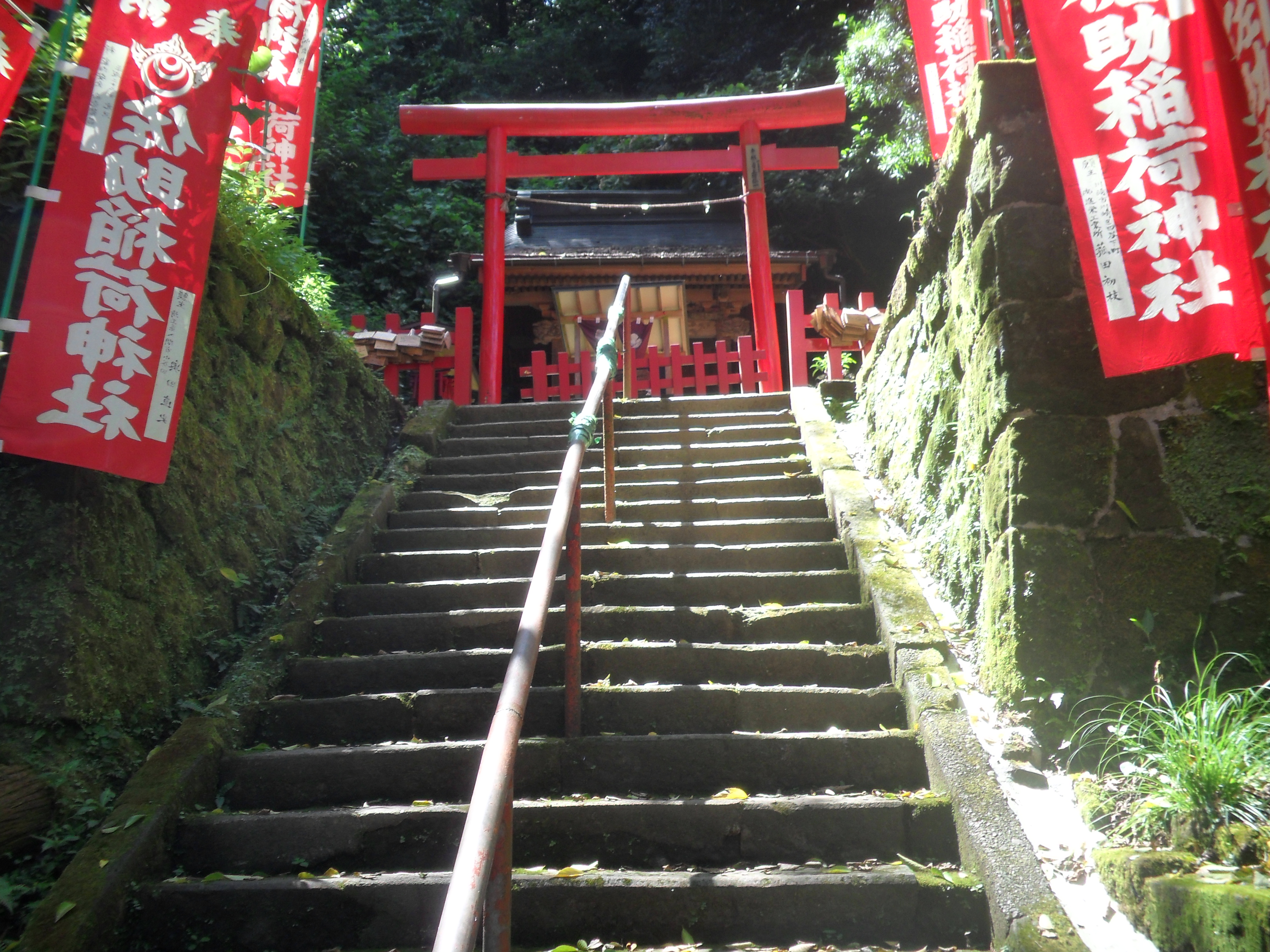
Upper shrine

== In popular culture ==
- The Sasuke Inari Shine is a key real world location used in the 2004 Anime Elfen Lied.
