= Ryūkō-ji (Fujisawa) =

Buddhist temple in Kanagawa Prefecture, Japan

Coordinates: 35°18′42.17″N 139°29′21.69″E

Jakkō-zan Ryūkō-ji 寂光山龍口寺
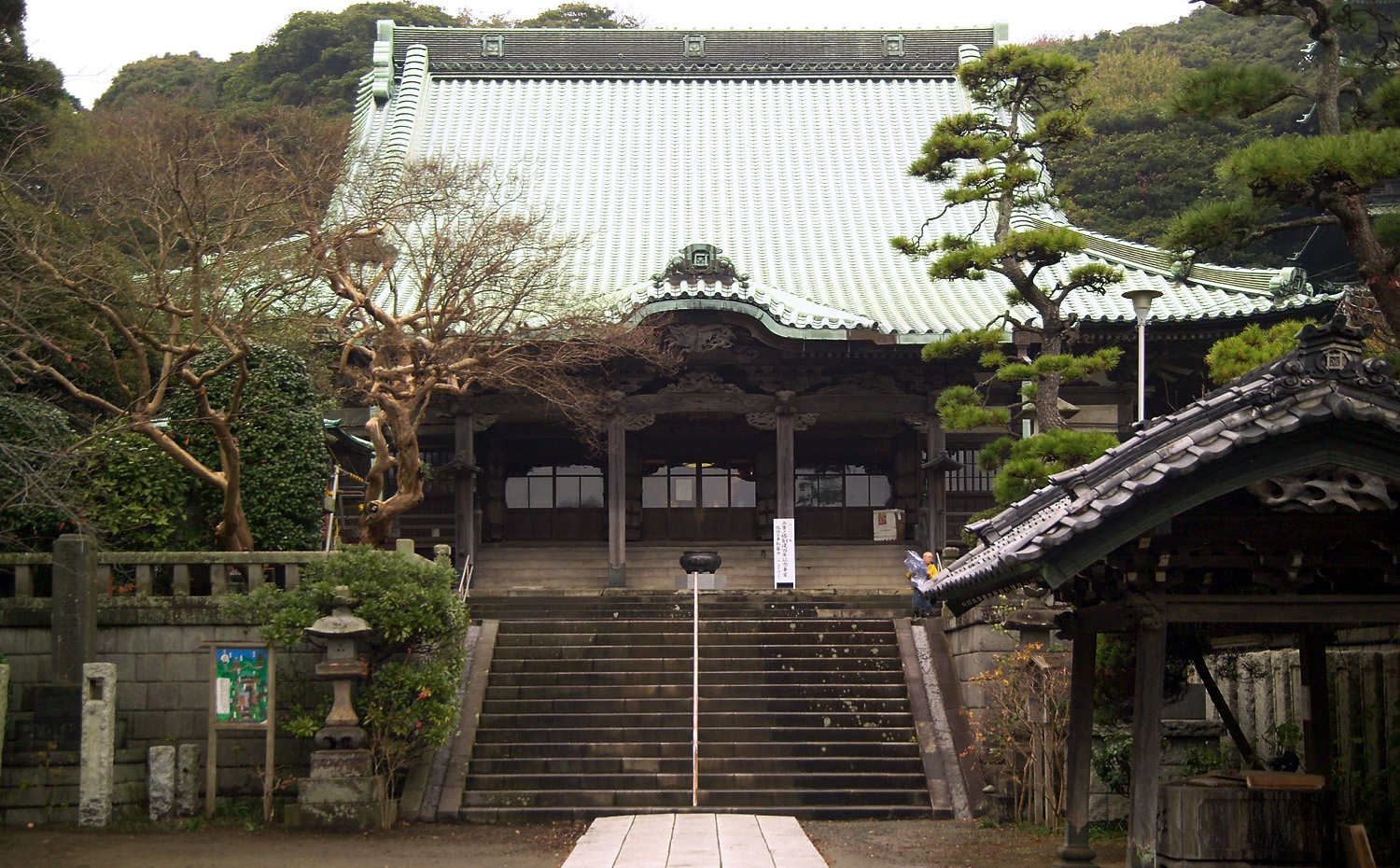
- The hondō (main hall)

Religion
- Affiliation: Nichiren Buddhism

Location
- Location: 3-13-37 Katase, Fujisawa, Kanagawa Prefecture
- Country: Japan
- Interactive map of Jakkō-zan Ryūkō-ji 寂光山龍口寺

Architecture
- Founder: Nippō
- Completed: 1337

Ryūkō-ji (龍口寺) is a temple of the Nichiren Shū in the city of Fujisawa, Kanagawa Prefecture, Japan. It stands on the site of the former Tatsukuchi (or Tatsunokuchi) Execution Grounds, and its name uses the same two kanji meaning "dragon mouth" (龍口). It was here that Nichiren, namesake of the Buddhist sect, was to have been executed, but was spared. It was founded in 1337 by Nippō, a disciple of Nichiren.

Major buildings at the temple include a hondō (main hall), a five-story pagoda, a stupa (sharitō), and the Shichimendō. The cave where Nichiren was confined is preserved on the grounds. A statue of him stands in the courtyard in front of the hondō.

Ryūkō-ji is a short walk from Enoshima Station on the Enoshima Electric Railway, and from Shōnan-Enoshima Station on the Shonan Monorail.

== On the grounds ==
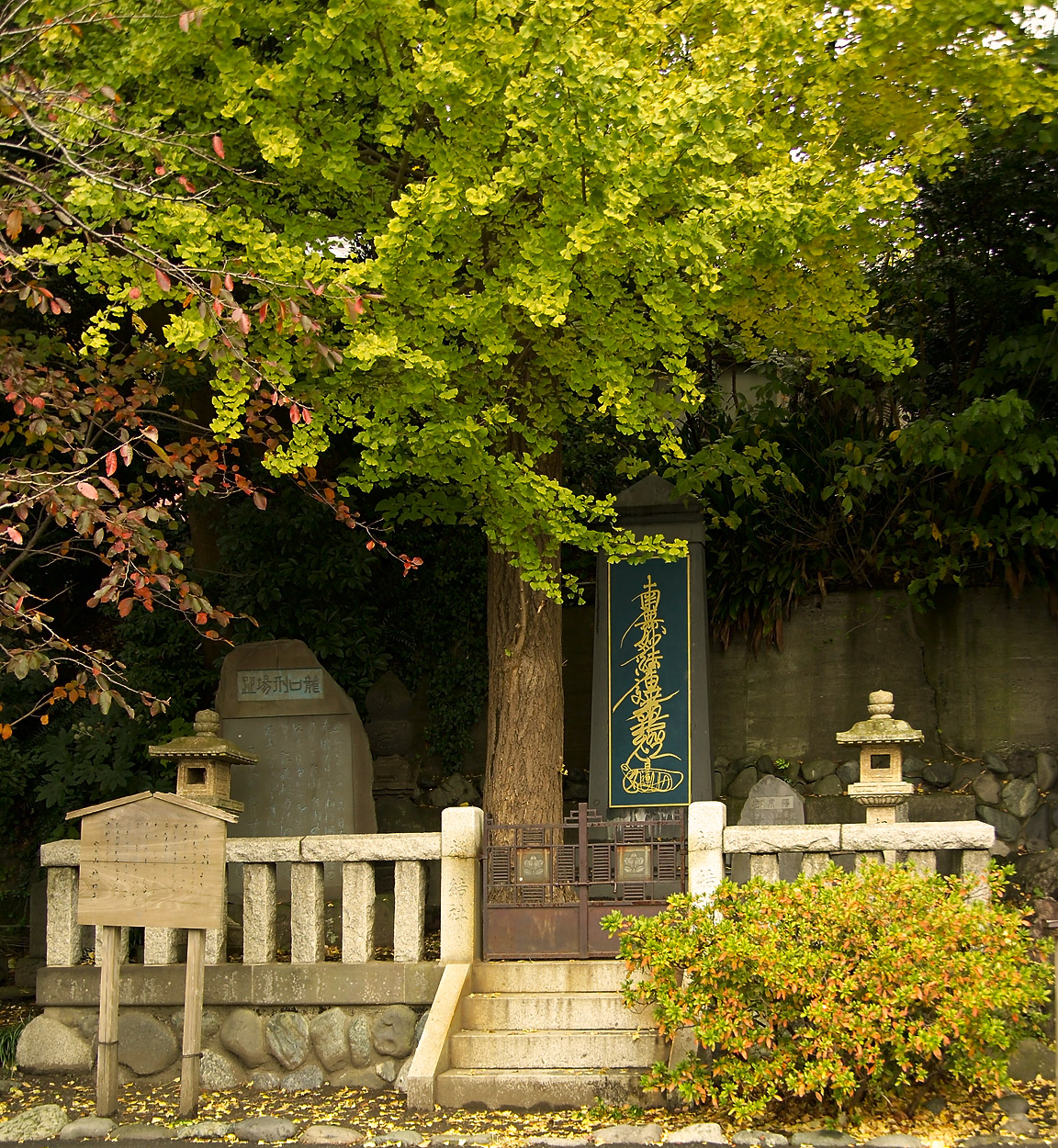
Marker at site of execution grounds

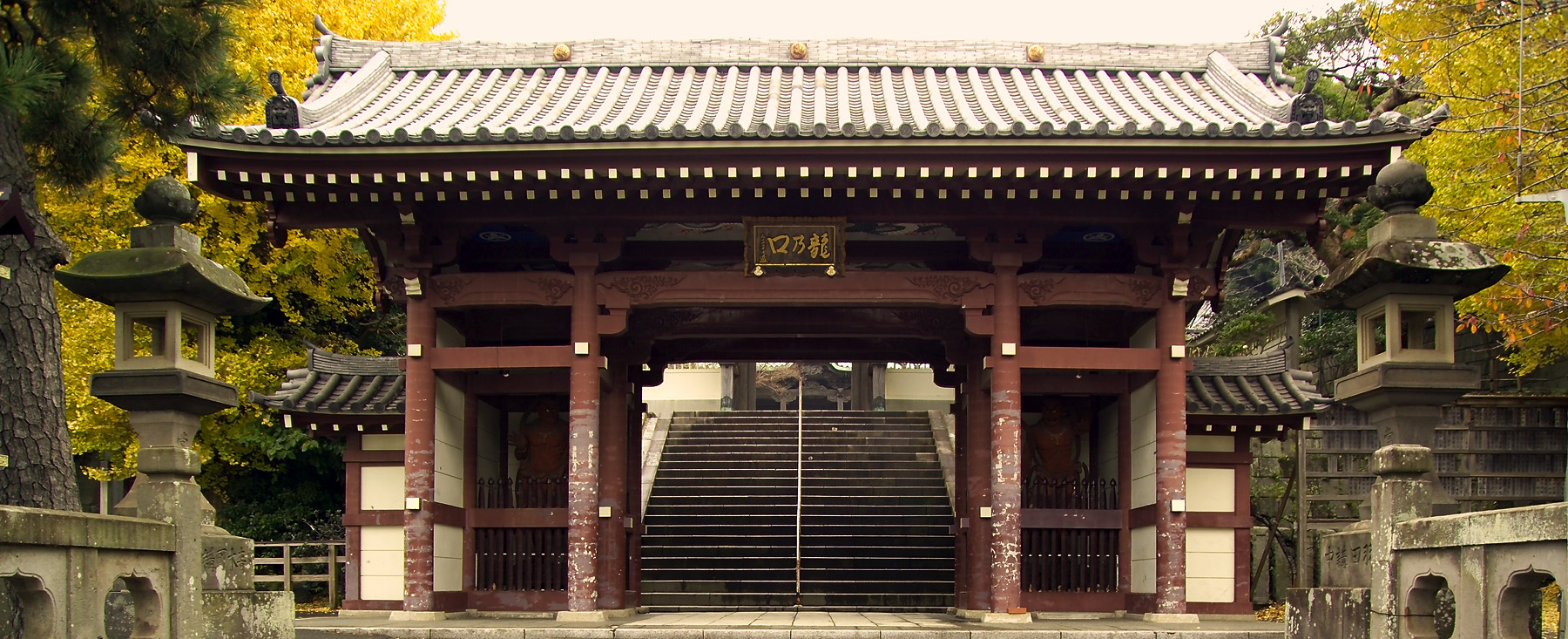
Outer gate

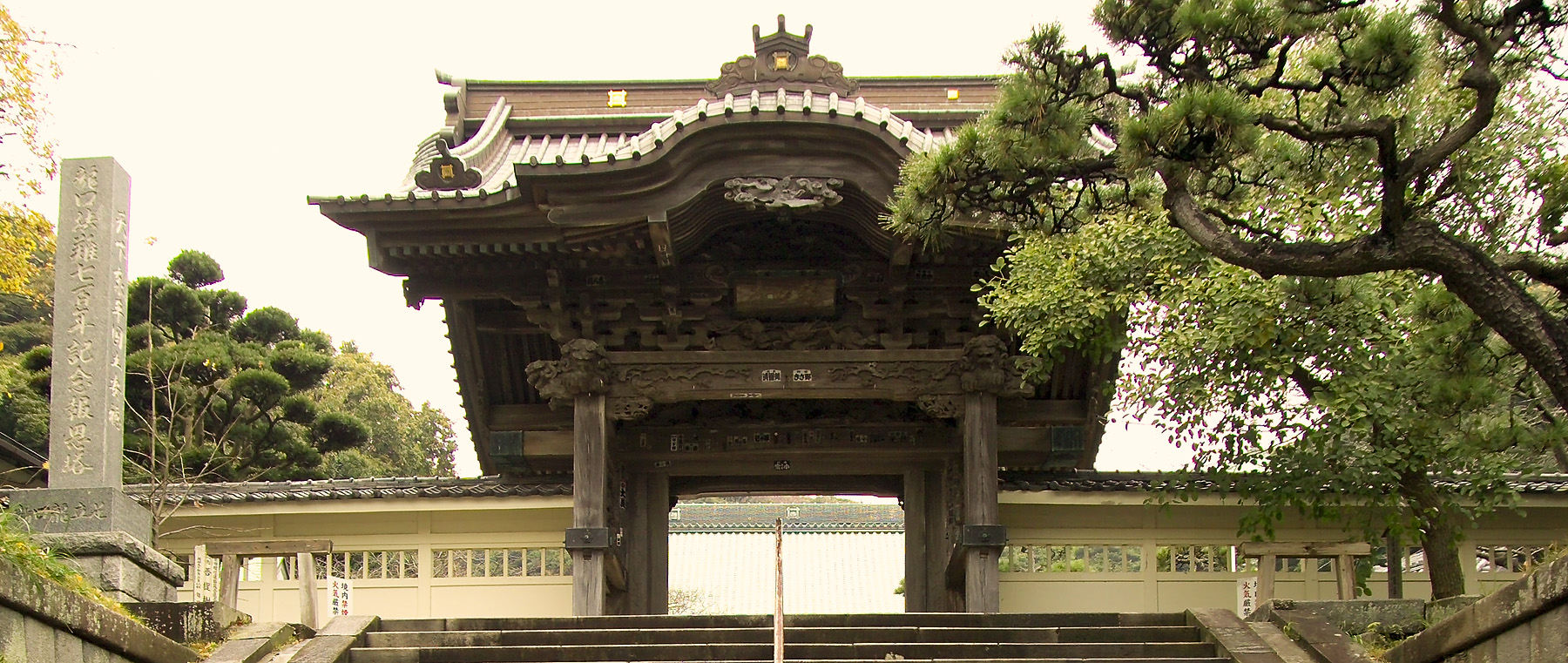
Inner gate

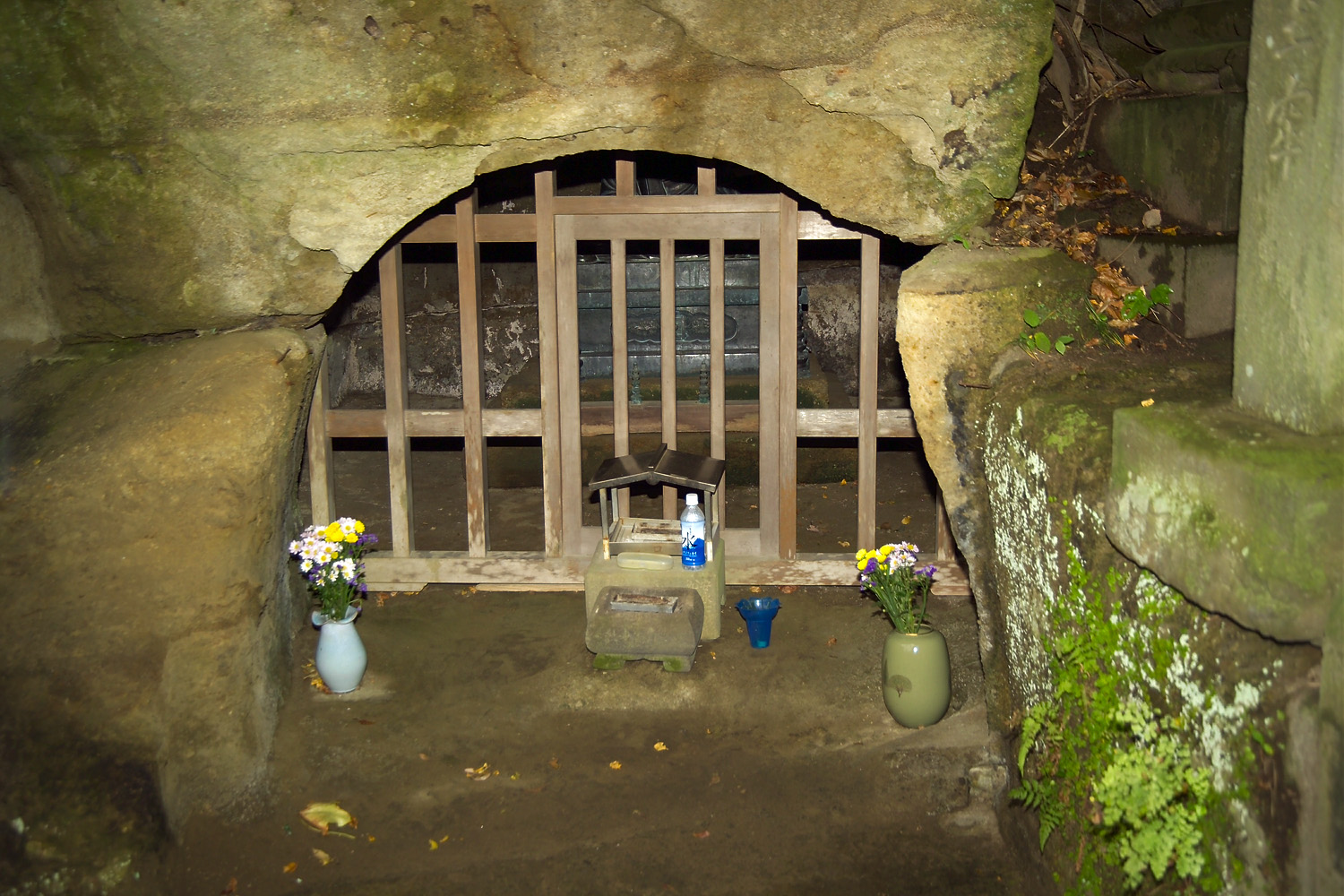
Cave where Nichiren was confined

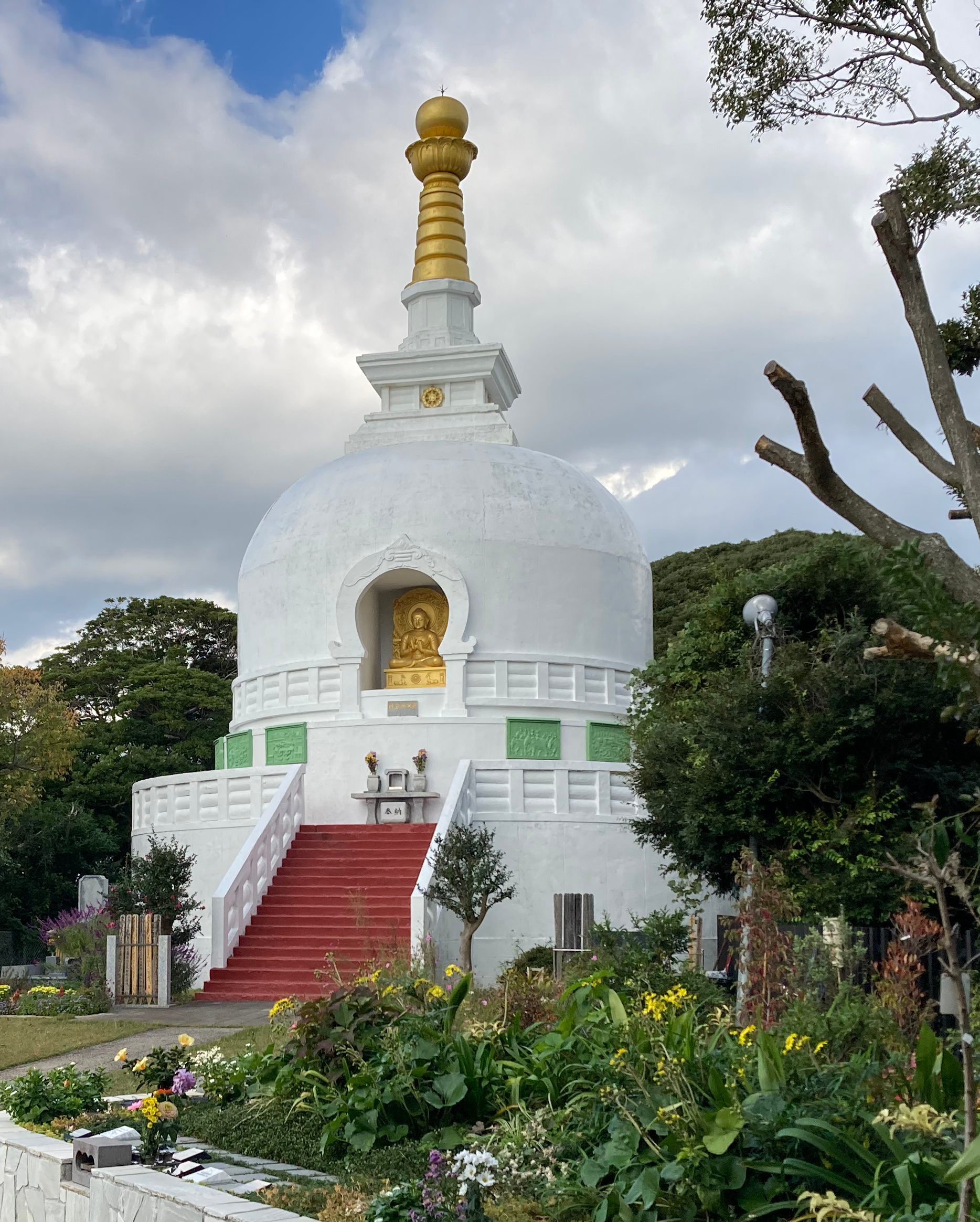
Stupa

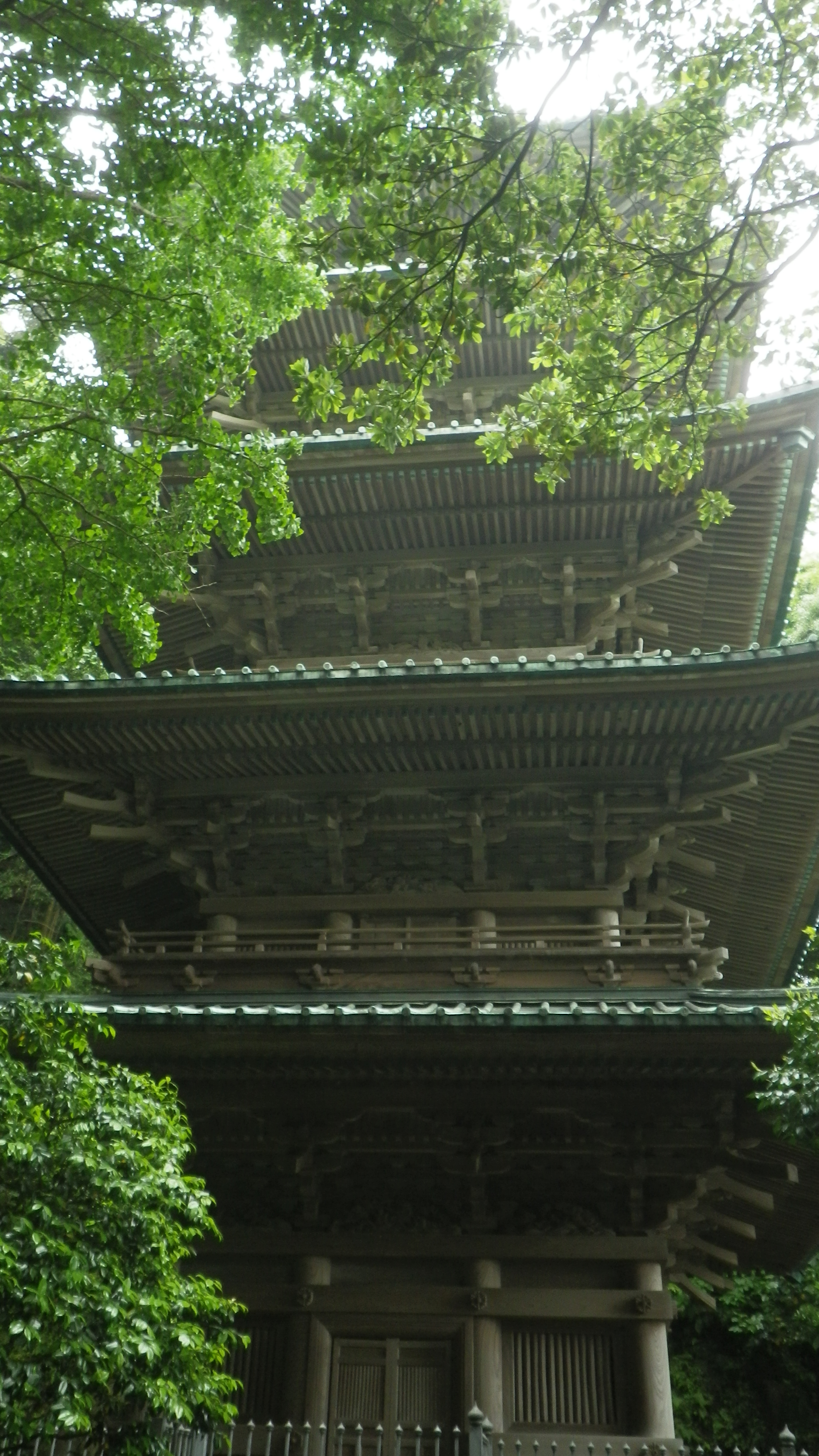
