= Kamakura's proposed World Heritage Sites =

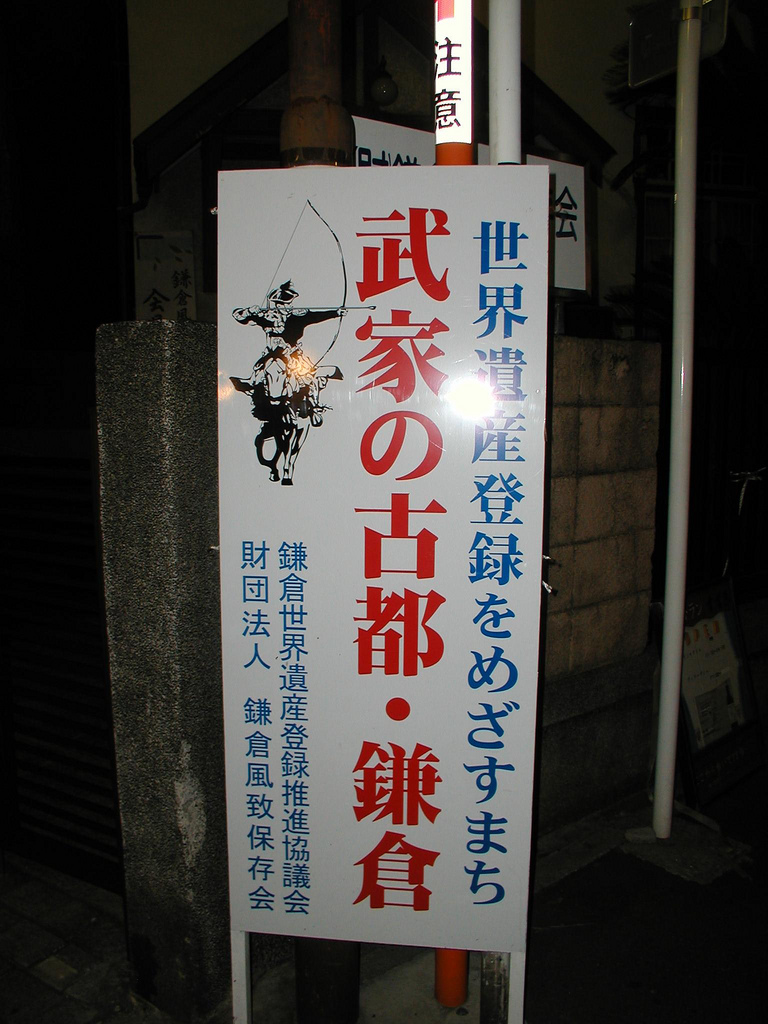
Sign in Kamakura advocating inscription on the World Heritage List (2007)

Kamakura, Home of the Samurai (武家の古都・鎌倉, Buke no koto・Kamakura) is a grouping of historic sites concentrated in and around the Japanese city of Kamakura, near Tokyo. The city gave its name to the Kamakura shogunate which governed the country during the Kamakura period (1185-1333). In 1992 the monuments were submitted jointly for inscription on the UNESCO World Heritage List under criteria i, ii, iii, iv, and vi.

In January 2012 it was announced that the Japanese government would formally submit the Kamakura site, along with Mount Fuji, for consideration by the World Heritage Committee in 2013. ICOMOS, the advisory body for cultural World Heritage Sites, inspected the site in late 2012. The request was considered by the World Heritage Committee at its 37th session in Phnom Penh, Cambodia in September, 2013. ICOMOS recommended not inscribing the site on the List, stating that the historical aspects of the site had largely been supplanted by the modern city that grew up around it and thus the site lacked the integrity necessary to be considered. The request for World Heritage status was duly withdrawn by Japan.

Ten candidate areas were proposed with twenty-two component sites, spanning the cities of Kamakura, Yokohama, and Zushi:

Site	Comments	Image
Tsurugaoka Hachiman-gū (鶴岡八幡宮)	Shinto shrine and symbol of the city; includes Wakamiya Ōji and Wakamiya subordinate shrine	
Jufuku-ji (寿福寺)	Rinzai temple in Ōgigayatsu; number three of Kamakura's Five Mountains	
Kenchō-ji (建長寺)	Greatest of Kamakura's Rinzai temples; number one of Kamakura's Five Mountains	
Zuisen-ji (瑞泉寺)	Rinzai temple in Nikaidō famous for its magnificent garden	
Kamakura Daibutsu (鎌倉大仏)	Kōtoku-in's iconic Buddha statue	
Kakuon-ji (覚園寺)	13th century Shingon temple in Nikaidō; has a cluster of yagura	
Ruins of Buppō-ji (仏法寺跡)	Ruins of a Buddhist temple near Gokuraku-ji	
Ruins of Yōfuku-ji (永福寺跡)	Ruins of a great Buddhist temple in Nikaidō	
Ruins of the Hokkedō (法華堂跡)	The area near Minamoto no Yoritomo's grave where the temple he was buried in used to stand	
Ruins of the Hōjō Tokiwa Residence (北条氏常盤亭跡)	Ruins in Tokiwa of one of the residences of the Hōjō Shikken	
Kamegayatsuzaka Pass (亀ヶ谷坂)	One of Kamakura's Seven Entrances	
Kehaizaka Pass (仮粧坂)	One of Kamakura's Seven Entrances	
Daibutsu Pass (大仏切通)	One of Kamakura's Seven Entrances	
Gokuraku-ji (極楽寺)	Shingon temple	
Engaku-ji (円覚寺)	Rinzai temple in Kita-Kamakura; number two of Kamakura's Five Mountains	
Egara Tenjin Shrine (荏柄天神神社)	One of the oldest shrines in Kamakura; enshrines Sugawara no Michizane	
Jōkōmyō-ji (浄光明寺)	13th century Shingon temple in Ōgigayatsu	
Asaina Pass (朝夷奈切通)	One of Kamakura's Seven Entrances	
Ruins of Tōshō-ji (東勝寺跡)	Ruins of the Hōjō family temple, burned in 1333 on the day of the fall of Kamakura	
Nagoshi Pass (名越切通)	One of Kamakura's Seven Entrances; has a cluster of yagura	
Shōmyō-ji (稱名寺)	Shingon temple in an area of Kanazawa-ku, Yokohama that used to be part of Kamakura	
Wakae Island (和賀江嶋)	An artificial island (the oldest in the country) in Zaimokuza	

== See also ==
- World Heritage Sites in Japan
