= Nameri River (Kanagawa) =

River in Kanagawa Prefecture, Japan

Coordinates: 35°18′32.84″N 139°32′44.82″E

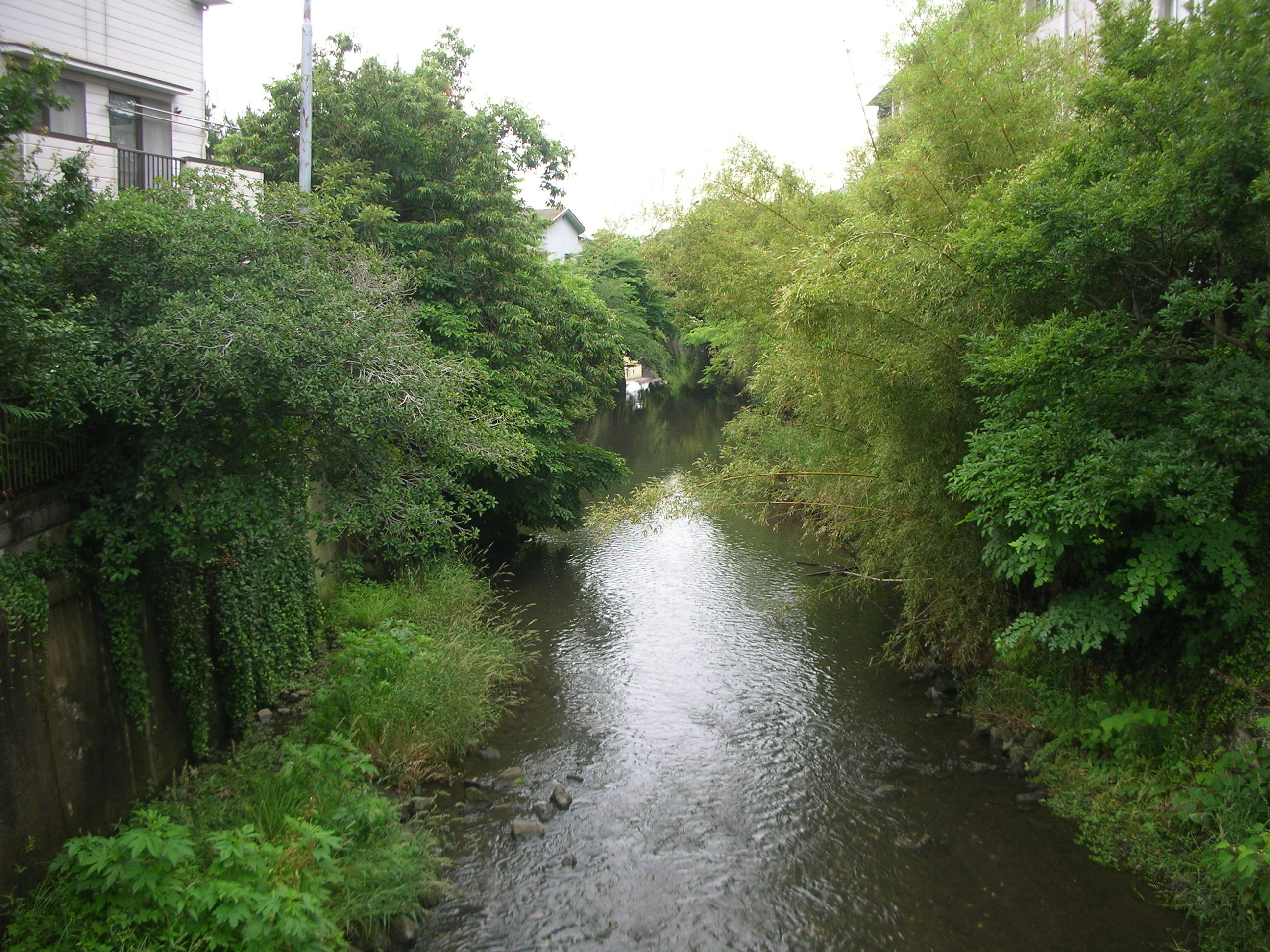

- Location within Japan

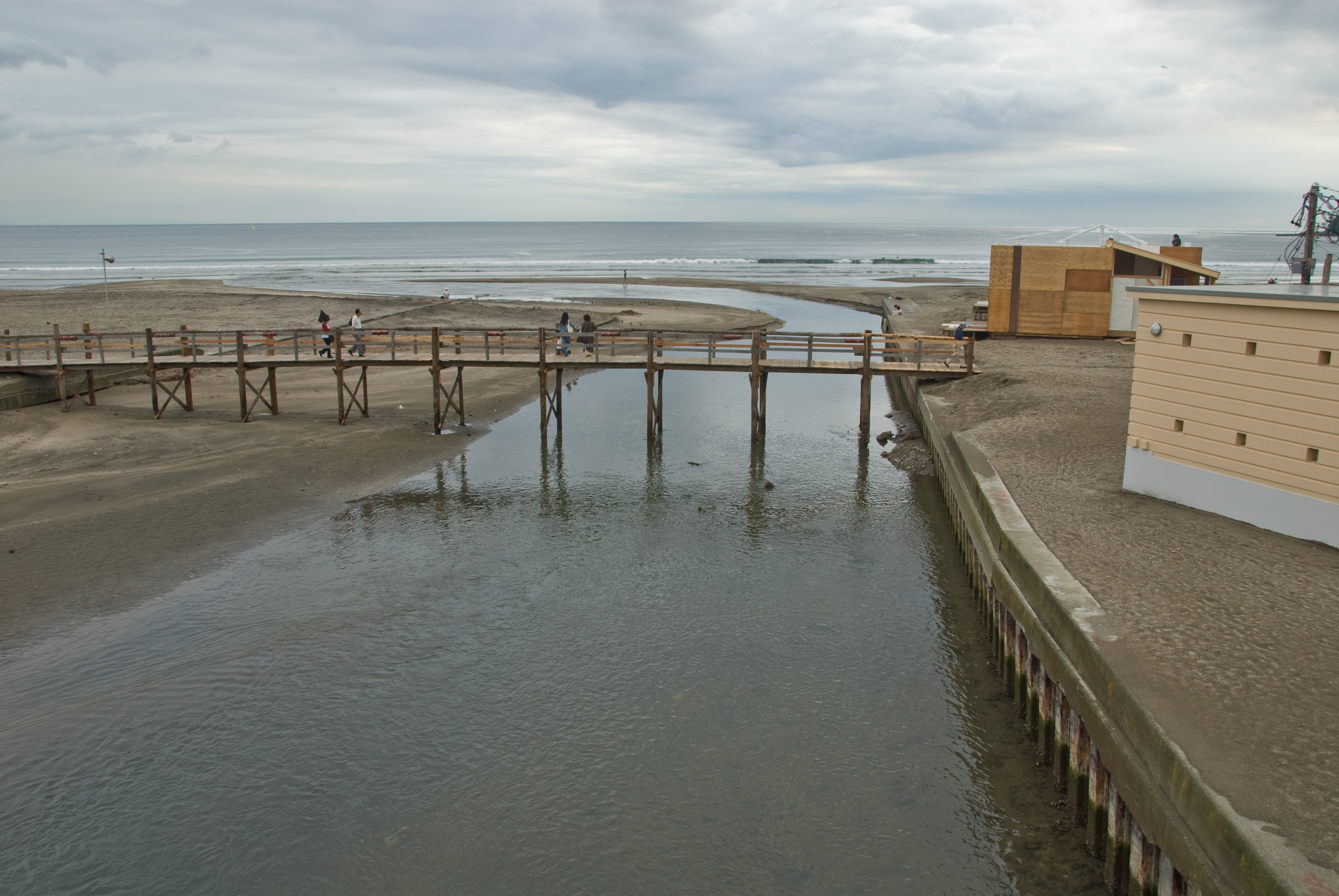
The Namerigawa in Yuigahama

The Nameri River (滑川, Nameri-gawa) is a river that goes from the Asaina Pass in northern Kamakura, Kanagawa, Japan, to the beach in Yuigahama, for a total length of about 8 km. Although Yuigahama is in fact the name of the entire 3.2 km beach that goes from Inamuragasaki to Zaimokuza's Iijima cape, the name is usually used just for its half west of the Namerigawa river's estuary, while the eastern half is called Zaimokuza Beach (材木座海岸). The name comes from the way it flows, apparently "licking" ("nameru" in Japanese) the stones at its bottom.

Only during the summer, during the bathing season, the river's estuary is crossed by a wooden bridge (in the photo).

Although very short, the river is called by locals with six different names according to the neighborhood it crosses. From the Asaina Pass to Jōmyō-ji it's about a meter wide and is called Kurumigawa (胡桃川). After the temple's gate it takes the name Namerigawa, becomes wider and follows the course of the Kanazawa Road. Near the Omidōbashi Bridge it changes name again becoming the Zazengawa (座禅川) in honor of Buddhist monk Mongaku, who used to live nearby. From Tōshōjibashi to Komachi it's called Ebisudōgawa (夷堂川). In the last few hundred meters of his course, from Ichi no Torii (Tsurugaoka Hachiman-gū's first torii gate) to the sea it assumes two names, first Sumiurigawa (墨売川) and finally Enmagawa (閻魔川). The name Namerigawa however is today the only one truly necessary

The stele on the bridge in Komachi, next to Hongaku-ji's gate, says.

This is one of Kamakura's Ten Bridges (鎌倉十橋). It is said that once here stood the Ebisudō (夷堂). This river is now called Namerigawa, but it used to have several names that changed according to the place. In its upper course it used to be called Kurumigawa, near Jomyo-ji's gate it was called Namerigawa, near the remains of Mongaku's residence it was called Zazengawa, here it was called Ebisudōgawa, near Enmyō-ji it was called Sumiurigawa and near the remains of the Enmadō it was called Enmadōgawa.
Erected in March 1932 by the Kamakurachō Seinendan

== Aoto Fujitsuna's coins ==
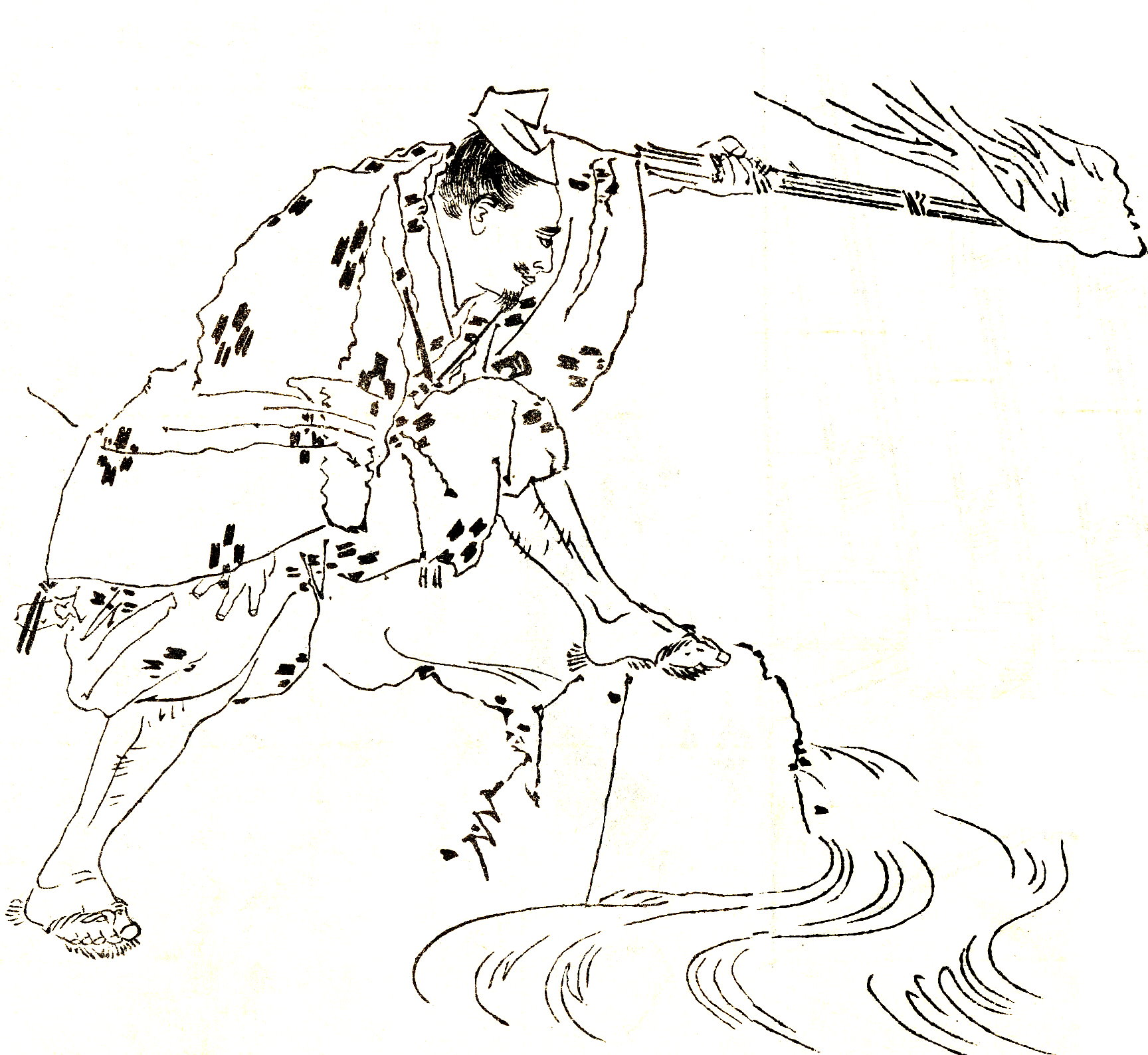
Aoto Fujitsuna fording the Namerigawa

The Taiheiki mentions the Namerigawa in a story well known to all in Kamakura. The stele on the spot near Tōshō-ji where events are supposed to have taken place describes the story as follows:

According to the Taiheiki, Aoto Fujitsuna was judge in Kamakura at the time of Regents Hōjō Tokimune and Hōjō Sadatoki. One evening, having lost 10 mon (文) in the Namerigawa, he bought a torch for fifty mon, entered in the water and started looking for the lost coins, finally finding them. Heard the story, people made fun of him saying that he ended up spending far more than he had lost. Fujitsuna replied that ten mon were not many, but losing them forever would have been a great loss. He had personally lost fifty mon, but he had done that for the benefit of all.
Erected in March 1938 by the Kamakurachō Shōnendan

== The Namerigawa in Kabuki ==
Judge Aoto Fujitsuna, together with the Namerigawa, became well known as a Kabuki character after becoming the subject of a popular series of story books published in 1812. The series later became the basis for several Kabuki plays. For example, the Kabuki play "Shiranami Gonon Otoko", also known as "Benten Kozō", mentions both Aoto Fujitsuna and the Namerigawa.

In the play, a criminal called Daemon sees head of police Aoto Fujitsuna on the Dōbashi bridge on the Namerigawa. Aoto, who is known as a man of virtue, explains that his men found an incense case while searching the Namerigawa for lost goods, and intends to return it to its rightful owners.
