= Zaimokuza =

Town in Kamakura, Kanagawa, Japan

Coordinates: 35°18′22″N 139°32′55″E

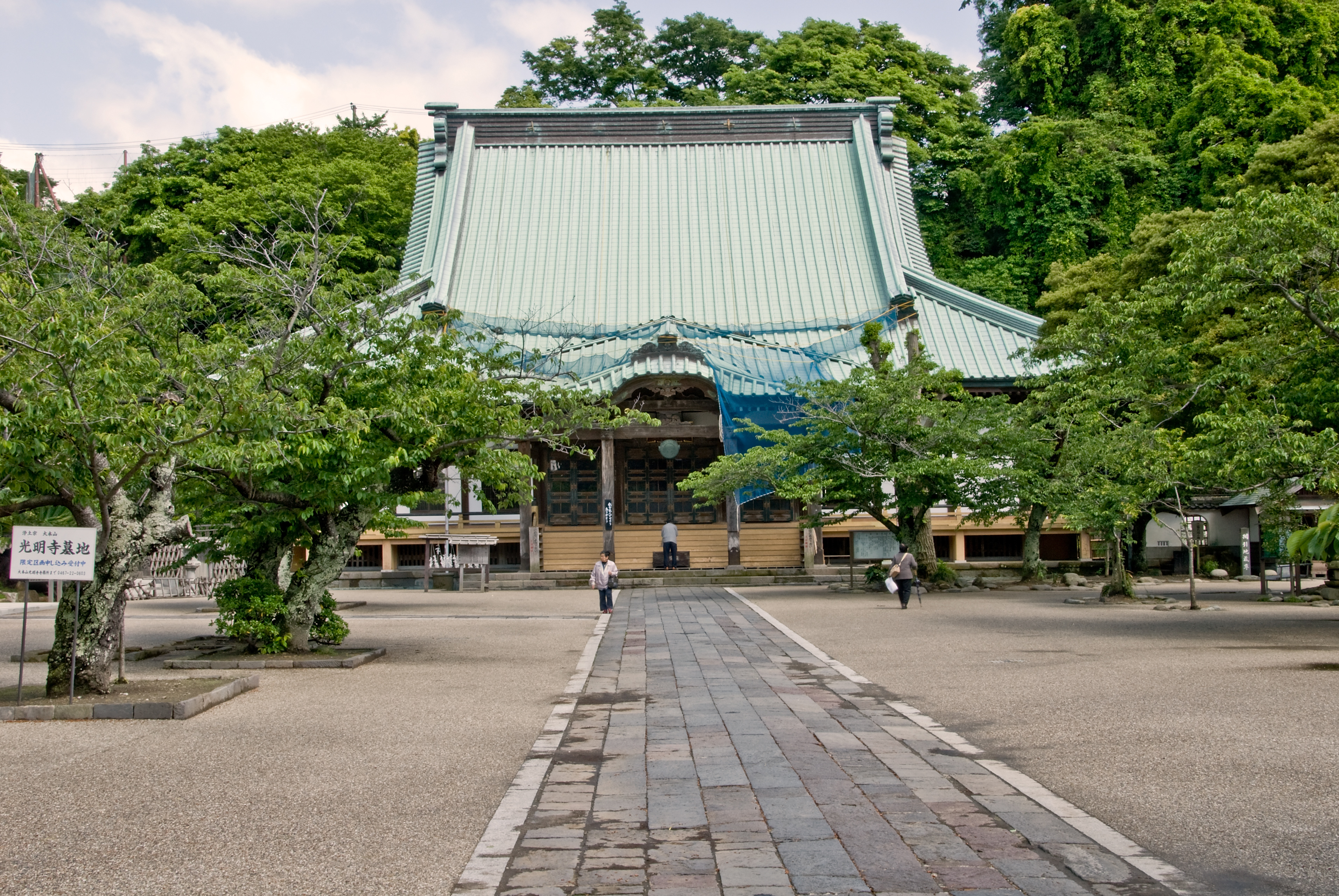
Kōmyō-ji in Zaimokuza

Zaimokuza (材木座) is an area within the Kamakura, Kanagawa Pref., in Japan that runs along the sea from Cape Iijima near Kotsubo harbor to the estuary of the Namerigawa. The relation between the beach's name and that of its neighboring areas is complex. Although Yuigahama is in fact the entire 3.2 km beach that goes from Inamuragasaki to Zaimokuza's Iijima cape, the name is usually used to indicate just its half west of the Namerigawa river, while the eastern half is called Zaimokuza Beach (材木座海岸). This is the reason why, although the beach gives its name to only the west part of the beachside area, traces of the name Yuigahama can be found also in Zaimokuza (for example in Moto Hachiman's official name, Yui Wakamiya).

Minamoto no Sanetomo, planning a voyage to China, allegedly had a big ship built here, but then couldn't sail it because of Sagami Bay's shallowness. Zaimokuza during the Kamakura period was a busy port of call for the commerce of lumber, and through it passed much of the material for the construction of Kamakura's famous temples and shrines. This is in fact the origin of its name: Zaimoku means lumber, and za was the guild of timber merchants and craftsmen of the area who served businessmen and temples. When the tide is low, at the west end of the beach are still visible the remains of Wakae Island, the oldest artificial island in the country and the harbor that served both Zaimokuza and Kamakura.

== Historical landmarks ==
- Wakae Island or Wakaejima - the remains of a medieval harbor
- Moto Hachiman, the original location of Tsurugaoka Hachiman-gū
- Kōmyō-ji
