= Yuigahama =

Beach in Kamakura, Kanagawa, Japan

Coordinates: 35°18′30.30″N 139°32′44.01″E

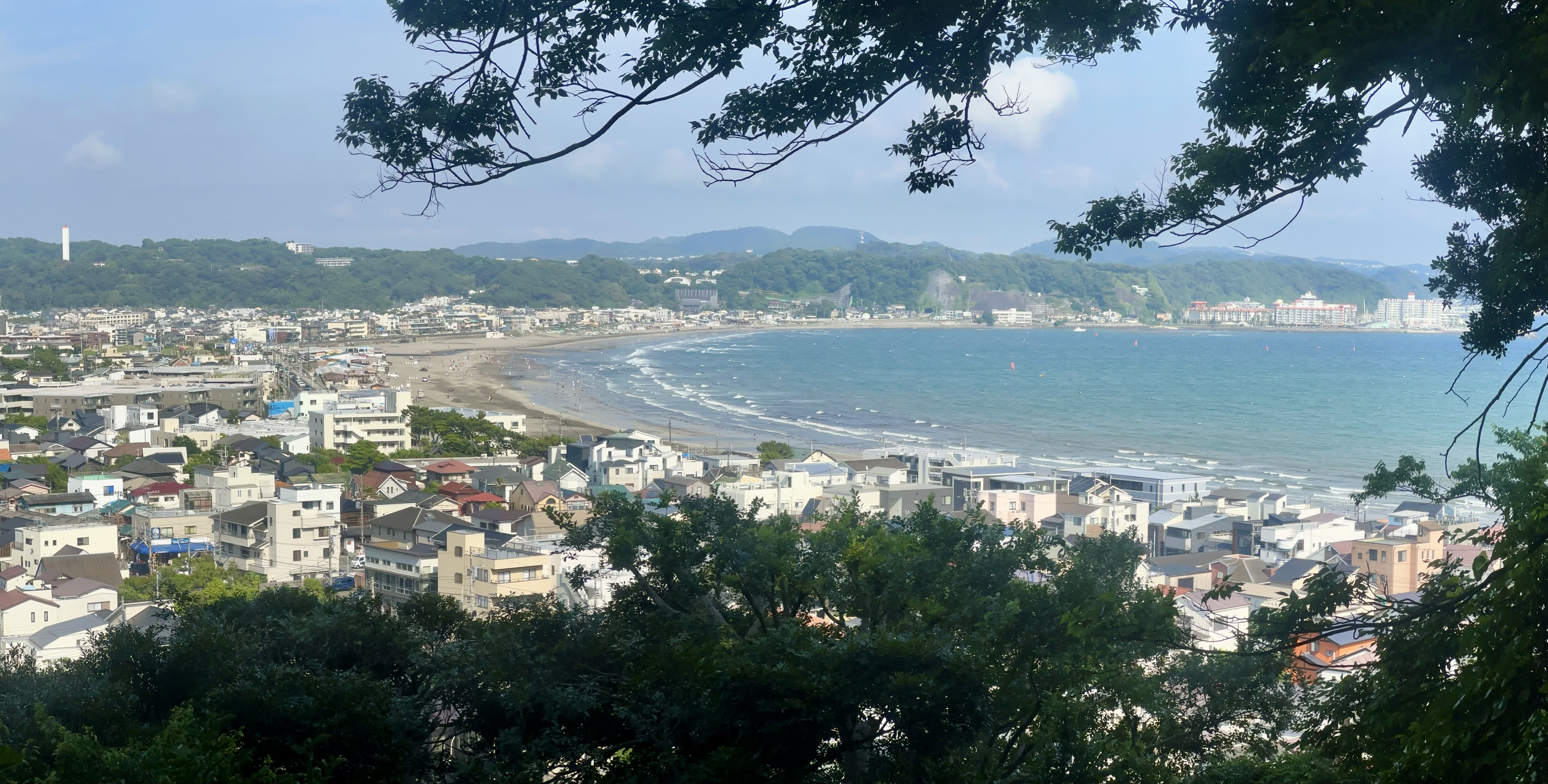
View of Yuigahama and surrounding area, 2025

Yuigahama (由比ヶ浜海岸) is a beach near Kamakura, a city in Kanagawa Prefecture, Japan. The relation between the beach and its neighboring areas is complex. Although Yuigahama is legally the entire 3.2 km beach that goes from Inamuragasaki, which separates it from Shichirigahama, to Zaimokuza's Iijima cape, which separates it from Kotsubo and the Miura Peninsula, the name is customarily used to indicate the portion west of the Namerigawa river, while the eastern half is called Zaimokuza Beach (材木座海岸). This is the reason why, although the beach gives its name to only the west part of the beachside community, traces of the name Yuigahama can be found also in Zaimokuza (for example in Moto Hachiman's official name, Yui Wakamiya). The center of Yuigahama came legally into being between 1964 and 1965 and was named after the beach. Today's Yuigahama was until then divided between Zaimokuza, Ōmachi, and Hase.

There are different theories about the origin of the name. According to one it derives from an earlier one, Yuigo (由比郷). According to another it derives from the presence of a cooperative (yui (結)). The name Yui itself has been written in various ways, among them 由井 and 湯井.

== History ==
During the Kamakura period both the beach and the nearby areas were called Maehama (前浜). The name appears repeatedly in the Azuma Kagami to indicate spots going from Hase to Wakamiya Ōji. It was used to practice martial arts such as Kogasagake (小笠懸) (horseback archery) and yabusame (a horseback archery competition). It became a battlefield in 1180 at the time of the battle against Hatakeyama Shigetada, and again in 1333 for the fight between Nitta Yoshisada and the defense forces of the Hōjō. Lastly, it became a battleground in 1416 during Uesugi Zenshū's rebellion. Human bones of the era are still occasionally found during excavations. It is on this beach that Nichiren, the founder of the Buddhist Nichiren sect, was put on a boat to be taken to Katase and ordered to be executed.

The beach was considered sacred ground to the Minamoto clan and, before visiting shrines in Izu or Hakone, the shōgun would always purify his body here.

=== Wakaejima ===
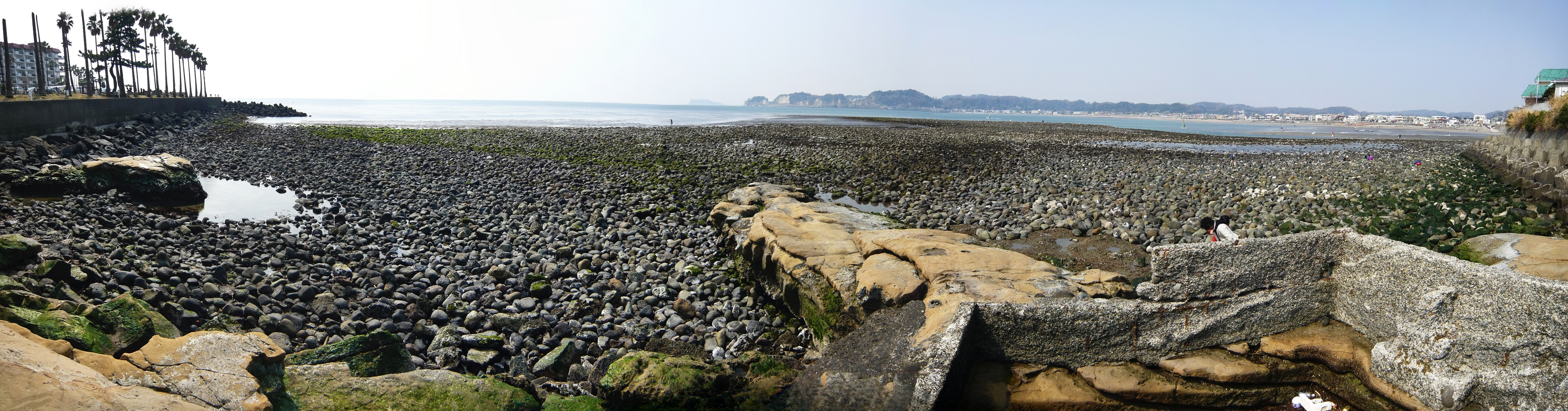
Wakae Island exposed by an exceptionally low tide

During the Kamakura shogunate, Sagami Bay was busy with trading ships, but its shallowness made indispensable the use of barges. Also, accidents between ships were common and it was therefore decided to build a port. A priest named Oamidabutsu (往阿弥陀仏), applied for permission from the shogunate to build an artificial port in the area. Permission was granted in 1232. Much of the timber used to build Kamakura's best shrines passed through Wakaejima.

In its first form, the harbor functioned as both a breakwater and a wharf, and was built with large stones laid as a foundation, with smaller stones on top. It was later extended gradually and repaired several times until the end of the Edo period, when it was abandoned.

== Extra reading ==
- 日本歴史地名大係 [Nihon Rekishi Chimei Taikei, online version]. Wakaejima (in Japanese). Heibonsha. Archived from the original on 2008-11-07.
- 日本歴史地名大係 [Nihon Rekishi Chimei Taikei, online version]. Maehama (in Japanese). Heibonsha. Archived from the original on 2008-11-07.
- Tomari Beach - Official Tokyo Guide
- Beaches in Japan
- Kusumoto, Katsuji (July 2002). Kamakura Naruhodo Jiten (in Japanese). Tokyo: Jitsugyō no Nihonsha. ISBN 978-4-408-00779-3. OCLC 166909395.
- Kamakura's Official Textbook for Culture and Tourism (鎌倉観光文化検定公式テキストブック), Kamakura Shunshūsha, 2008 (in Japanese); ISBN 978-4-7740-0386-3
