= Kotsubo =

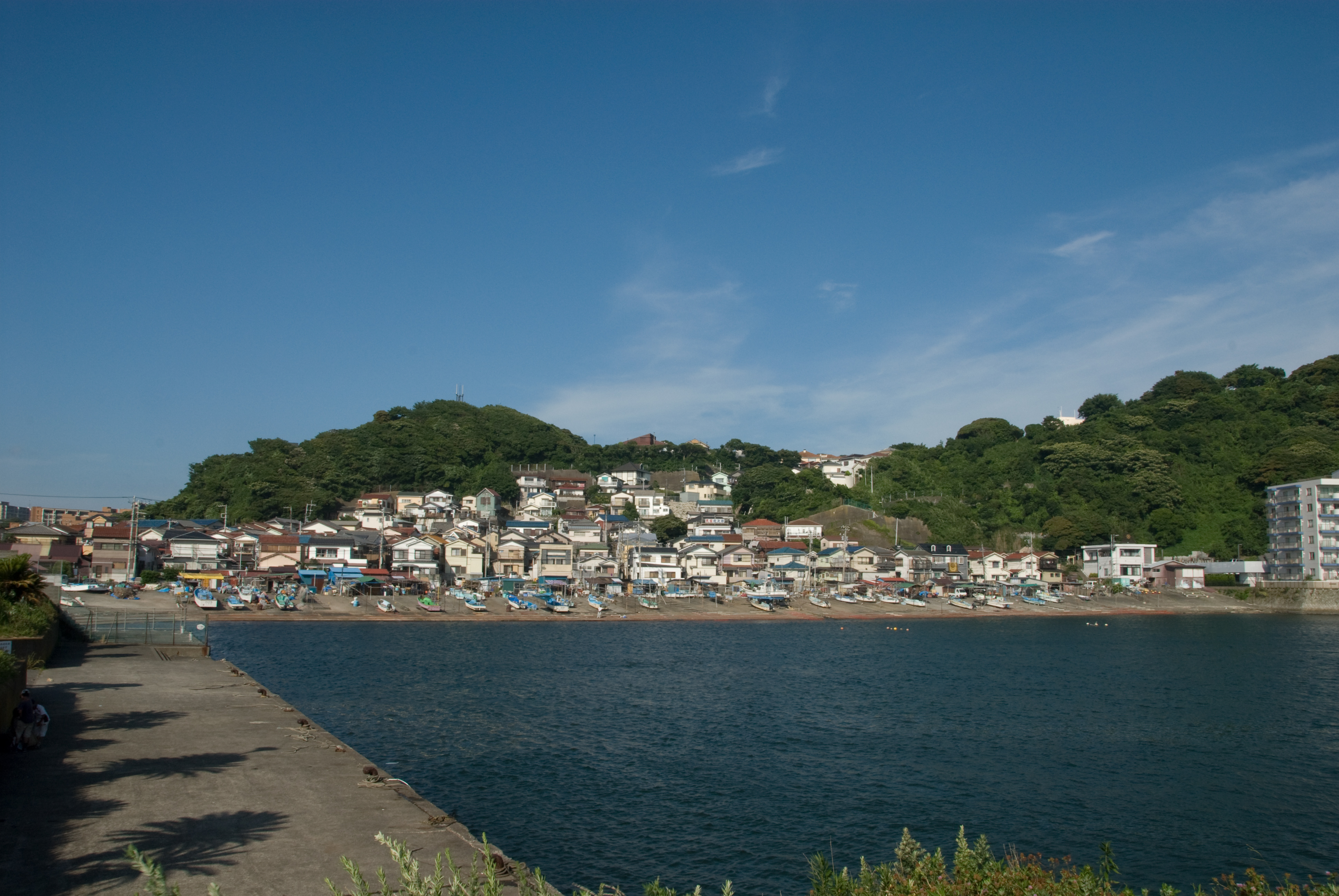
Kotsubo's Harbor

Kotsubo (Red Bluff) is a small fishing village in Zushi, Kanagawa Prefecture, Japan. It is halfway between Zushi and the old Japanese capital of Kamakura. It is on Sagami Bay and just over one hour by train from Tokyo.

== Location and scenery ==
The little fishing village is backed by steep hills. On top of one is Osaki Park, famous for its cherry blossom viewing in late March or early April, from where one can view the whole surrounding area. Across Sagami Bay can be seen Mount Fuji immediately behind Enoshima Island. Yuigahama Beach runs the whole way from Kotsubo up to the outskirts of Kamakura. On a clear day Shimoda and Odawara are visible. The southern vista looks over the beach of Zushi and the ancient coast running down to Hayama and its Imperial Summer Palace.

On the surrounding hills there are many small Shinto shrines and Buddhist temples, some over a thousand years old. Most of the housing is also very old but there are two large modern housing developments, one of which is called Cosmos Milos, dominates one hill and is designed to look like an old Greek village. On the sea-front there is a large apartment complex with the well-known yachting port of Zushi Marina.

== Activities and facilities ==
The village has fish markets from where many of the local sushi shops buy their daily supply of tuna and other fresh catches. The area has now become popular as a retirement resort and has an abundance of small specialist hospitals and clinics, many restaurants and exercise facilities.

== Transport ==
Kotsubo is easily accessed by bus from either Kamakura or Zushi. It normally takes about 15 minutes. Taxis from both places take about 10 minutes, except in July and August when sometimes travel can take an hour because beaches are visited by thousands of people every day.

== Weather ==
The summer months are very hot, well into the thirties (degrees Celsius), but the rest of the year is more temperate.
