= Wakae Island =

Artificial island in Japan

Coordinates: 35°18′2.52″N 139°33′2.02″E

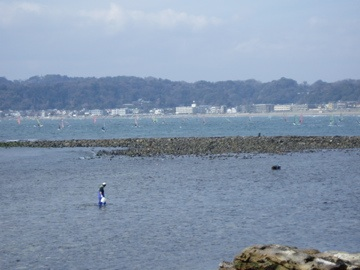
Wakae Island at low tide

Wakae Island, or Wakaejima (和賀江島, Wakae-jima) is an artificial island, the oldest in Japan, which is now in ruins. The name means "Waka Bay Island" from Zaimokuza's old name, Waka. Its remains are located at the east end of Zaimokuza Beach near Kamakura and are still visible at low tide. It was built in 1232 and, in spite of its state of disrepair, it has been declared a national Historic Site because it is the sole surviving example of an artificial harbor from the Kamakura period.

Although its component stones have sunk in the sand, its general contour is still clearly visible when the tide is low as a mound about 200m long. On its northern side there used to be several stone pillars used to moor ships in port call to avoid strong southern winds, but they are now all lost.

On the beach, a large rock surmounted by a black stele marks the position of the former port. The stele, erected by the Kamakuramachi Seinendan (Kamakura Youth Club) in 1924, explains the history of the site and its importance.

== History ==
During the Kamakura shogunate, Sagami Bay was busy with trading ships, but the shallowness of the bay made the use of barges indispensable. Accidents between ships were common and it was therefore decided to build a port. A priest named Ōamidabutsu (往阿弥陀仏) applied for permission from the Shogunate to build an artificial port in the area. Permission was granted in 1232.

In its first form, the harbor functioned as both a breakwater and a wharf and was built with large stones laid as a foundation, with smaller stones on top. It was later extended gradually and repaired several times until the end of the Edo period, when it was abandoned.

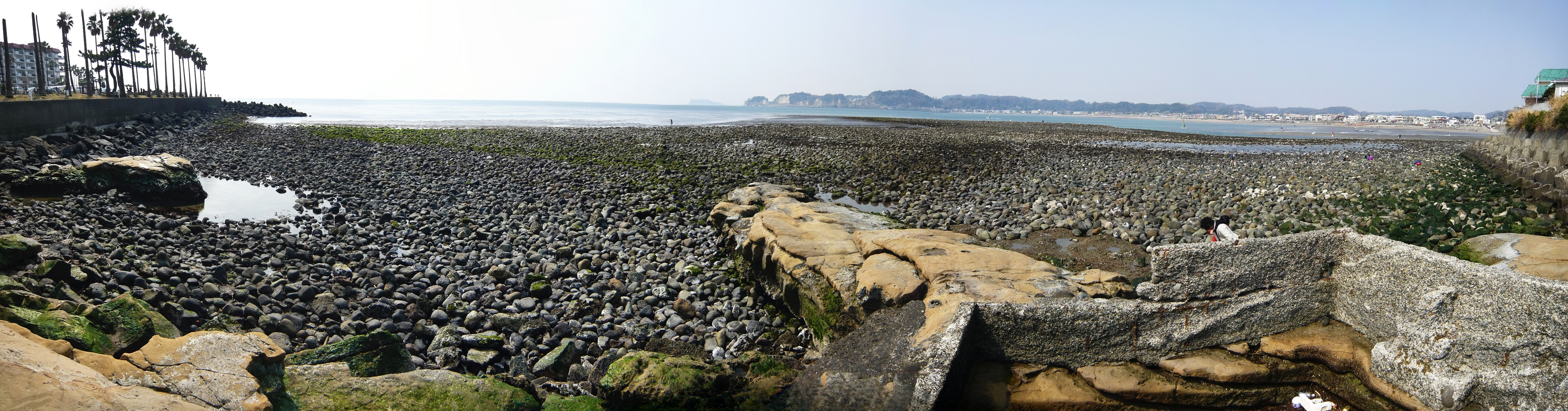
Wakae Island exposed by an exceptionally low tide

== Text on the stele ==
The original inscription is in old-fashioned Japanese. Here follows a translation of the text based on the transcription in modern Japanese provided by the Kamakura Citizen Net .

"Waka" is the former name of today's Zaimokuza. This place used to be a harbor where timber was collected and shipped and, for this reason, the town's name changed soon to the present one.
Wakae Island was an embankment built to avoid the destruction by the waves of Waka's harbor. 768 years ago, a priest named Oamidabutsu asked permission for its building and, with the support of Moritsuna, work was started on July 15 and ended on August 9.
Erected in March 1924 – The Kamakura Youth Club
