= Moto Hachiman =

Shinto shrine in Kanagawa Prefecture, Japan

Yui Wakamiya 由比若宮
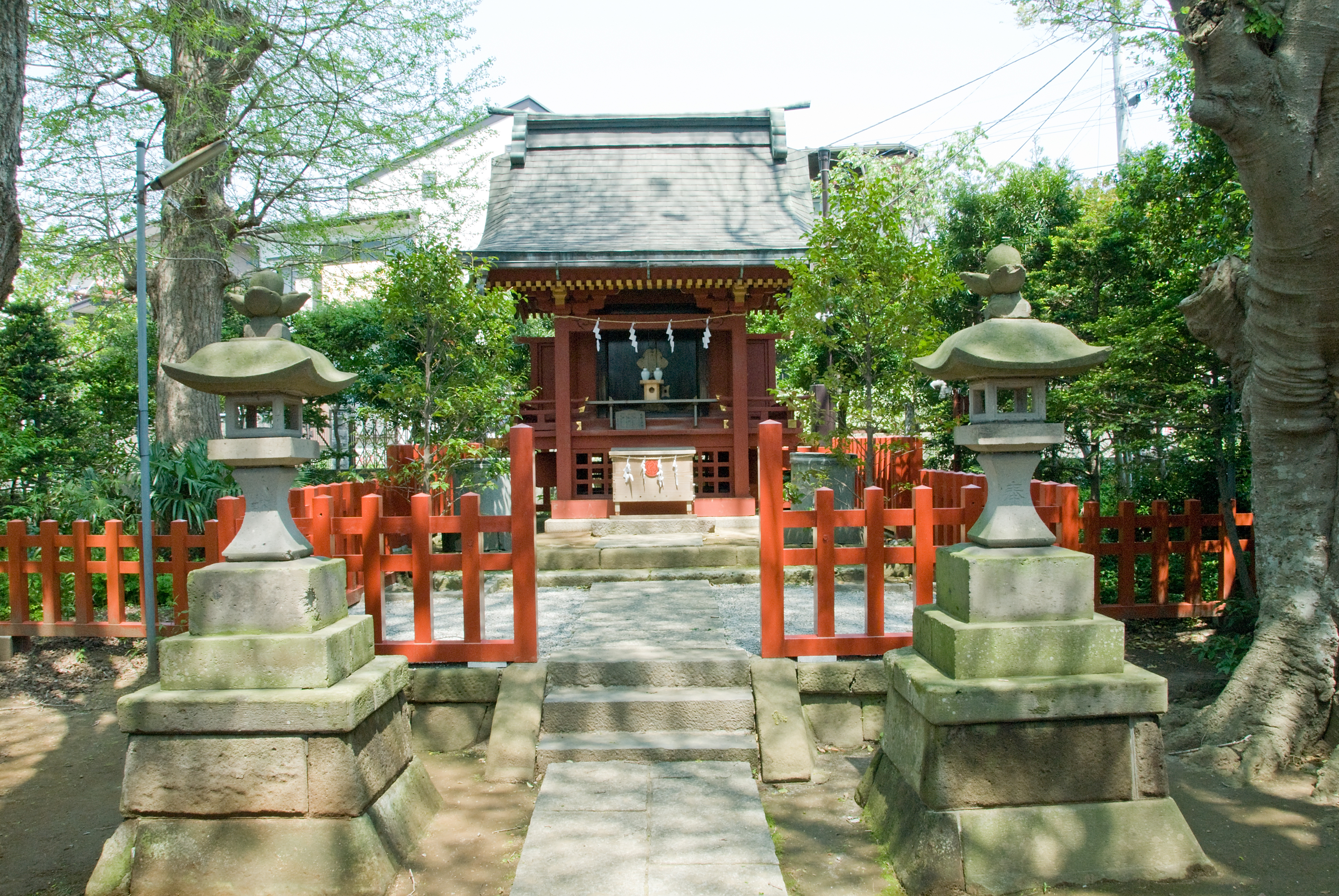
- The honden

- Location within Japan

Religion
- Affiliation: Shinto
- Deity: Hachiman
- Type: Hachiman shrine

Location
- Location: Zaimokuza 1-7-9
- Interactive map of Yui Wakamiya 由比若宮
- Coordinates: 35.312726°N 139.552647°E

Architecture
- Founder: Minamoto no Yoriyoshi
- Established: 1063

Website
- none

Moto Hachiman (元八幡) is a small but very old and historically important Shinto shrine in Kamakura, Kanagawa Prefecture, Japan.

== History ==
Although officially called Yui Wakamiya (由比若宮), this tiny shrine in Zaimokuza is universally known as Moto Hachiman ("original Hachiman", a nickname which appears even on road signs), and in front of its torii stands a stele with the words Moto Tsurugaoka Hachiman-gū (元鶴岡八幡宮). This unattended shrine consists of just a torii, two stone lanterns (tōrō), and a honden or sanctuary, where the kami Hachiman is enshrined. It is however illustrious because it is the original location of the great Tsurugaoka Hachiman-gū, symbol of Kamakura.

The sign that stands in front of the shrine says:

About the origin of the name Tsurugaoka Hachiman-gū, the Azuma Kagami says that: "Minamoto no Yoriyoshi, after his victorious campaign against Abe no Sadatō, in August 1063 erected this temple and transferred in it part of Kyoto's Iwashimizu Hachiman-gū's kami. In February 1081 the shrine was repaired by Minamoto no Yoshiie."
It is likely that this area was then called "Tsurugaoka". On the 12th day of the 10th month of 1180 Minamoto no Yoritomo, in order to worship his ancestors, had Yui Wakamiya transferred from its current spot to the mountain north of an area called Kobayashi, and that became Tsurugaoka Hachiman-gū. When the Azuma Kagami says that Minamoto no Yoritomo at last visited his distant ancestors at Tsurugaoka Hachiman-gū, it means this shrine. The new shrine used its predecessor's name without changes. From that moment, this place has been called Moto Hachiman.

Yoriyoshi's decision had profound consequences for the country, because, since Hachiman was the Minamoto's tutelary kami, Kamakura was now the land of his family's ancestors. This, together with the fact Kamakura is a natural fortress and his desire to leave Kyoto, convinced Yoritomo this was the right place to found his shogunate. As a consequence, Kamakura became the unofficial capital of Japan.

It is unclear when the shrine's official name was changed into Yui Wakamiya. Moto Hachiman is National Historic Site.
