= Ikkyū-san (TV series) =

Japanese anime television series

- Title card
- 一休さん
- Genre: Historical, comedy
- Directed by: Kimio Yabuki (chief)
- Music by: Seiichirō Uno
- Country of origin: Japan
- Original language: Japanese
- No. of episodes: 296

Production
- Executive producer: Chiaki Imada
- Producers: Minato Sakanashi; Tomiro Kuriyama; Yoshio Takami; Shinichi Miyazaki; Yuyake Usui
- Production companies: NET/TV Asahi; Toei Animation

Original release
- Network: ANN (NET/TV Asahi)
- Release: October 15, 1975 – June 28, 1982

Related
- Anime film

Ikkyū-san and the Mischievous Princess
- Directed by: Kimio Yabuki
- Produced by: Chiaki Imada
- Written by: Masaki Tsuji
- Music by: Seiichirō Uno
- Studio: Toei Animation
- Released: March 18, 1978
- Runtime: 15 minutes
- Anime television film

Ikkyū-san: Rampage of the Mischievous Princess
- Directed by: Kimio Yabuki; Iku Ishiguro; Takeshi Shirado; Akinori Orai
- Produced by: Chiaki Imada
- Written by: Masaki Tsuji
- Music by: Seiichirō Uno
- Studio: Toei Animation
- Released: August 25, 1980
- Runtime: 50 minutes
- Anime film

Ikkyū-san: It's Spring! Mischievous Princess
- Directed by: Kimio Yabuki
- Produced by: Chiaki Imada
- Written by: Masaki Tsuji
- Music by: Seiichirō Uno
- Studio: Toei Animation
- Released: March 14, 1981
- Runtime: 15 minutes
- Anime film

Congming de Yixiu: Fan Dou Gongzhu Mischievous Princess & Ikkyū-san
- Directed by: Jiancheng Lei; Jianzhong Wu
- Written by: Shu Pu; Takashi Washio
- Music by: Roc Chen
- Studio: Shanghai Shendong Culture Communication
- Released: April 30, 2014
- Runtime: 85 minutes

Ikkyū-san (Japanese: 一休さん, pronounced [ik̚kʲɨᵝːsã̠ɴ]) is a Japanese historical comedy anime series produced by Toei Animation, based on the recorded early life of Zen Buddhist monk Ikkyū during his stay at Ankoku-ji temple.

The Ikkyū-san anime was directed by Kimio Yabuki and written by Makoto Tsuji, Tadaki Yamazaki, Hisao Okawa, Tatsuo Tamura, Hiroyasu Yamaura and Keisuke Fujikawa. It aired on TV Asahi from October 15, 1975, to June 28, 1982.

The series was received by all ages in Japan and throughout Asia, as it is mostly non-violent. Even when violence appears, it is usually presented in a mild or necessary way (for example, there are occasional references to the Ōnin War). In 1976, there was also a theatrical film released as part of the Toei Manga Matsuri film festival in the summer of that year. A film retelling of the Mischievous Princess film was released in 2014.

== Summary ==
Ikkyū-san (一休宗純, Ikkyū Sōjun) was born in 1394 in Kyoto. He was the son of Emperor Go-Komatsu and Mrs. Iyo. Ikkyu and his mother had to leave the palace because of the political problem of Japan. When he was 5 years old, he was separated from his mother and was sent to be ordained at Ankoku-ji temple. Great artistic liberties are taken with regards to the depiction of Ikkyu's cartoon version and his real-life counterpart. In the anime, he is so cute and very neat. In the series, Ikkyū relies on his intelligence and wit to solve all types of problems, from distraught farmers to greedy merchants. A running gag of Ikkyū-san is that whenever Ikkyū is trying to think of a plan, he sits in a lotus position, wets his two index fingers, and rotates them above his head.

== Cast ==
- Toshiko Fujita as Ikkyū-san
- Reiko Katsura as Sayo-chan
- Sanji Hase as Shūnen
- Kōhei Miyauchi as Gaikan Oshō
- Keiichi Noda as Shinemon Ninagawa
- Keaton Yamada as Yoshimitsu Ashikaga

== Reception ==
In 2005, Japanese television network TV Asahi conducted an online web poll for the top one hundred anime, and Ikkyū-san placed 85th tied with Hana no Ko Lunlun.

This animation has become one of the most famous Japanese anime in China, and this anime was chosen to promote international tourism.

== Trivia ==
Ikkyū-san is referenced in 2008 by Tokine Yukimura in a flashback on episode 50 of Kekkaishi.

Wednesday Campanella have a song and PV named after Ikkyu-san.
