= Shōkoku-ji =

Buddhist temple in Japan

Shōkoku-ji 相国寺
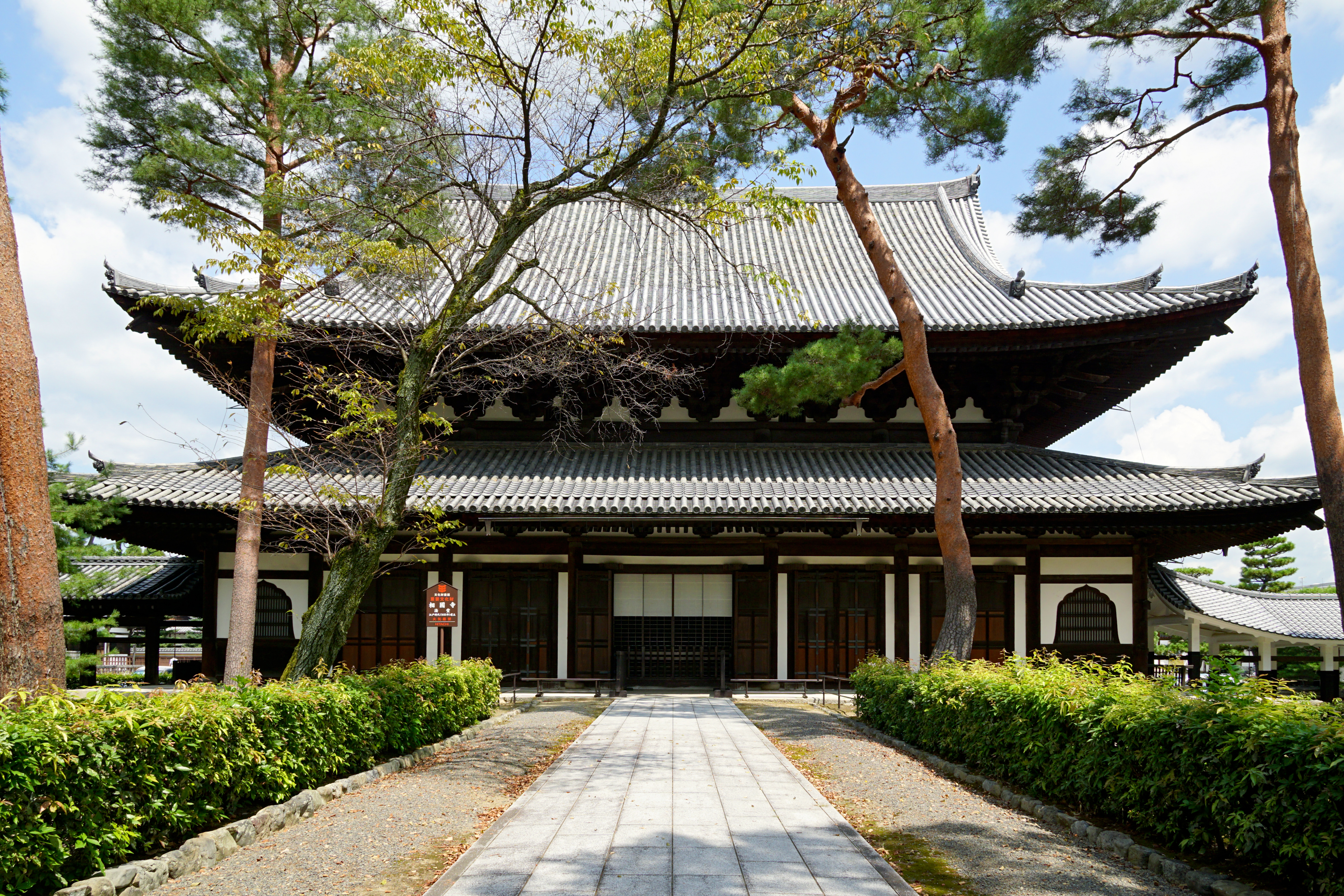

Religion
- Affiliation: Shōkoku-ji Rinzai
- Deity: Shaka Nyorai (Śākyamuni)
- Status: Head Temple, Five Mountain Temple (Kyoto)

Location
- Location: 701 Shōkokuji Monzen-chō, East of Karasuma and Imadegawa Street, Kamigyō-ku, Kyōto, Kyoto Prefecture
- Country: Japan
- Interactive map of Shōkoku-ji 相国寺
- Coordinates: 35°1′59″N 135°45′44.45″E

Architecture
- Founder: Ashikaga Yoshimitsu and Musō Soseki
- Established: 1382
- Completed: 1807

Website
- https://www.shokoku-ji.jp/en/

Shōkoku-ji (相国寺), formally identified as Mannen-zan Shōkoku Shōten Zenji (萬年山相國承天禅寺), is a Buddhist temple in northern Kyoto, first founded in 1382 by Ashikaga Yoshimitsu, with the existing temple complex having undergone several periods of extensive reconstruction and rebuilding in the succeeding eras.

== History ==
Shōkoku-ji was founded in the middle Muromachi period. Initial construction of the central temple structures was begun in 1383, and the entire temple complex was initially dedicated in 1392. In the eighth month of the third year of Meitoku, Yoshimitsu organized a great banquet attended by all the great officers of the Imperial court and the military leaders of that time. The pomp and ceremony of the affair was said to have equaled an Imperial event.

In 1383, the Zen master Shun’oku Myōha (春屋妙葩) (1311–1388) was designated by Yoshimitsu as founding abbot; however, Myōha insisted that the official honor be posthumously accorded to his own teacher, Musō Soseki. The formal decision to grant this posthumous honor was proclaimed in 1385.

The entire temple complex was destroyed by fire in 1394, but reconstruction financed by Yoshimitsu followed soon after. The temple complex has been rebuilt many times over the centuries, notably during the Onin War.

After the Muromachi period, Shōkoku-ji was supported by several national leaders such as Toyotomi Hideyoshi, his son Toyotomi Hideyori, and Tokugawa Ieyasu, all of whom helped finance the temple’s various reconstruction projects.

- Hideyori financed the 1605 reconstruction of the Hattō (Dharma Hall); and this structure, designated as an Important Cultural Property, is presently the oldest building of its type in Japan.
- Ieyasu donated the Sanmon (Mountain Gate) in 1609.
- Emperor Go-Mizunoo donated an imperial palace building to serve as the Kaisando (Founder’s Hall).

Other buildings were reconstructed during this period, but, with the notable exception of the 17th-century hatto, the temple complex was largely devastated during the conflagration of 1788. Some structures, including the Hojo and the Kuri, were later rebuilt in the 19th century.

== Dragon ==
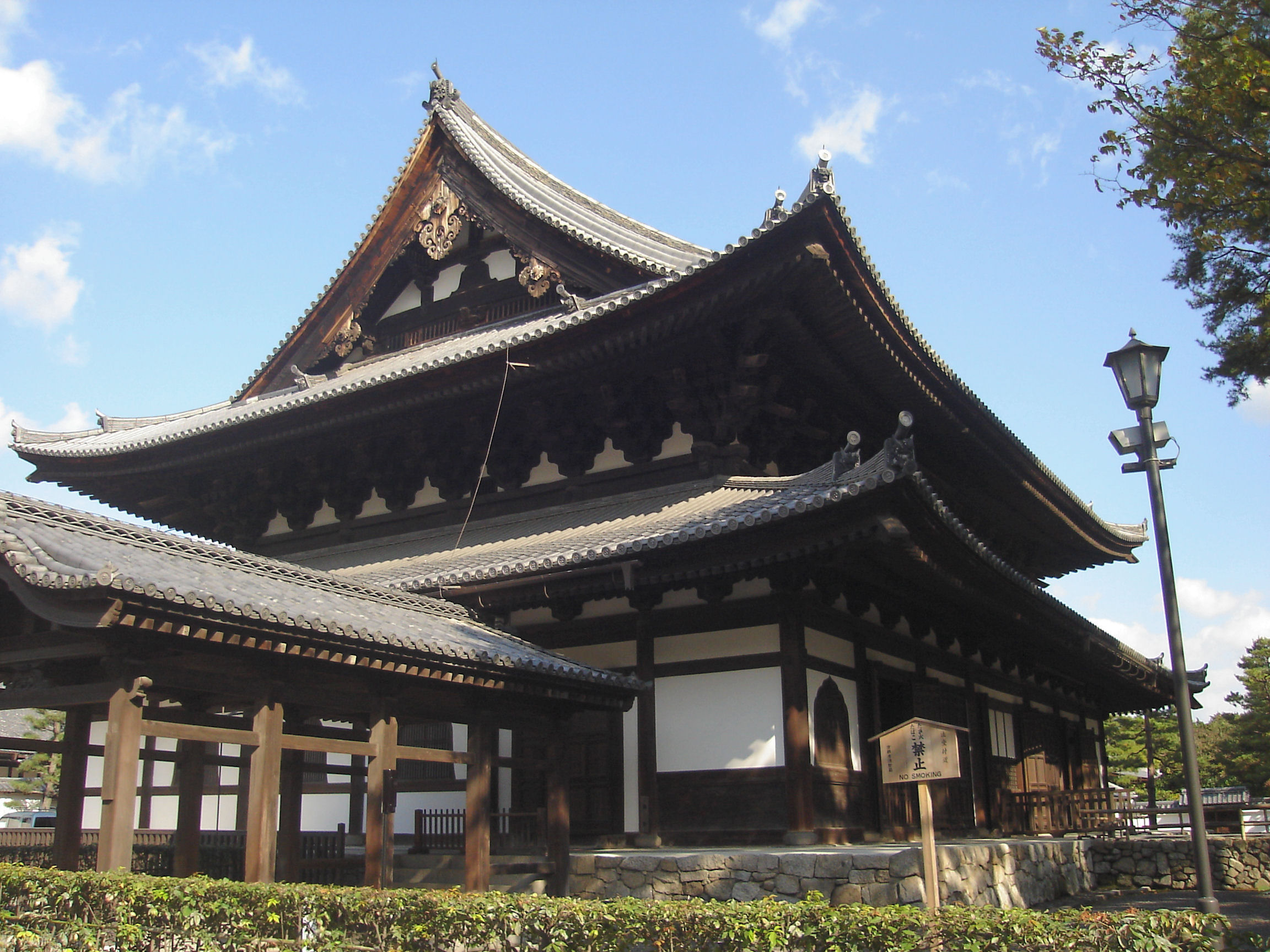
The Hattō hall (法堂) with the dragon painting inside

The Hattō hall (法堂) has on its slightly domed ceiling a large painting of a dragon. The painting was done by Kanō Mitsunobu (1565–1608). The dragon symbolises the rain of Buddhist teachings. When clapping the hands together, the sound reverberates between the slightly domed ceiling and the paved stone floor, echoing throughout the hall as if it was the thunder of the dragon.

The main hall of Kennin-ji in Kyoto also has a large dragon on its ceiling.

== Buddhist center ==
Shōkoku-ji is considered to be one of the so-called Kyoto Gozan or "five great Zen temples of Kyoto". It was ranked the second of the Kyoto during the medieval period. For a short time in 1392, Shōkoku-ji was considered first amongst the Gozan.

Shōkoku-ji is one of fourteen autonomous branches of the Rinzai school of Japanese Zen. Today the temple is headquarters for the Shōkoku-ji branch of Rinzai Zen, with over ninety affiliated temples, including the famous Golden Pavilion and the Silver Pavilion temples in Kyoto.

The Jotenkaku Museum is located in the premises of the temple.

== See also ==
- List of National Treasures of Japan (crafts-others)
- List of National Treasures of Japan (writings)
- Itō Jakuchū
- Hōkō-ji, today a sub-temple
- List of Buddhist temples in Kyoto
- List of tallest structures built before the 20th century
