= Gozan =

Gozan may refer to:

- Jazan, Saudi Arabia
- The ancient River Gozan, Amu Darya, the River Amu or Oxus, a river in North Afghanistan and Central Asia.
- the Five Mountain System, a Japanese network of Zen temples (Gozan Seidō)
- Tell Halaf, a Syrian archeological site near the city of Guzana or Gozan
