= Ikkyū =

Japanese Zen Buddhist monk (1394–1481)

Ikkyū Sōjun
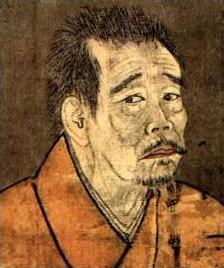
- Title: Zen master

Personal life
- Born: February 1, 1394 Kyoto, Japan
- Died: December 12, 1481 (aged 87) Kyōtanabe, Kyoto
- Other name: Shūken

Religious life
- Religion: Buddhism
- School: Rinzai
- Dharma name: Ikkyū Sōjun

Senior posting
- Predecessor: Kaso

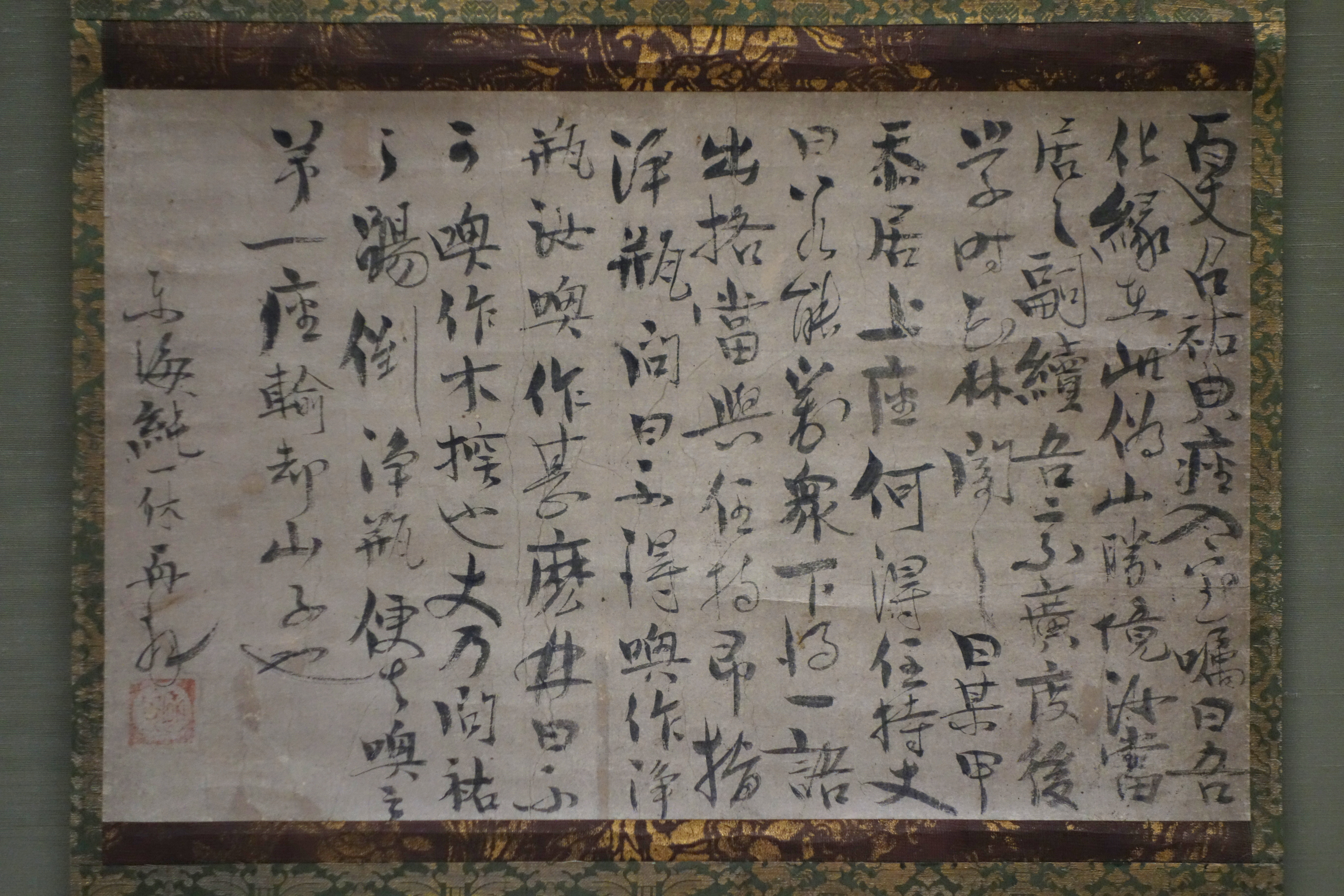
Buddhist verse by Ikkyū

Ikkyū (一休宗純, Ikkyū Sōjun; February 1, 1394 – December 12, 1481) was a Japanese Zen Buddhist monk and poet who had a great impact on the infusion of Japanese art and literature with Zen attitudes and ideals. He is perhaps best known for his radical approach to Zen, which included breaking Buddhist monastic precepts and his stance against celibacy. (Note: Chan sources discuss the power of awakening to free one from the karmic consequences that come from violating the precepts, including the precept against sexual misconduct. For example, the Long Scroll, which contains the earliest known records of Chan, states: "Dharma can give us fearlessness, it is a place of great peace. It is like someone who commits a mortal crime. He surely must be beheaded. But if it happens that his king grants him a pardon, he avoids the anxiety of a death sentence. Sentient beings are also like this. They commit the ten evils and the five transgressions and must fall into a hell, but the Dharma King grants them a pardon of great quiescence, and so they avoid all their sins. [...] If someone breaks the precepts and commits murder, commits sexual crimes and thievery, and fears falling into a hell, when he sees his own Dharma King, he will then obtain liberation." See also the Bloodstream Sermon, attributed to Bodhidharma, though likely a product of the Oxhead School: "...since married laymen don't give up sex, how can they become buddhas? I only talk about seeing your nature. I don't talk about sex simply because you don't see your nature. Once you see your nature, sex is basically immaterial. It ends along with your delight in it. Even if some habits remain, they can't harm you, because your nature is essentially pure. Despite dwelling in a material body of four elements, your nature is basically pure. It can't be corrupted.")

== Biography ==
=== Childhood ===
Ikkyū was born in 1394 in a small suburb of Kyoto. It is generally held that he was the son of Emperor Go-Komatsu and a low-ranking court noblewoman. His mother was forced to flee to Saga, where Ikkyū was raised by servants. At the age of five, Ikkyū was separated from his mother and placed in a Rinzai Zen temple in Kyoto called Ankoku-ji, as an acolyte. The temple masters taught Chinese culture and language as part of the curriculum, a method termed Gozan Zen. He was given the name Shuken, and learned about Chinese poetry, art and literature.

=== Training and enlightenment ===
When Ikkyū turned thirteen he entered Kennin-ji in Kyoto to study Zen under a well known priest by the name of Botetsu. Here Ikkyū began to write poetry frequently that was non-traditional in form. He was openly critical of Kennin-ji's leadership in his poetry, disheartened with the social stratum and lack of zazen practice he saw around him. In 1410, at the age of sixteen, Ikkyū left Kennin-ji and entered the temple Mibu-dera, where an abbot named Seiso was in residence. He did not stay long, and soon found himself at Saikin-ji in the Lake Biwa region where he was the sole student of an abbot named Ken'o. It seemed Ikkyū had finally found a master that taught true Rinzai Zen as Ikkyū saw it. Ken'o was sporadic in his teaching style and was a strong believer in the supremacy of zazen. In 1414, when Ikkyū was 21, Ken'o died. Ikkyū performed funeral rites and fasted for seven days. In despair Ikkyū tried to kill himself by drowning himself in Lake Biwa, but was talked out of it from the shore by a servant of his mother.

Ikkyū soon found a new teacher in a master named Kaso at Zenko-an, a branch temple of Daitoku-ji. Kaso was much like Ken'o in his style. For years he worked hard on assigned kōan and made dolls for a local merchant in Kyoto. In 1418 Ikkyū was given Case 15 of the Mumonkan ("The Gateless Gate", a famous set of 49 kōan), known as "Tozan's Three (or 60?) Blows", which depicts Tozan becoming enlightened when Ummon rebukes him for wandering from one monastery to another. One day a band of blind singers performed at the temple and Ikkyū penetrated his kōan while engrossed in the music. In recognition of his understanding Kaso gave Shuken the Dharma name Ikkyū, which roughly means 'One Pause'.

In 1420, Ikkyū was meditating in a boat on Lake Biwa when the sound of a crow sparked satori. When Ikkyū told Kasō of his experience, Kasō replied, "This is the enlightenment of a mere arhat, you're no master yet." Ikkyū responded, "Then I'm happy to be an arhat, I detest masters." Thus, Kasō declared, "Ha, now you really are a master." Kasō confirmed Ikkyū's great enlightenment and granted him inka. However, when presented with his inka, Ikkyū threw it to the ground and stomped off. Kasō retained the inka for safekeeping, but when Ikkyū learned of this, he tore it to pieces. Later, when his disciples had it pieced back together, Ikkyū burned it completely.

Ikkyū came up against the jealousy of Yoso, a more senior student who eventually came to run the monastery. In Ikkyū's poems, Yoso appears as a character unhealthily obsessed with material goods, who sold Zen to increase the prosperity of the temple.

=== Vagabond ===
Ikkyū could sometimes be a troublemaker. Known to drink in excess, he would often upset Kaso with his remarks and actions to guests. In response, Kaso gave inka to Yoso and made him Dharma heir. Ikkyū quickly left the temple and lived many years as a vagabond. He was not alone, however, as he had a regular circle of notable artists and poets from that era. Around this time, he established a sexual relationship with a blind singer, Mori, who became the love of his later life.

Ikkyū strove to live Zen outside of formal religious institutions. However, the Ōnin War had reduced Daitokuji to ashes, and Ikkyū was elected to be its abbot late in life, a role he reluctantly took on. This firmly placed him at the head of one of the most important Zen institutions. However, Ikkyū refused to give formal sanction to any of his disciples, stating his intent thus: "I have never given inka to anyone. ... So if after I'm gone, someone comes claiming to have my inka, you should report him to the authorities and prosecute for criminal misconduct. That's why I'm telling everyone the facts by way of a written testament." Toward the end of his life, Ikkyū told his disciples:

After my death some of you will seclude yourselves in the forests and mountains to meditate, while others may drink saké and enjoy the company of women. Both kinds of Zen are fine, but if some become professional clerics, babbling about 'Zen as the way,' they are my enemies. I have never given an inka, and if anyone claims to have received such a thing from me, have him or her arrested!

In 1481, Ikkyū died at the age of 87 from acute ague.

== Sex as a form of Zen practice ==
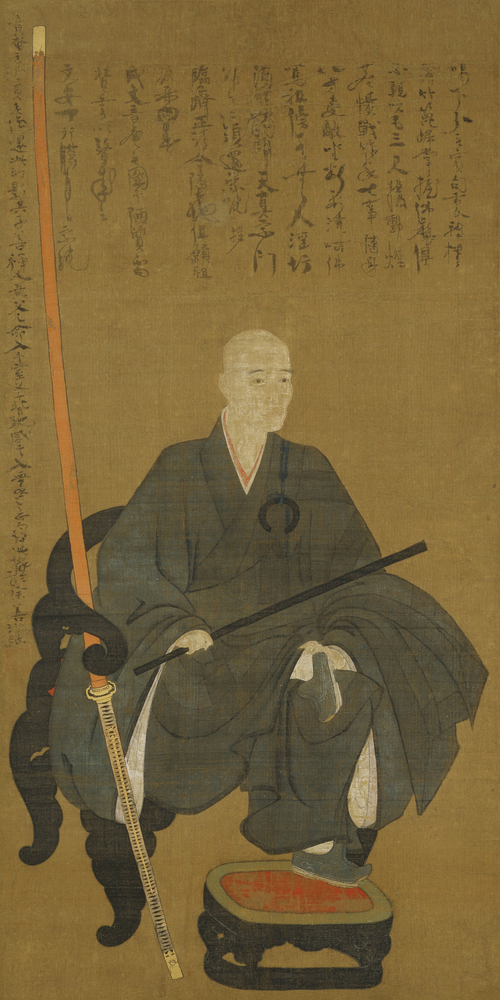
Portrait of Ikkyu in 1447.

Ikkyū felt a close connection with the Chinese Chan master Linji, for whom everyday ordinary activities expressed the buddha-nature. Linji said, "Shit and piss and just be human; when hungry, eat; when tired, sleep; make yourself the master of every situation!" According to Yanagida Seizan, this represents a recognition of the "fundamental value of the human being." Ikkyū was inspired by such an attitude, taking it to include sexual needs as well. "If you are thirsty," Ikkyū said, "you dream of water; if you are cold, you dream of a warm coat; as for me, I dream of the pleasures of the boudoir—that's my nature!" Ikkyū also took seriously Huineng's teaching that "outside of licentiousness, there is no true Buddha-nature." (Note: See also the following from Layman Pang: "Difficult, so difficult! Trying intentionally to get free of desire, you covet Nirvāna. You just seek the Pure Land everywhere else. If it's a question of true practice, you're not concerned with it. Uselessly striving, your coming and going is painful, Until at last you empty forms and return [home]. Easy, so easy! These very five skandhas make true Wisdom. The ten directions of the universe are the same One Vehicle. How can the formless Dharmakāya be two! If you cast off the passions to enter Bodhi, Where will any Buddha-lands be?") For Ikkyū, sex was a form of spiritual practice. He regarded sex in light of the nonduality of desire and bodhi, and it also served as a means for him to test his own sense of enlightenment as well. According to John Stevens, "For Ikkyū, the passions were the anvil on which true enlightenment is forged." That Ikkyū regarded sex as a religious rite is also exemplified by his insistence on wearing monk's robes when entering brothels. Ikkyū wrote that sex was better than sitting in meditation and working on koans:

Rinzai's disciples never got the Zen message,
But I, the Blind Donkey, know the truth:
Love play can make you immortal.
The autumn breeze of a single night of love is better than a hundred thousand years of sterile sitting meditation . . .

Stilted koans and convoluted answers are all monks have,
Pandering endlessly to officials and rich patrons.
Good friends of the Dharma, so proud, let me tell you,
A brothel girl in gold brocade is worth more than any of you.

Ikkyū frequented brothels as a means of deepening his satori and applying Zen to daily living. As Covell and Yamada point out, this resembles the tenth Ox-herding stage in which Hotei mingles freely with everyone, going beyond the duality between the saintly and common person. Ikkyū praised "pavilion girls" who, unlike priests whose minds were filled with philosophical dialectics, existed in a state of no-mind, facing the present moment immediately and without calculated thinking or regrets. This was to act free of the logically-structured mind. Ikkyū also came to embrace the view found in Esoteric Buddhism that the real Buddha is none other than one's own body. Thus, when he practiced Zen, he practiced with the body as well as the mind. Such a tantric attitude, which also draws on the language of alchemy, can be seen in the following:

A sex-loving monk, you object!
Hot-blooded and passionate, totally aroused.
But then lust can exhaust all passion,
Turning base metal into pure gold.

The lotus flower
Is not stained by the mud;
This dewdrop form,
Alone, just as it is,
Manifests the real body of truth.

== Legacy ==
Ikkyū is one of the most significant (and eccentric) figures in Zen history. To Japanese children, he is a folk hero, mischievous and always outsmarting his teachers and the shōgun. In addition to passed down oral stories, this is due to the very popular animated TV series Ikkyū-san.

In Rinzai Zen tradition, he is both heretic and saint. He was among the few Zen priests who addressed the subject of sexuality from a religious context, and he stood out for arguing that enlightenment was deepened by partaking in love and sex, including lovers, prostitutes and monastic homosexuality. He believed that sex was part of the human nature, and therefore purer than hypocritical organizations and worldly pursuits. At the same time, he warned Zen against its own bureaucratic politicising.

Usually he is referred to as one of the main influences on the Fuke sect of Rinzai zen, as he is one of the most famous flute player mendicants of the medieval times of Japan. The piece "Murasaki Reibo" is attributed to him. He is credited as one of the great influences on the Japanese tea ceremony, and renowned as one of medieval Japan's greatest calligraphers and sumi-e artists.

Ikkyū wrote in Kanbun-style classical Chinese, which was employed by many contemporary Japanese authors. For instance, the "Calling My Hand Mori's Hand" poem.

我手何似森手
自信公風流主
發病治玉茎萌
且喜我会裏衆

Translation:

My hand, how it resembles Mori's hand.
I believe the lady is the master of loveplay;
If I get ill, she can cure the jeweled stem.
And then they rejoice, the monks at my meeting.

Ikkyū is also connected with a Hell Courtesan, who became his disciple.

== In popular culture ==
- Toei Animation produced the historical comedy anime series Ikkyū-san (一休さん) based on Ikkyū's recorded early life at Ankoku-ji Temple, originally airing on TV Asahi from October 15, 1975, to June 28, 1982. The anime was directed by Kimio Yabuki and written by Makoto Tsuji, Tadaki Yamazaki, Hisao Okawa, Tatsuo Tamura, Hiroyasu Yamaura and Keisuke Fujikawa. The series was received by all ages in Japan and throughout Asia. In 1976, a theatrical film released was released as part of the Toei Manga Matsui film festival in the summer of that year.
- In the anime OVA Read or Die, a clone of Ikkyū appears as the leader of the villains, all of whom are also clones of famous historical figures.
- In the second edition of the book On the Warrior's Path, author Daniele Bolelli refers to Ikkyū as his "hero and philosophical role model". He also explored Ikkyū's life story in a chapter of his 50 Things You're Not Supposed to Know: Religion, and in two episodes of the podcast History on Fire.
- The Japanese manga author Hisashi Sakaguchi wrote a life story of Ikkyū, あっかんべェ一休, 'Ikkyu', or 'Akkanbe Ikkyu', more or less according to the popular stories about him. The manga has been translated in four volumes into Catalan, Spanish, French, German, Italian and Portuguese.
- In the manga Afterschool Charisma, a clone of Ikkyū appears among the main body of classmates in a special school filled with clones of famous historical figures.
- Comic author Tom Robbins identifies Ikkyū as his "idol".
- Kleenex Girl Wonder wrote the song "Don't Cry, Ikkyu" about Ikkyū.
- Wednesday Campanella's song and PV "Ikkyu-san".

== See also ==
- Buddhism in Japan
- List of Rinzai Buddhists
- Puhua
- Divine madness
- Nyönpa

== Sources ==
- On the Warrior's Path, Daniele Bolelli, Blue Snake Books, 2008.
- The Possible Impossibles of Ikkyu the Wise, I.G. Reynolds, 1971, Macrae Smith Company, Philadelphia, Trade SBN: 8255-3012-1.
- Ikkyu and the Crazy Cloud Anthology, Sonja Arntzen, 1987, University of Tokyo Press, ISBN 0-86008-340-3.
- Unraveling Zen's Red Thread: Ikkyu's Controversial Way, Dr. Jon Carter Covell and Abbot Sobin Yamada, 1980, HollyM International, Elizabeth, New Jersey, ISBN 0-930878-19-1.
- Wild Ways: Zen Poems of Ikkyu, translated by John Stevens, published by Shambhala, Boston, 1995.
- Crow with No Mouth, versions by Stephen Berg, published by Copper Canyon Press, WA, 2000. ISBN 1-55659-152-7.
- Steiner, Evgeny. Zen-Life: Ikkyu and Beyond. Cambridge Scholars Publishing, 2014. ISBN 978-1-4438-5400-9.
