= Five Mountain System =

System of organizing Chan/Zen Buddhist temples in China and Japan

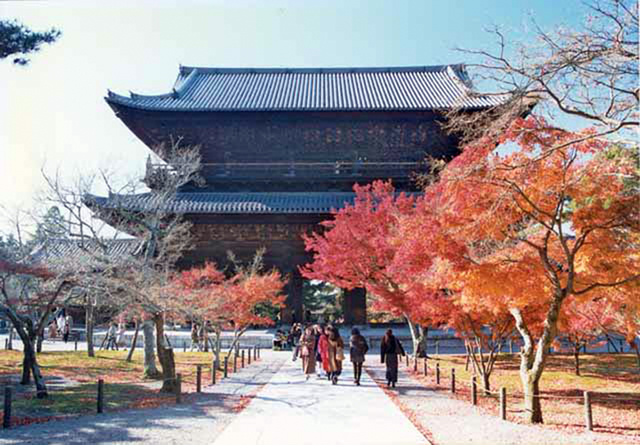
Kyoto's Nanzen-ji was the supervisor of the whole Five Mountain System in Japan.

The Five Mountains and Ten Monasteries System (五山十刹制度, Chinese: Wushan Shicha, Japanese: Gozan Jissetsu Seido) system, more commonly called simply Five Mountain System, was a network of state-sponsored Chan Buddhist temples created in China during the Southern Song dynasty (1127–1279), and was also later adopted for temples which specialized in scriptural Buddhist traditions, such as Tiantai Buddhism and Huayan Buddhism. This system was also later implemented primarily for Rinzai Zen temples in Japan during the late Kamakura period (1185–1333). The system originated in India before being adopted by China and Japan. The term "mountain" in this context means "temple" or "monastery", and was adopted because the traditional name for monastics was mountain monks as many monasteries were built on isolated mountains.

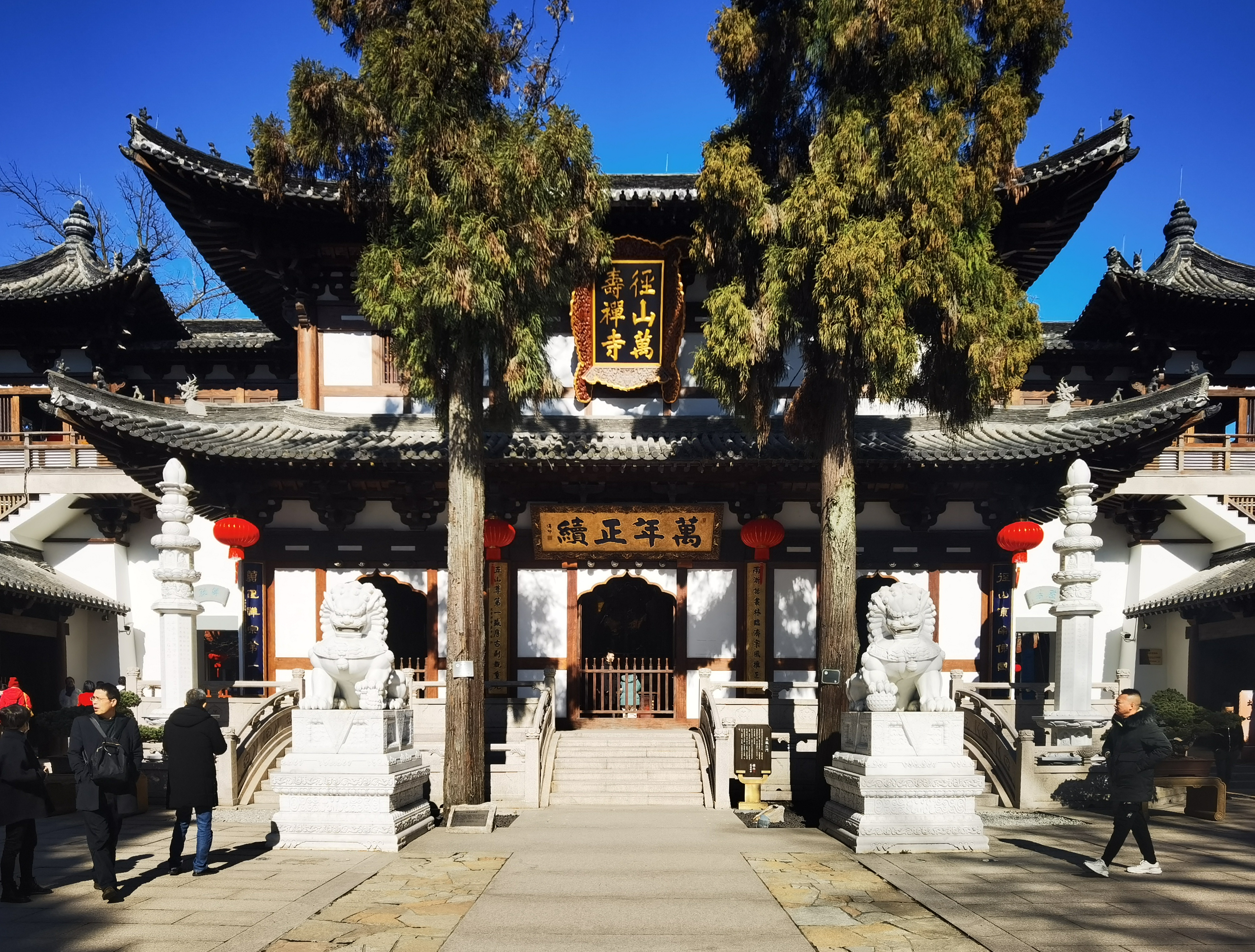
The shanmen of Jingshan Temple in Hangzhou, which was the highest ranking temple out of the Five Mountain temples in China.

In China, records by the Ming dynasty (1368–1644) historian Song Lian state that the Five Mountains system was first established during the Jiading period (1208–1224) of the Southern Song by Emperor Ningzong at the request of the official Shi Miyuan (who was a follower of the eminent Chan master Dahui Zonggao), although alternative accounts of the creation of the system exists in other records. The main Five Temples, known as Wushan (五山), were selected around the then temporary Southern Song capital of Lin'an (located around modern-day Hangzhou in Zhejiang), and high-ranking monks were appointed as abbots by imperial order on a rotating basis. Immediately below the five Wushan temples are another ten called the Shicha (十刹). This list of categorizations was continued in succeeding dynasties, and separate rankings exist for both the Chan Buddhist tradition and the scriptural Buddhist tradition (which broadly includes traditions like Tiantai and Huayan).

In Japan, the ten existing "Five Mountain" temples (five in Kyoto and five in Kamakura, Kanagawa) were both protected and controlled by the shogunate. Japan’s adoption of Zen Buddhism from Song and Yuan China was most clearly reflected in the establishment of the Five Mountain (Gozan 五山) system of state-sponsored Zen temples, which closely imitated the Chinese model. In time, they became a sort of governmental bureaucracy that helped the Ashikaga shogunate stabilize the country during the turbulent Nanboku-chō period. Below the ten Gozan temples there were ten so-called Jissetsu (十刹) temples, followed by another network called Shozan (諸山, lit. many temples). The terms Gozan and Five Mountain System are used both for the ten temples at the top and for the Five Mountain System network in general, including the Jissetsu and the Shozan.

There used to be in Kamakura a parallel "Five Mountain System" of nunneries called Amagozan (尼五山), of which the famous Tōkei-ji is the only survivor.

== China ==
=== Establishment ===
At the time of the Song dynasty, Chan (Japanese Zen) was the dominant form of monasticism in China and had considerable imperial support. This forced it to assume certain features and develop a network of monastic offices and rituals wanted by the state. Around the 12th century, this tendency to monastic wealth and imperial patronage became even more pronounced with the creation by direct imperial order in South China of the Five Mountains and Ten Temples System (五山十刹, wushan shicha) during the late Southern Song (1127–1279). Historical records by the historian Song Lian (1310–1381) state that the Five Mountains system was first established during the Jiading period (1208–1224) of the Southern Song by Emperor Ningzong at the request of the official Shi Miyuan (1164–1233). It was a system of state-sponsored temples and monasteries built to pray to the gods for the dynasty and the state, which was threatened by enemies from Northern China. Officials chose both the five temples of the top tier, and the chief monastic that ruled over them.

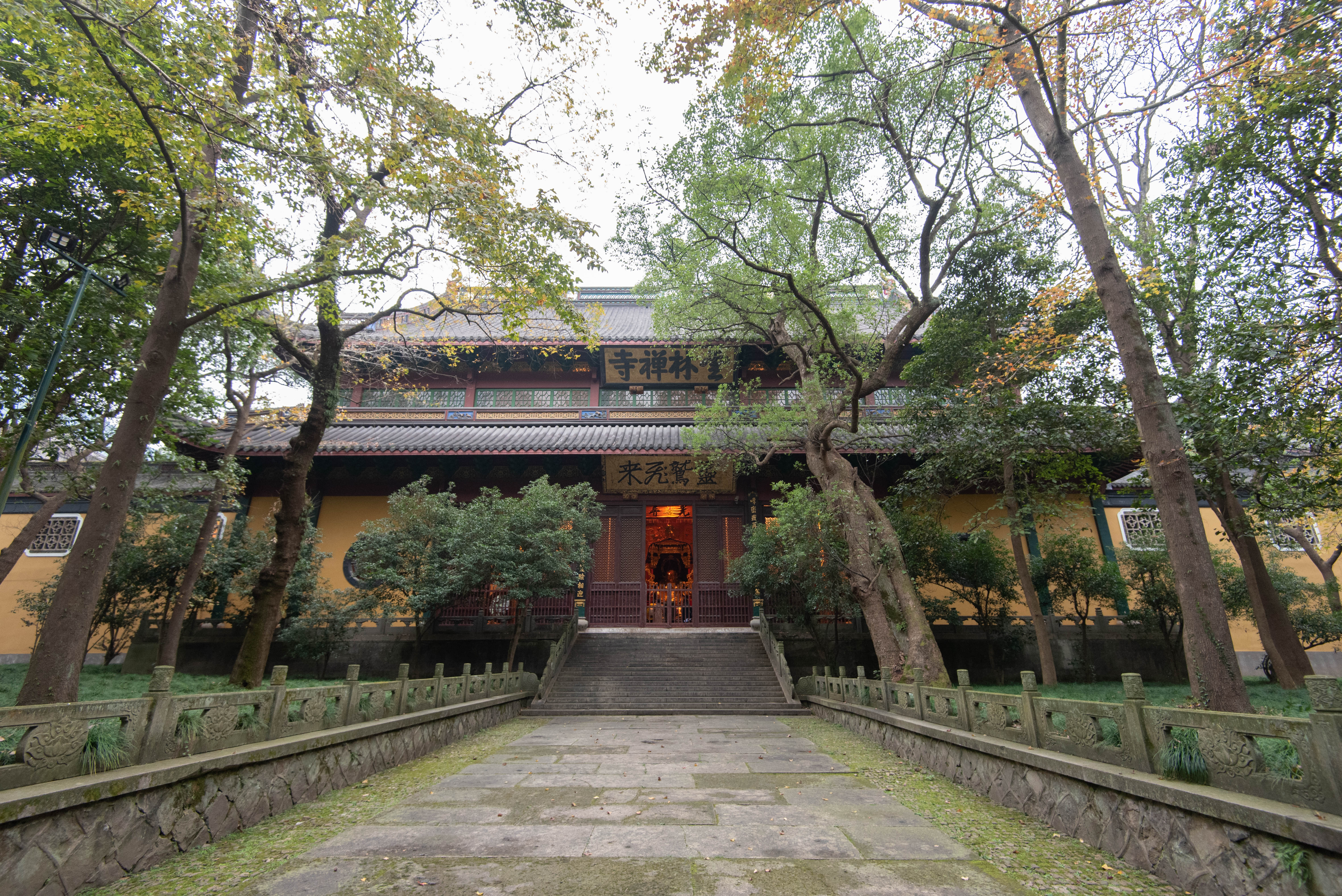
The Tianwang Hall at Lingyin Temple in Hangzhou, which is the second temple on the Five Mountains system ranking for Chan Buddhist temples.

=== Rankings for Chan temples ===
The famous five mountains and ten temples with regards to Chan Buddhism are:

Five Mountains (五山, Wushan)	First Rank	Jingshan Temple (徑山寺, Jingshan si) in Hangzhou
Five Mountains (五山, Wushan)	Second Rank	Lingyin Temple (靈隱寺, Lingyin si) in Hangzhou
Five Mountains (五山, Wushan)	Third Rank	Tiantong Temple (天童寺, Tiantong si) in Ningbo
Five Mountains (五山, Wushan)	Fourth Rank	Jingci Temple (净慈寺, Jingci si) in Hangzhou
Five Mountains (五山, Wushan)	Fifth Rank	Ayuwang Temple (阿育王寺, Ayuwang si) in Ningbo
Ten Temples (十刹, Shicha)	First Rank	Fajing Temple (法净寺, Fajing si), also known as Zhong Tianzhu Temple (中天竺寺, Zhong tianzhu si), in Hangzhou
Ten Temples (十刹, Shicha)	Second Rank	Wanshou Chan Temple (萬壽禪寺, Wanshou chan si) in Huzhou
Ten Temples (十刹, Shicha)	Third Rank	Linggu Temple (靈谷寺, Linggu si) in Nanjing
Ten Temples (十刹, Shicha)	Fourth Rank	Bao'en Temple (報恩寺, Bao en si) in Suzhou
Ten Temples (十刹, Shicha)	Fifth Rank	Xuedou Temple (雪竇寺, Xuedou si) in Ningbo
Ten Temples (十刹, Shicha)	Sixth Rank	Jiangxin Temple (江心寺, Jiangxin si) in Wenzhou
Ten Temples (十刹, Shicha)	Seventh Rank	Chongsheng Temple (崇聖寺, Chongsheng si) in Fujian
Ten Temples (十刹, Shicha)	Eighth Rank	Shuanglin Temple (雙林寺, Shuanglin si) in Wenzhou
Ten Temples (十刹, Shicha)	Ninth Rank	Yunyan Temple (雲岩寺, Yunyan si) in Suzhou
Ten Temples (十刹, Shicha)	Tenth Rank	Guoqing Temple (國清寺, Guoqing si) on Mount Tiantai

=== Rankings for scriptural Buddhist temples ===
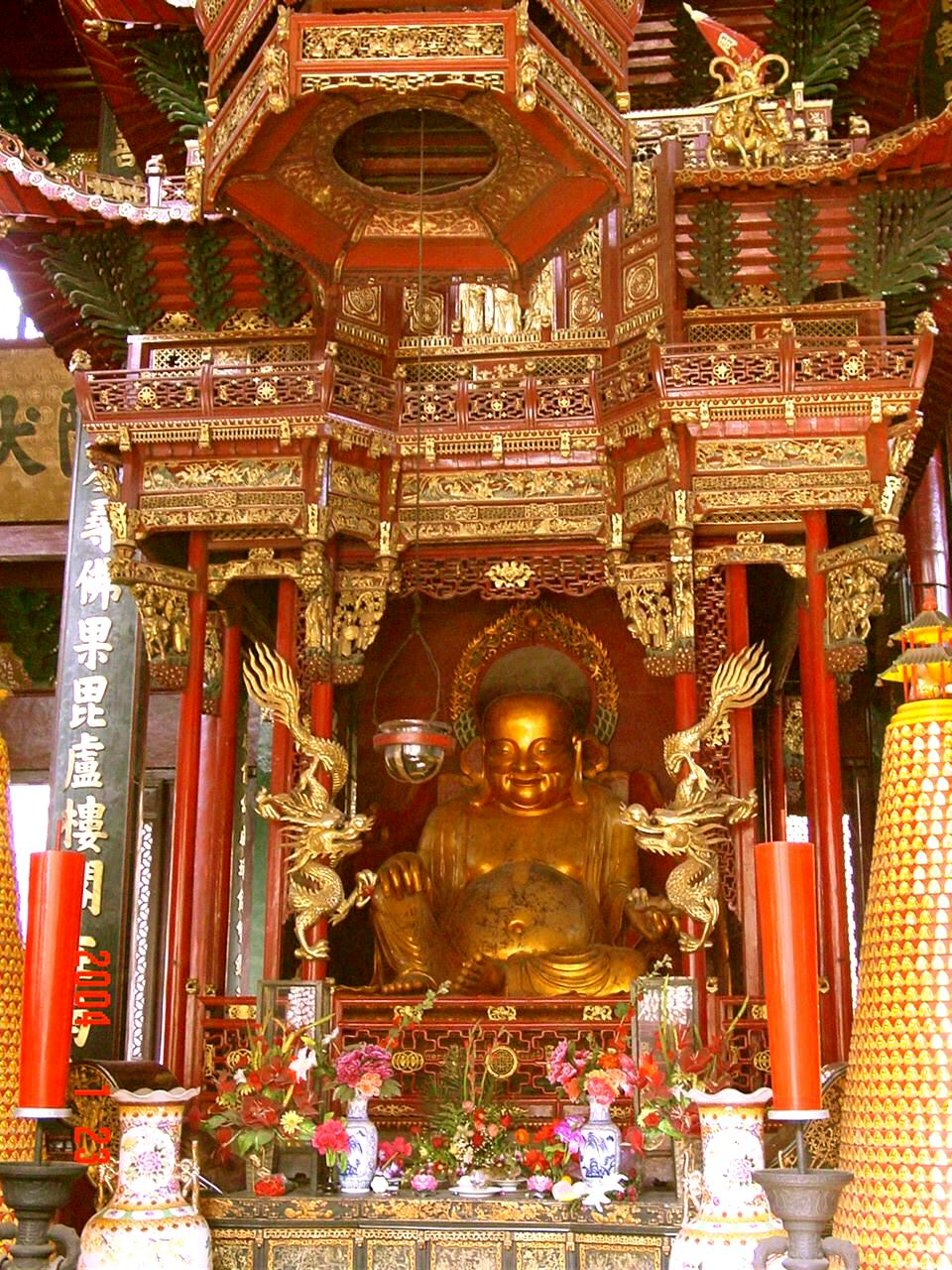
Statue of the eminent monk Budai, who is traditionally regarded as an emanation of Mi Le Fo, at the shanmen of Faxi Temple in Hangzhou, which is the first temple in the Five Mountains system ranking for Jiao temples.

Temples under the Song dynasty were broadly categorized into three classes based on their specializations: Chan (禪, lit: "dhyana"), Jiao (教, lit: "teachings") and Lü (律, lit: "Vinaya"), where the Jiao class encompassed various Buddhist traditions based heavily on scriptures such as Tiantai and Huayan. A similar Five Mountains system of ranking was also applied to temples under the Jiao class:

Five Mountains (五山, Wushan)	First Rank	Faxi Temple (法喜寺, Faxi si), also known as Shang Tianzhu Temple (中天竺寺, Shang tianzhu si), in Hangzhou
Five Mountains (五山, Wushan)	Second Rank	Fajing Temple (法鏡寺, Lingyin si), also known as Xia Tianzhu Temple (下天竺寺, Xia tianzhu si), in Hangzhou
Five Mountains (五山, Wushan)	Third Rank	Nengren Temple (能仁寺, Nengren si) in Wenzhou
Five Mountains (五山, Wushan)	Fourth Rank	Yanqing Temple (延慶寺, Yanqing si) in Ningbo
Five Mountains (五山, Wushan)	Fifth Rank	Unknown
Ten Temples (十刹, Shicha)	First Rank	Jiqing Chan Temple (集慶禪寺, Jiqing chan si) in Hangzhou
Ten Temples (十刹, Shicha)	Second Rank	Chongsheng Yanfu Temple (崇恩演福寺, Chongsheng yanfu si) in Hangzhou
Ten Temples (十刹, Shicha)	Third Rank	Pufu Temple (普福寺, Pufu si) in Hangzhou
Ten Temples (十刹, Shicha)	Fourth Rank	Cigan Temple (慈感寺, Cigan si) in Suzhou
Ten Temples (十刹, Shicha)	Fifth Rank	Puji Temple (普濟寺, Xuedou si) on Mount Putuo
Ten Temples (十刹, Shicha)	Sixth Rank	Huxin Temple (湖心寺, Huxin si) in Wenzhou
Ten Temples (十刹, Shicha)	Seventh Rank	Dashan Temple (大善寺, Dashan si) in Fujian
Ten Temples (十刹, Shicha)	Eighth Rank	Bei Temple (北寺, Bei si) in Wenzhou
Ten Temples (十刹, Shicha)	Ninth Rank	Yanshou Temple (延壽寺, Yunyan si) in Shanghai
Ten Temples (十刹, Shicha)	Tenth Rank	Waguan Temple (瓦棺寺, Guoqing si) in Nanjing

=== Monastic codes ===
The system was devised specifically to bureaucratize and control the power of the Chan temples, a power which had been growing with the years and worried the central government. The consequent submission of the Chan network to imperial power and its goals is evident in later codes, particularly in the Baizhang qinggui compiled in 1336. Because the conquering Mongols financially supported Chan, the code emphasizes prayers for the emperor and the monastic ancestors. The emperor is even described as a nirmanakaya, or incarnate Buddha. The complex monastic bureaucracy described by the code clearly reflects the imperial administration with its eastern and western ranks. The code has been in continuous use ever since, and not only within Chan Buddhism.

== Japan ==
During the Song dynasty (960–1279) and Yuan dynasty (1279–1368), China developed influential Zen Buddhist institutions and cultural practices that profoundly shaped Japan during the Kamakura (1180–1333) and Muromachi (1336–1573) periods. Japan continuously sent monks on pilgrimages to China to not only study Zen teachings and acquire religious text but also to understand Zen temple architecture and systems. The Five Mountain System established in Japan was a direct imitation of the system established by the Song government in China.

Introduced to Japan by the Hōjō regency, after an initial hostility from older and established Buddhist sects, it prospered thanks to the support of the country's military rulers in Kamakura first and Kyoto later. In the final version of the system, Kamakura's Five Mountains were, from the first-ranked to the last, Kenchō-ji, Engaku-ji, Jufuku-ji, Jōchi-ji and Jōmyō-ji. Kyoto's Five Mountains, created later by the Ashikaga shogunate after the collapse of the Kamakura regime, were Tenryū-ji, Shōkoku-ji, Kennin-ji, Tōfuku-ji and Manju-ji. Above them all was the huge Nanzen-ji temple. Below the top tier there was a nationwide capillary network of smaller temples that allowed its influence to be felt everywhere.

=== Function ===
The system was adopted to promote Zen in Japan however, in Japan as it had already happened in China, it was controlled and used by the country's ruling class for its own administrative and political ends. The Gozan system allowed the temples at the top to function as de facto ministries, using their nationwide network of temples for the distribution of government laws and norms, and for the monitoring of local conditions for their military superiors. The Hōjō first, and the Ashikaga later were therefore able to disguise their power under a religious mask, while monks and priests worked for the government as translators, diplomats and advisers. To the Rinzai sect, the collaboration with the shogunate brought wealth, influence and political clout.

=== History ===
The system had come to Japan at a time when Kamakura's five great Zen temples were already known as the Five Mountains, and it unified in one organization all the great temples of the dominant Zen schools of the time. It thus institutionalized a large and very important part of the Rinzai school, bringing to it the protection, but also the control of the state. The whole network of temples was supervised by a state bureaucracy created specifically for the task.

The system in its final form had three tiers, with at the top Kyoto's Five Mountains (the Kyoto Gozan (京都五山), known in English also as Kyoto's Five Zen Temples) and Kamakura's Five Mountains (the Kamakura Gozan (鎌倉五山), in a subordinate position). Below them were the so-called Ten Temples, or Jissetsu, with at the bottom other temples collectively known as Shozan.

The Gozan temples were dominated mainly by the Rinzai Zen schools. The Kōchi-ha (宏智派) branch of the Sōtō Zen school however belonged to the Gozan system too.

Under their masters' patronage, the Five Mountain temples gradually became centers of learning and developed a characteristic literature called the Japanese Literature of the Five Mountains. During this time, its scholars exerted a far-reaching influence on the internal political affairs of the country. The system put great value in a strong orientation towards Chinese Zen, Chinese philosophy and Chinese literature. The organization's scholars had a close relationship with the Ming imperial dynasty, had a pervasive influence in many cultural fields and played an important role in importing Neo-Confucianism (particularly as far as the shushigaku (朱子学) is concerned) from China to Japan.

==== Birth of the Gozan ====
At the end of the Kamakura period (1333) the four temples of Kennin-ji, Kenchō-ji, Engaku-ji and Jufuku-ji, were already known as the Gozan, but not much is otherwise known about the system, its structure and the hierarchical order.

The first official recognition of the system came from Emperor Go-Daigo during the brief Kenmu Restoration (1333–1336). Go-Daigo added the Kyoto Gozan to the existing temples in Kamakura with Daitoku-ji and Nanzen-ji together at the top as number 1, followed by Kennin-ji and Tōfuku-ji. At this point in time, in spite of their name, the Gozan were not five but four in both cities. At the beginning of Muromachi period, they became five in Kyoto later, when Ashikaga Takauji built Tenryū-ji in memory of Go-Daigo.

==== Early ranking system ====
The first explicit formulation of a clear Gozan ranking system dates to the year 1341.

First Rank	Kenchō-ji, Kamakura
First Rank	Nanzen-ji, Kyōto
Second Rank	Engaku-ji, Kamakura
Second Rank	Tenryū-ji, Kyōto
Third Rank	Jufuku-ji, Kamakura
Fourth Rank	Kennin-ji, Kyōto
Fifth Rank	Tōfuku-ji, Kyōto
Subtemple (or jun-gozan)	Jōchi-ji, Kamakura

The system was modified again many times according to the preferences of the government and of the Imperial Household.

==== Ankoku-ji ====
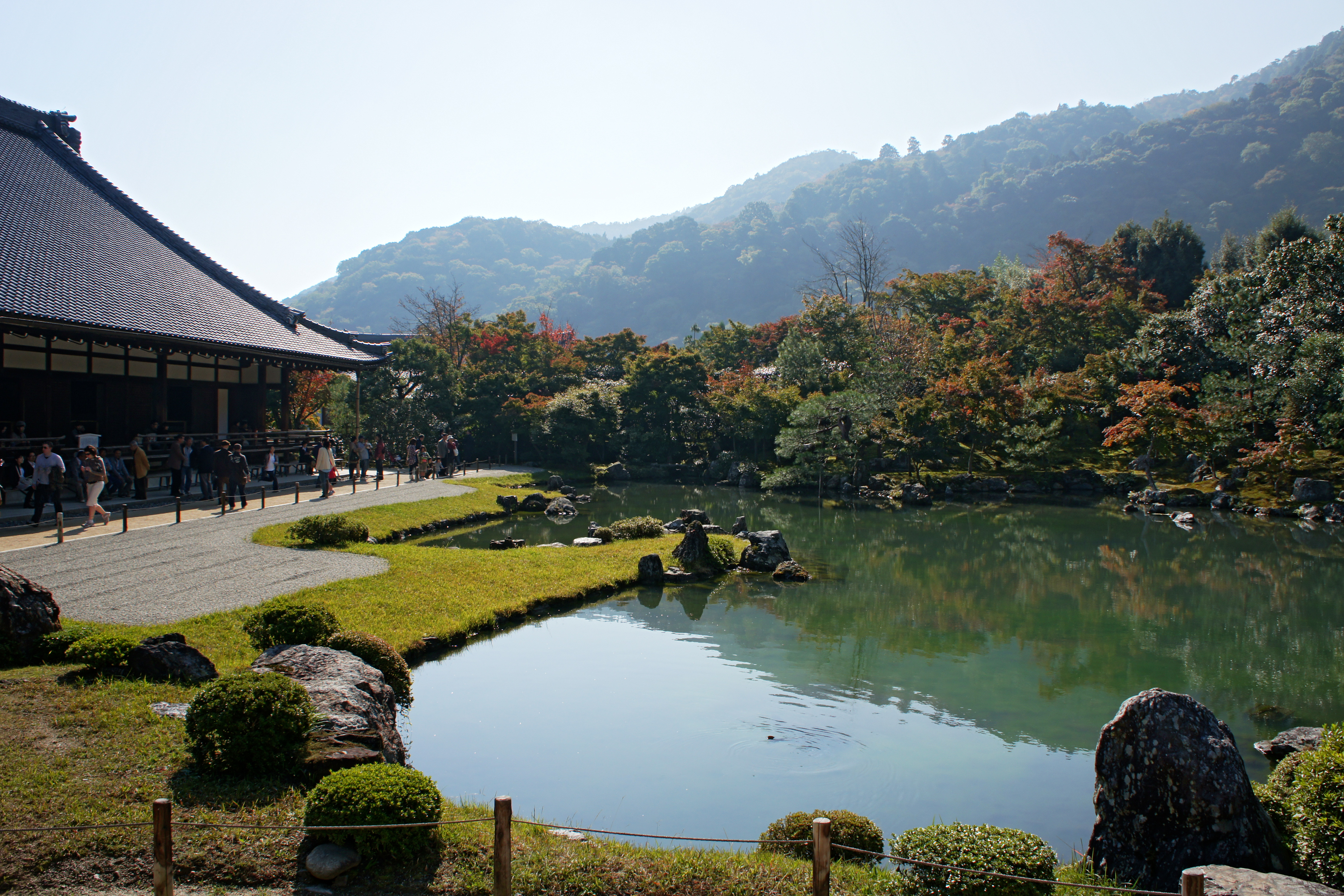
The zen garden that Musō Soseki built at Tenryū-ji, head of the Kyoto Gozan

From their base cities of Kamakura and Kyoto, the twin Five Mountains Systems had great influence over the entire country. Following the advice of Musō Soseki, shōgun Ashikaga Takauji and his brother Ashikaga Tadayoshi decided to strengthen the system through the building in every province of an Ankoku-ji (安国寺, Temple for National Pacification) and a Rishō-tō (利生塔, Pagoda for the welfare of sentient beings).

These were dedicated to the memory of the dead of the Genkō War of 1331–3, war in which Emperor Go-Daigo broke the power of the Hōjō clan. Emperor Kōgon promulgated in 1345 an edict for the deployment of the new system, and from 1362 to 1367 the temples and the pagodas were built in 66 provinces.

The Ankoku-ji network was tightly controlled by Ashikaga shugo (Governors) and was associated with the Gozan system. The Rishō-tō were direct property of the Gozan, with the exception of those associated with the Ashikaga, which were connected to powerful temples of non-Rinzai schools, mainly of the Shingon, Tendai and Risshū sects.

Both brothers died early (Tadayoshi in 1352, according to the Taiheiki of poisoning, and Takauji in 1358 of cancer), so they couldn't oversee the system's creation until its end.

The system was completed under Ashikaga Yoshimitsu when he was 10 years old. During his father Ashikaga Yoshiakira's regency, who was until his death busy with the war with the Southern Court, the Ashikaga governors had become however strong and independent warlords. Even though as a consequence the provinces didn't accept any more the oversight of the Gozan and of the shogunate, the Gozan/Ankoku-ji system remained a valuable instrument to control the various Zen sects.

==== Gozan ====
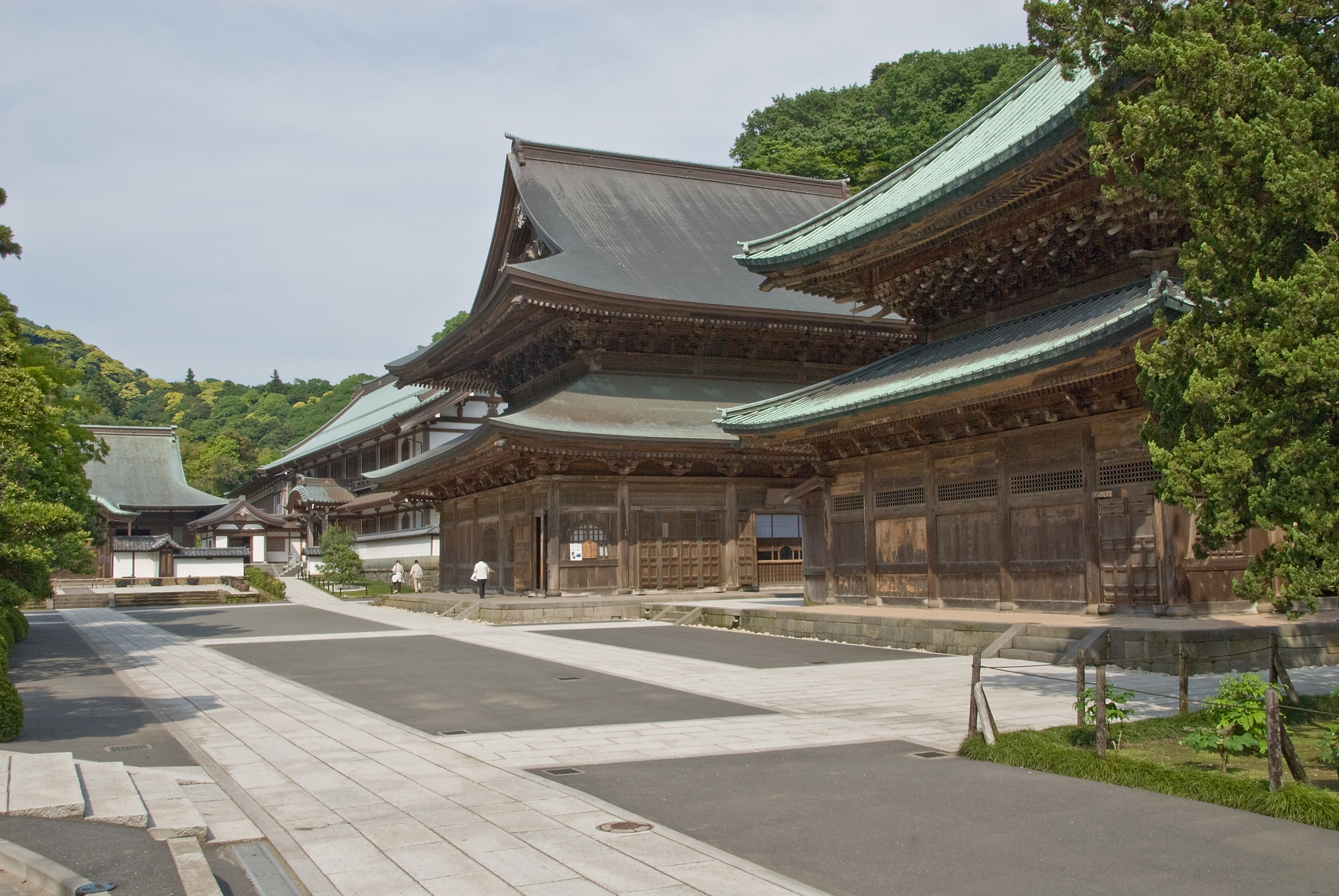
The garan at Kenchō-ji, head of the Kamakura Gozan

After the completion of Shōkoku-ji by Yoshimitsu in 1386 a new ranking system was created with Nanzen-ji at the top and in a class of its own. Nanzen-ji had the title of "First Temple of The Land" and played a supervising role.

Nanzen-ji
	Kyoto	Kamakura
First Rank	Tenryū-ji	Kenchō-ji
Second Rank	Shōkoku-ji	Engaku-ji
Third Rank	Kennin-ji	Jufuku-ji
Fourth Rank	Tōfuku-ji	Jōchi-ji
Fifth Rank	Manju-ji	Jōmyō-ji

This structure then remained more or less unchanged for the rest of the system's history.

==== Jissetsu ====
The Jissetsu, second tier of the Five Mountain system, was created to be hierarchically under the Gozan, but developed slowly towards an independent system. The temples of this rank were in general powerful institutions of great prestige and had to help the military government financially and in other ways.

During the Kenmu restoration temples like Jōmyō-ji in Sagami Province and Manju-ji (万寿寺) in Bungo Province were already part of the system, which is therefore assumed to have been born during the late Kamakura period. Nothing else is known however about the character and structure of the system at the time. In 1341 the system included Jōmyō-ji, Zenkō-ji (禅興寺), Tōshō-ji and Manju-ji in Sagami province, Manju-ji, Shinnyō-ji (真如寺), and Ankoku-ji (安国寺) in Yamashiro Province, Chōraku-ji (長楽寺) in Kōzuke Province, Shōfuku-ji (聖福寺) in Chikuzen Province and Manju-ji in Bungo.

After many changes, in 1386 the system was divided in half between the Kantō Jissetsu, that is the temples under the Kamakura Gozan, and the Kyoto Jissetsu, that is the temples under the Kyoto Gozan.

The Kyoto Jissetsu were then Tōji-in (等持院), Rinsen-ji (臨川寺), Shinnyō-ji (真如寺), Ankoku-ji (安国寺), Hōdō-ji (宝幢寺), Fumon-ji (普門寺), Kōkaku-ji (広覚寺), Myōkō-ji (妙光寺), Daitoku-ji (大徳寺) and Ryūshō-ji (竜翔寺).

The Kantō Jissetsu were Zenkō-ji (禅興寺), Zuisen-ji (瑞泉寺), Tōshō-ji (東勝寺), Manju-ji (万寿寺), Taikei-ji (大慶寺), Zenpuku-ji (善福寺), and Hōsen-ji (法泉寺) in Sagami, plus Kōsei-ji (興聖寺) in Mutsu Province, Tōzen-ji (東漸寺) in Musashi Province and Chōraku-ji (長楽寺) in Kōzuke.

Later, the term Jissetsu lost its original meaning and became just a rank. Consequently, at the end of the Middle Ages it included over 60 temples.

==== Shozan ====
The third and lowest tier was that of the so-called Shozan, sometimes also called kassatsu, kōsatsu or kassetsu (甲刹) as the corresponding tier of the Chinese state-sponsored temple system. These last terms are however normally used only in writing for elegance. The term in China meant "first in rank" in a certain province, but in Japan this meaning was lost.

We know that in 1321 Sagami province's Sūju-ji (崇寿寺) and in 1230 Higo Province's Jushō-ji (寿勝寺) were part of the system, which therefore must be older. More temples from all parts of the country were added later during the Kemmu restoration. Unlike the Gozan and the Jissetsu, the Shozan were not ordered hierarchically and there were no limits to their number, which consequently grew until more than 230 temples belonged to the system. A Zen chief priest (a jūji (住持)) in his career would usually rise from the Shozan to the Jissetsu and finally to the Gozan.

== Rinka ==
Apart from the Gozan temples, there were also many others in the provinces called Rinka (林下, the forest below), among them Sōtō's Eihei-ji founded by Dōgen, and Rinzai's Daitoku-ji, Myōshin-ji and Kōgen-ji, which were not under the direct control of the state. During Japan's Middle Ages, the Rinka monasteries were Zen's other main branch. Unlike the Five Mountain temples, they placed little emphasis on Chinese culture, were run by less well-educated monks who preferred zazen and kōan to poetry. Rinka Zen prospered among the lower layers of the warrior, merchant and peasant castes, who saw religion as a means to achieve simple worldly goals such as profits and exorcisms.

The very lack of political connection which had hampered them at the beginning of their history was however the reason why they prospered later. During the slow decline of Ashikaga authority, and particularly after the catastrophic Ōnin war, in the latter half of the Muromachi period, because the Rinka had a close relationship with local warlords, they became progressively more important and influential than the Gozan, which followed their Ashikaga masters in their decline. A measure of the success of the Rinka is given by the fact that today's Sōtō and Rinzai sects emerged from Rinka Zen.
