= Jōmyō-ji =

Buddhist temple in Kamakura, Kanagawa, Japan

Jōmyō-ji 浄妙寺
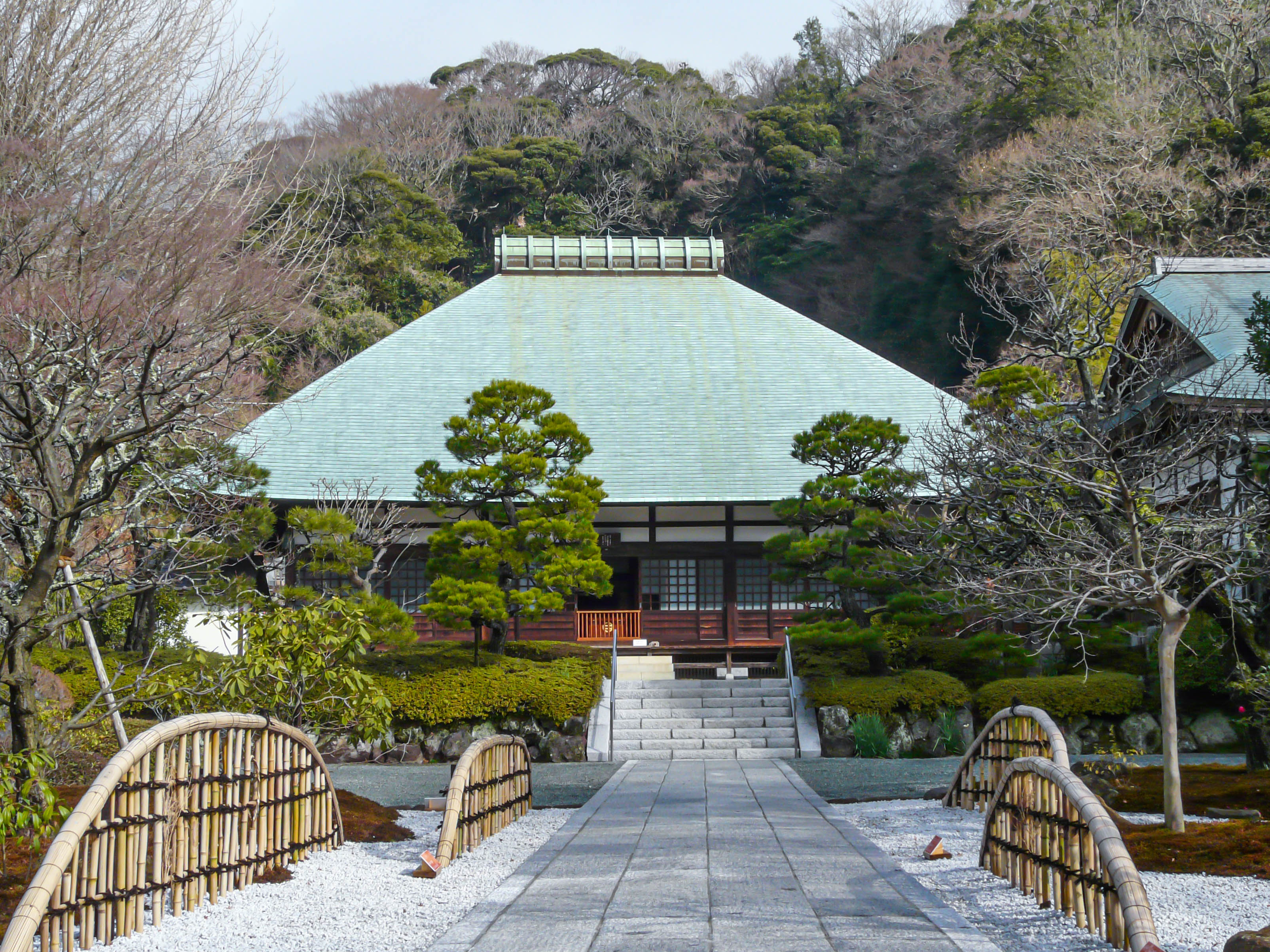
- Main Hall

Religion
- Affiliation: Kenchō-ji Rinzai
- Deity: Shaka Nyorai (Śākyamuni)
- Status: Five Mountain Temple (Kamakura)

Location
- Location: 3-chōme-8-31 Jōmyōji, Kamakura, Kanagawa Prefecture
- Country: Japan
- Interactive map of Jōmyō-ji 浄妙寺
- Coordinates: 35°19′22.2″N 139°34′16.7″E

Architecture
- Founder: Ashikaga Yoshikane and Taikō Gyōyū
- Completed: 1188

Tōkasan Jōmyō Zenji (稲荷山浄妙寺) is a Zen Buddhist temple of the Rinzai sect, Kenchō-ji school, in Kamakura, Kanagawa Prefecture, Japan. Jōmyō-ji is Number Five of the five temples known as Kamakura Gozan ("Kamakura's Five Mountains"), and the only one of the five not founded by a member of the Hōjō clan. Jōmyō-ji has instead, as nearby Zuisen-ji, deep ties with the Ashikaga clan, and was one of the family's funeral temples (bodaiji). For this reason the family's kamon, or crest, is ubiquitous on its premises. The first three characters of its full name mean "Inari mountain", presumably from the hill of the same name where it stands, in its turn named after an ancient Inari myth (see below). Jōmyō-ji has given its name to the surrounding area, the characters for which have been however deliberately changed from 浄妙寺 to 浄明寺.

== History ==
Jōmyō-ji was founded in 1188 by priest Taikō Gyōyū 退耕行勇 (1163–1241) as a Mikkyō temple with the name Gokuraku-ji but, soon after the first Japanese Zen monastery, nearby Kenchō-ji, was founded in 1253, the temple's head priest Geppō Ryōnen changed its denomination to Rinzai and its name to the present one. The date when this happened is not known exactly, but it is thought to lie between 1257 and 1288. Ashikaga Sadauji, father of future shōgun Ashikaga Takauji, was Jōmyō-ji's sponsor and, with his help, it quickly grew in size and importance. (The temple's name actually derives from Jōmyōjiden, Sadauji's posthumous name.) We know for example that in 1323, fifty of Jōmyō-ji priests participated at a ceremony in memory of Hōjō Sadatoki and that at the time the temple was ranked tenth for importance in Kamakura. According to the Taiheiki, at the end of his life Ashikaga Tadayoshi was imprisoned and then poisoned here.

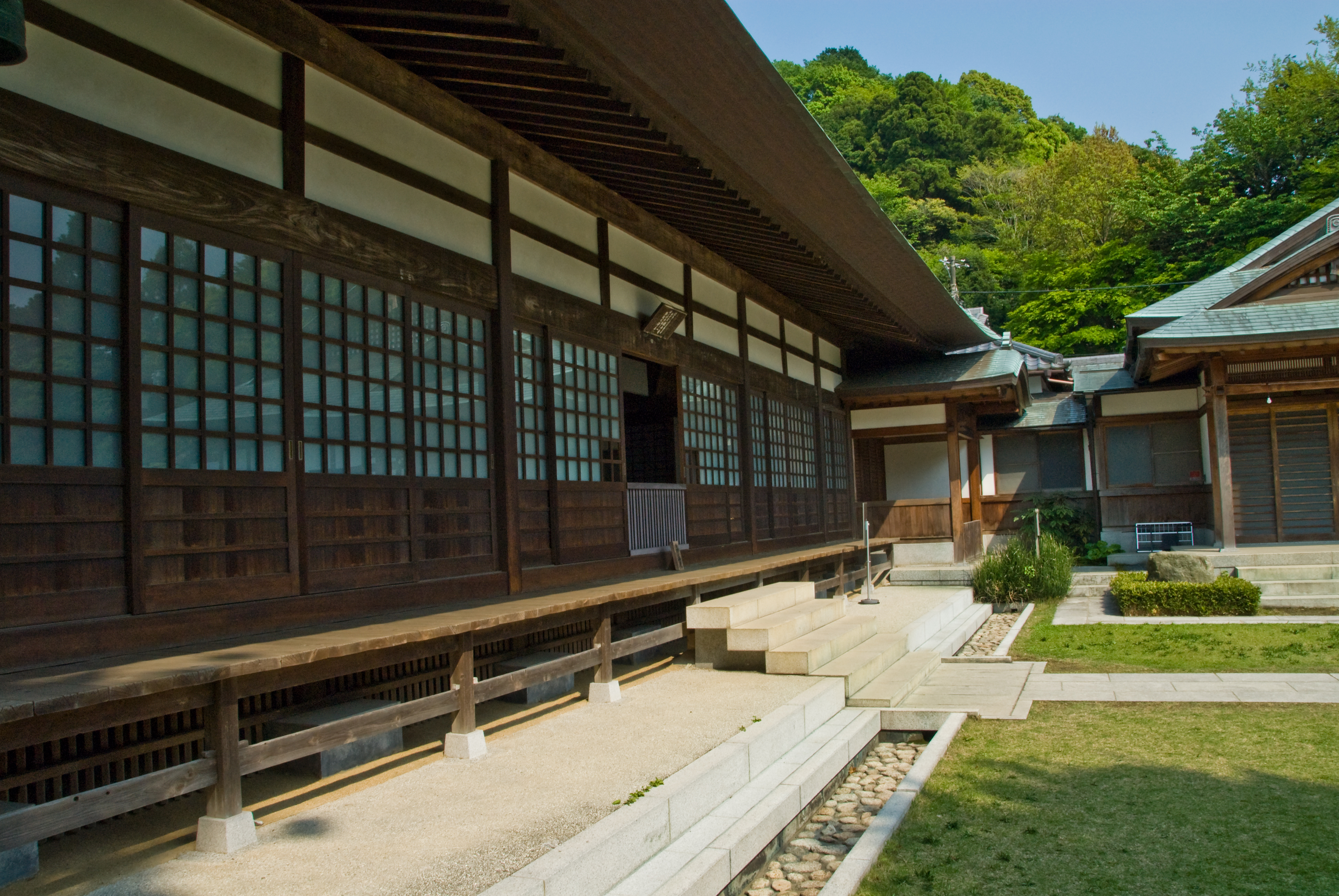
Jōmyō-ji's Main Hall (Hondō)

In the second half of the 14th century shōgun Ashikaga Yoshimitsu in Kyoto formally established the network of Zen temples called Five Mountain System (Gozan seido in Japanese) to help the shogunate rule the country. Jōmyō-ji was fifth of the Kamakura Gozan, the five temples which presided over the system's Kantō sector, and was given facilities worthy of its status, including over 20 subtemples (塔頭, tacchū). However, in 1438 Kamakura Kubō Ashikaga Mochiuji rebelled against Kyoto's shogunate, was defeated and was forced to kill himself to avoid capture. After his death, Kamakura's decline, which had started when shōgun Ashikaga Takauji had decided to move his capital to Kyoto, accelerated further, and the Kamakura Gozan followed the city into obscurity and neglect. When poet Gyōe in the summer of 1487 visited the temple, found it invaded by grasses and moss. During the turbulent Sengoku period Jōmyō-ji, as the city in general, was to suffer a lot of violence and destruction.

== Points of interest ==
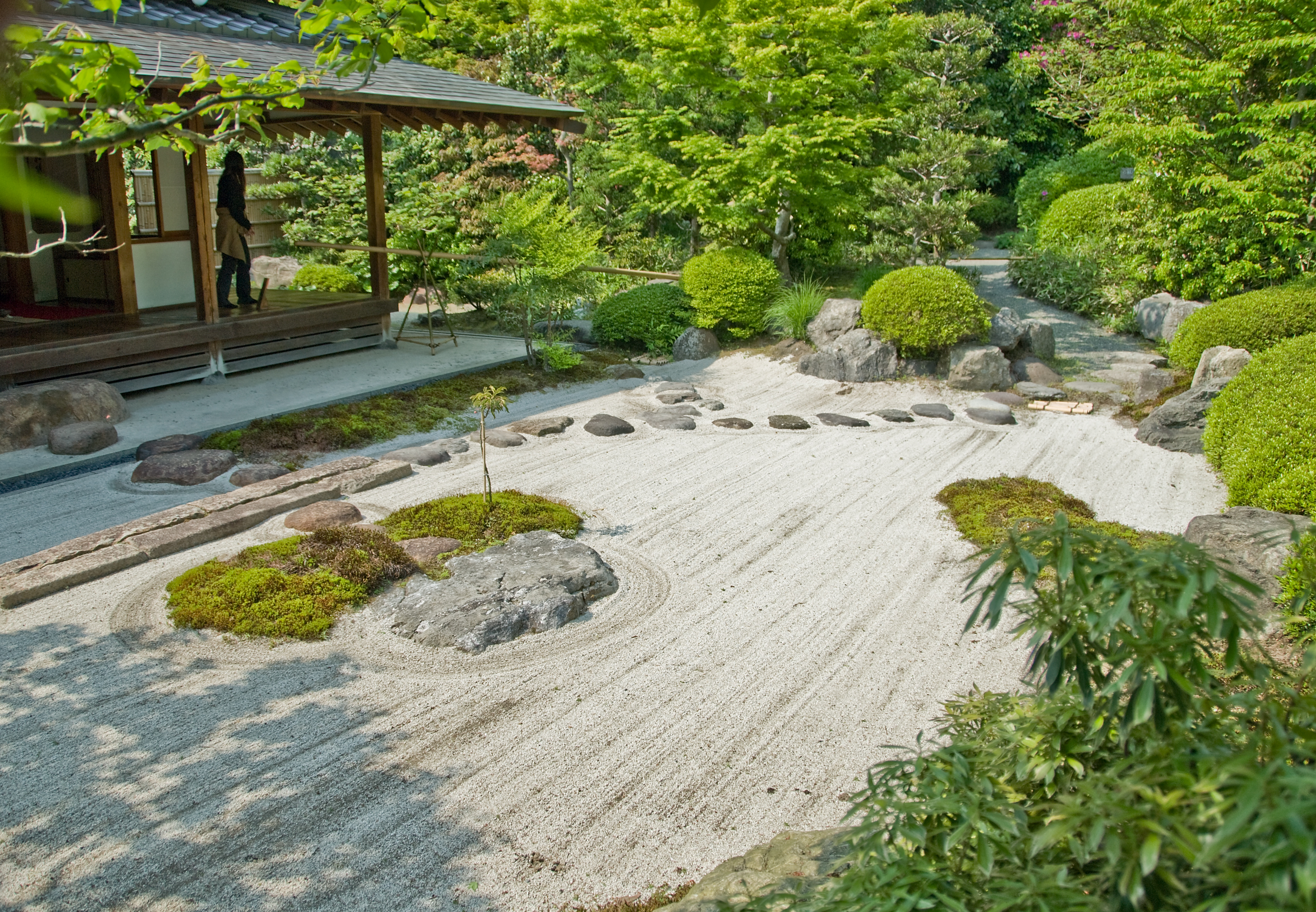
The Kisen-an tea house and the Zen garden

For the role it had in the area's history, Jōmyō-ji has been declared a National Historical Site.

After the main gate (sanmon) in the middle of the temple's large garden stands the Main Hall (the Hon-dō, see photo above). Its structure is however not that of a typical Zen Butsuden, but rather that of an 8×6 bay (間, ken) hōjō (chief priest's living quarters) with raised floors. Destroyed by fire in 1748, it was rebuilt in 1754 using in part original Muromachi period timber salvaged from the old edifice. The main object of worship is a seated figure of Shaka Nyorai carved in wood during the Nanboku-chō period. The temple also owns a seated figure of founding priest Taikō Gyōyū (the temple's only Important Cultural Property), a statue of goddess Shō-Kannon, another of Fujiwara no Kamatari (an ancestor of the Fujiwara clan), and one of Kōjin, the god of the kitchen and cooking. The hōkyōintō in the cemetery behind the Hon-dō is said to be Ashikaga Sadauji's grave, but the attribution has been questioned by scholars because of the date it bears, sixty years after Sadauji's recorded date of death. The temple includes a recently restored tea house called Kisen-an (喜泉庵) where monks used to meet to have tea, but which is now open to the public. In front of the tea house lies a karesansui, or Zen rock garden. On the premises there is also a restaurant and bakery owned and operated by the temple itself. Near the temple can be found the ruins of Daikyū-ji (大休寺), Ashikaga Tadayoshi's family temple (he was often called Daikyū-dono (大休殿)) where he was buried after he died.

=== The origins of the name Kamakura ===
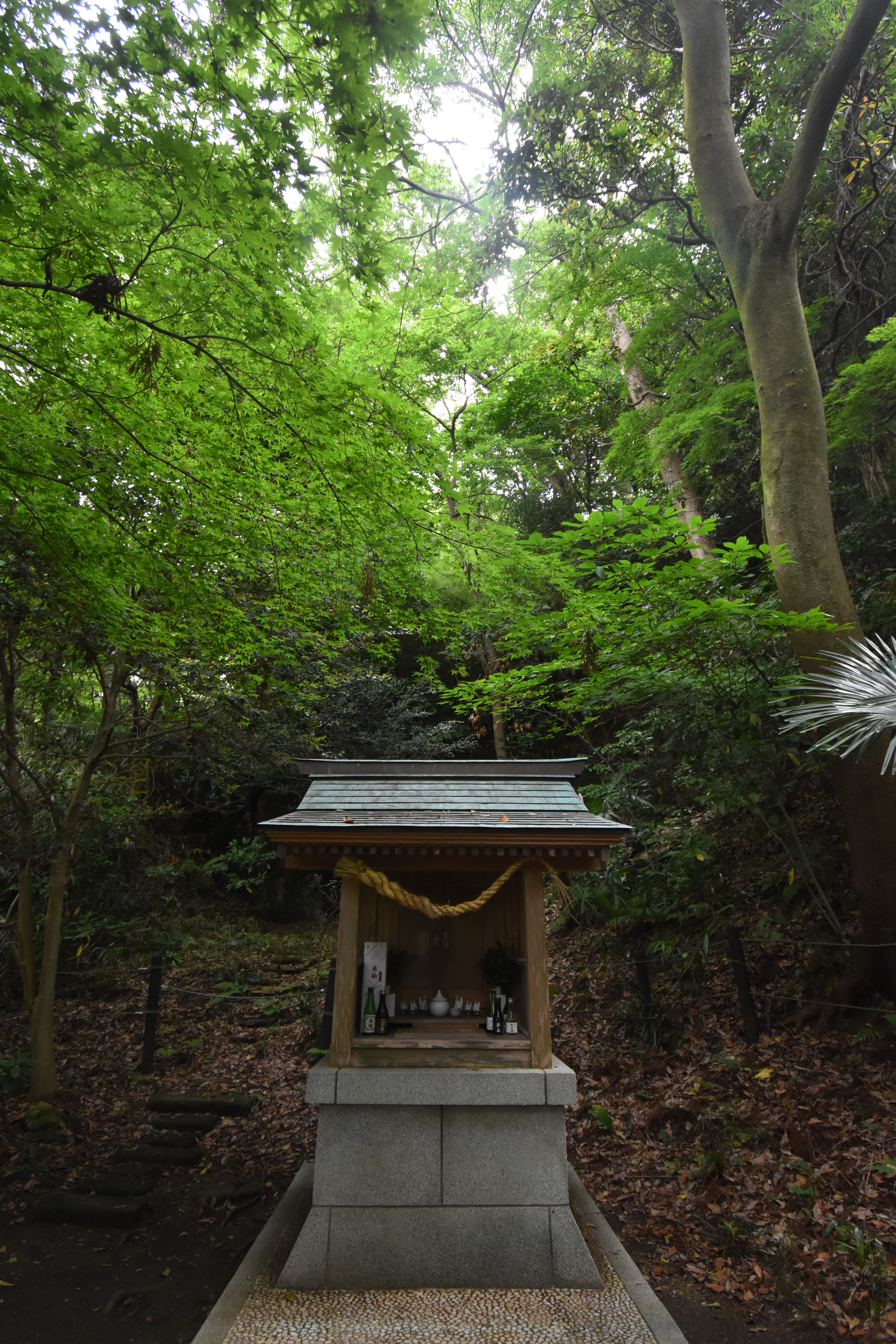
Kamatari Inari Shrine.

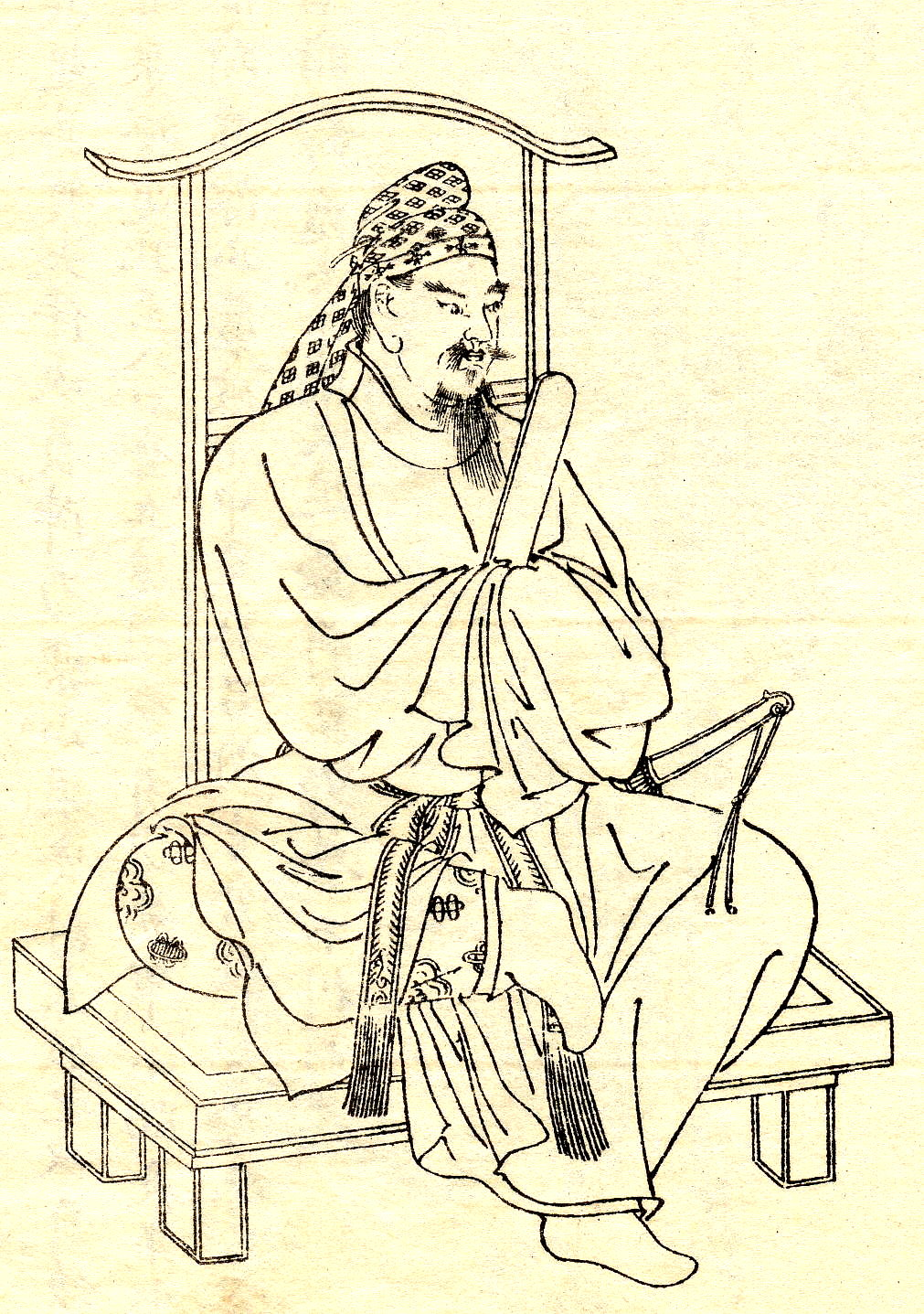
Fujiwara no Kamatari

On the hill behind the temple lies a small shrine called Kamatari Inari Shrine (鎌足稲荷神社, Kamatari Inari Jinja) which, in spite of its insignificant appearance, is of a certain historical importance both because of its age (it dates back to the seventh century) and its role in a legend related to Kamakura's name.

The plaque next to the shrine explains that kami Inari gave young Fujiwara no Kamatari a sickle which would magically protect him as long as it was in his possession. In 645 AD, having defeated Soga no Iruka, Kamatari came to the Kantō and there he dreamed of Inari, who told him: "I gave you the sickle to protect you, but now that you have achieved your goal of defeating Iruka, you must give it back to me and to the land."

Kamatari buried the sickle, and on the spot was erected the shrine that carries his name. According to the same legend, the name Kamakura means "the place where Kamatari buried his sickle".
