= Musō Soseki =

Japanese Zen-Buddhist teacher and landscape architect

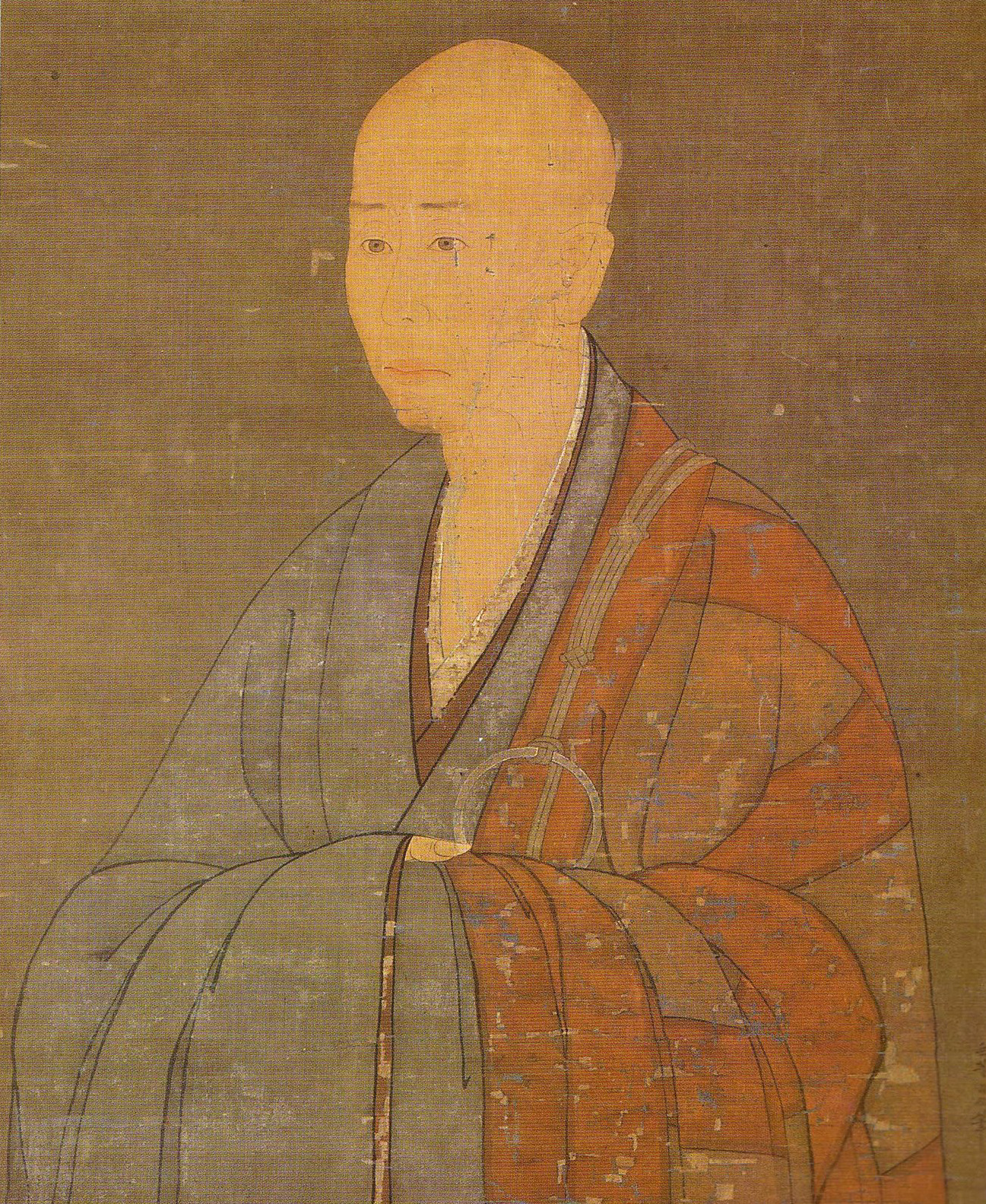
Portrait of Musō Soseki by Mutō Shūi (無等 周位), 14th century

Musō Soseki (夢窓 疎石; 1275 – October 20, 1351) was a Rinzai Zen Buddhist monk and teacher, and a calligrapher, poet and garden designer. The most famous monk of his time, he is also known as Musō Kokushi (夢窓国師; "national [Zen] teacher Musō"), an honorific conferred on him by Emperor Go-Daigo. His mother was the daughter of Hōjō Masamura (1264–1268), seventh Shikken (regent) of the Kamakura shogunate.

== Biography ==
Originally from Ise Province, now part of modern-day Mie Prefecture, Soseki was a ninth-generation descendant of Emperor Uda. At the age of four he lost his mother and was therefore put in the temple of Hirashioyama under the guidance of priest Kūa. He entered a mountain temple in 1283, where he studied the Shingon and Tendai sects of Buddhism. In 1292 he took his vows at Tōdai-ji in Nara, and was given the name Chikaku. In 1293 he dreamed that, while visiting two temples in China called in Japanese Sozan (疎山) and Sekitō (石頭) he was given a portrait of Daruma Daishi (the introductor of Chan Buddhism in China, commonly called Zen Buddhism in English) and told to keep it safe. When he awoke, he concluded that Zen must be his destiny, so he converted and went to study Zen at Kennin-ji Temple in Kyoto under Muin Enpan (無隠円範), Kōhō Kennichi (高峯顕日; 1241–1316), and others. For the most part, however, he practiced alone. Kennichi confirmed Soseki's enlightenment after a period of time. Later, in remembrance of the dream, he composed a new name for himself, forming his family name from characters meaning dream and window, and his given name from the first characters of the names of the two temples appearing in his dream; it was this new name, Musō Soseki, by which he was to become famous.

In 1325 Emperor Go-Daigo requested that he come to Kyoto to become head priest of the great temple of Nanzen-ji. The following year he founded Zen'o-ji in his native Ise He was later invited by Kamakura's regent Hōjō Takatoki so, the following year, after establishing a temple in Ise province he went to Kamakura and stayed at Jōchi-ji and Engaku-ji. In 1327 with Nikaidō Dōun's support he founded Zuisen-ji, a temple destined to become an important cultural center in the region. Afterwards, he stayed at Kyūkō-ji in Kōchi Prefecture. He acquired creeds from both Hōjō Takatoki and Hōjō Sadaaki. After the fall of the Kamakura shogunate, he was ordered by the Emperor Go-Daigo to go back to Kyoto, where he founded Saihō-ji and Rinkawa-dera. It was in this period that he was given by imperial decree the name Musō Kokushi.

In 1345 of Muromachi period, he founded Tenryū-ji in Kyoto, that is his most important work. After that, six years passed, and he died.

== Musō Soseki and the Ashikaga ==
After Go-Daigo's Kenmu Restoration failed and Ashikaga Takauji became shōgun, like many other men of his time Soseki switched sides. He was ambitious and sensitive to power shifts, so he allied himself with the Ashikaga brothers, becoming their intimate and serving them well. He stayed with them for the rest of his long life, enjoying the support of both the shōgun and his brother Tadayoshi, who played a pivotal role in his career. Musō helped the two Ashikaga organize a network of Zen monasteries, the so-called Five Mountain System, and its subsidiary, the Ankoku-ji network of temples, across Japan. This helped create a national religious movement and solidify the shōgun's power. In 1339, at Go-Daigo's death he opened Tenryū-ji in Kyoto to ensure the Emperor a prosperous afterlife. The garden in front of the chief abbot's residence is one of his works, incorporating elements of the landscape in Arashiyama near Kyoto. It is considered evidence of his genius as a landscape designer.

Musō, together with Ashikaga Tadayoshi and a merchant named Shihon are considered responsible for the reopening of trade between Japan and Ming China. As a result of the trading mission, the construction of Tenryū-ji was completed. The Kyoto Five Mountain Zen temple network was being established.

== Musō Soseki's intellectual legacy ==
The temples of the Five Mountain System network of Zen temples were centers of learning of Confucian metaphysics, Chinese poetry, painting, calligraphy, printing, architecture, garden design, and ceramics, and as such have left an indelible mark on the country's history and culture. At the very center of their birth stands Musō Soseki. Soseki was an abbot at Zenrin-ji, Tenryū-ji, Zuisen-ji and many other temples. He taught Zen to a great number of disciples (the estimated number is over 10 thousand), also leaving an enormous body of poetry and other writings. One of his best known anthologies of zen teachings is Dream Conversations (夢中問答集, Muchū Mondō-shū). Among his students are Gidō Shūshin and Zekkai Chūshin, literary figures who had a central role in the development of the Japanese Literature of the Five Mountains.

Even though none survives in its original form, Soseki's Zen gardens have proven to be one of his most lasting contributions to the country's culture and image. To Soseki, designing new gardens and altering existing ones was an integral part of the practice of Zen.

Soseki died in 1351 at the age of 77. Because he was given, both before and after death, seven different honorific names (like Musō Kokushi (夢窓国師), Shōkaku Kokushi (正覚国師), and Shinshū Kokushi (心宗国師) calling him a national teacher by as many Emperors, he is known as "the Teacher to Seven Emperors" (七朝帝師, Nanachō Teishi).

== Gardens by Musō Soseki ==
The following is a list of gardens known to have been by Musō Soseki or attributed to him. However, whatever Soseki built was destroyed during the Ōnin War, and therefore any modern version is someone else's work. Soseki Muso introduced "Zanzanjosui" 残山剰水 into Japanese gardens. He also played a significant role in establishing karesansui枯山水, using the stonework to express an imaginary landscape rather than as a nature model.

- Saihō-ji, better known as Koke-dera in Kyoto – UNESCO World Heritage Site, and one of Japan's Special Places of Scenic Beauty
- Tenryū-ji in Kyoto – UNESCO World Heritage Site, and one of Japan's Special Places of Scenic Beauty
- Eihō-ji in Tajimi, Gifu Prefecture – One of Japan's Places of Scenic Beauty
- Erin-ji, in Yamanashi Prefecture – One of Japan's Places of Scenic Beauty
- Zuisen-ji in Kamakura – One of Japan's Places of Scenic Beauty
- Jōchi-ji
- Engaku-ji in Kamakura
- Tōnanzen-in in Kyoto
- Rinsen-ji in Kyoto
- Chikurin-ji in Kōchi
- Kakurinbo in Yamanashi

== See also ==
- Buddhism in Japan
- List of Rinzai Buddhists
