= Ankoku-ji (Fukuyama) =

Buddhist temple in Hiroshima Prefecture, Japan

Ankoku-ji 安国寺
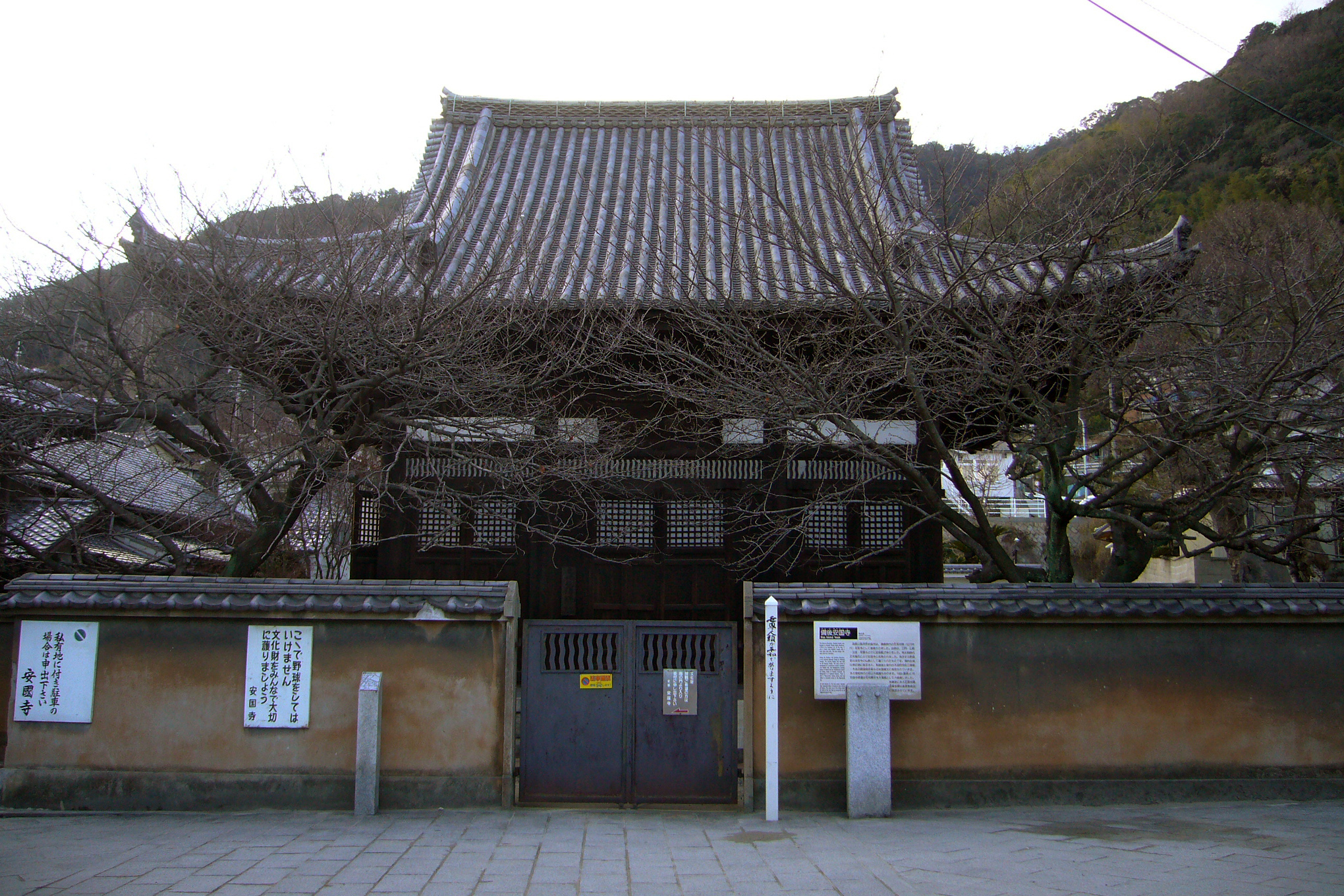
- Front of Ankoku-ji

Religion
- Affiliation: Rinzai Zen

Location
- Location: Fukuyama, Hiroshima Prefecture
- Country: Japan
- Interactive map of Ankoku-ji 安国寺

Architecture
- Completed: 1273

Ankoku-ji (安国寺) is a Buddhist temple of the Kokutai-ji branch of Rinzai school of Buddhism in Fukuyama, Hiroshima Prefecture, Japan. This temple was built by the priest Kakushin in 1273. Afterwards, it was revived by Ankokuji Ekei in 1579, though it remained in decline. This temple is classified as an Important Cultural Property.
