= Jōchi-ji =

Temple in Kamakura City, Kanagawa Prefecture, Japan

Jōchi-ji 浄智寺
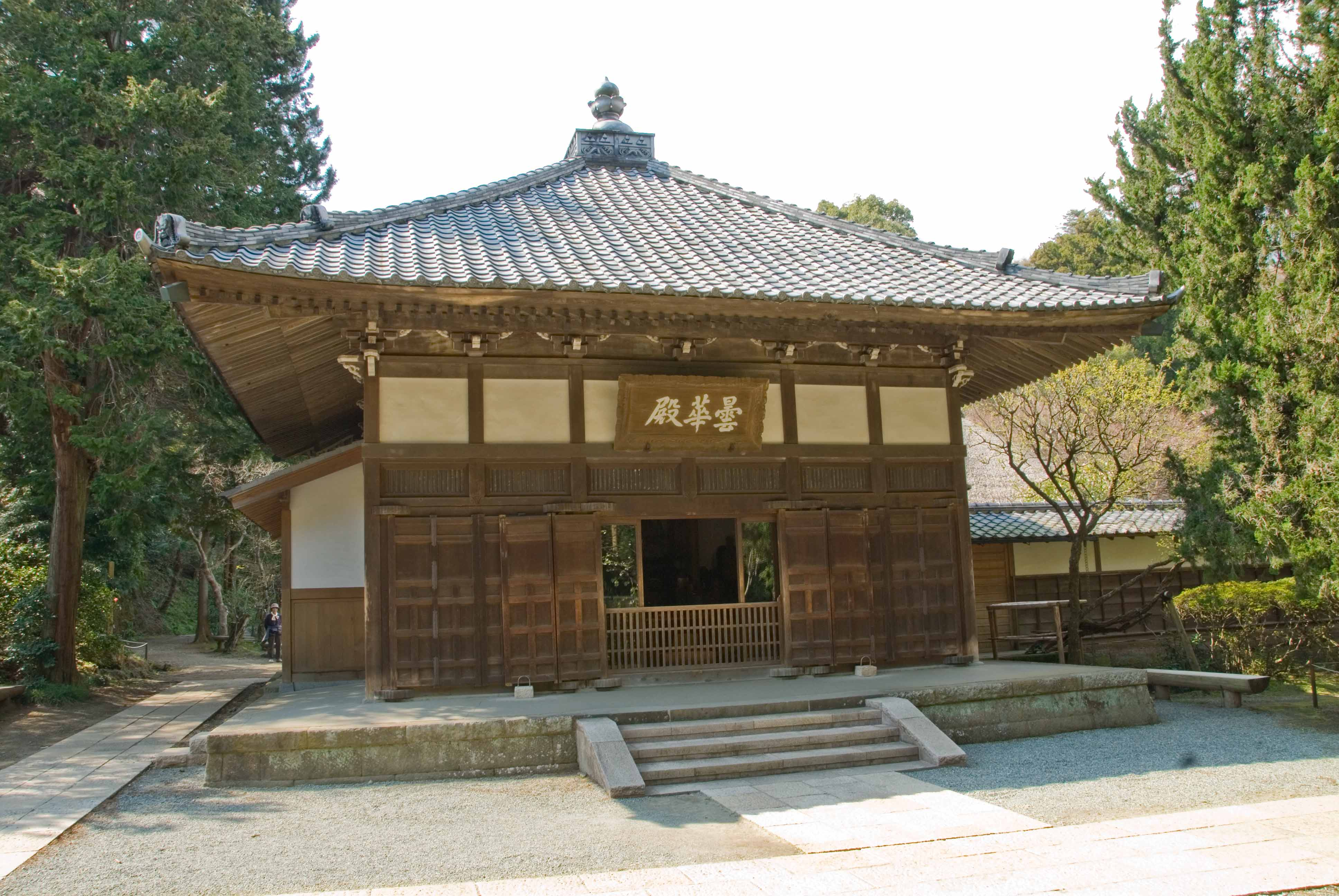
- Main Hall

Religion
- Affiliation: Engaku-ji Rinzai
- Deity: Amida Nyorai (Amitābha); Shaka Nyorai (Śākyamuni); Miroku Nyorai (Maitreya)
- Status: Five Mountain Temple (Kamakura)

Location
- Location: 1402 Yamanouchi, Kamakura, Kanagawa Prefecture
- Country: Japan
- Interactive map of Jōchi-ji 浄智寺
- Coordinates: 35°20′0.2″N 139°32′47″E

Architecture
- Founder: Hōjō Morotoki
- Completed: 20th century (Reconstruction)

Website
- https://jochiji.com/

Kinpōzan Jōchi-ji (金宝山浄智寺) is a Buddhist Zen temple in Kita-Kamakura, Kanagawa Prefecture, Japan. It belongs to the Engaku-ji school of the Rinzai sect and is ranked fourth among Kamakura's Five Mountains. The main objects of worship are the three statues of Shaka, Miroku, and Amida Nyorai visible inside the main hall.

== History ==
Officially, the temple was founded in 1283 by Hōjō Munemasa (1253–1281) (son of the fifth Shikken Hōjō Tokiyori) and his son Hōjō Morotoki (1275–1311). The construction work was under the advisory of Chinese monks and retains the architectural style of the Song dynasty.

Priest Nanshu Kōkai (a.k.a. Shin’o Zenji) was invited to open the temple but, feeling too young and not up to the task, he asked the Hōjōs to nominate Gottan Funei and Daikyu Shonen, both Chinese Zen masters that had come to Japan invited by Hōjō Tokiyori. The temple has therefore the distinction of having three official founding priests.

However, starting from the middle of the 15th century, the temple gradually fell into disrepair in line with the decline of the city of Kamakura itself, and although it maintained eight sub-temples until the end of the Edo period, most of the temple's structures were destroyed in the 1923 Great Kantō earthquake. The temple was rebuilt after the Showa era.

== Points of interest ==
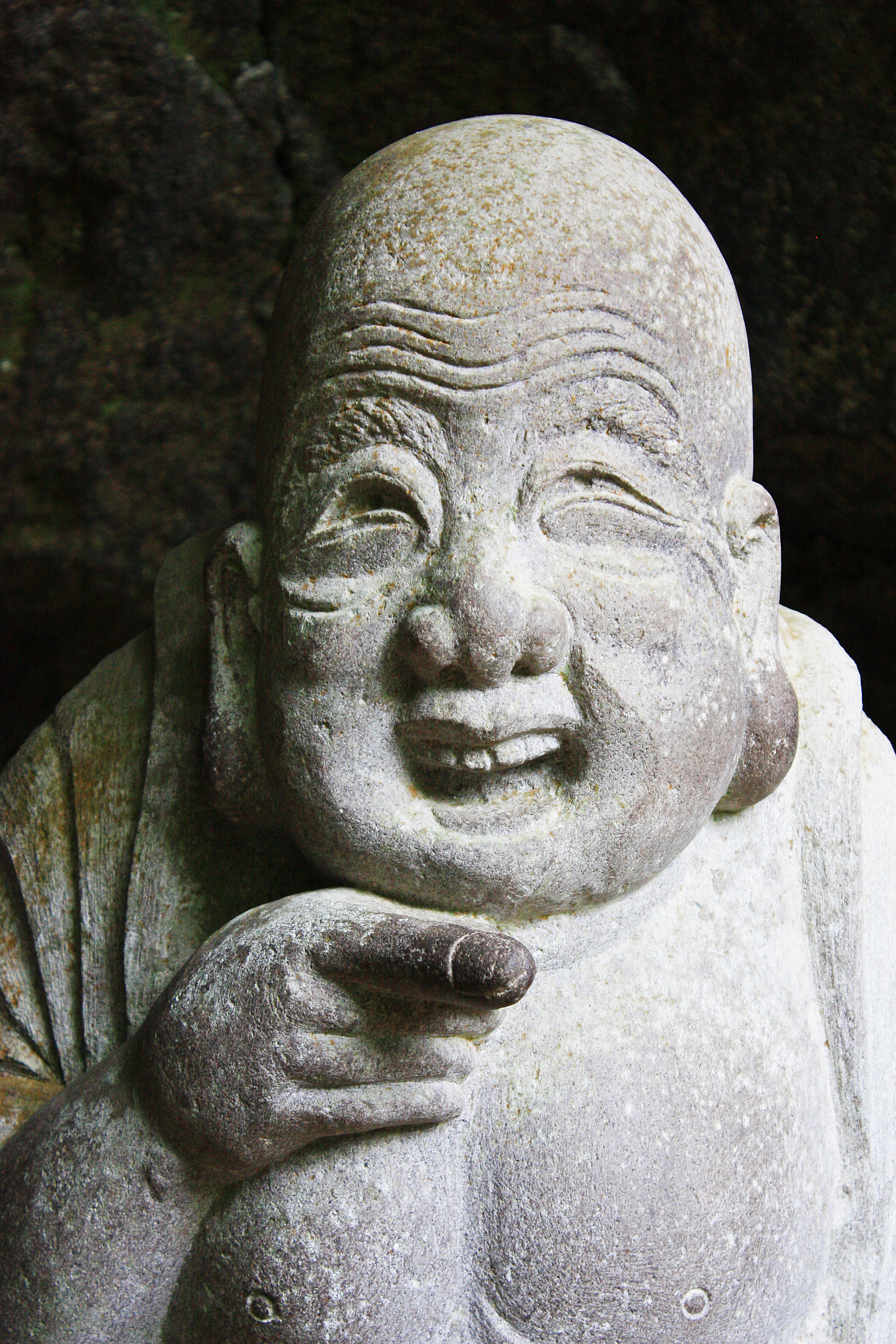
Hotei, god of happiness at Jōchi-ji temple

In her 1918 Kamakura: Fact and Legend, Iso Mutsu had little to say about Jōchi-ji, other than it was in complete decay. She dedicated to it just a half page. In fact, all you see today is new.

At its peak, the temple was far bigger than now; it comprised 11 buildings and 500 people lived in it, but little is left of the original great temple that was one of Kamakura's Five Mountains. All existing buildings were rebuilt after being lost during the Great Kantō earthquake.

At the entrance, there is a pond, a stone bridge, and a gate. To the left, there is also the Well of Sweet Dew ((甘露ノ井, Kanro no I)), one of the once-famous Ten Kamakura Wells ((鎌倉十井, Kamakura Jussei)). Above the gate stand the four characters 寶所在近 (Hōsho Zaikin), or "The treasure you are looking for is next to you".

After a flight of stone stairs one finds a very unusual feature: the Shōrōmon (鐘楼門), which is a two-storied combination of shōrō (belfry) and rōmon (gate) restored in 2007. The second story holds a bell made in the year 1340.

In the main hall nearby are three images of Buddha (the already-mentioned Amida, Shaka, and Miroku), the main objects of worship, which guard respectively the past, the present, and the future.

Behind the main hall are the graveyard, some bamboo groves, numerous cave graves (the so-called yagura), and the statue of Hotei, the god of good fortune or happiness. After having been touched by generations of Japanese wishing to improve their luck, his belly, his left earlobe, and his index finger have been worn smooth.

The street that runs to the left of the front gate leads to the house behind the temple where movie director Yasujirō Ozu used to live in the 1950s. It's also the starting point of a 30-minute hiking trail that leads to the Zeniarai Benten Shrine.

The temple is very near Kita-Kamakura Station.
