= Ankoku-ji =

Type of Buddhist temple

Ankoku-ji (安国寺, Ankoku-ji) is a kind of Buddhist temple. Ankoku-ji may mean "Temple for National Pacification". There are numerous Ankoku-ji throughout Japan and the world. It is a homonym with 暗黒, ankoku as in darkness, evil.

The Ankoku-ji system was developed under the Ashikaga shogunate, as part of its stabilizing the country. The Fudoin Temple within Higashi-ku, Hiroshima, for example, was built by Shōgun Takauji Ashikaga as one of 60 Ankoku-ji temples which were constructed in all provinces across Japan, in the 14th century.

Specific ones in Japan include:

- Ankoku-ji (Aichi), located in Kōta, Aichi Prefecture
- Ankoku-ji (Aira), located in Aira, Kagoshima Prefecture
- Ankoku-ji (Ayabe), located in Ayabe, Kyoto Prefecture
- Ankoku-ji (Azumino), located in Azumino, Nagano Prefecture
- Ankoku-ji (Chinoshi), located in Chino, Nagano Prefecture
- Fudoin Temple in Higashi-Ku, Ushita-shinmachi, Hiroshima.
- Ankoku-ji (Fukuoka), located in Fukuoka, Fukuoka Prefecture
- Ankoku-ji (Fukuyama), located in Fukuyama, Hiroshima Prefecture
- Ankoku-ji (Gifu), located in Ikeda, Gifu Prefecture
- Ankoku-ji (Ichikawa), located in Ichikawa, Chiba Prefecture
- Ankoku-ji (Iki), located in Iki, Nagasaki Prefecture
- Ankoku-ji (Iwanuma), located in Iwanuma, Miyagi Prefecture
- Ankoku-ji (Katori), located in Katori, Chiba Prefecture
- Ankoku-ji (Kitakyushu), located in Kitakyushu, Fukuoka Prefecture
- Ankoku-ji (Kunisaki), located in Kunisaki, Ōita Prefecture
- Ankoku-ji (Kurume), located in Kurume, Fukuoka Prefecture
- Ankoku-ji (Kitakyushu), located in Kitakyushu, Fukuoka Prefecture
- Ankoku-ji (Kyōto), located in Kyoto, Kyoto Prefecture
- Ankoku-ji (Naha), located in Naha, Okinawa Prefecture
- Ankoku-ji (Nankan), located in Nankan, Kumamoto Prefecture
- Ankoku-ji (Odowara), located in Odawara, Kanagawa Prefecture
- Ankoku-ji (Saikai), located in Saikai, Nagasaki Prefecture
- Ankoku-ji (Satsumasendai), located in Satsumasendai, Kagoshima Prefecture
- Ankoku-ji (Shimotsuke), located in Shimotsuke, Tochigi Prefecture
- Ankoku-ji (Takarazuka), located in Takarazuka, Hyōgo Prefecture
- Ankoku-ji (Takayama), located in Takayama, Gifu Prefecture
- Ankoku-ji (Toyooka), located in Toyooka, Hyōgo Prefecture
- Ankoku-ji (Yonago), located in Yonago, Tottori Prefecture
