= Jiangxin Temple =

Buddhist temple in Zhejiang, China

- 江心寺
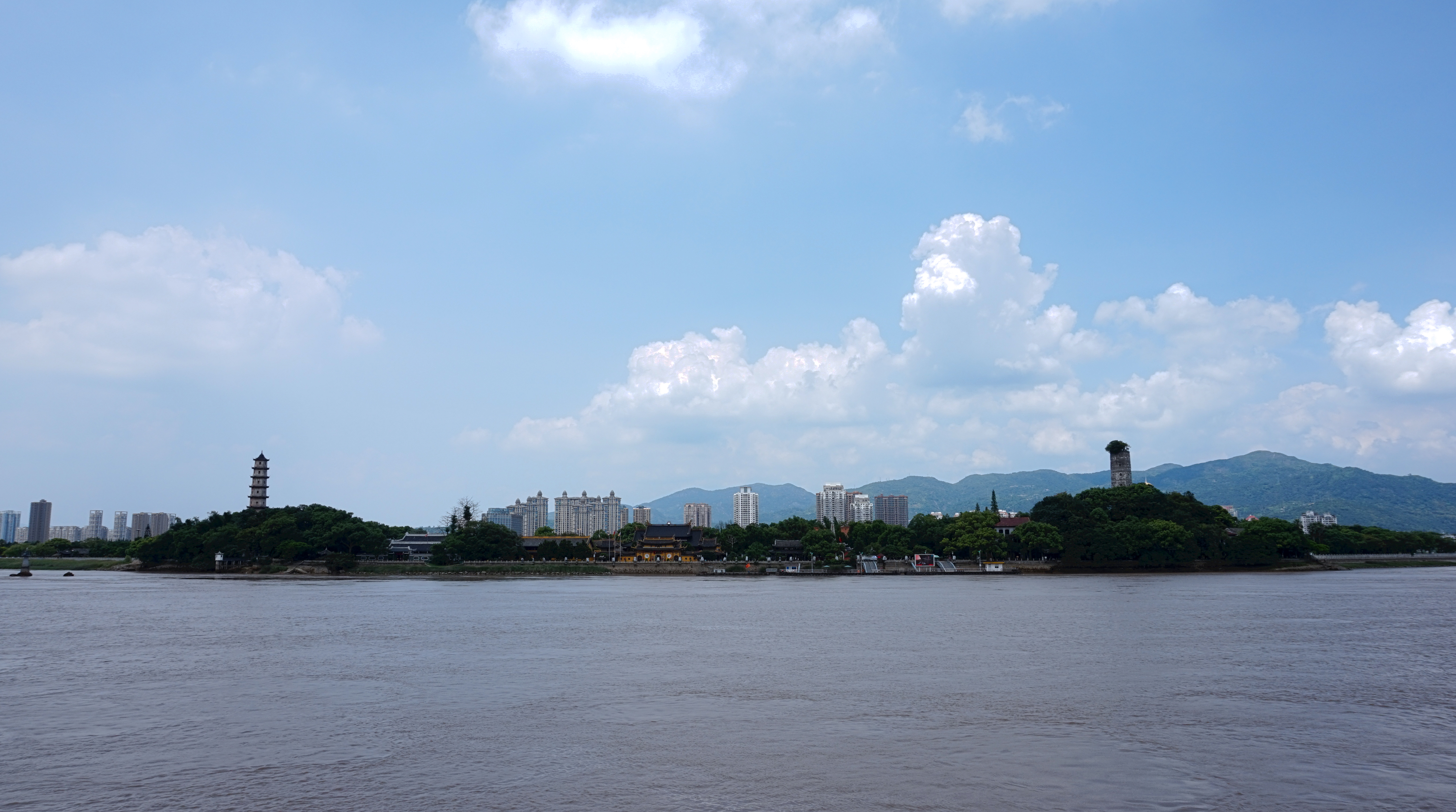
- A panoramic view of Jiangxin Temple on Jiangxin Island.

- Location within Zhejiang

Religion
- Affiliation: Buddhism
- Sect: Chan Buddhism
- Leadership: Shi Zhiming (释智明)

Location
- Location: Jiangxin Island, Lucheng District, Wenzhou, Zhejiang
- Country: China
- Coordinates: 28°1′49″N 120°38′33″E

Architecture
- Style: Chinese architecture
- Established: 866
- Completed: 1789 (reconstruction)

Website
- www.jiangxinsi.com/main/index.asp

Jiangxin Temple (Chinese: 江心寺; pinyin: Jiāngxīn Sì) is a Buddhist temple located on Jiangxin Island, in Lucheng District of Wenzhou, Zhejiang, China.

== History ==
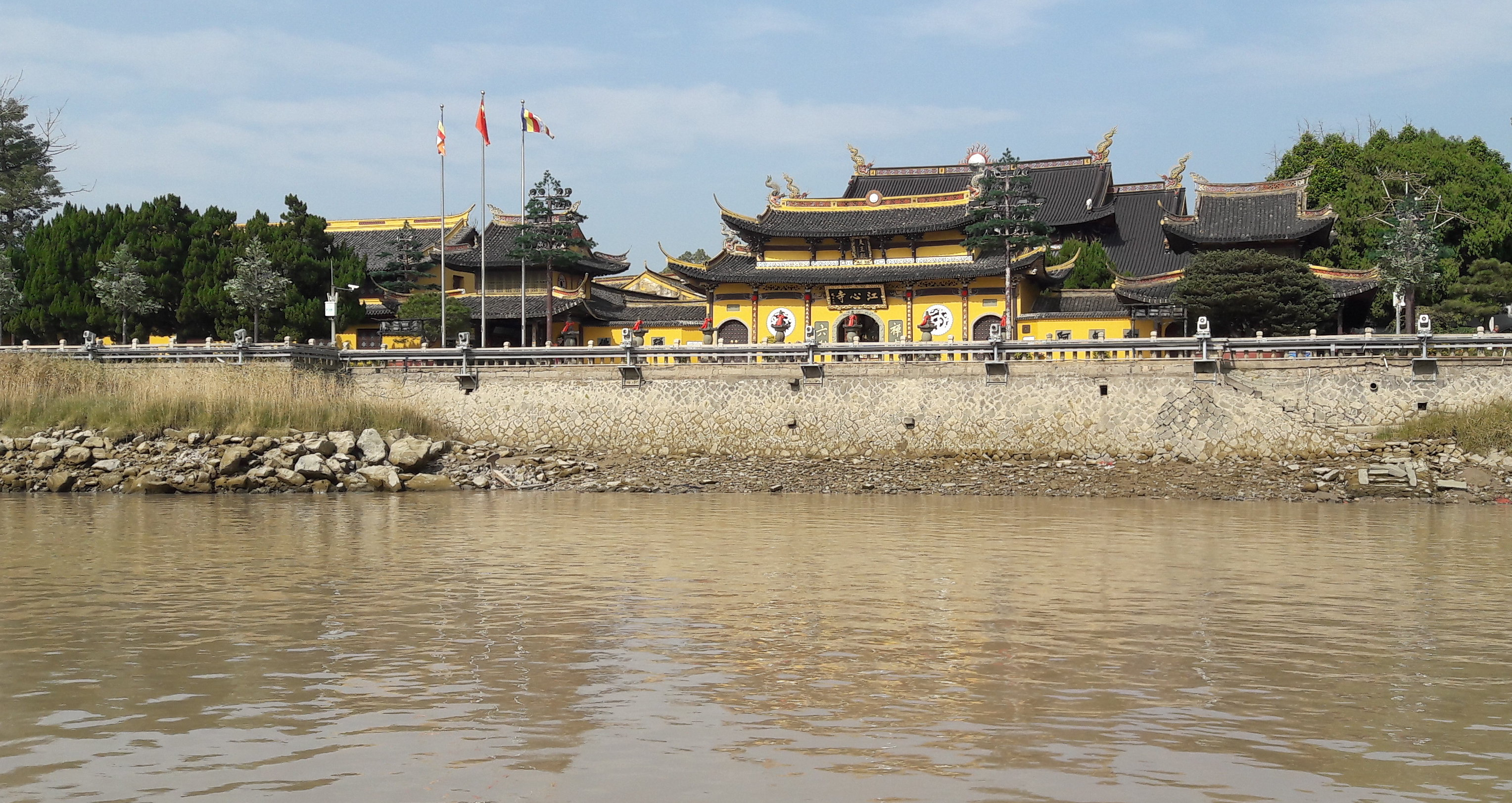
Jiangxin Temple.

=== Tang dynasty ===
The temple was first built with the name of "Puji Chan Temple" (普济禅院) in 866, in the reign of Emperor Yizong (860–874) of the Tang dynasty (618–907). It was renamed "Longxiang Chan Temple" (龙翔禅寺) in 1131, in the Shaoxing period (1127–1162) of Southern Song dynasty (1127–1279). Because the temple situated in the middle of the Ou River, it more commonly known as the "Jiangxin Temple" (江心寺; "Jiang" means river and "Xin" means middle).

=== Song dynasty ===
In 969, under the rule of Emperor Taizu (960–976) of the Northern Song dynasty (960–1127), the Jingxin Jiangyuan (净信讲院) was erected in its east.

=== People's Republic of China ===
After the founding of PRC, local government renovated and refurbished the temple.

Jiangxin Temple has been inscribed as a National Key Buddhist Temple in Han Chinese Area by the State Council of China in 1983. The Buddhist temple status was resumed in 1985 and religious activities were revived.

The temple has been designated as a provincial level cultural heritage by the Zhejiang Provincial Government in 2011.

== Architecture ==
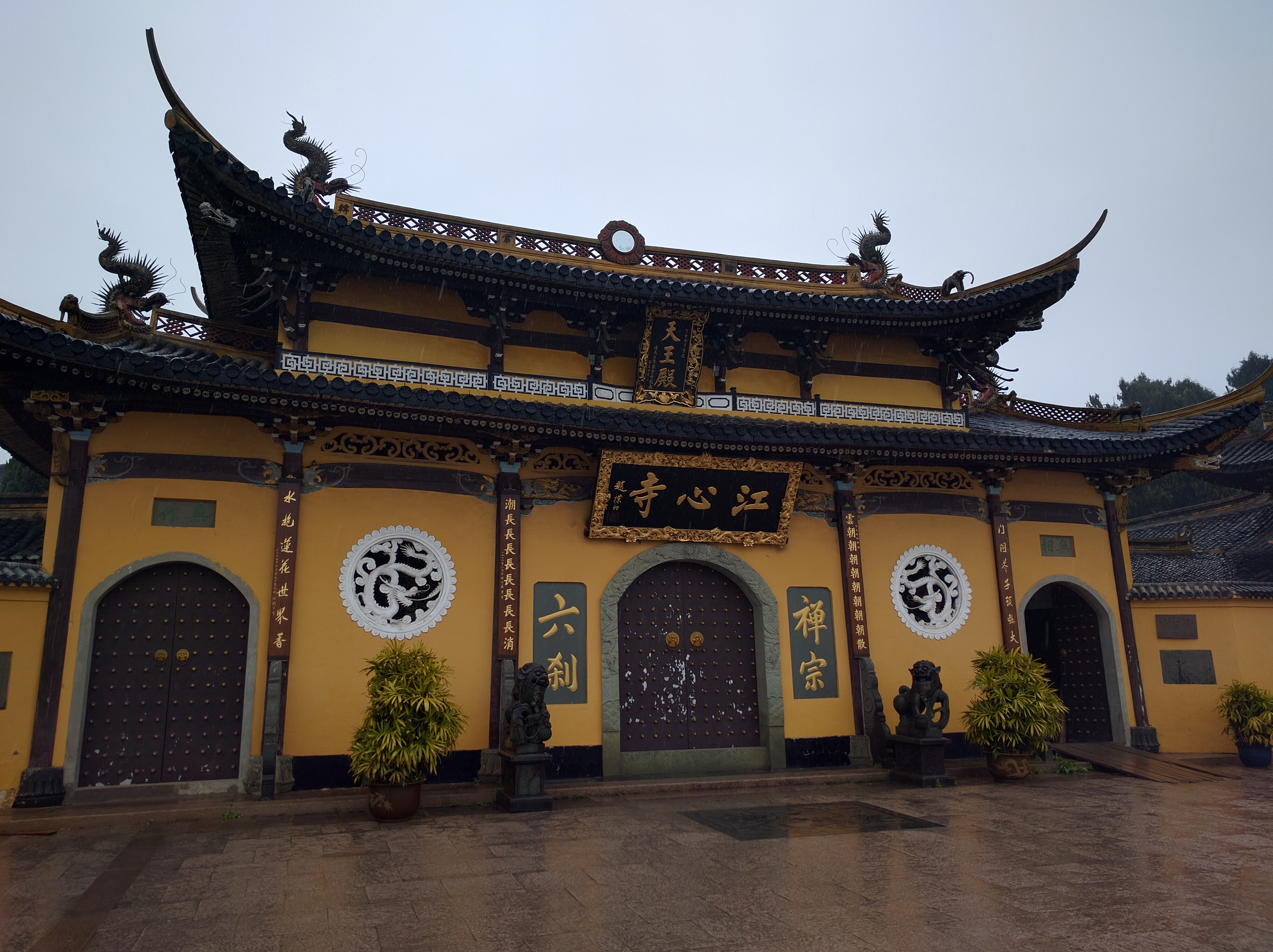
The Heavenly Kings Hall at Jiangxin Temple.

Now the existing main buildings include Shanmen, Heavenly Kings Hall, Mahavira Hall, Yuantong Hall, Hall of Three Saints, East Pagoda, and West Pagoda.

=== Yuantong Hall ===
In the center of the Yuantong Hall (圆通殿) enshrines the statue of Guanyin with Shancai standing on the left and Longnü on the right. Statue of Maitreya is enshrined at the back of Guanyin's statue. Under the eaves is a plaque with the Chinese characters "Yuantong Hall" written by Qianlong Emperor (1736–1795) in the Qing dynasty (1644–1911).

=== Hall of Three Saints ===
The Hall of Three Saints enshrining the statues of Three Sages of the West (西方三圣), namely Guanyin, Amitabha and Mahasthamaprapta.

=== East Pagoda ===
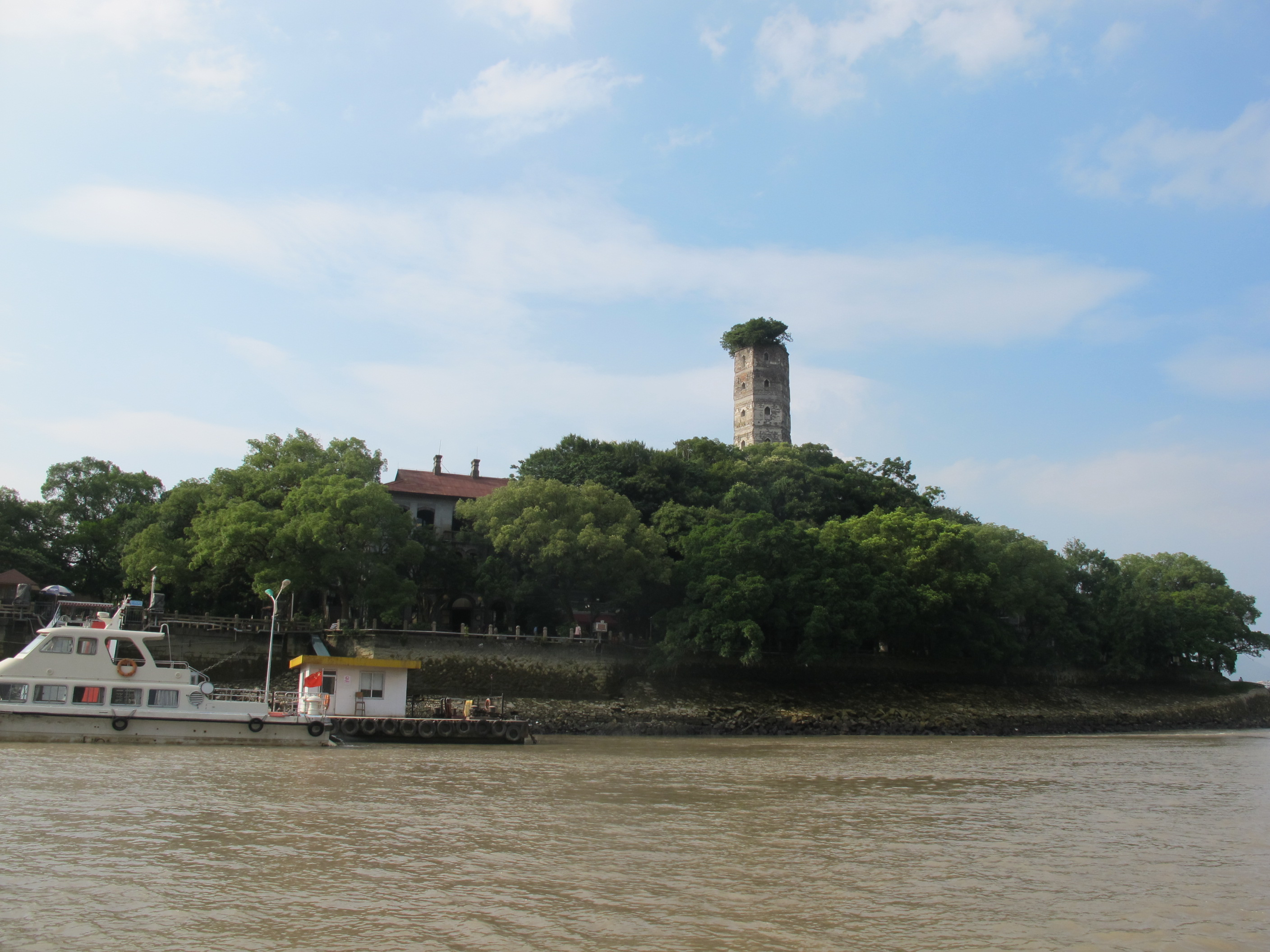
The East Pagoda.

The East Pagoda was originally built in 869 or 969 and rebuilt in the following dynasties many times. Hexagon in shape, it has seven stories with the height of 28 metres (92 ft). The pagoda originally had rafters and corridors, in 1894, the British government established the British Consulate in Wenzhou near the pagoda, and forced local government to demolish the rafters and corridors.

=== West Pagoda ===
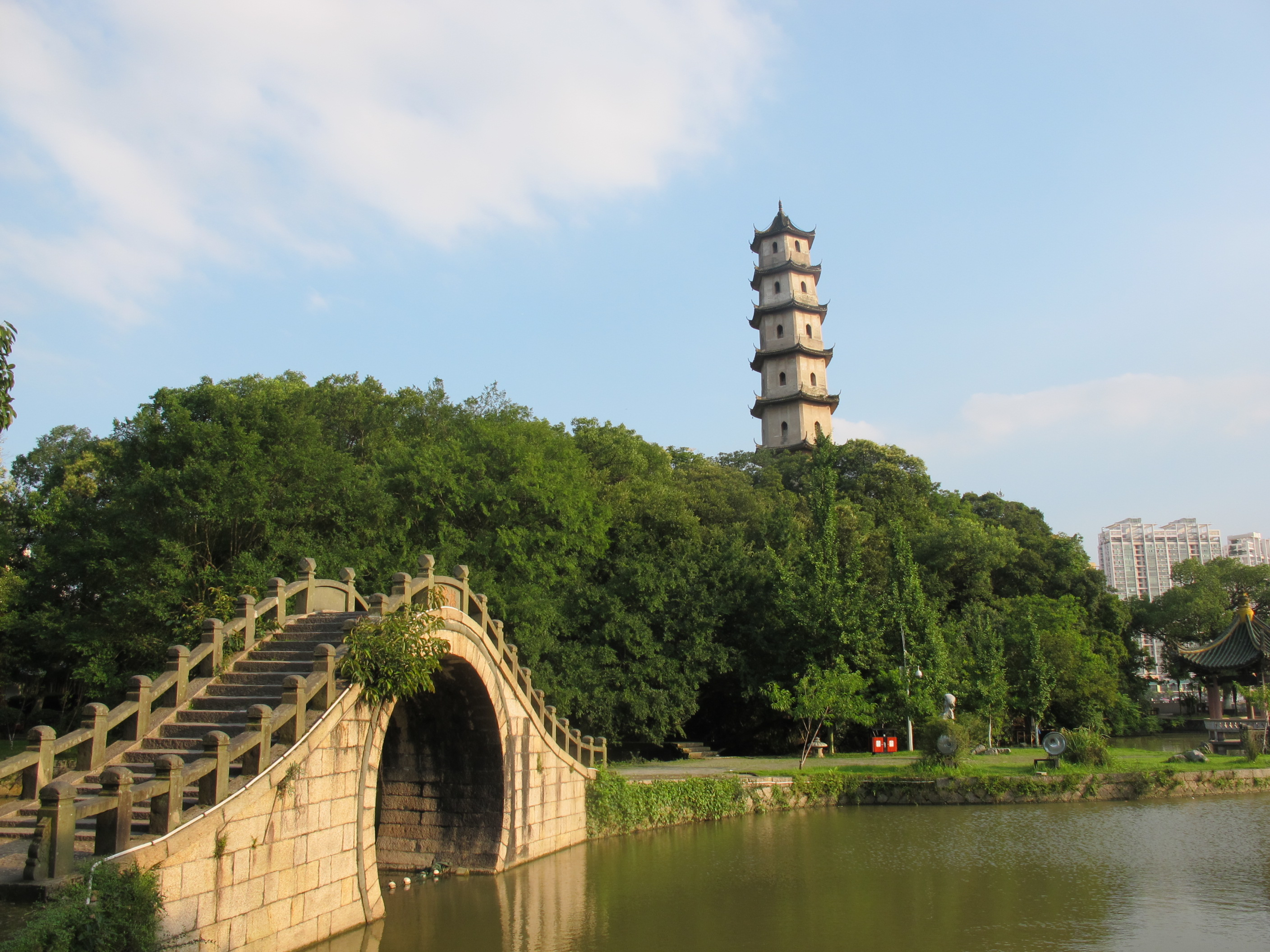
The West Pagoda and Lingyun Bridge (凌云桥).

The West Pagoda was first built in 869 or 969 and underwent three largely renovations, respectively in the ruling of Hongwu Emperor (1368–1398) in the Ming dynasty (1368–1644), in the reign of Wanli Emperor (1573–1620) and in the Qianlong period (1736–1796) of the Qing dynasty (1644–1911). The seven-storey, 32-metre (105 ft) tall, hexagonal-based Chinese pagoda is made of brick and stone. A total of 16 statues of Buddha are carved in the body of the pagoda.

== Culture ==
The East Pagoda has appeared in the Japanese manga One Piece.
