= Chōju-ji (Kamakura) =

Buddhist temple in Kamakura, Japan

Chōju-ji 長寿禅寺
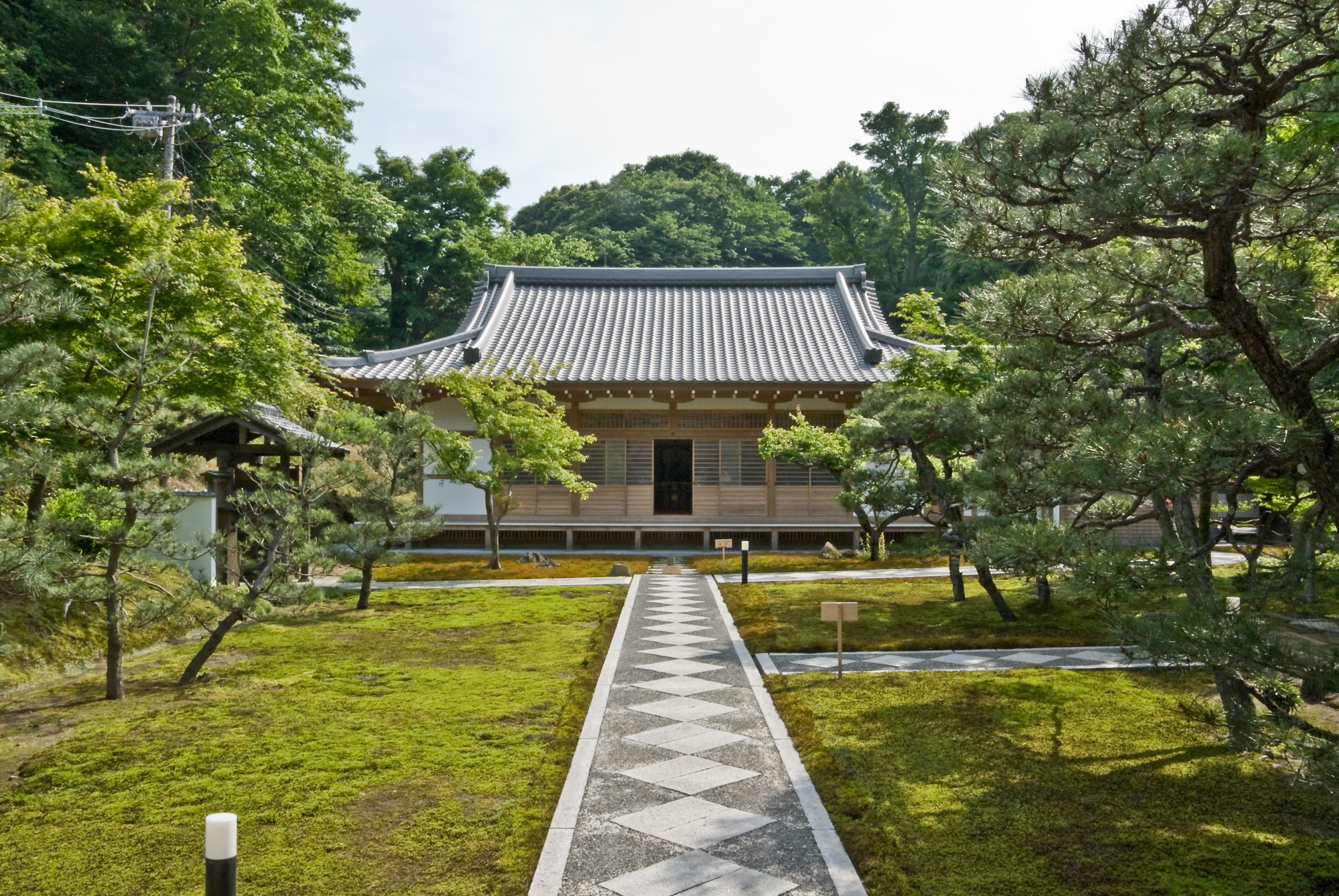
- Main Hall

Religion
- Affiliation: Kenchō-ji Rinzai
- Deity: Kannon Bosatsu (Avalokiteśvara)

Location
- Location: 1520 Yamanouchi, Kamakura, Kanagawa Prefecture
- Country: Japan
- Interactive map of Chōju-ji 長寿禅寺
- Coordinates: 35°19′54.04″N 139°33′2.20″E

Architecture
- Founder: Ashikaga Motouji (acc. legend)
- Completed: Nanboku-chō period (acc. legend)

Hōkizan Chōju Zenji (宝亀山長寿禅寺) is a Rinzai Buddhist temple of the Kenchō-ji school in Yamanouchi (a.k.a. Kita-Kamakura), near Kamakura, Kanagawa Prefecture, Japan. It lies between two Kita-Kamakura landmarks, the entrance of the Kamegayatsu Pass and Kenchō-ji, the oldest Zen monastery in Japan. Chōju-ji is one of two bodaiji (菩提寺), or funeral temples, dedicated to Ashikaga Takauji, founder of the dynasty of shōguns that carries his name. (The other is Kyoto's Tōji-in.) In its garden there are a gorintō dedicated to the shōgun and a hōkyōintō containing some of his hair. Chōju-ji has recently opened for the first time its doors, and receives visitors from Friday to Sunday, 10 AM to 3 PM. The temple allows the use of pocket cameras, however professional and semiprofessional equipment are forbidden, the reason being that visitors should not visit the temple to take photographs.

== History ==
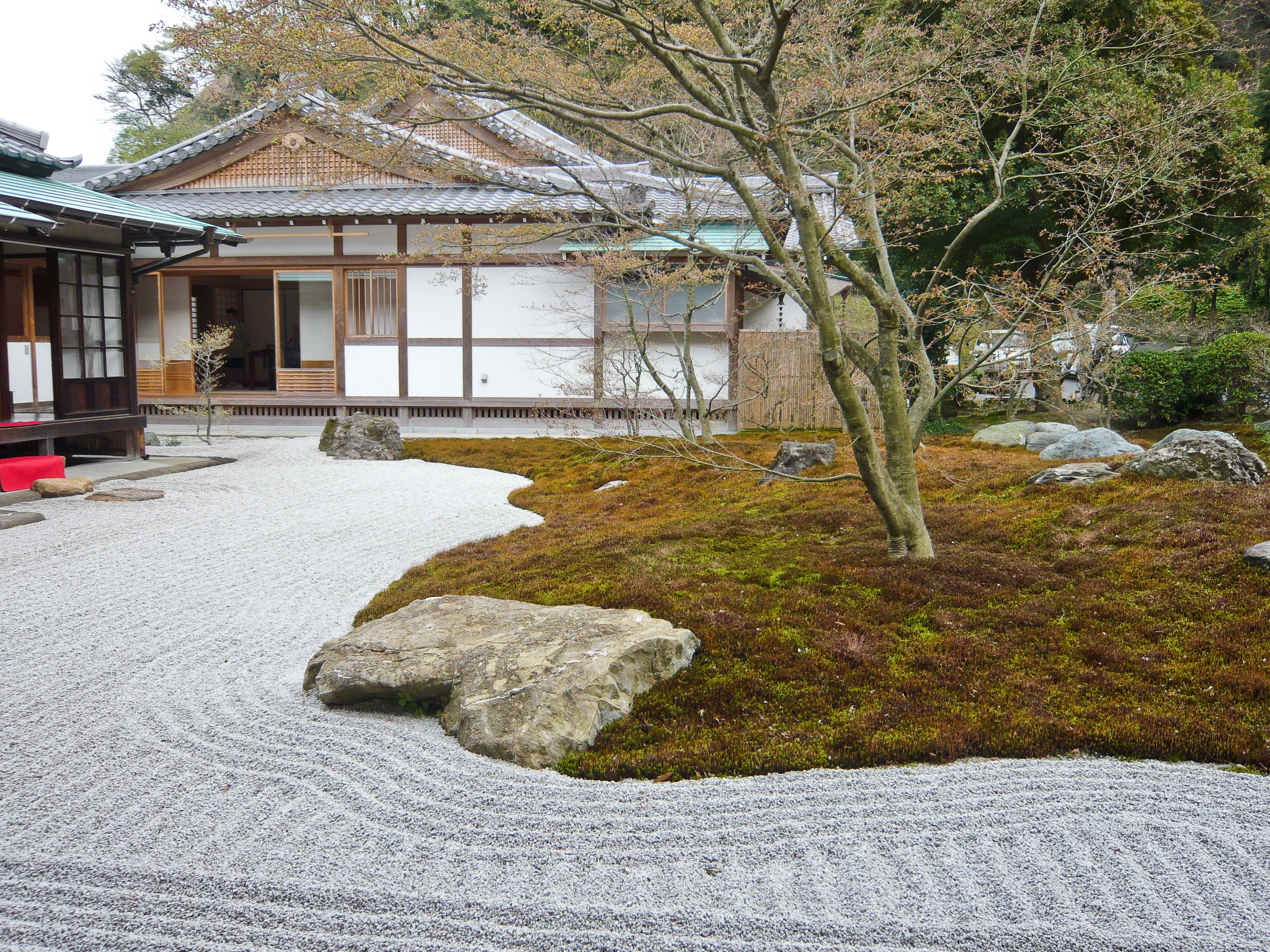
The Zen garden

Much about the temple's history is unclear. According to the temple's records, Chōju-ji was founded in 1358 by Kamakura's Ashikaga ruler, Kantō kubō Ashikaga Motouji, son of Takauji, on the grounds of a former family mansion. It was the second of his father's so-called bodhi temples, institutions dedicated to ensuring as much as possible his happiness in the next world. Takauji died in Kyoto at the beginning of that year at the age of 54 and was given two posthumous names (also meant to ensure his happiness in the beyond), one in Kyoto and one in Kamakura: the first was Tōji-inden, the second was Chōju-inden, from the names of his two funeral temples.

This version of the birth of the temple however has problems. Takauji himself mentions Chōju-ji in a 1336 document, declaring it was "Kenchō-ji's archives". This highly trustworthy letter makes it likely that the founder was Takauji himself, and that the foundation date is at least 1336 if not earlier, thus contradicting the foundation date given by the temple's own records. It is likely therefore that the whole story of its foundation as Takauji's bodhi temple was simply a ruse by his son Motouji to symbolically tie rebellious Kamakura to the founder of the new dynasty of shōguns.

Because it had such deep ties with the Ashikaga who had again usurped the power Emperor Go-Daigo had briefly managed to recover during the Kenmu Restoration, Chōju-ji for a long time faced the open hostility of the Imperial House. For this reason it had great difficulty surviving the Meiji Restoration.

== Structure ==
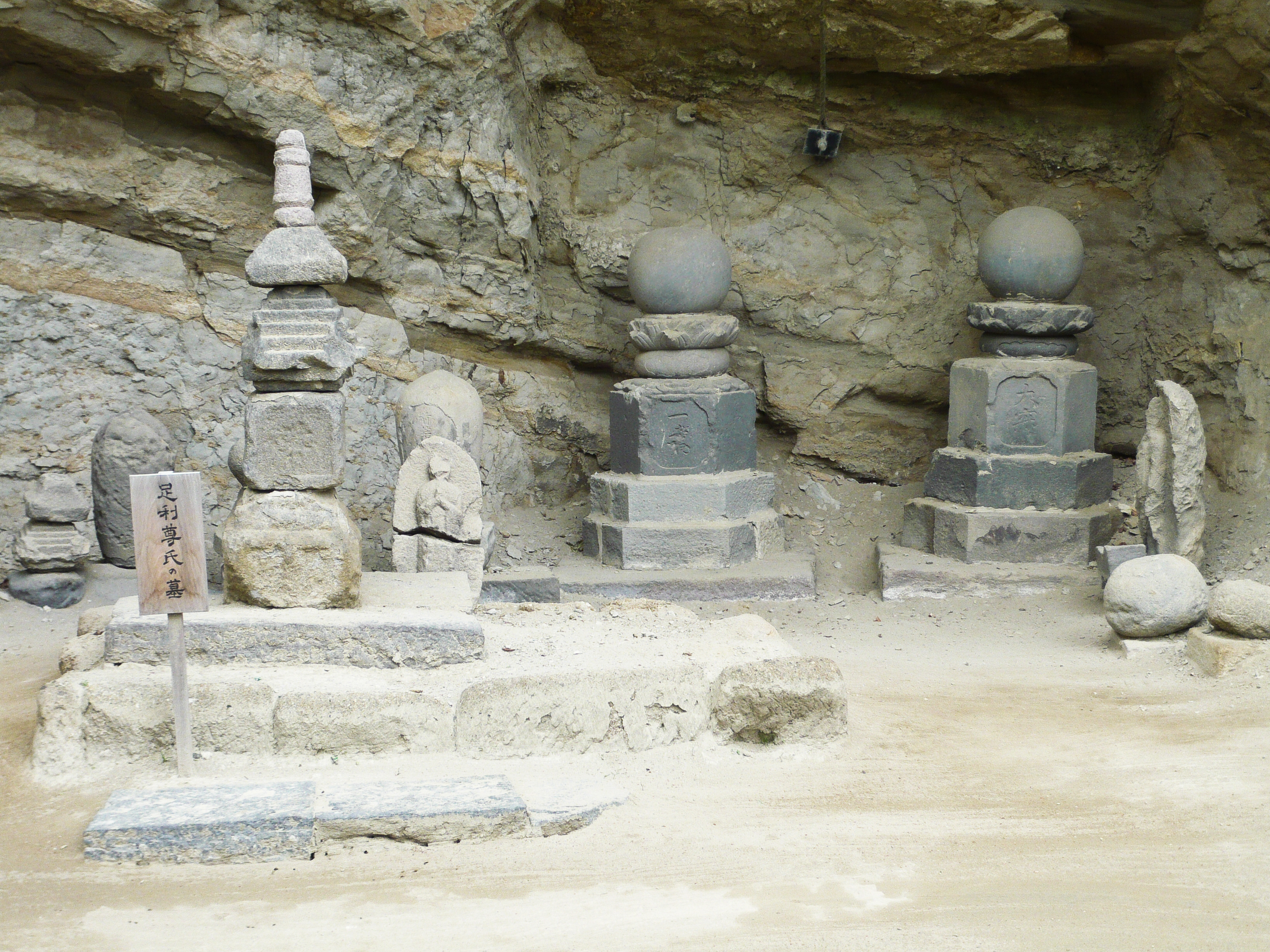
Ashikaga Takauji's grave at Chōju-ji

Like many other Buddhist temples, Chōju-ji used to be much larger and have a complete "shichidō garan" (the set of seven buildings that constitute the core of great temples). The bell now at Engaku-ji's Butsuden was originally built here at great expense.

It now includes a Hon-dō (Main Hall), a Shoin ("drawing room"), a Kaisan-dō (Founder's Hall), and the Shohōjō (the chief abbot's living quarters), all recently restored and open to the public. (The Kaisan-dō houses a statue of goddess Kannon and is therefore also known as a Kannon-dō, or "Kannon's Hall".) Visitors are invited to sit anywhere they wish within the temple, relax and enjoy the atmosphere. Between the main hall and the abbot's residence lies the temple's Zen garden. In the front garden can be found a yagura containing Ashikaga Takauji's grave (as already mentioned, there is another in Kyoto's Tōji-in) and a great gorintō erected in his memory. The grave's hōkyōintō contains some strands of the shōgun's hair.

The temple owns several statues, all made during the Muromachi period, among them one of Ashikaga Takauji, one of his son Yoshiakira, one of goddess Kannon, and one of the temple's founder, Kosen Ingen.
