= Chōju-ji =

Chōju-ji (長寿寺) is the name of numerous Buddhist temples in Japan. Below is an incomplete list:

- Chōju-ji (Kamakura) (official name: Hōkizan Chōju-ji), Kamakura, Kanagawa Prefecture
- Chōju-ji (Konan), Konan, Shiga Prefecture, whose Main Hall is a National Treasure of Japan
