= Yagura (tombs) =

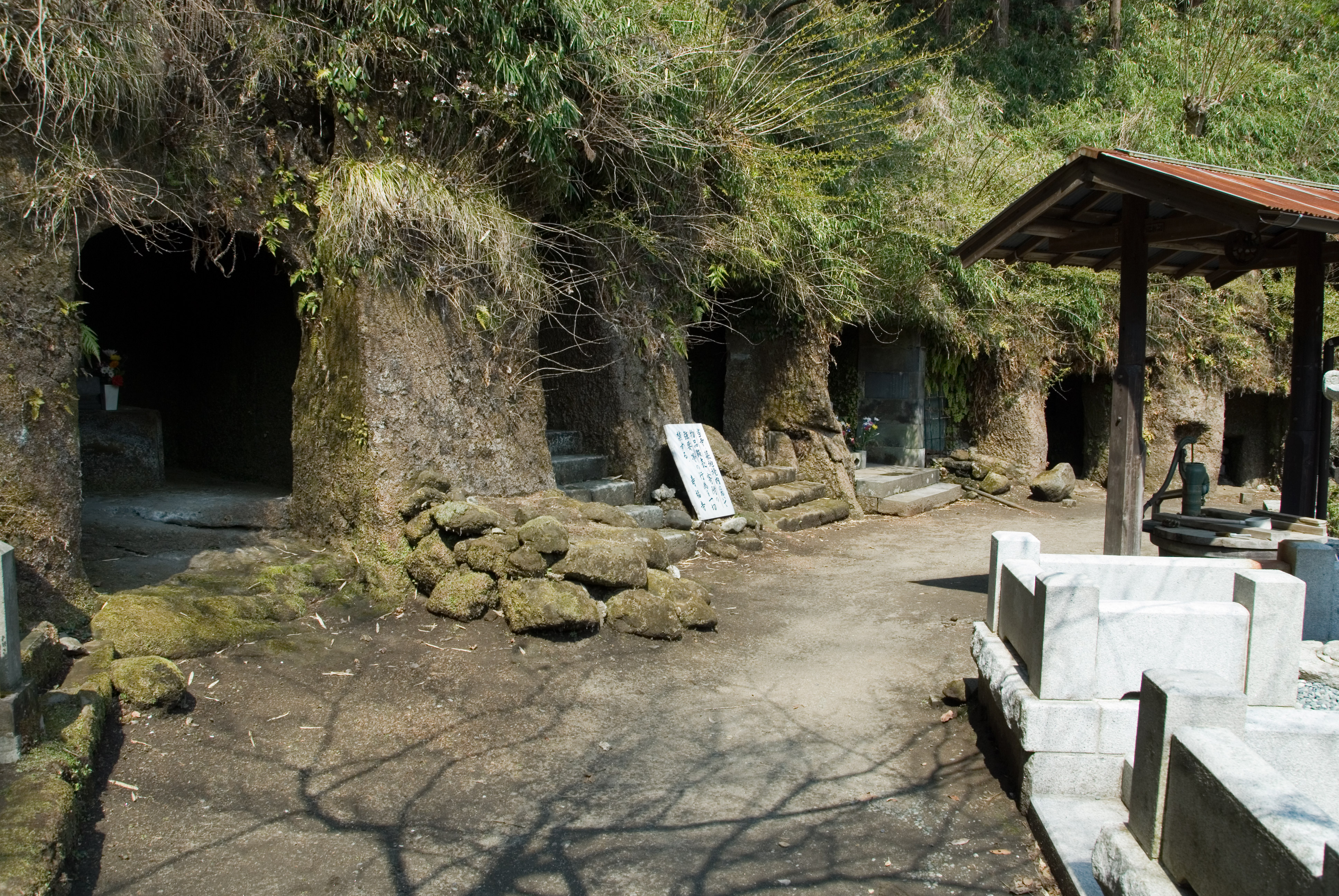
A group of yagura at Jufuku-ji, Kamakura

Yagura (やぐら・窟・岩倉・矢倉・矢蔵・谷倉・屋倉, etc.) are artificial caves used during the Middle Ages in Kamakura, Kanagawa Prefecture, Japan, as tombs and cenotaphs. It is likely that they were used only as tombs in the beginning, and were later used as cenotaphs. The dead are mostly from the samurai class, but the names of priests and artisans have also been found. These tombs are extremely numerous in the hills surrounding Kamakura, and estimates of their number range from 1,500 to over 5,000. The total number will remain unknown, as many have been destroyed and others may not yet have been found.

Yagura can be found either isolated, as in the case of the Harakiri Yagura, or in clusters of almost 200 caves. Groups of yagura are labeled with the suffix -gun (群, group). The most conveniently seen yagura for most tourists are those at Jufuku-ji, near Kamakura station. Its cemetery has many yagura, including those with the cenotaphs of Hōjō Masako and Minamoto no Sanetomo.

True yagura can be found also in the Miura Peninsula, in the Izu Peninsula, and as far away as Awa Province (Chiba).

== History ==
There is a lack of solid documentary or archeological evidence regarding exactly when or why the yagura system was adopted. It is generally believed that tombs were dug into the soft rock of the hills around the city because of lack of space in the valley below. The only way to date a yagura is through the dates carved on a gorintō or stele that it may contain. On this basis, the oldest was found near the Asahina Pass and dated to between 1260 and 1270.

It was previously thought that an ambiguously titled law that forbade cemeteries in towns (the Fuchū Bochi Kinshirei (府中墓地禁止令)) referred to Kamakura, and therefore was the origin of the custom. It is now believed that the law was promulgated for the city of Fuchu, in Bungo Province of Kyushu, by the Ōtomo clan. However, some historians think the Ōtomo must have used a Kamakura shogunate law as a model. The custom continued after the demise of the shogunate and well into the Ashikaga period, until the middle of the 15th century, after which it declined. The yagura of the time give some indication of the decline of the custom: some have been converted to storehouses, others served as a convenient grave for inhumation, and thus were filled.

== Structure of a yagura ==
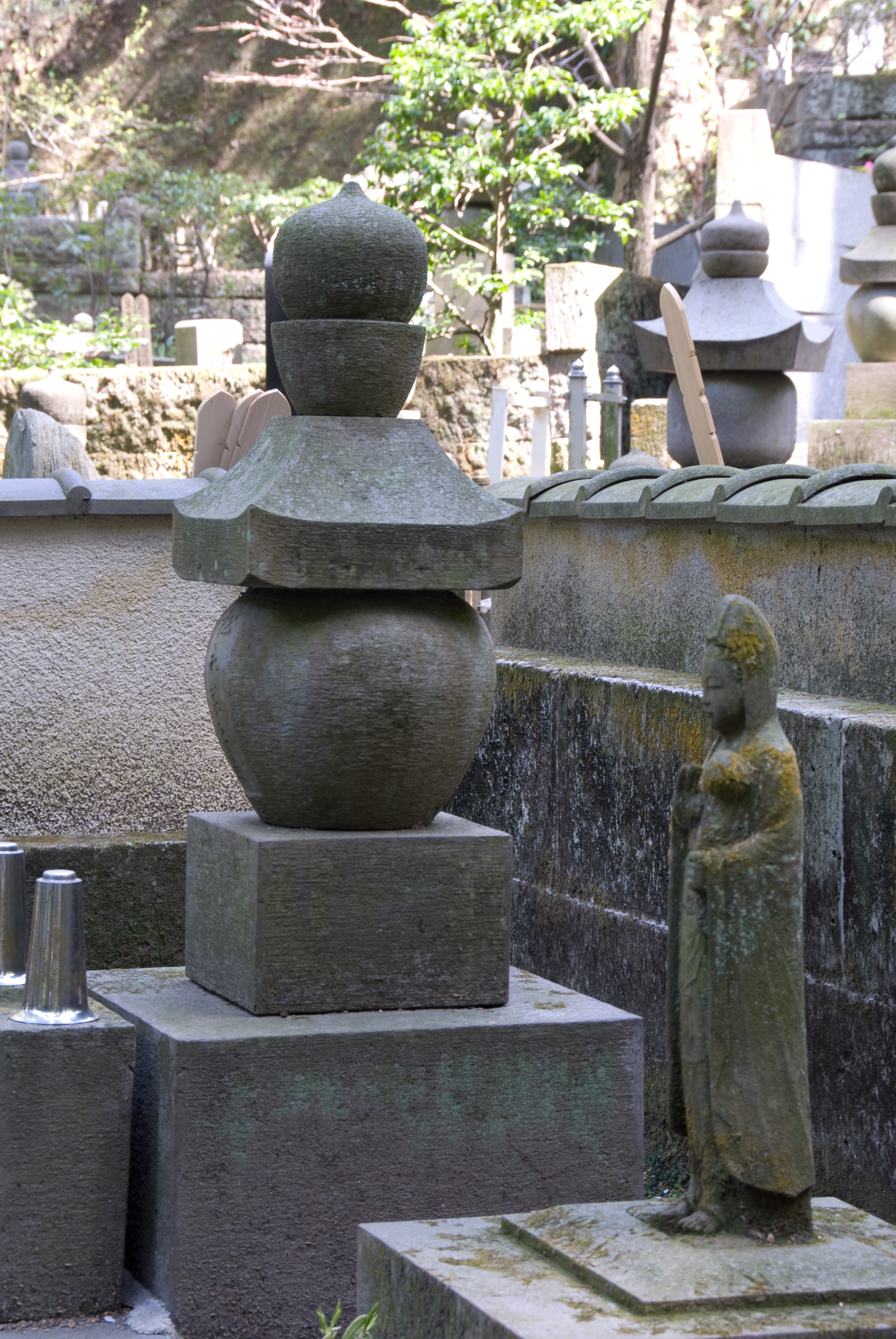
Gorintō

A yagura is usually just a hole dug into the side of a hill and begins with a short corridor called sendō (羨道) leading to the crypt, called genshitsu (玄室). The crypt is usually one to five meters wide and roughly rectangular.

In many cases the mouth of the sendō was sealed by a wooden door (senmon (羨門)), the remains of which can sometimes still be seen. In some cases, cremated bones were interred in an opening in the floor, but in other tombs there is instead urn. In either case, yagura floors are part of the bedrock, so are not suitable for burials. Fragments of cremated bone can occasionally be found.

Inside a yagura, the grave is often marked by a stone gorintō, hōkyōintō (Buddhist tower), or other stone monument. These are normally later additions. Other Buddhist imagery, such as statues of Jizō are commonly found, as in most Japanese cemeteries. Red painted rafters are visible on the ceiling of the Shutarugi Yagura (朱垂木やぐら).

== Etymology and written form ==
As with many other aspects of yagura and their history, the etymology of the name is unclear. According to one hypothesis, the name derives from yakura (矢倉), or watchtower, but it seems more likely that it is just a local corruption of iwakura (岩倉), that is, a stone storehouse.

The word yagura over the centuries has been written in several ways, among them やぐら・窟・岩倉・矢倉・矢蔵・谷倉・屋倉. The term is now usually written only in hiragana.

== Notable yagura ==
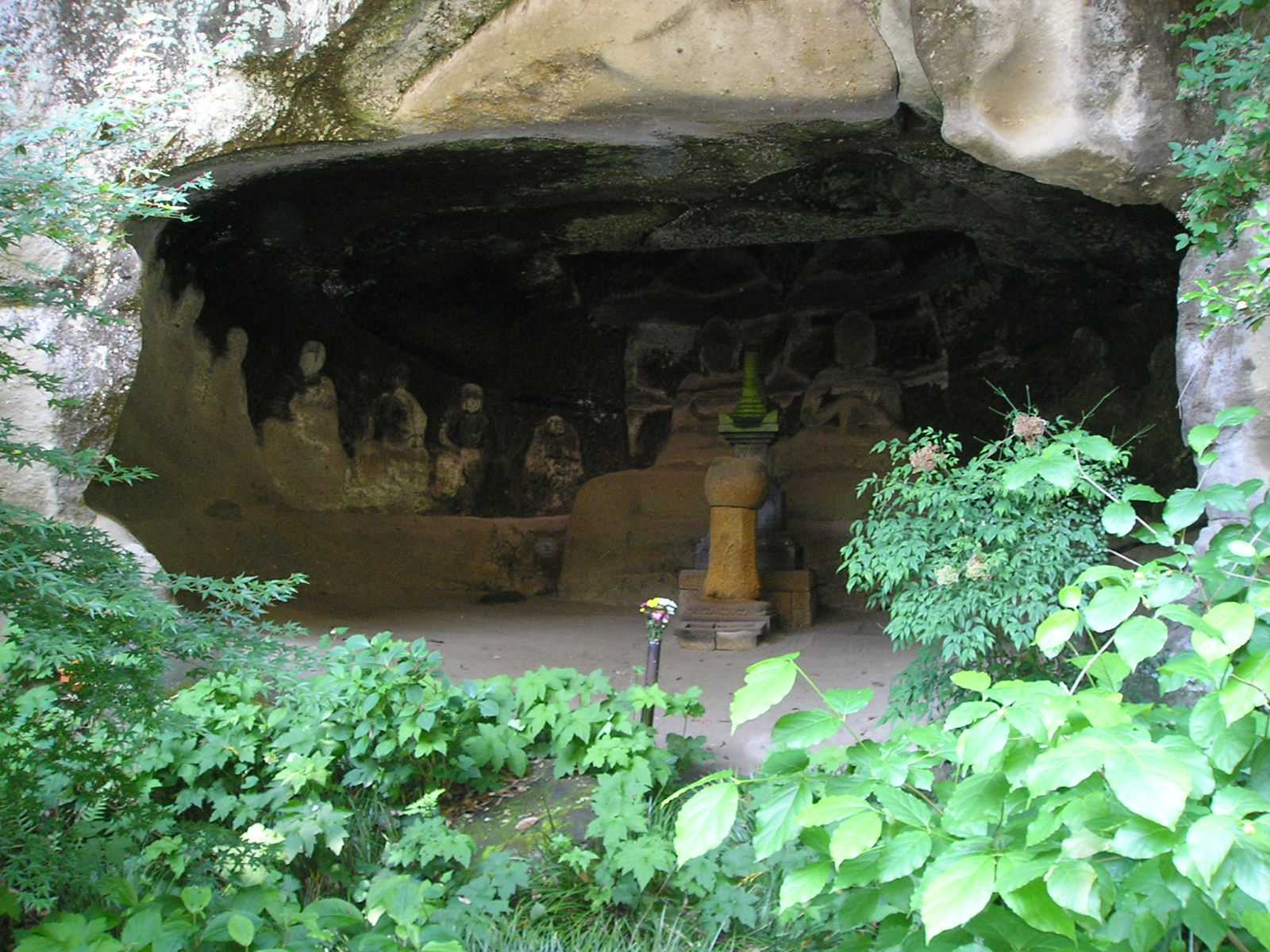
The largest known yagura in Kamakura at Meigetsu-in. Still visible are some human figures on the walls.

These are some notable yagura in Kamakura:

- Otō no Kubo - One of the yagura supposed to be Hōjō Takatoki's grave.
- Karaito Yagura - Close to the Shakadō Pass. Due to the remains of a wooden door which are still visible today, legend says it was a prison.
- Jitsugetsu Yagura - Also close to the Shakadō Pass. The name comes from the two openings in the wall shaped like the sun and the moon.
- Kubi Yagura - Behind Zuisen-ji, this is another supposed grave of Hōjō Takatoki.
- Shakadō Yagura Group - This is supposed by tradition to be the burial place of those who died at Tōshō-ji at the fall of the Kamakura shogunate in 1333. It has been partly destroyed by urban development.
- Shutarugi Yagura - In the mountains near Nishi Mikado.
- Harakiri Yagura - Near the ruins of Tōshō-ji in Komachi 3-chōme. This is supposed to be the place where Hōjō Takatoki killed himself at the fall of the shogunate.
- Tahō-ji-ato Yagura - In the woods near Ōgigayatsu. Nearby there's a huge gorintō called kakukentō (覚賢塔).
- Urigayatsu Yagura (東瓜ヶ谷やぐら) - At the bottom of the Urigayatsu Valley.
- Higashi Sensui Yagura (東泉水やぐら) - In the Higashi Sensui valley.
- Hyakuhachi Yagura - Located near Kakuon-ji, it contains 177 yagura. It contains all known types of yagura.
- Jushi Yagura - In the Nishi Urigayatsu Valley. Contains the reliefs of 14 gorintō.
- Mandaladō Group - Kamakura period yagura group located to the north of the Nagoe Pass and containing 104 graves. It used to be called Sarubatake Yagura (猿畠) but started to be called Mandaradō (まんだらどう) to distinguish it from the Sarubatake Yagura behind Hosshō-ji. The name indicates that in the area there used to be a temple dedicated to memorial services for the dead (a kuyōdo). Divided in three groups, it is built in a flat area carved up from an artificial cliff built to defend the Nagoe Pass. It contains both Kamakura and Muromachi period graves.
