= Sōrin =

Vertical shaft which tops a Japanese pagoda

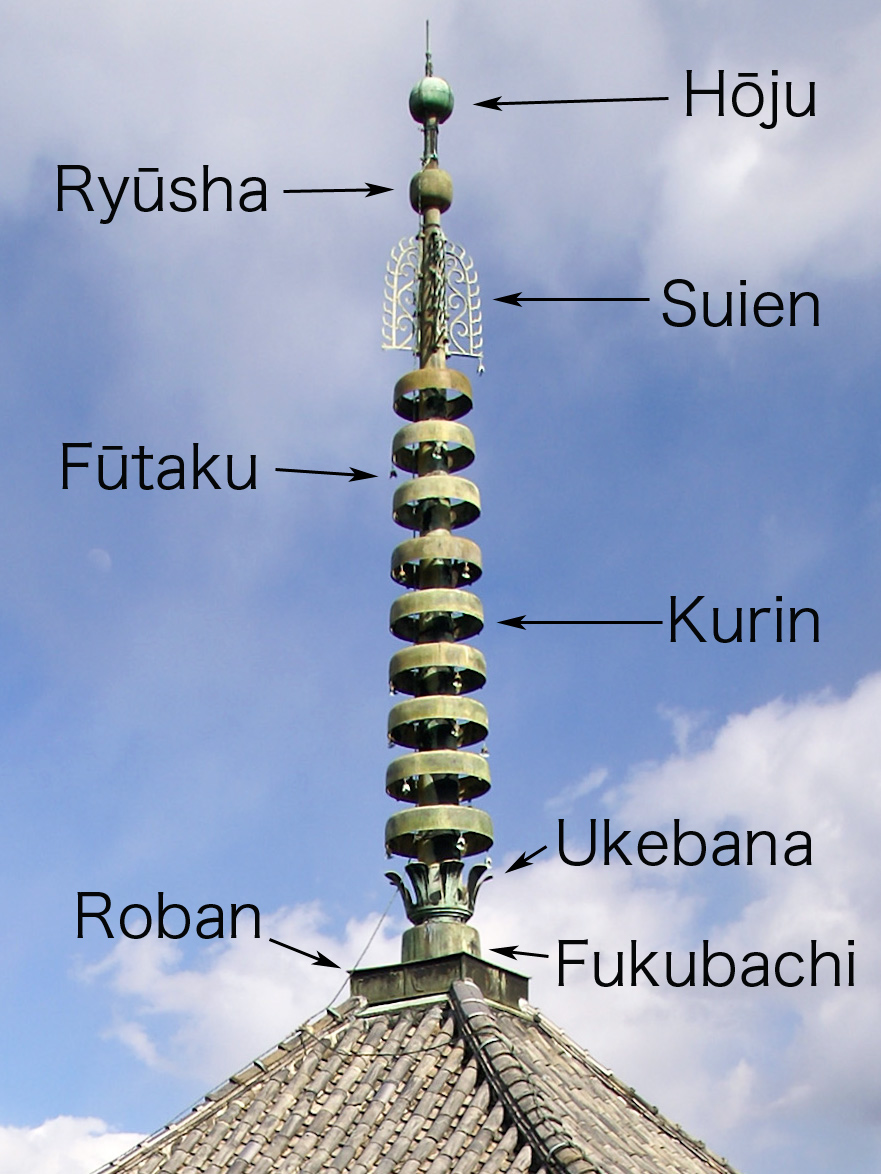

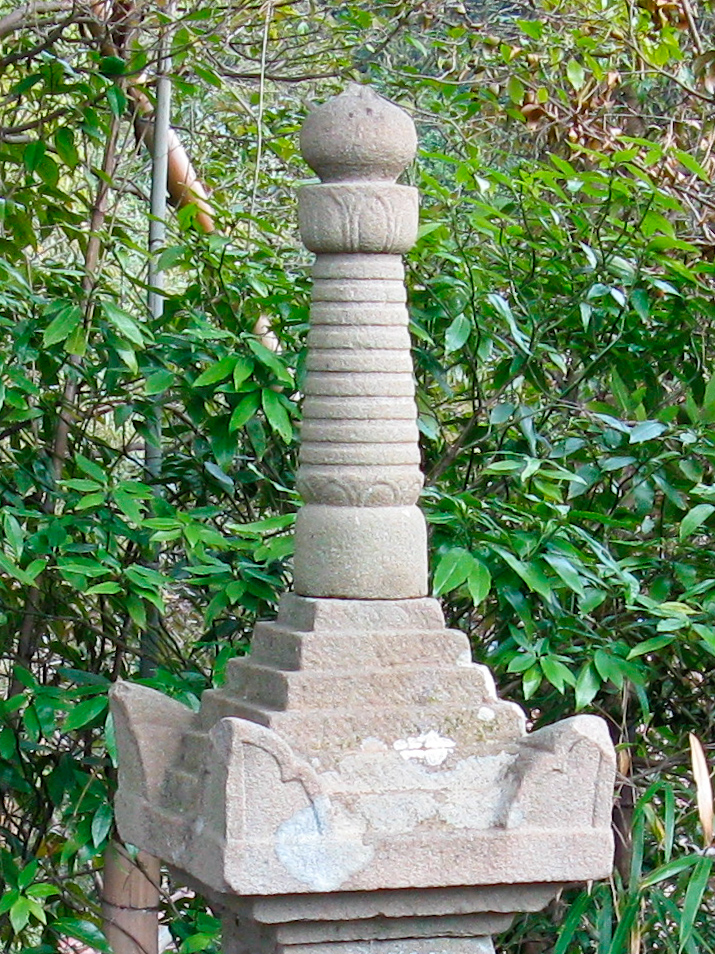

The two types of pagoda finial (sōrin), in bronze
(tahōtō) and stone (hōkyōintō)

The sōrin (相輪; lit. 'alternate rings') is the vertical shaft (finial) which tops a Japanese pagoda, whether made of stone or wood. (Note: Pagodas can be made of wood or stone, and the two types are very different. Stone pagodas like the hōkyōintō are always small compared to wooden ones (usually below three meters), and offer little or no usable space inside. For details, see the article Tō) The sōrin of a wooden pagoda is usually made of bronze and can be over 10 meters (33 ft) tall. That of a stone pagoda is also of stone and less than a meter long. The sōrin is divided in several sections possessing a symbolic meaning and, as a whole, in turn itself represents a pagoda.

Although quintessentially Buddhist, in Japan pagodas and their sōrin can be found both at Buddhist temples and Shinto shrines. This is because until the Kami and Buddhas Separation Act of 1868 a Shinto shrine was normally also a Buddhist temple and vice versa. Itsukushima Shrine for example has one.

== Support system ==
The sōrin is supported by a long shaft, often obtained by joining two or even three shorter ones, that runs to the base of the edifice. Although it is often believed that the pillar at the core of a Japanese pagoda is a device to strengthen it against earthquakes, its sole purpose is to support the long and heavy bronze sōrin. In many cases the central shaft doesn't reach the ground, but has its base somewhere above it within the pagoda, where it is supported by beam or other means. At Nikkō Tōshō-gū (1818), for example, it is suspended with chains from the fourth floor. From its base exits a long tenon which, penetrating a mortise in a base stone (心礎, shinso), prevents it from oscillating. This structure was adopted not as a measure against earthquakes but because, with aging, the wood of the pagoda, whose grain is mostly horizontal, tends to shrink more than that of the vertical shaft, causing the opening of a gap between the two at the roof. From the gap rain would enter, causing rot.

In other cases, this was done to allow the opening of a room at the ground floor and therefore create some usable space. (Early wooden pagodas had no usable space.)

== Structure ==
=== Wooden pagodas ===
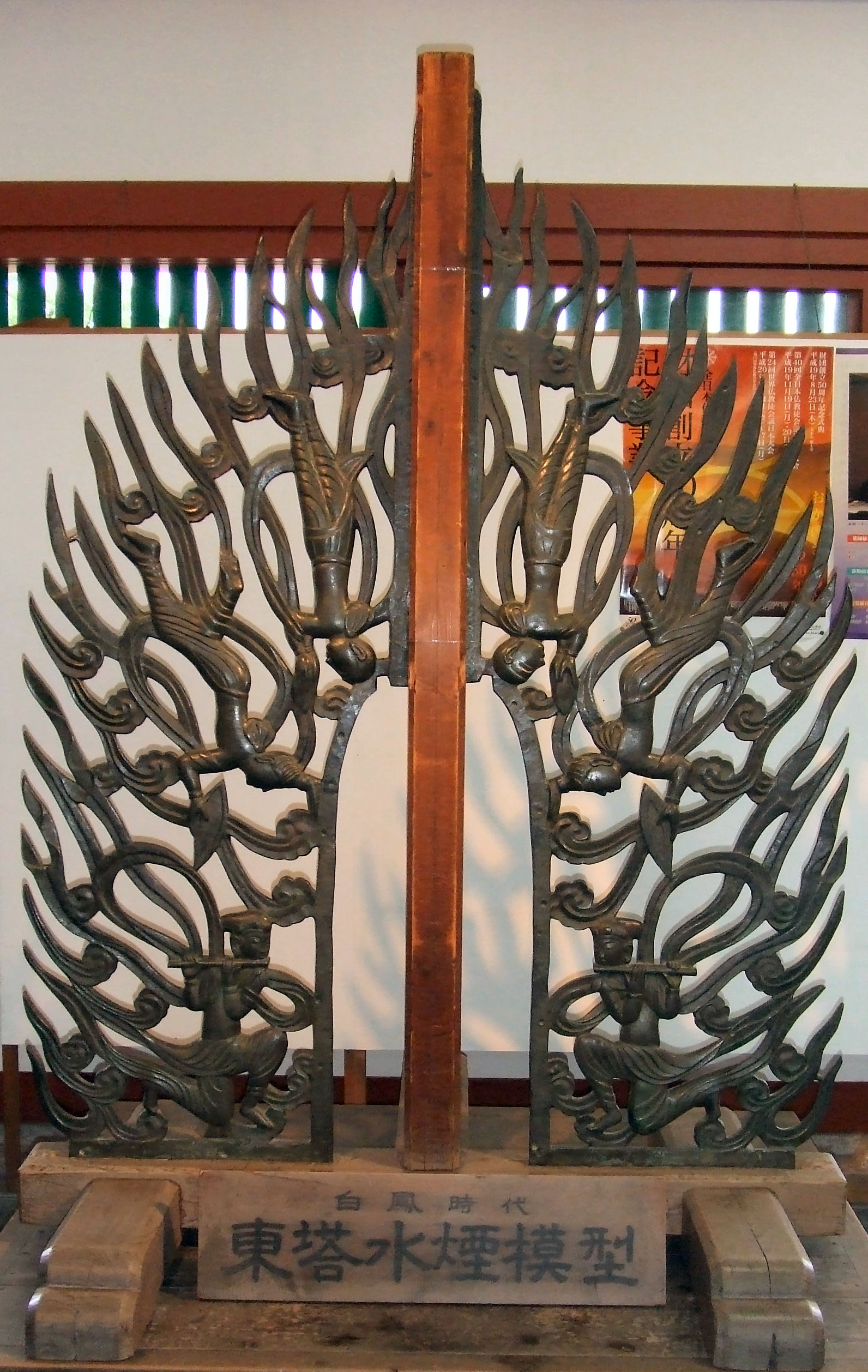
Replica of the suien of Yakushi-ji's Eastern Pagoda

The sōrin of a wooden pagoda is usually made of bronze and is divided in several segments called (from top to bottom):

- The Jewel or gem (宝珠, hōju or hōshu), a spherical or tear-shaped object, shapes sacred to Buddhism. Believed to repel evil and fulfill wishes, it can be also found on top of pyramidal temple roofs, of stone lanterns or of tall poles. It can have flames, in which case it is called kaen hōju (火炎宝珠; flaming gem). Those made before the Momoyama period tend to be rounder.
- The dragon vehicle (竜車, ryūsha), the piece immediately below the hōju
- The water flame (水煙, suien; lit. "water smoke"), consisting of four decorative sheets of metal set at 90° to each other and installed over the top of the main pillar of a pagoda.
- The fūtaku (風鐸; lit. "wind bell"), small bells attached to the edges of a sōrin's rings or of the suien.
- The nine rings (九輪, kurin), the largest component of the sōrin. In spite of their name, there can sometimes be only eight or even seven of them.
- The ukebana (受花・請花; lit. "receiving flower"), a circle of upturned lotus petals, usually eight in number. There can also be another circle of petals facing down.
- The inverted bowl (伏鉢, fukubachi), which sits between the ukebana and the roban.
- The base or dew basin (露盤, roban; lit. "external bowl"), on which rests the entire finial. Because it covers the top of the roof in order to prevent leaks, it normally has as many sides as the roof itself (four, six or eight).

=== Stone pagodas ===
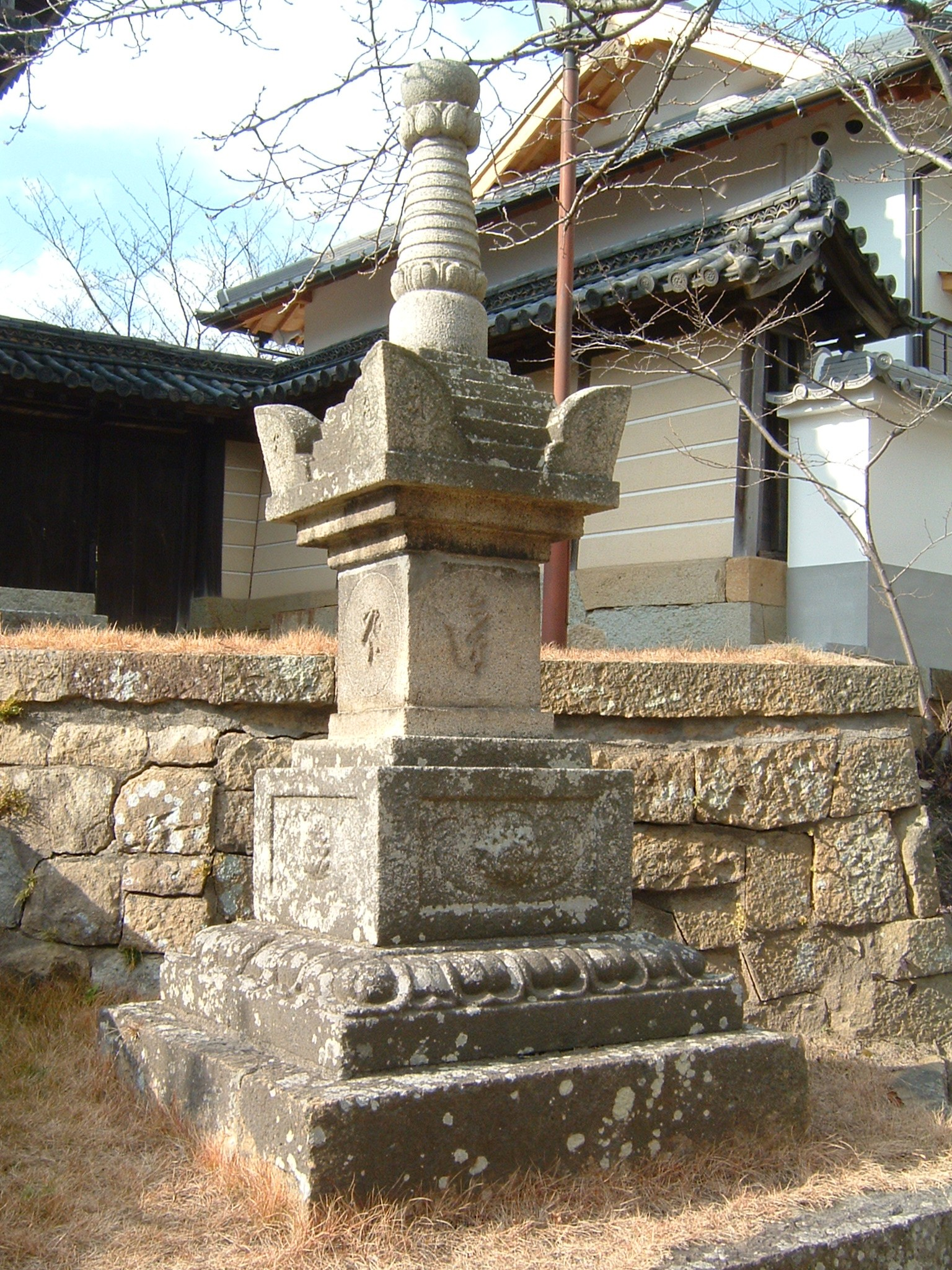
Hōkyōintō with sōrin

The most important stone pagoda having a finial is the hōkyōintō. Usually made in stone and occasionally metal or wood, hōkyōintō started to be made in their present form during the Kamakura period. Like a gorintō, they are divided in five main sections, of which the sōrin is the uppermost. Its components are, from the top down:

- Hōju
- Ukebana
- Kurin
- Ukebana
- Roban.

The sōrin sits on the kasa (笠; umbrella) or yane (屋根; roof), a stepped pyramid with four wings at the corners called mimikazari (耳飾) or sumikazari (隅飾).

== Sōrintō ==
The sōrintō (相輪橖) is a type of small pagoda consisting just of a pole and a sōrin.
