= Meigetsu-in =

Buddhist temple in Kanagawa Prefecture, Japan

Meigetsu-in 明月院
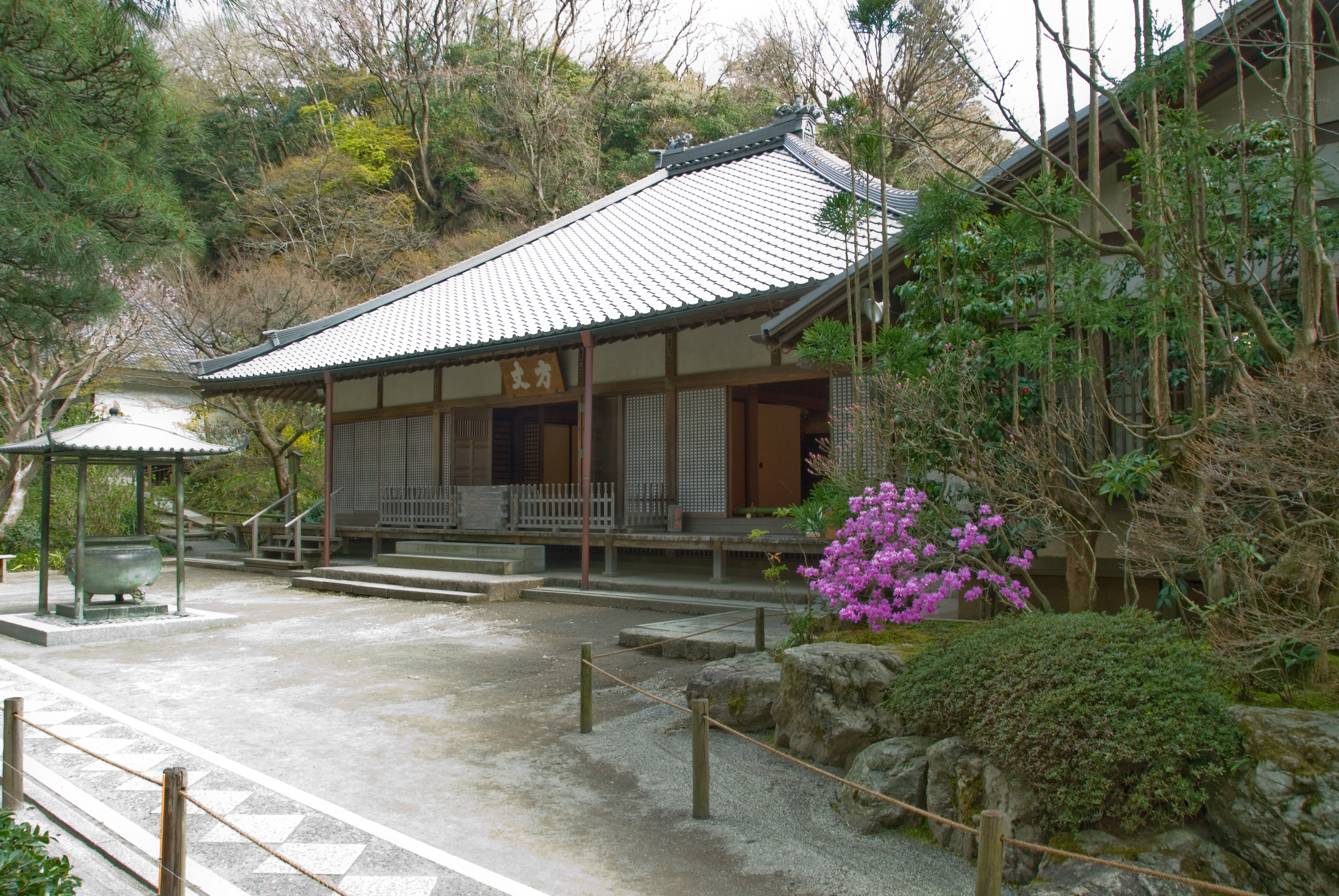
- Main Hall

Religion
- Affiliation: Kenchō-ji Rinzai
- Deity: Shō Kannon (Avalokiteśvara)

Location
- Location: 189 Yamanouchi, Kamakura, Kanagawa Prefecture
- Country: Japan
- Interactive map of Meigetsu-in 明月院
- Coordinates: 35°20′5.97″N 139°33′5.24″E

Architecture
- Founder: Uesugi Norikata
- Completed: 1394; 632 years ago

Website
- None

Fukugenzan Meigetsu-in (福源山明月院) is a Rinzai Zen temple of the Kenchō-ji school in Kita-Kamakura, Kanagawa, Japan. It is also known as The Temple of Hydrangeas (ajisai-dera). The main object of worship is goddess Shō Kannon (聖観音).

== History ==
Meigetsu-in was built by Uesugi Norikata of the powerful Uesugi clan, and the name itself derives from Norikata's own posthumous name (Meigetsu). According to 350-year-old records it was originally just the guest rooms of a much bigger temple called Zenkō-ji (禅興寺) which was closed by the government during the Meiji period. Zenkō-ji was a temple of considerable prestige, being one of the Rinzai Zen temples classified as Kantō Jissetsu (関東十刹), which were second in importance only to Kamakura's so-called Five Mountains (Kamakura Gozan (鎌倉五山). Zenkō-ji however didn't survive the anti-Buddhist clampdown (Haibutsu kishaku) that followed the Meiji Restoration. Meigetsu-in is the owner of a 13th century statue of Uesugi Shigefusa, founder of the Uesugi clan. He is dressed in the picturesque clothes of the dignitaries of the Kamakura period. The statue is a National Treasure.

== Points of interest ==
- The temple's garden contains one of the celebrated Ten Wells of Kamakura (鎌倉十の井), the Kame no I (瓶の井)
- The karesansui, a garden of raked sand, rocks and plants representing legendary Buddhist Mount Shumi.
- The yagura cave dug on the side of a hill is the largest in Kamakura. The small tower at its center is thought to be Norikata's tomb
- Hōjō Tokiyori's grave
- The hydrangeas in the garden. The flowers are apparently just a recent addition. They were reportedly chosen because of the ease with which they grow.

== Directions ==
- Get off at JR Yokosuka Line's Kita-Kamakura Station. Walk about ten minutes towards Kamakura on the left side of the train tracks following the signs. Meigetsu-in is on a side street to your left.

== Gallery ==
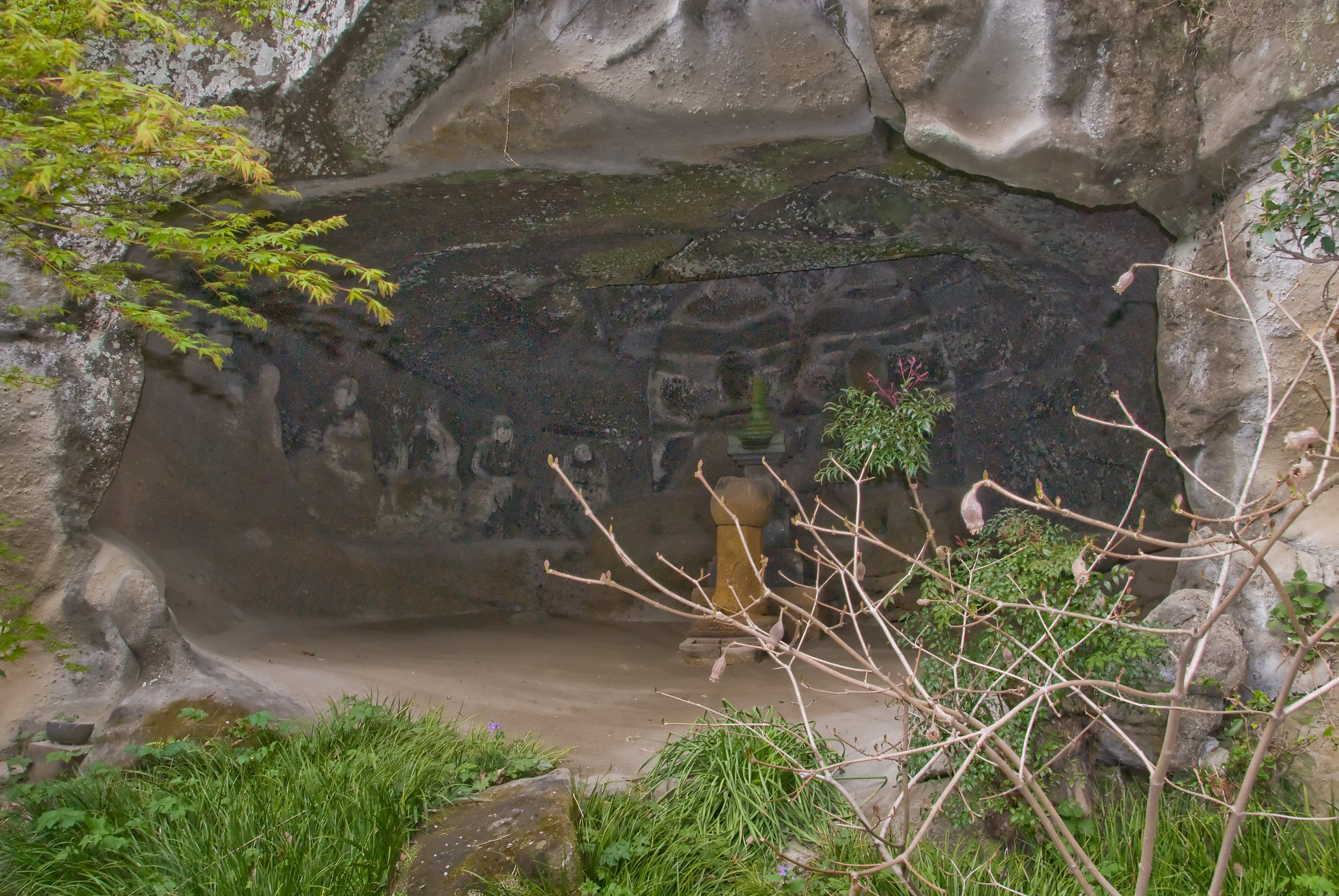
The Yagura. Visible are the figures of the so-called 16 Arhats.

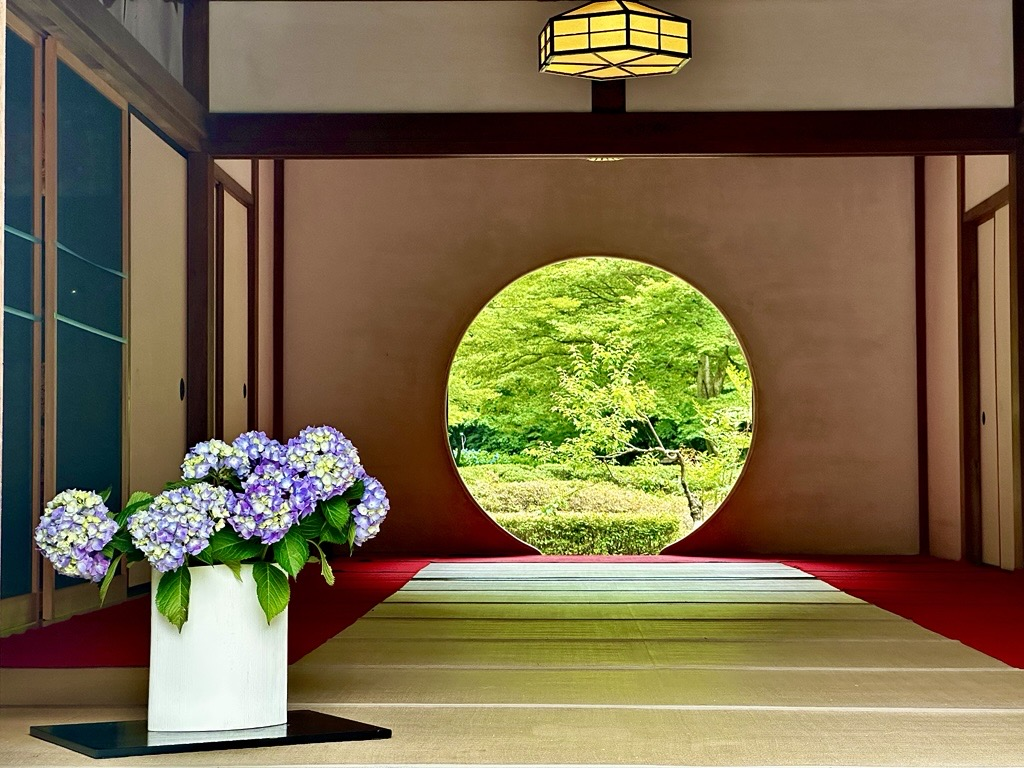
Hydrangea blossoms and Satori no Mado

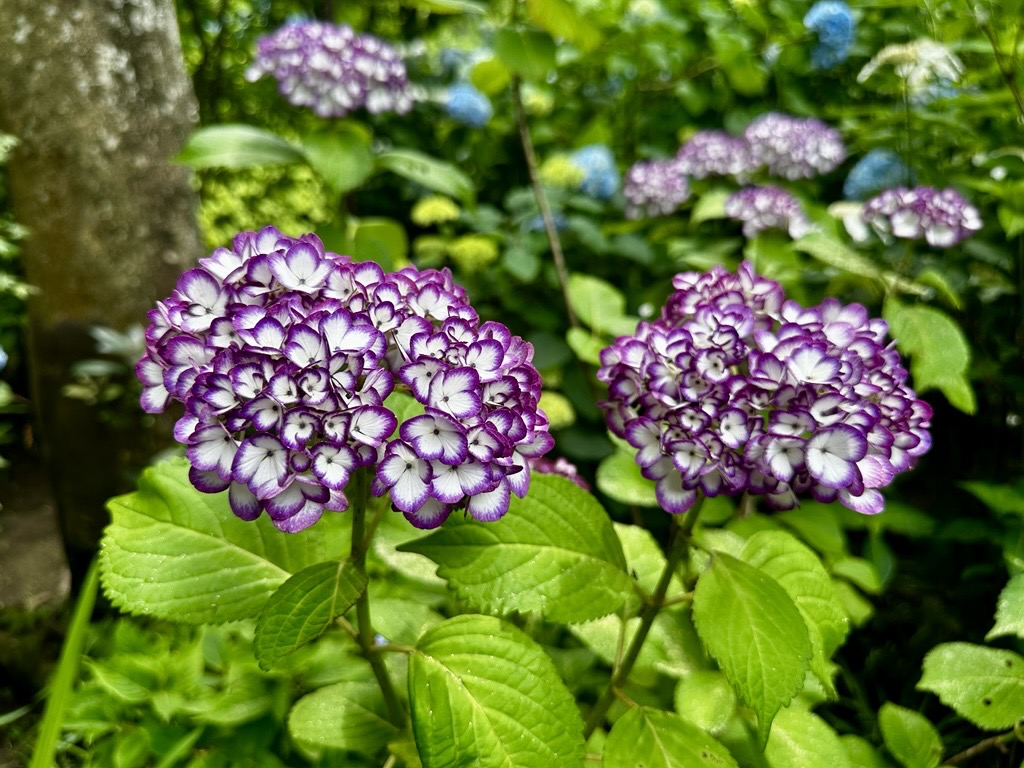
Unique blossoms at Meigetsu-in

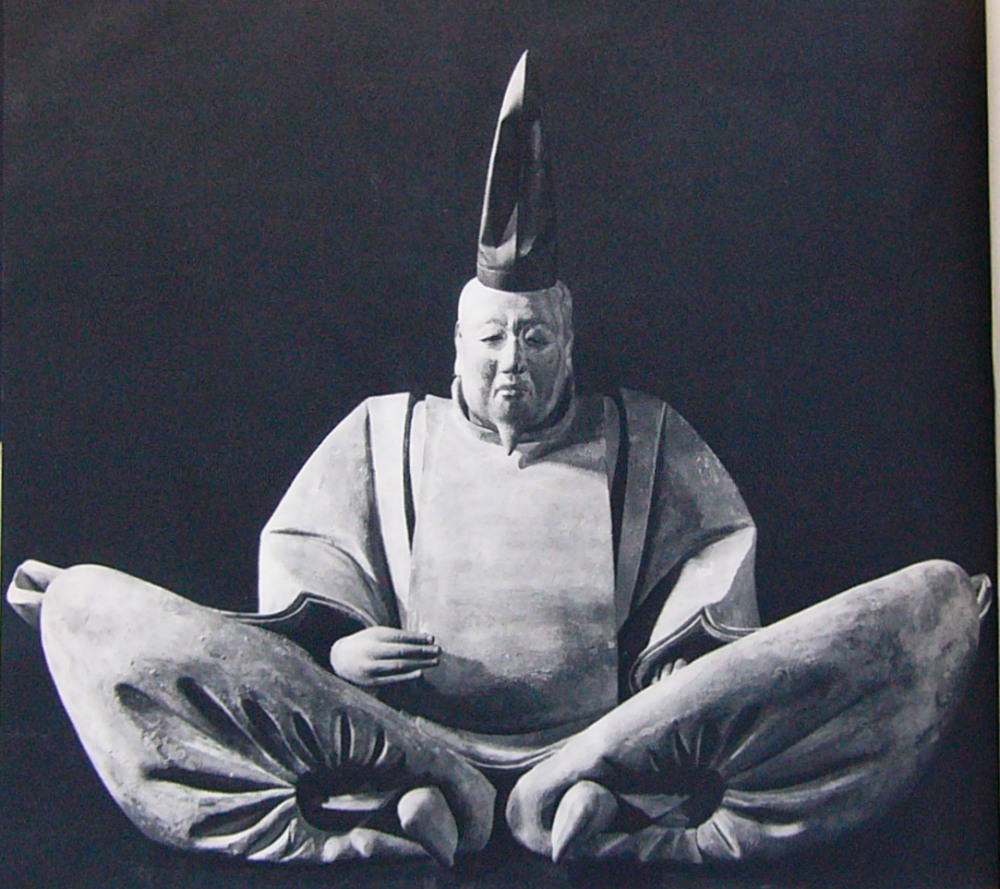
Uesugi Shigefusa's statue, a National Treasure

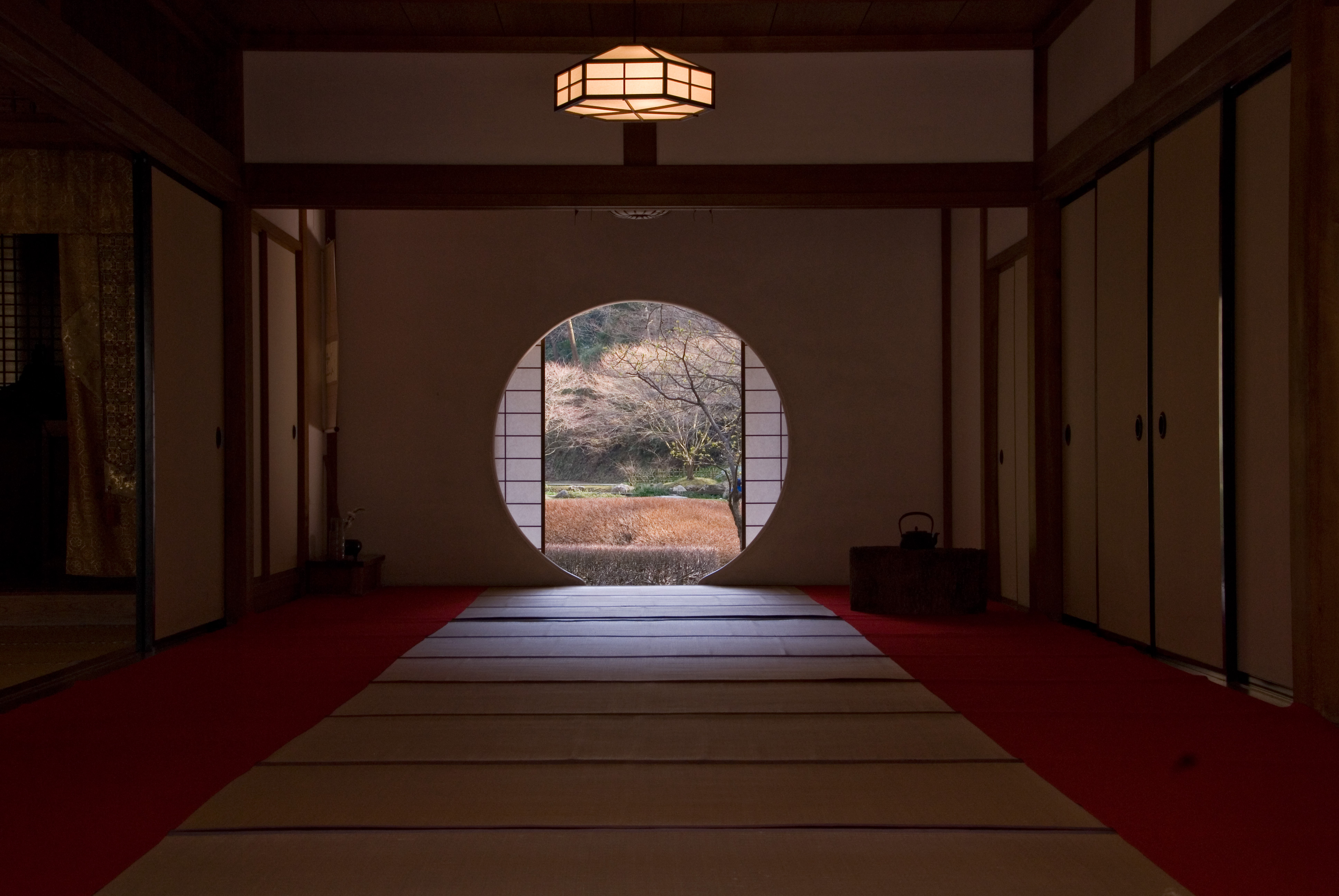
Satori no Mado (Window of Enlightenment)

Several scenes inside the temple during hydrangea season, 2025

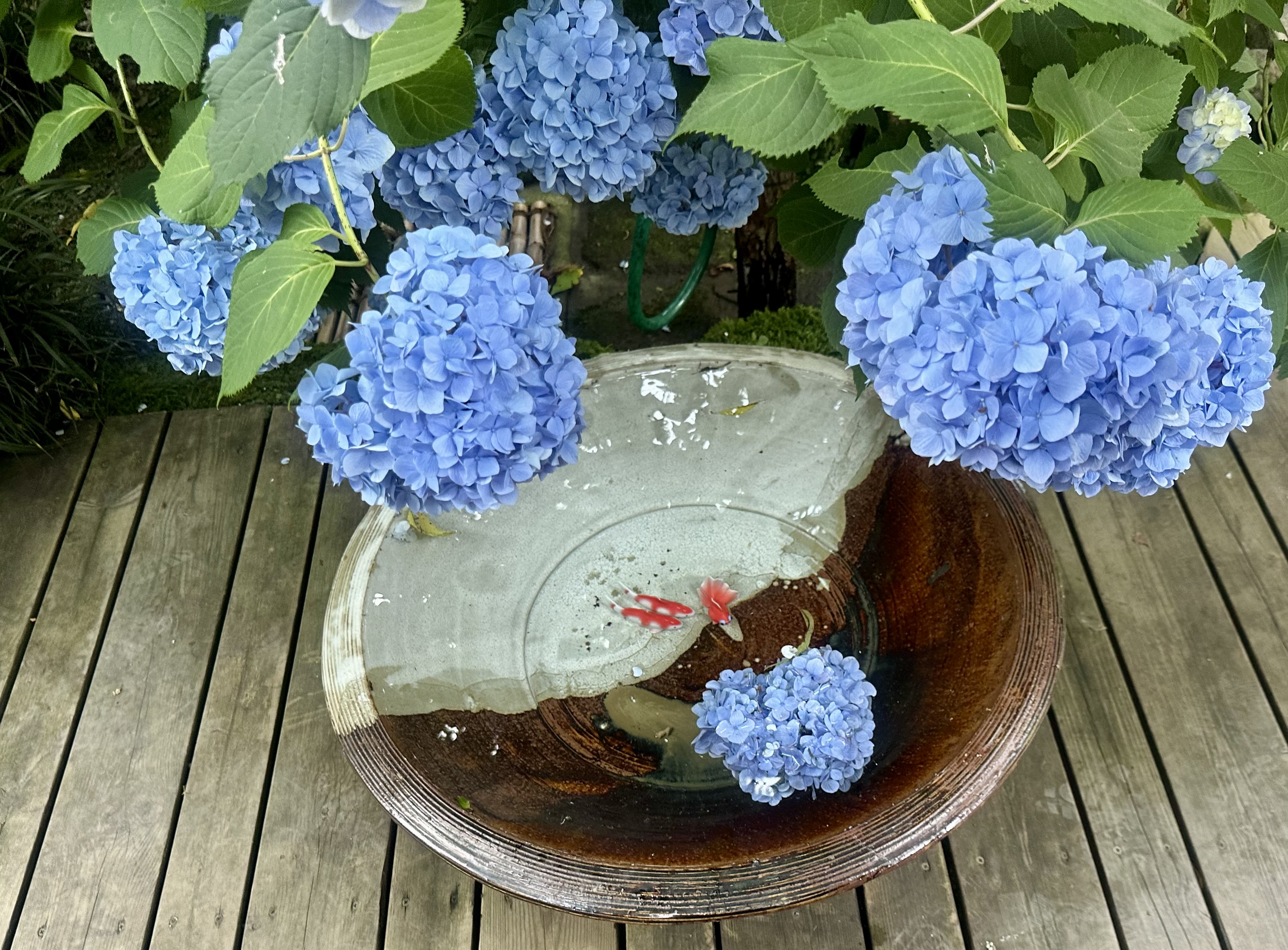
Hydrangeas in the temple

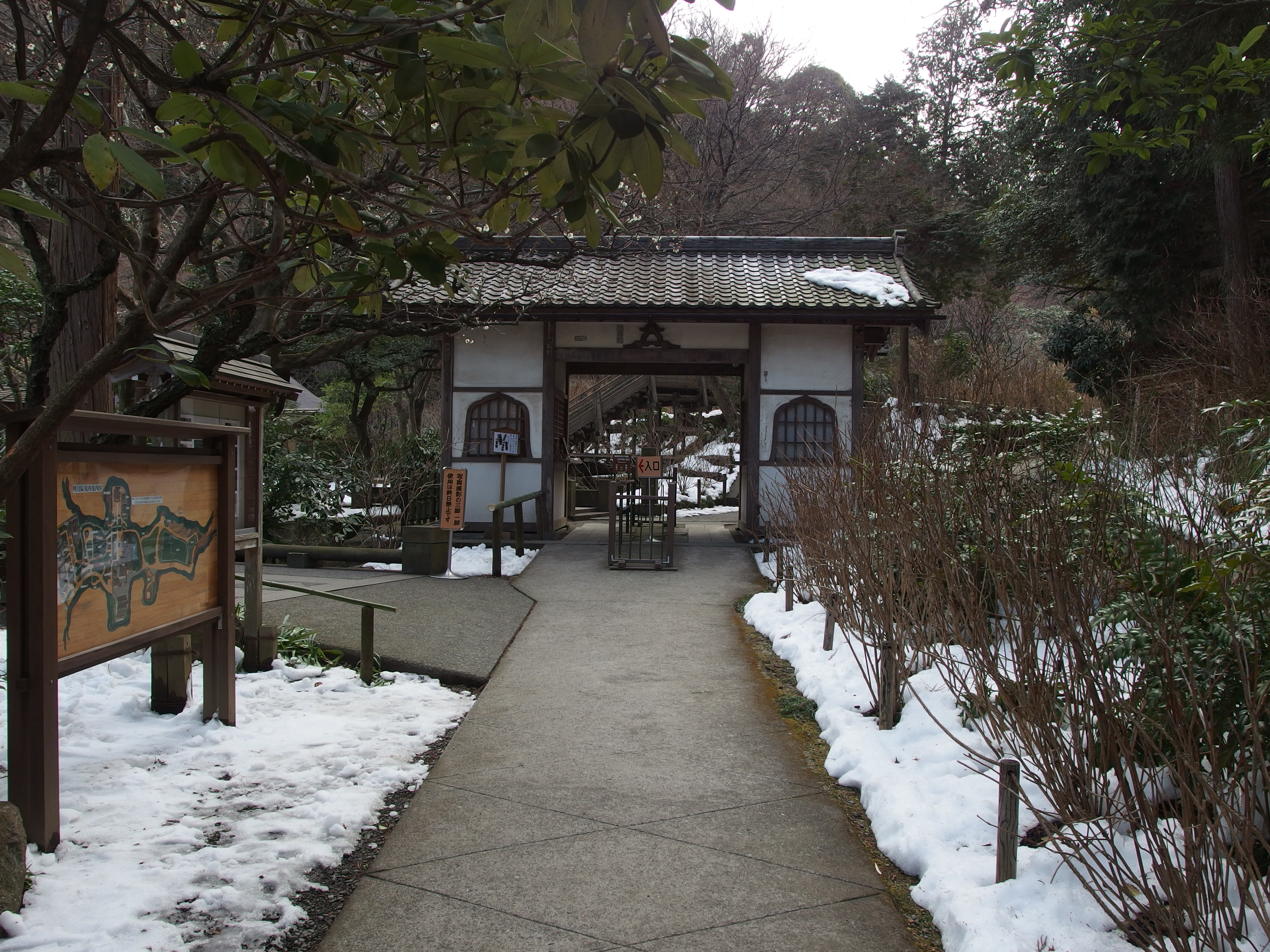
Snowy season

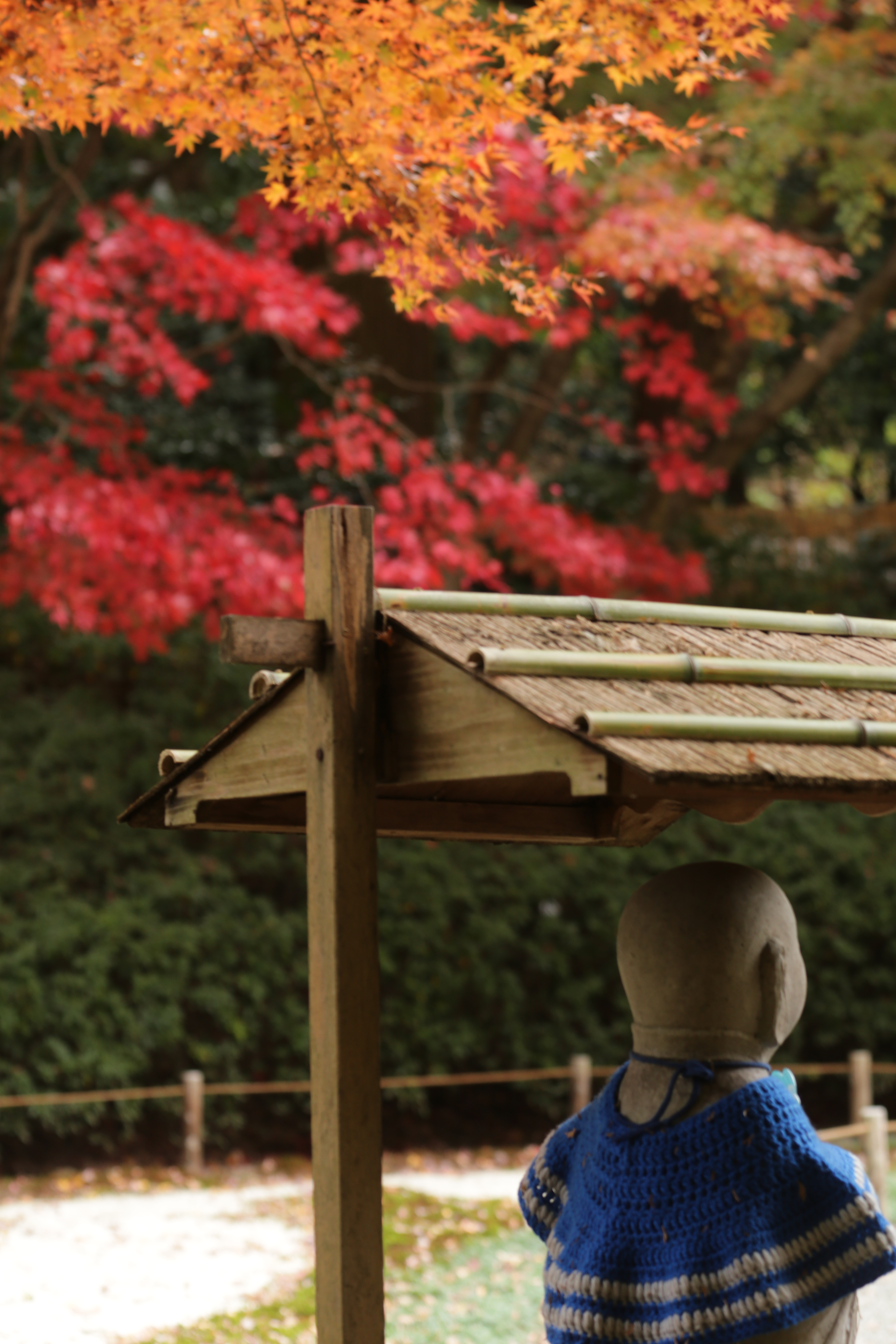
Autumn foliage
