= Yamanouchi, Kamakura =

Coordinates: 35°20′13.60″N 139°32′43.96″E

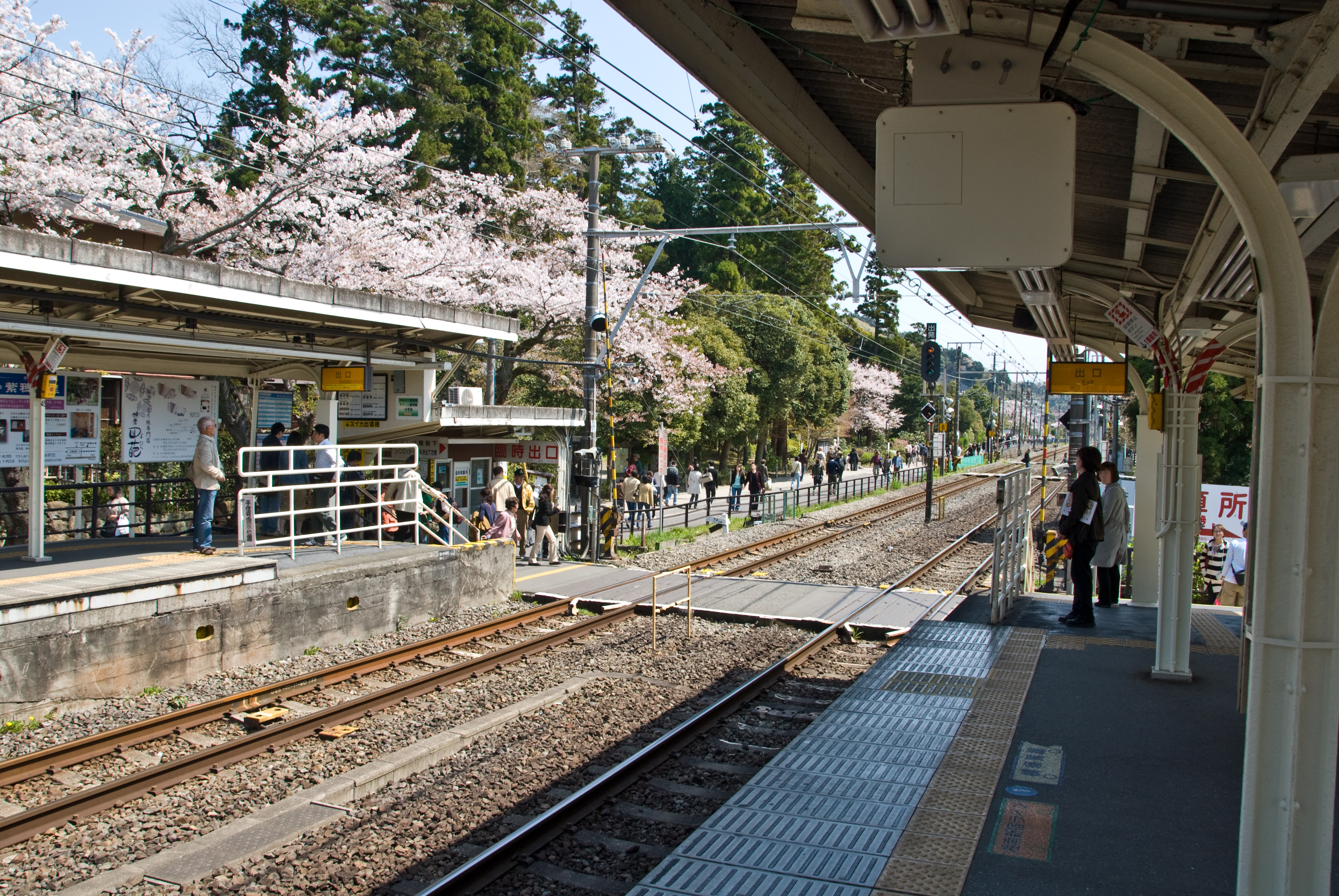
Kita-Kamakura station with its cherry trees in full bloom

Yamanouchi (山ノ内 or 山之内) is a neighborhood of Kamakura, Kanagawa Prefecture, Japan. Because of the presence of East Japan Railway Company's (JR) Kita-Kamakura Station, it is better known as Kita-Kamakura. It lies within the Ofuna administrative subdivision of the city of Kamakura.

== History ==
Yamanouchi used to be the northern border of the city during the shogunate. The border post was about a hundred meters from today's Ōfuna Station. The name of the area during the Kamakura shogunate used to be Sakado-gō (尺度郷). During the Muromachi period Yamanouchi also gave its name to the Yamanouchi branch of the Uesugi clan.

The land where the station itself stands used to be part of Engaku-ji, but it was expropriated during the Meiji period to let the Yokosuka Line pass through. The area nonetheless has not changed much, and is still visually an integral part of the temple. Within it, under the road next to the bridge on the Meigetsu river, was buried a famous and magical stele, the Seimeiseki (晴明石). According to the legend, it was buried there in Heian times by Abe no Seimei as an offering. It was dug up accidentally by US military bulldozers after World War II and now it is kept in nearby Yakumo Jinja.

Although very small, Yamanouchi is famous for its traditional atmosphere and the presence, among others, of three of the five highest-ranking Rinzai Zen temples in Kamakura, the Kamakura Five Zen Temples, or Kamakura Gozan. These three great temples were built here because Yamanouchi was the home territory of the Hōjō clan, the family which ruled Japan for 150 years.

== Notable temples ==
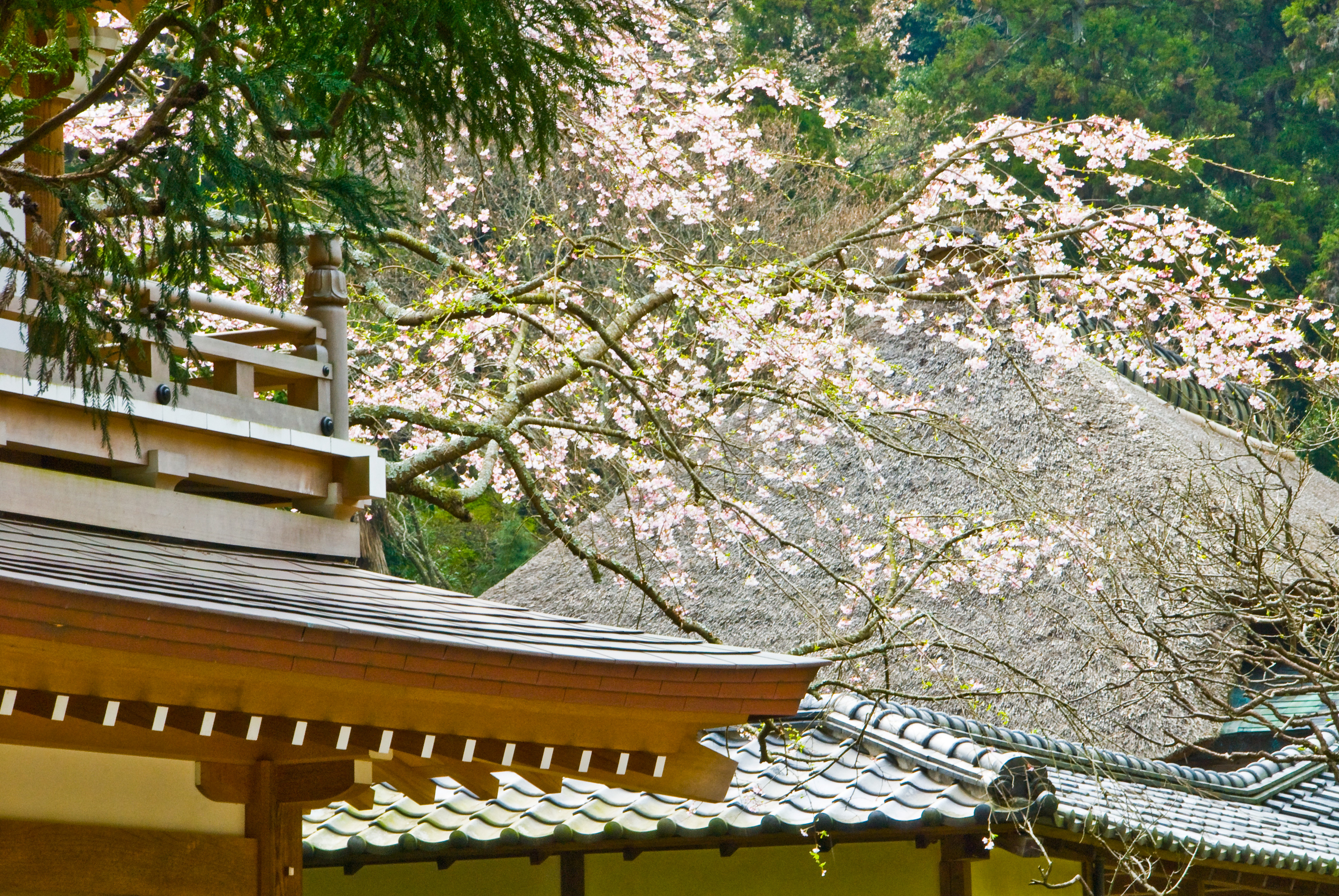
A house in Kita-Kamakura

- Kenchō-ji. This huge temple is, together with Tsurugaoka Hachiman-gū, the symbol of the city of Kamakura. It's number one of the Five Zen Temples, the oldest in Kamakura (built 1253) and one of the oldest in all Japan. The temple bell has been designated a National Treasure and there's a nice Zen garden as well.
- Engaku-ji. Number two of Kamakura's Five Zen Temples, founded in 1282 to commemorate soldiers who fell fighting off the Mongol invasion the previous year. The Shariden building on the grounds is reputed to contain one of the teeth of the Buddha. The movie director Yasujirō Ozu is buried here. Detailed instructions to find his grave can be found here.
- Meigetsu-in, nicknamed "Temple of Hydrangeas" (ajisai-dera) with its round door outlining a landscape which changes with the seasons.
- Chōju-ji, formerly one of the Ashikaga clan's family temples, in 2008 for the first time opened its doors to visitors. Dedicated to shōgun Ashikaga Takauji, the temple's cemetery contains one of his two graves (the other is at Tō-in in Kyoto).
- Tōkei-ji is a nunnery famous in the feudal days for sheltering abused women, who could obtain a divorce by staying here for three years. There used to be in Kamakura a goze system of nunneries, of which this temple is the only survivor. Has a large graveyard. Also called Kakekomidera (the fugitive temple), and famous for its hydrangeas.
- Jōchi-ji is ranked four of the five. Technically a branch of Engaku-ji, it is on the opposite side of the railroad tracks and just a few hundred meters away.

== Notable residents ==
The artist Isamu Noguchi lived and worked here in 1952. Film director Yasujirō Ozu lived near Jōchi-ji from 1952 until his death.
