= Hōkyōintō =

Style of pagoda

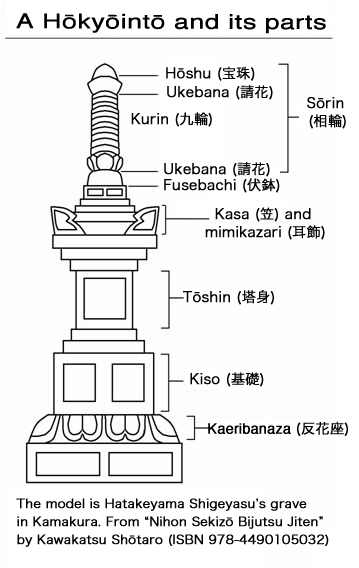
A hōkyōintō and its parts

A hōkyōintō (宝篋印塔) is a type of pagoda, so called because it originally contained the Hōkyōin (宝篋印) dharani (陀羅尼) sūtra (or Karaṇḍamudrā Dhāraṇī Sūtra (宝篋印陀羅尼経)). A Chinese variant of the Indian stupa, it was originally conceived as a cenotaph of Qian Liu, the King of Wuyue.

== Structure and function ==
Usually made in stone and occasionally metal or wood, hōkyōintō started to be made in their present form during the Kamakura period (1185–1333). Like a gorintō, they are divided in five main sections called (from the bottom up) kaeribanaza (反花座), or "inverted flower seat", kiso (基礎), or base, tōshin (塔身), or body, kasa (笠), or umbrella, and sōrin (相輪), or pagoda finial. The tōshin is the most important part of the hōkyōintō and is carved with a Sanskrit letter. The sōrin has the same shape as the tip of a five-storied pagoda. The kasa can also be called yane (屋根), or roof. It is decorated with four characteristic wings called mimikazari (耳飾) or sumikazari (隅飾). Different structures exist, and the hōkyōintō property of the Yatsushiro Municipal Museum in Kyushu for example is divided in just four parts, with no kaeribanaza.

The sūtra contain all the pious deeds of a Tathagata Buddha, and the faithful believe that praying in front of a hōkyōintō their sins will be canceled, during their lives they will be protected from disasters and after death they will go to heaven.

The hōkyōintō tradition in Japan is old and is believed to have begun during the Asuka period (550–710 CE). They used to be made of wood and started to be made in stone only during the Kamakura period. It is also during this period that they started to be used also as tombstones and cenotaphs.

== Gallery ==
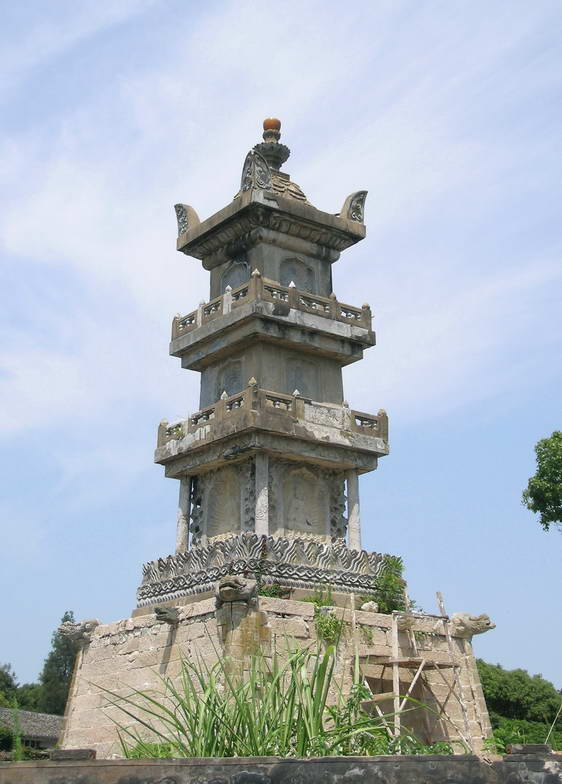
In Mount Putuo

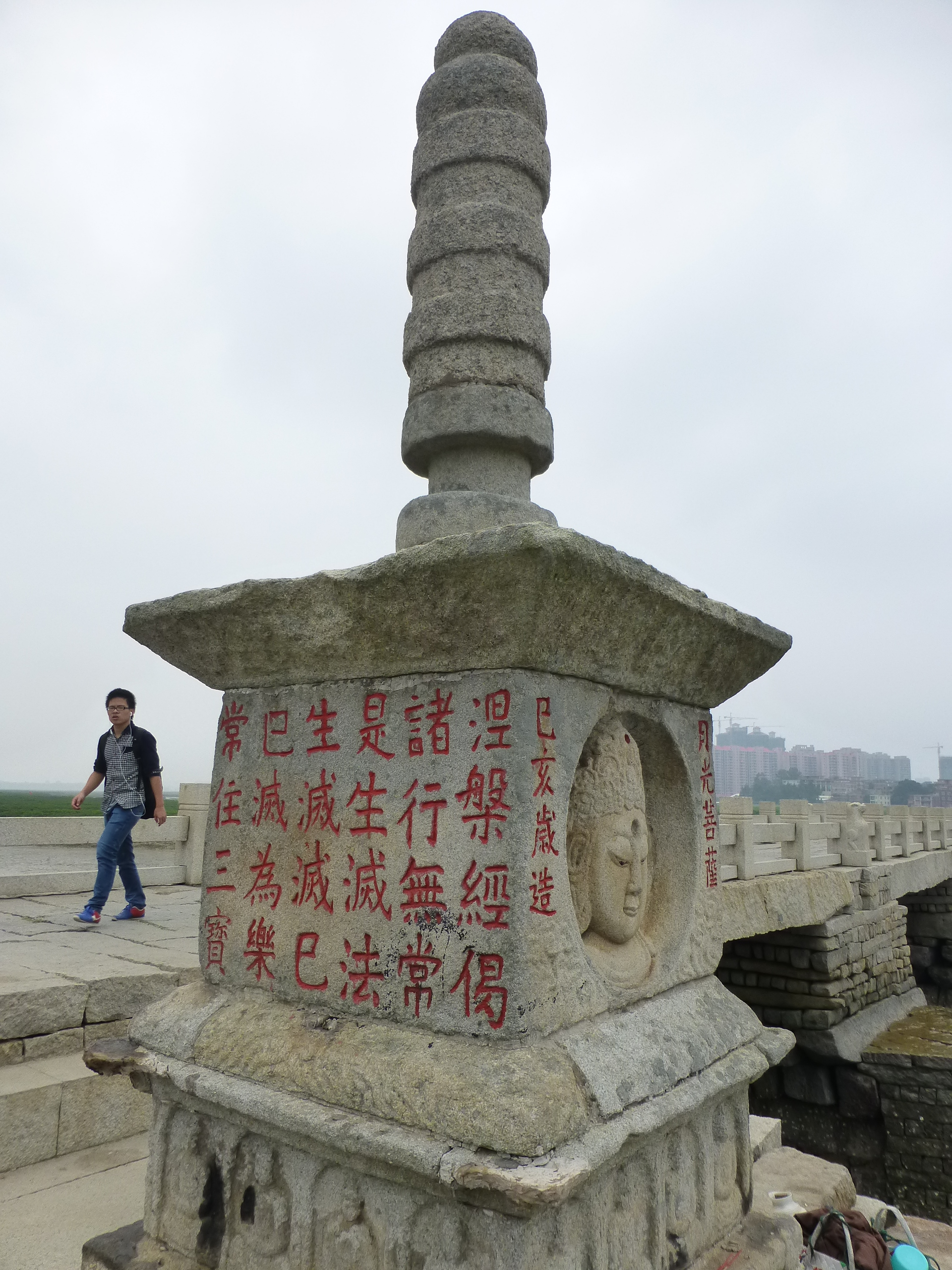
In Quanzhou

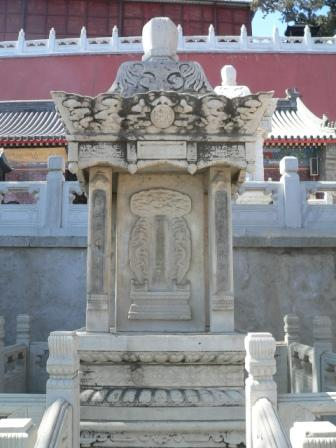
In Beijing

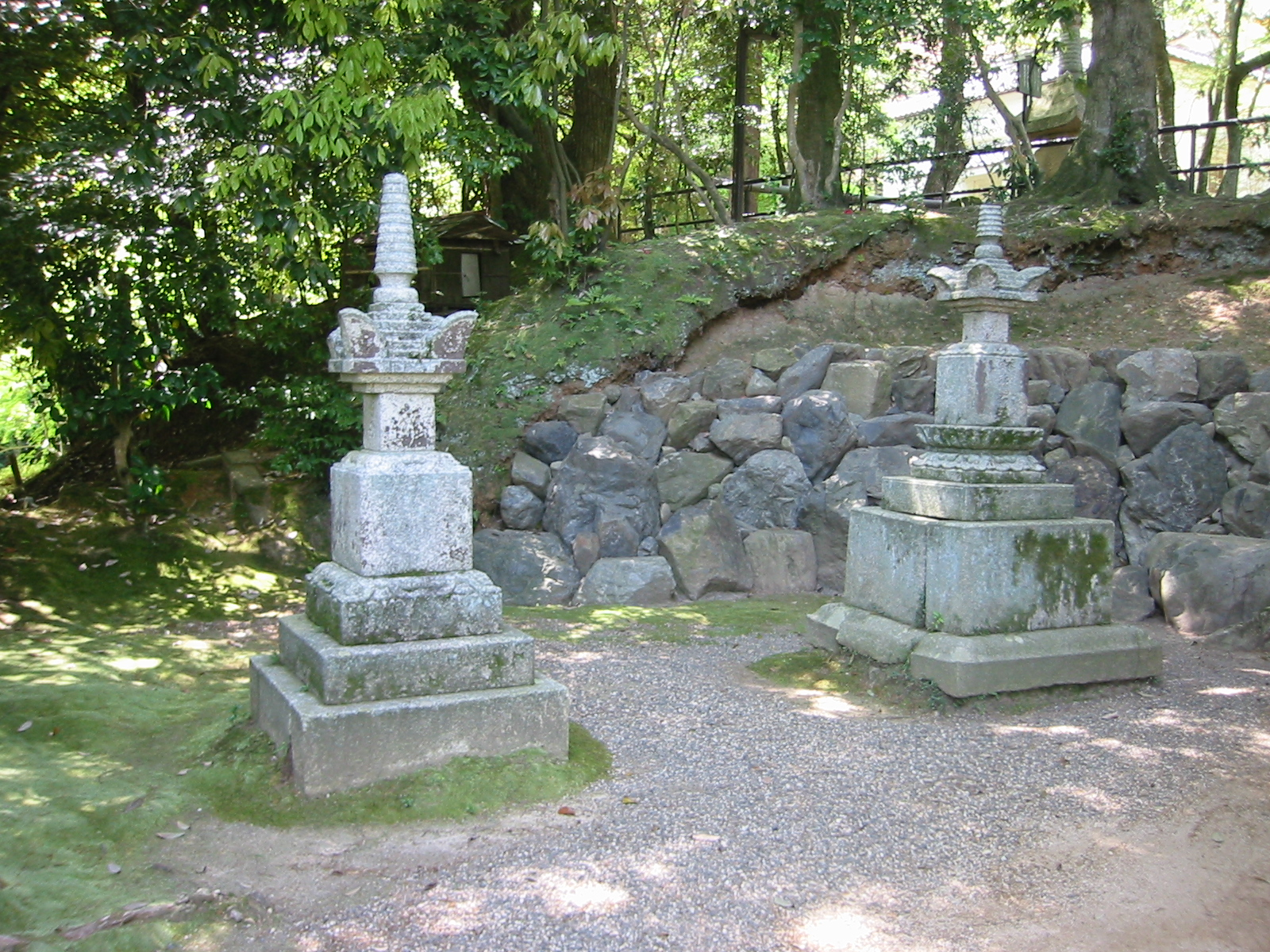
Hōkyōintō at Ishiyama-dera (Otsu)

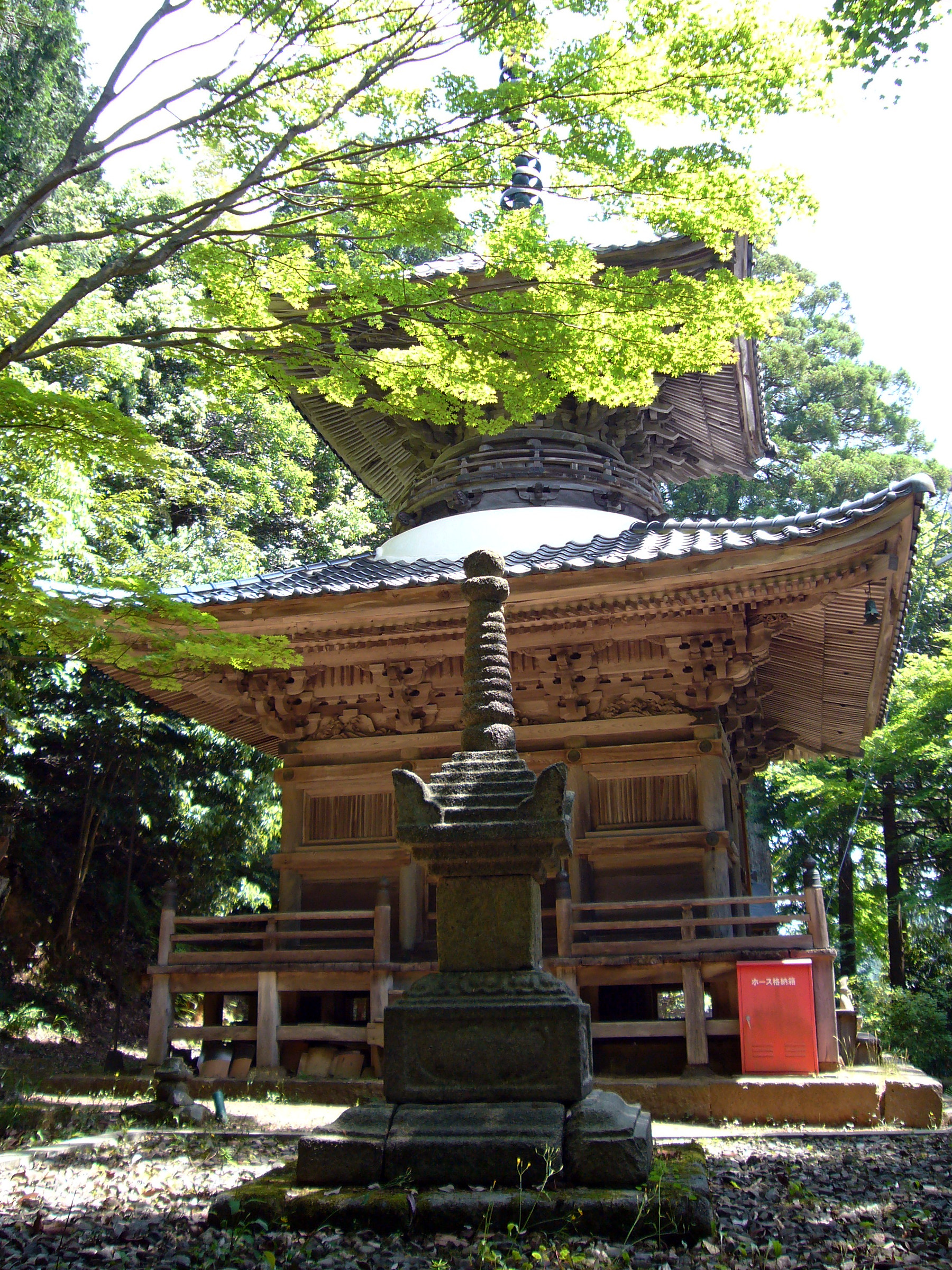
Hōkyōintō at Onsen-ji (Toyooka)

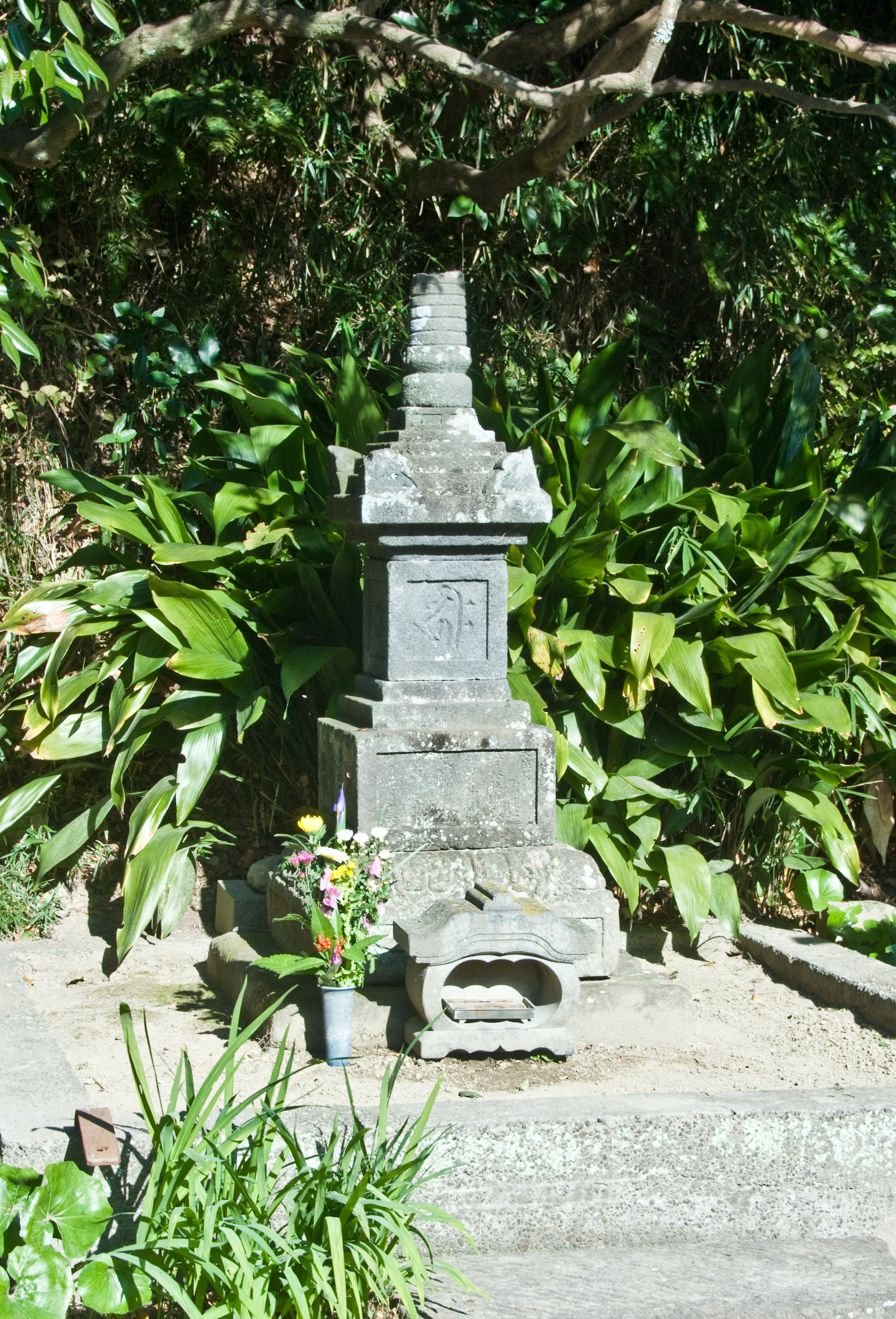
Hōjō Masako's Hōkyōintō (Kamakura)

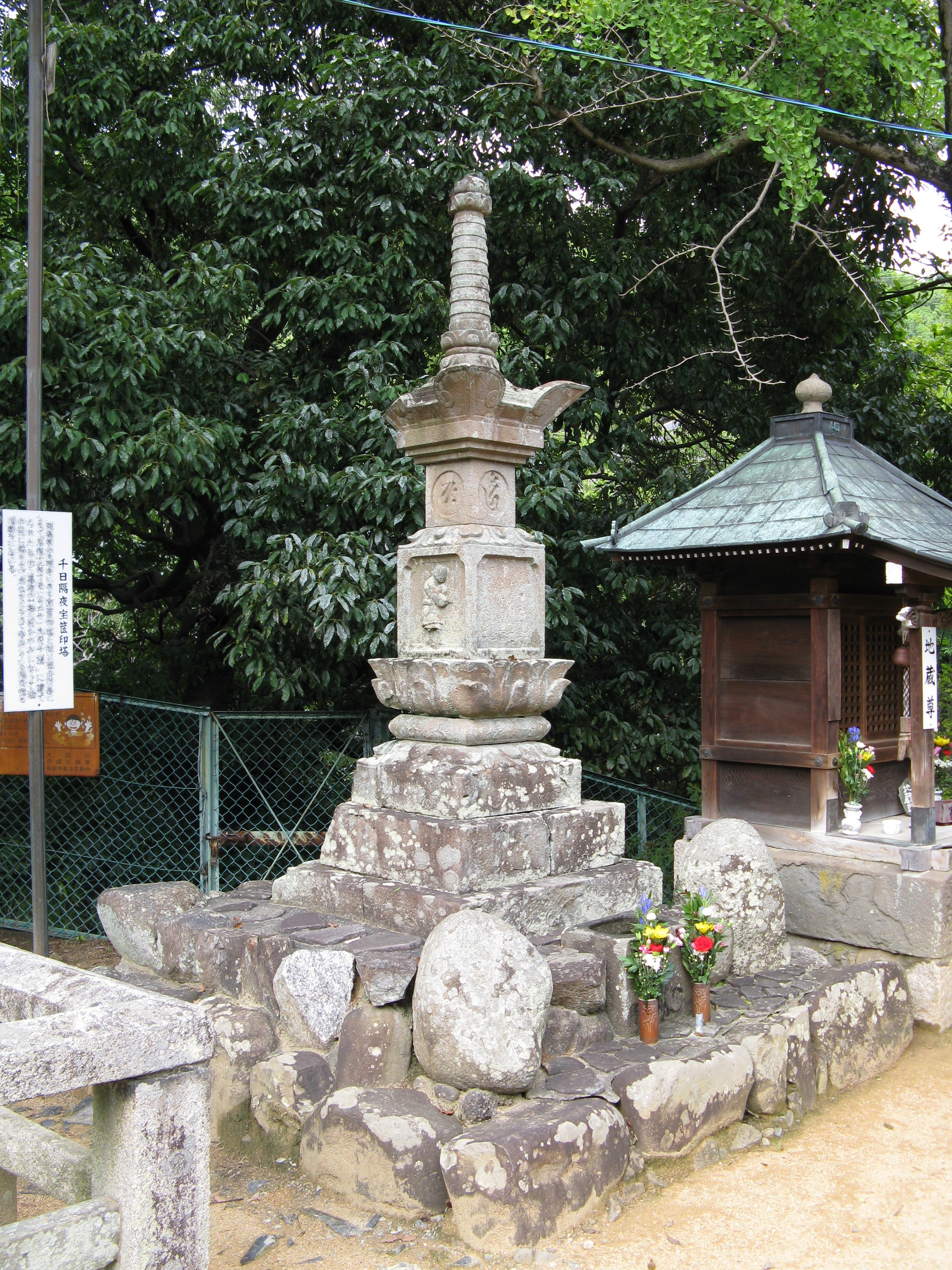
Hōkyōintō at Mizuma-dera near Osaka

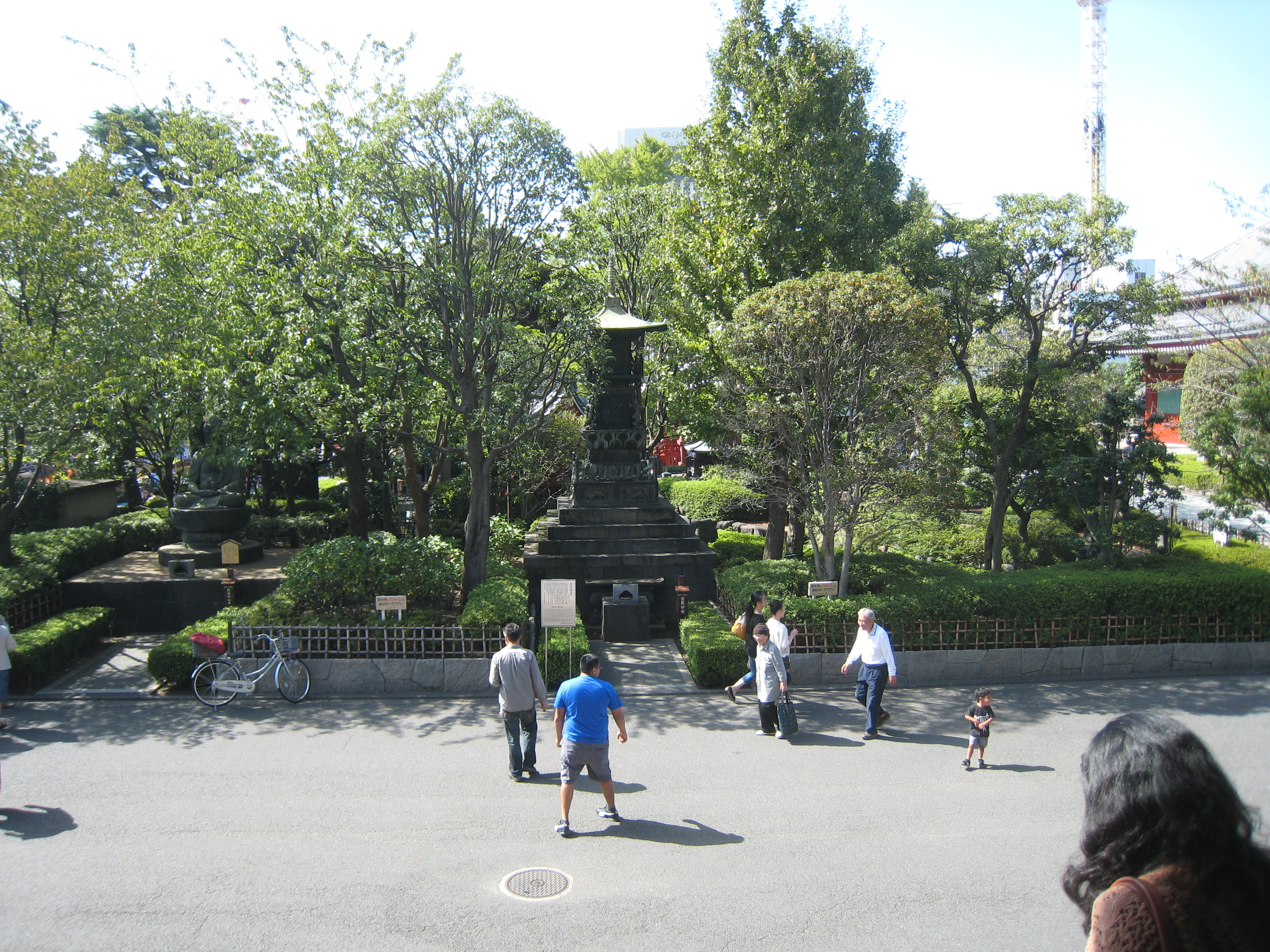
Hokyoin-to in Sensō-ji. It provides evidence of casting techniques used in the 18th century.

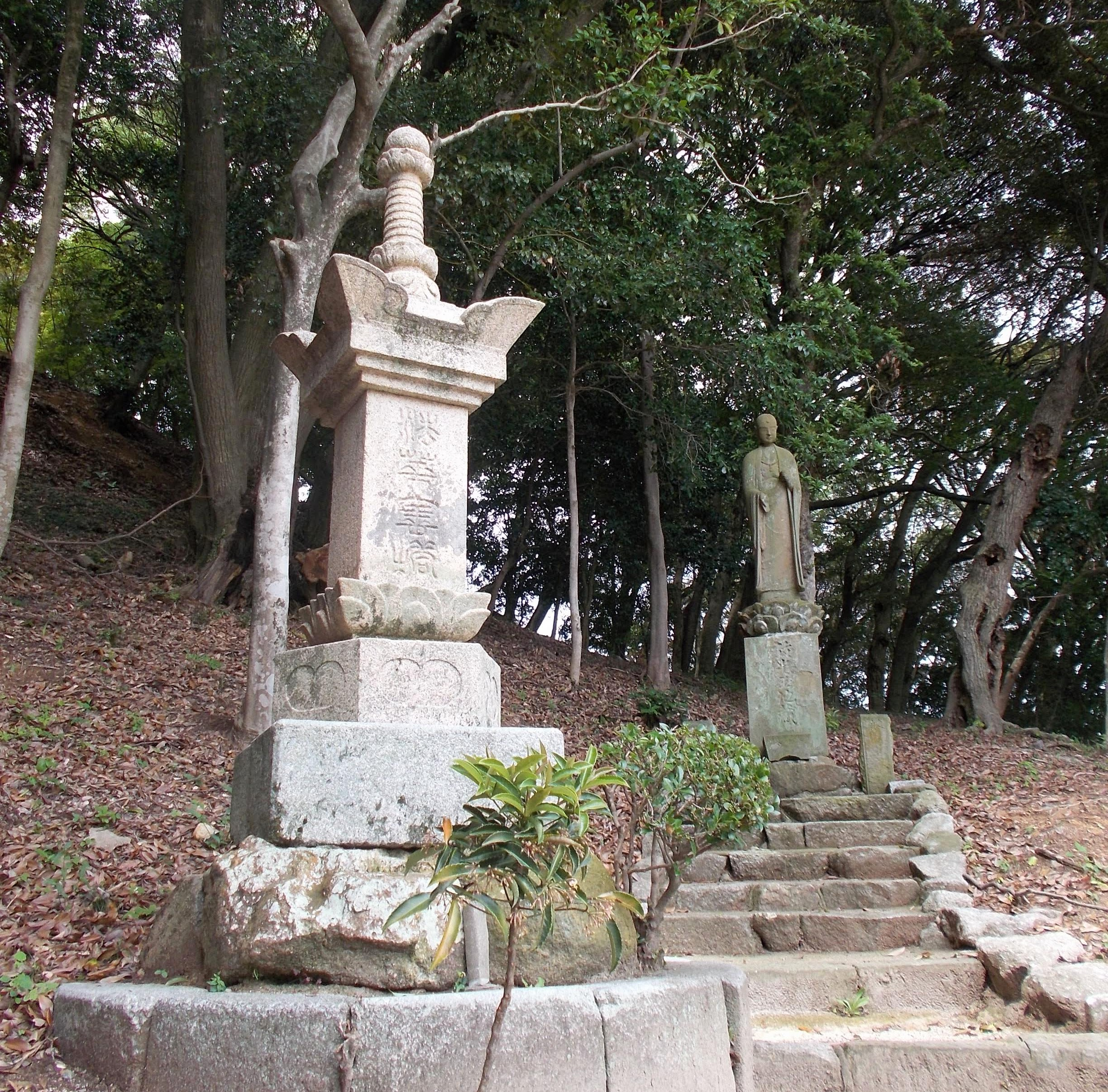
Hōkyōintō at Kōshū-ji (Fukuoka)
