= Kōshū-ji (Fukuoka) =

Buddhist temple in Fukuoka, Japan

Kōshū-ji 興宗寺
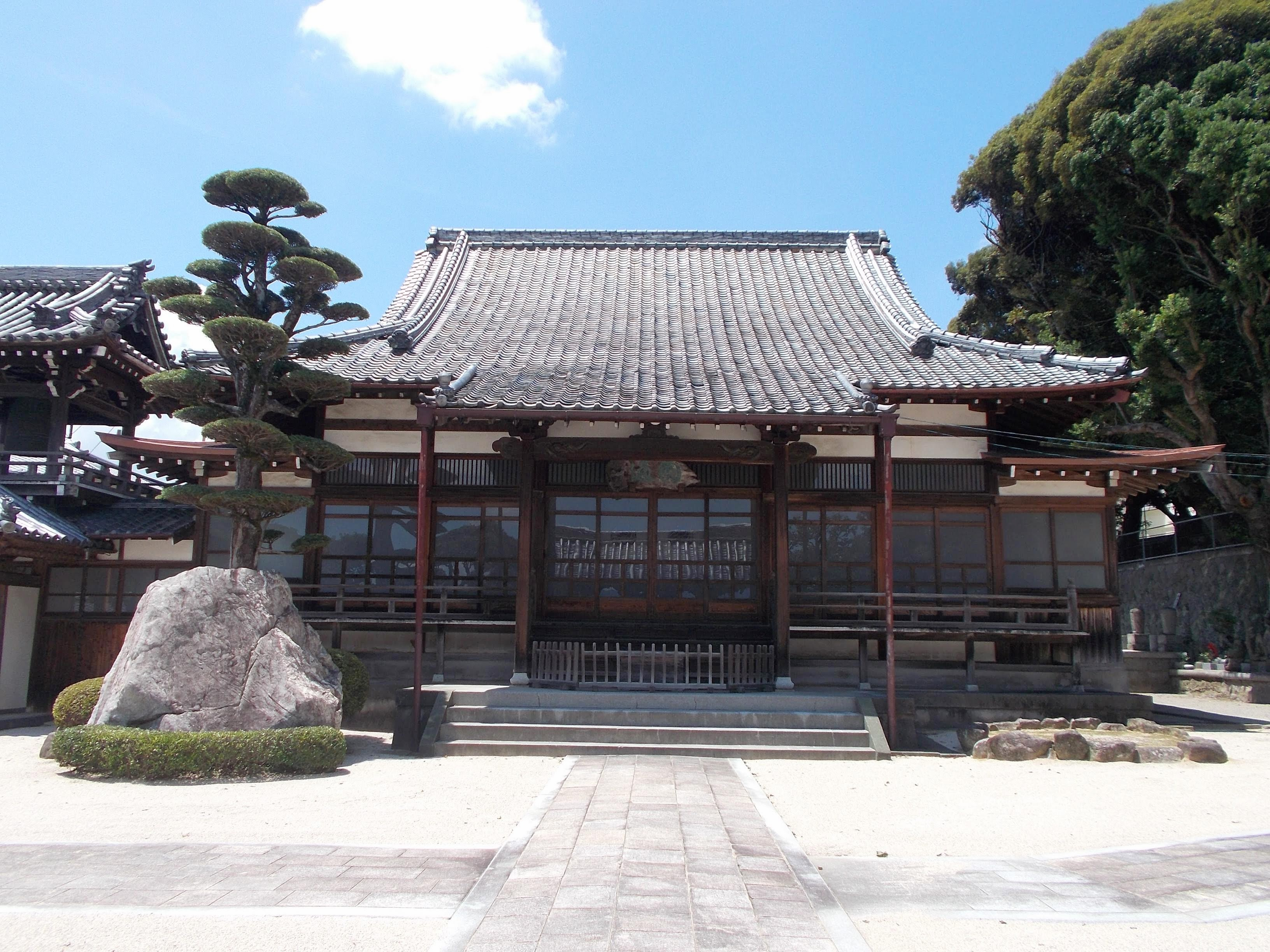
- Main Hall

Religion
- Affiliation: Sōtō

Location
- Location: 2-22-11, Terazuka, Minami-ku, Fukuoka; Fukuoka Prefecture 815-0074
- Country: Japan
- Interactive map of Kōshū-ji 興宗寺
- Coordinates: 33°33′26.60″N 130°24′6.19″E

Architecture
- Founder: Tandō Chōzen
- Completed: 1693

Kōshū-ji (興宗寺), also pronounced as Kōsō-ji, is a Sōtō Zen Buddhist temple in Minami-ku, Fukuoka, Japan. The temple stands under the cavern of Takamiya where the old tombs existed.

== History ==
According to tradition, Kuroda Nagamasa tried to use the carved stone from the temple to build Fukuoka Castle, but Kannon appeared to him in a dream and told him to stop construction. He later found out that a Kannon image was carved in the stone. He decided to stop working and built the hall of worship on the temple grounds. When the temple was destroyed in 1693, the main hall was rebuilt by Tandō Chōzen, the priest of Chōen-ji in Chūō-ku, Fukuoka.

It was originally located in Kumade Village, Onga District, what is now called Yahatanishi-ku, Kitakyūshū. It belonged to Ryūshō-ji in the same district, but was abandoned. Afterwards Tandō took over the temple and relocated the chapel to a new site in the Terazuka district to the south of the castle.

== Anakannon ==
Anakannon (穴観音) is an ancient circular tomb located southward on the right side of the hill on the Kōshū-ji temple grounds. The estimated diameter of the hill is approximately 20 metres. The main part is a double-chambered site stone chamber that opens southward, and is from the late Kofun period in the 6th century. The stone chamber is a made of huge rocks that are one of the largest megalithic walls in Fukuoka. Amitābha is carved in front of the back of stone chamber, and Kannon and Mahasthamaprapta are both on the left and right. The author and the production date are unknown, but it is commonly called Anakannon because of its form.

There were many old burial mounds in the Terazuka area, but it was told that some of the stones were removed from the stone walls when Fukuoka Castle was built.

== Replica graves of the Forty-Seven Rōnin ==
In 1935, Zenjirō Kihara, a private investor, invested his private property and established replicas of the graves of the Forty-Seven Rōnin on the temple grounds. It was done to create a sense of purpose, for health development of youth, and the promotion of a national consciousness. It is a replica of the same style as the actual graves at Sengaku-ji in Tokyo.

Each year on December 14, the temple holds a festival commemorating the 47 Rōnin.

== Gallery ==
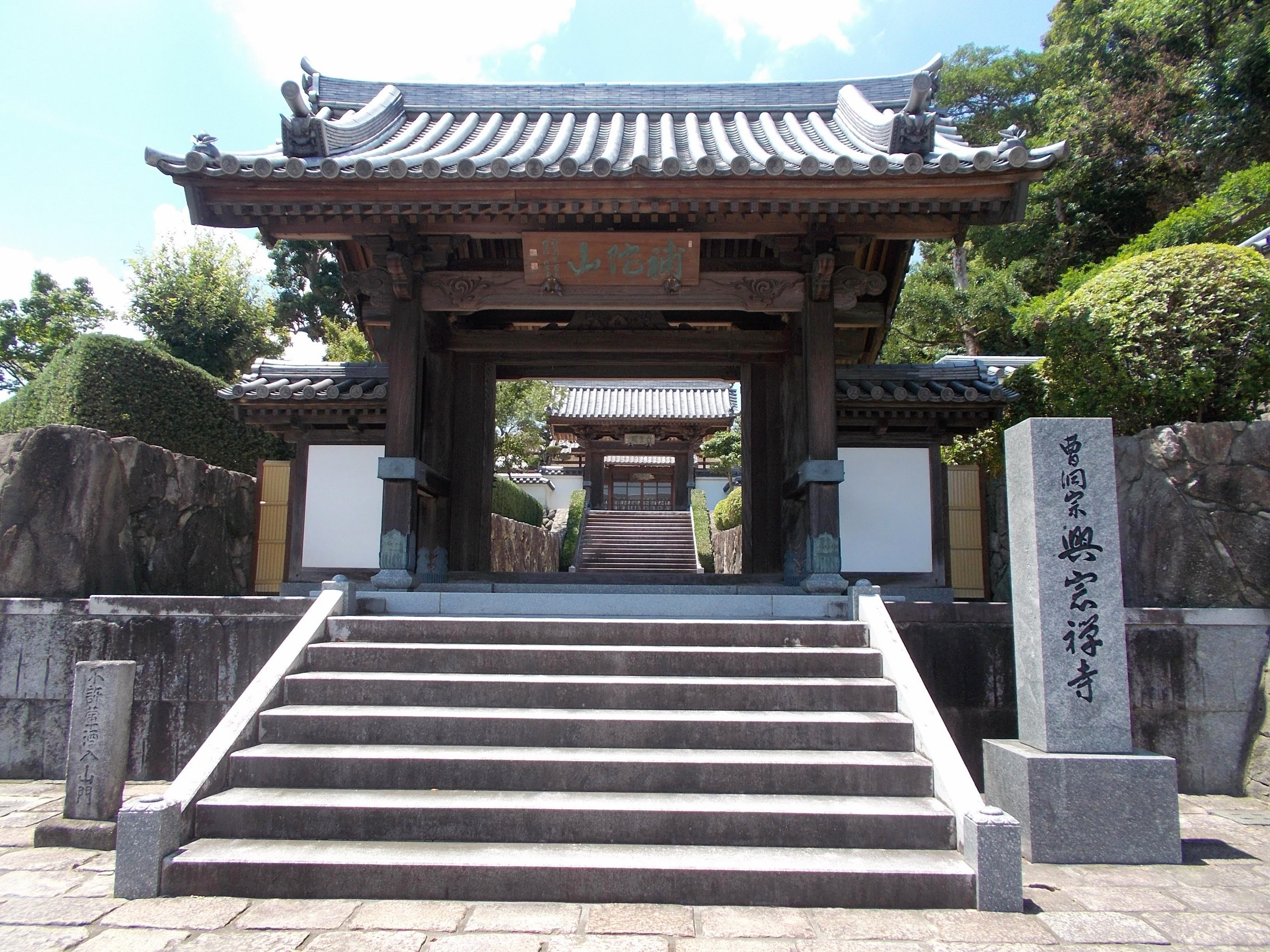
Sanmon

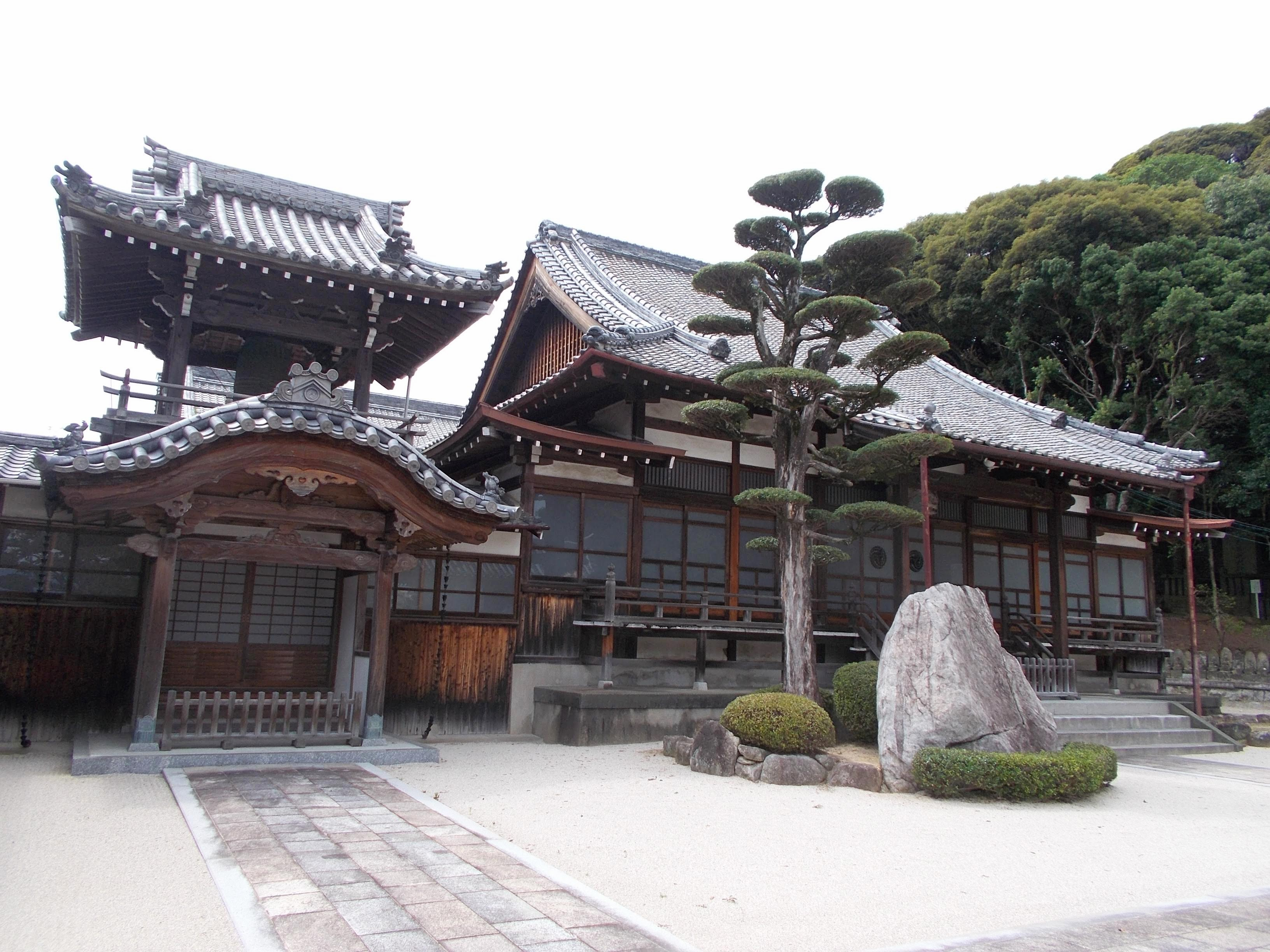
Bell tower and Main Hall

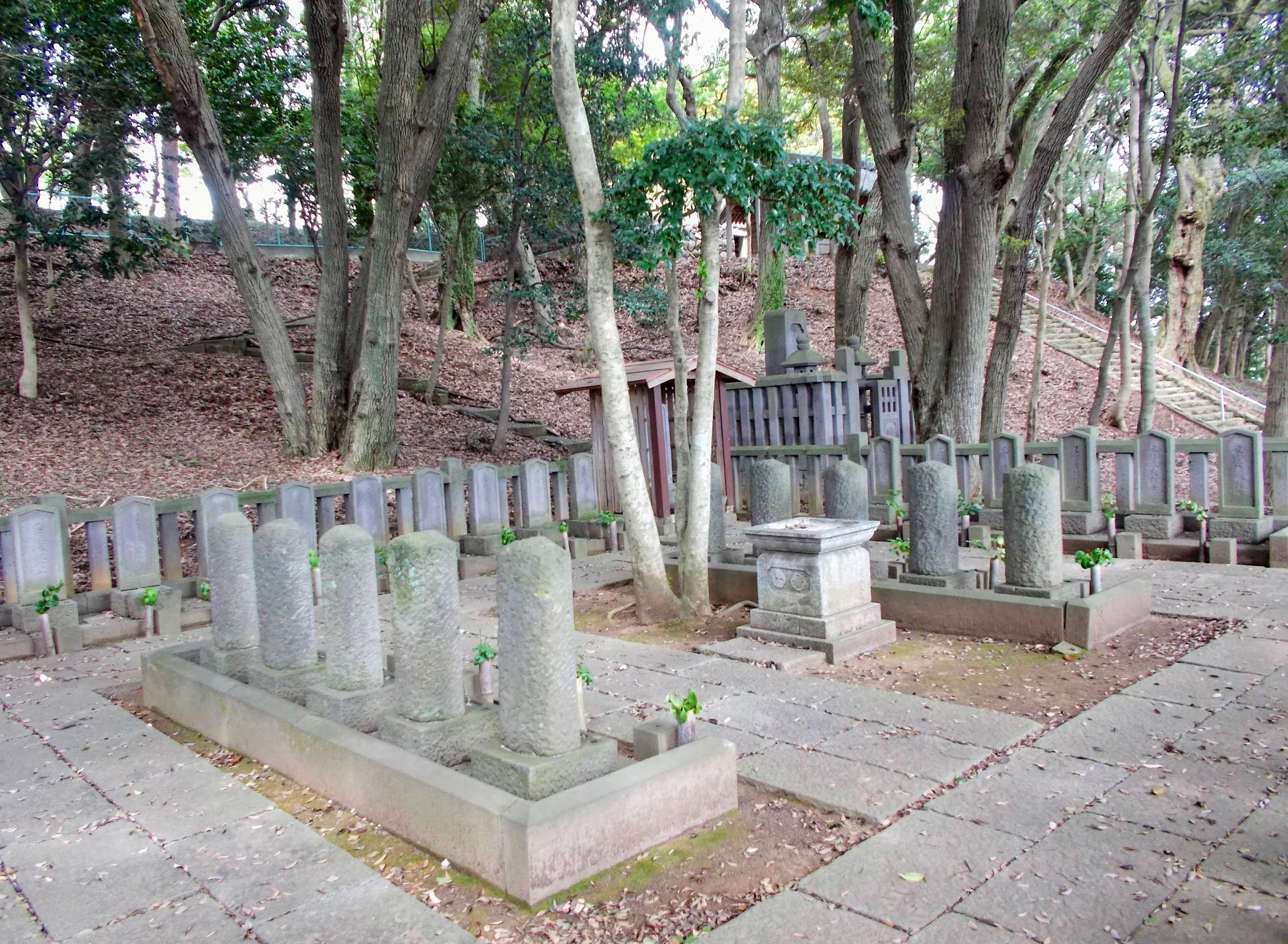
47 Rōnin graves

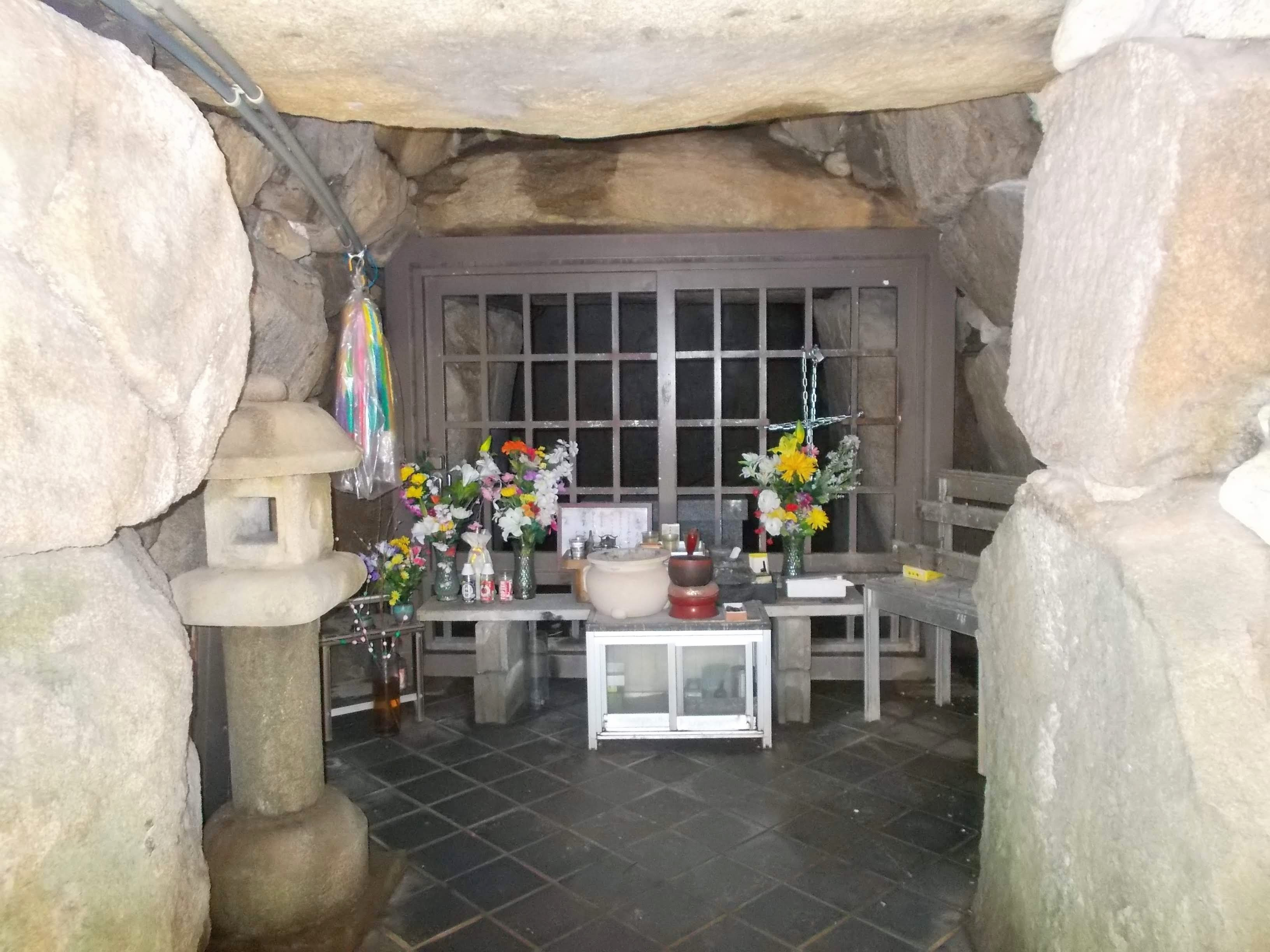
Anakannon

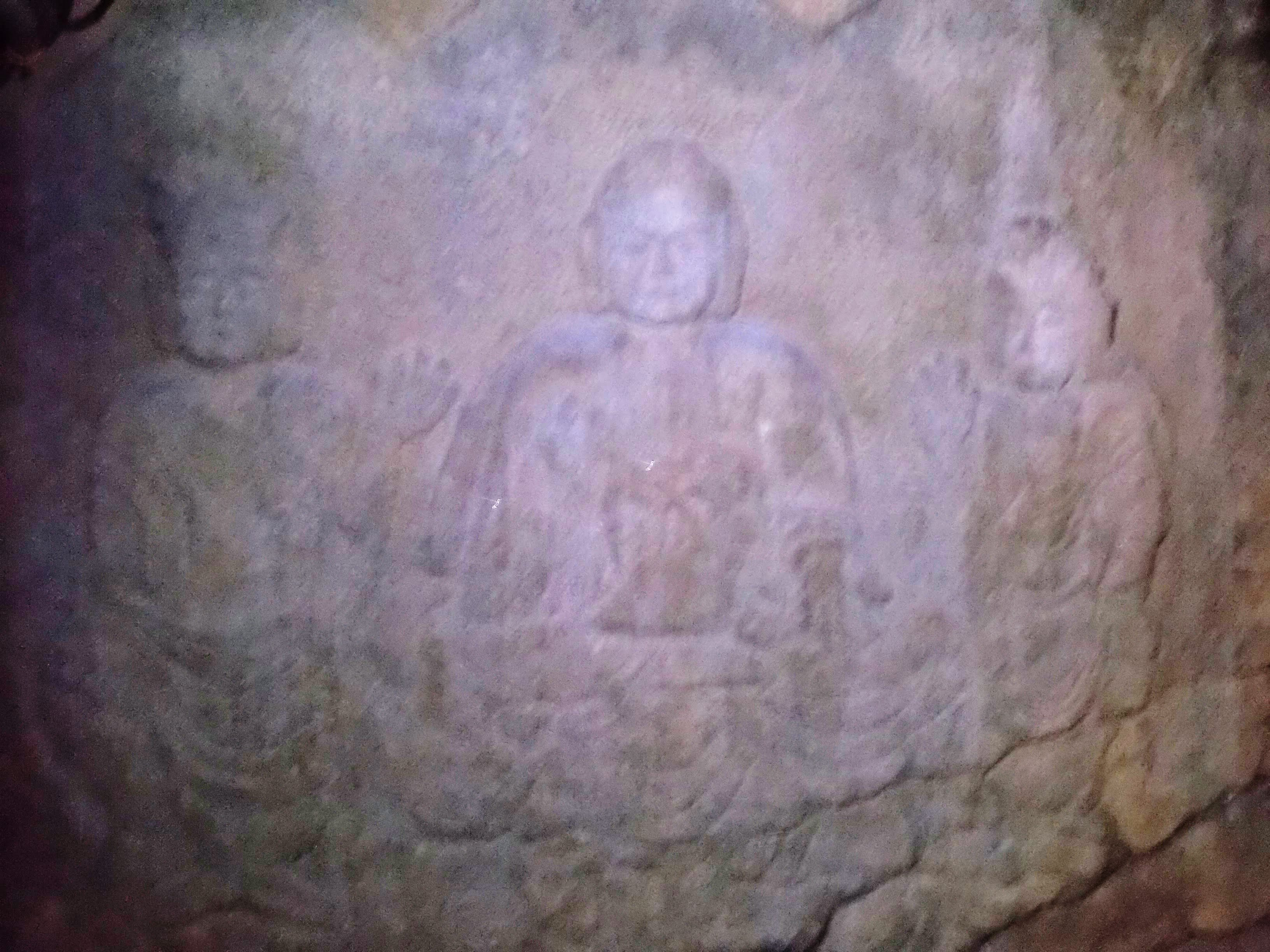
Relief images of Kannon carved into one of the Hyakuzuka (百塚) rocks
