= Higashiyama-ku =

Higashiyama 東山区
- Ward of Kyoto
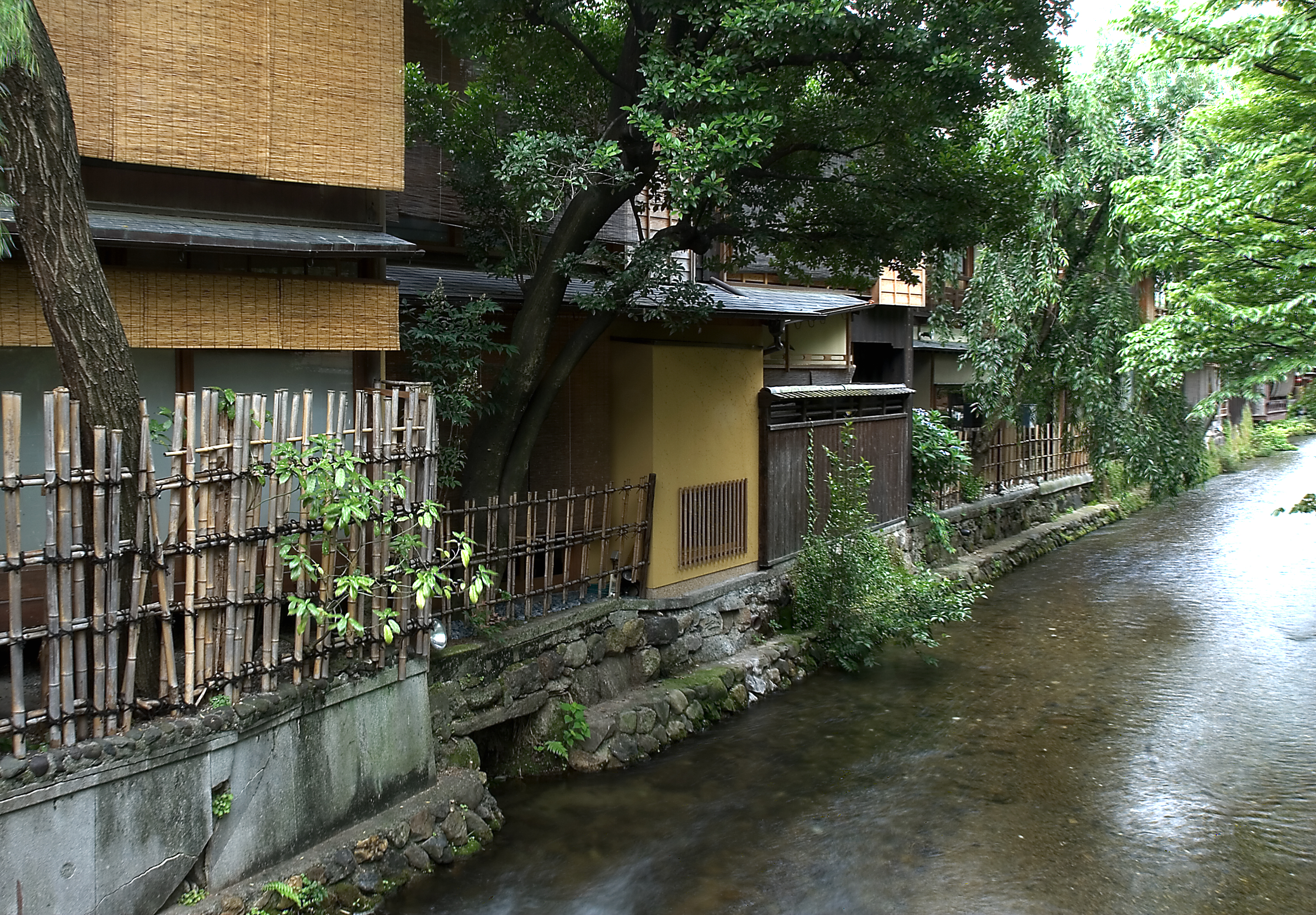
- Shirakawa Canal in Gion, Higashiyama-ku, showing the rear of some ochaya

- Location of Higashiyama-ku in Kyoto
- Interactive map of Higashiyama
- Location of Higashiyama-ku in Japan
- Coordinates: 34°59′50″N 135°46′35″E
- Country: Japan
- Prefecture: Kyoto
- City: Kyoto
- Founded: 1929

Area
  - Total: 7.48 km^{2} (2.89 sq mi)
- Highest elevation: 242 m (794 ft)
- Lowest elevation: 25 m (82 ft)

Population (October 1, 2020)
  - Total: 36,602
  - Density: 4,890/km^{2} (12,700/sq mi)
- Time zone: UTC+9 (Japan Standard Time)
- Website: www.city.kyoto.lg.jp/higasiyama/

Higashiyama (東山区, Higashiyama-ku; meaning "east mountain") is one of the eleven wards in the city of Kyoto, in Kyoto Prefecture, Japan.

== History ==
It was created in 1929 when it was split off from Shimogyō-ku. During the years 1931 to 1976 it also covered the area of present-day Yamashina-ku, which was an independent town until its merger into the city in 1931. The name literally means "Eastern Mountain District".

Due to the restrictions against urban development, the population inside the ward is continually decreasing. Higashiyama-ku has the lowest population of all the wards in Kyoto, and a disproportionate number of elderly people.

== Geography ==
Interposed between the Kamo River and the Higashiyama mountain range, Higashiyama-ku is roughly bounded by the Sanjō street in the north, and the Jūjō street in the south. Historically, this area lay outside the official boundaries of the city of Kyoto. The western part consists mainly of residential areas, whereas the eastern part is covered by forests. In the north, between the Kamo River and Higashi-oji street, there is a commercial district, and in the south there is a semi-industrial zone.

== Demographics ==
Historical population
Year	Pop.	±%
1980	62,077	—
1990	51,171	−17.6%
2000	44,813	−12.4%
2010	40,528	−9.6%
2020	36,602	−9.7%

== Sights ==
Many of the locations central to the development of 15th-century Japanese culture known as Higashiyama Bunka are found here or in Sakyō-ku. Both the entertainment district of Gion in front of Yasaka Shrine, and the area around the stone-paved roads Ninenzaka and Sannenzaka that lead up to the World Heritage Kiyomizu Temple, enjoy protected status to preserve the traditional style buildings. Other temples and shrines in the ward include Tōfuku-ji, Kennin-ji, Kōdai-ji, and Sanjūsangen-dō.

The Kyoto National Museum is also located inside Higashiyama-ku, as well as the Namikawa Cloisonne Museum.

== Education ==
- Kacho College
- Kyoto International Junior and Senior High School (Educational Foundation Kyoto International School)
- Kyoto Kacho University
- Kyoto Women's University

== Gallery ==
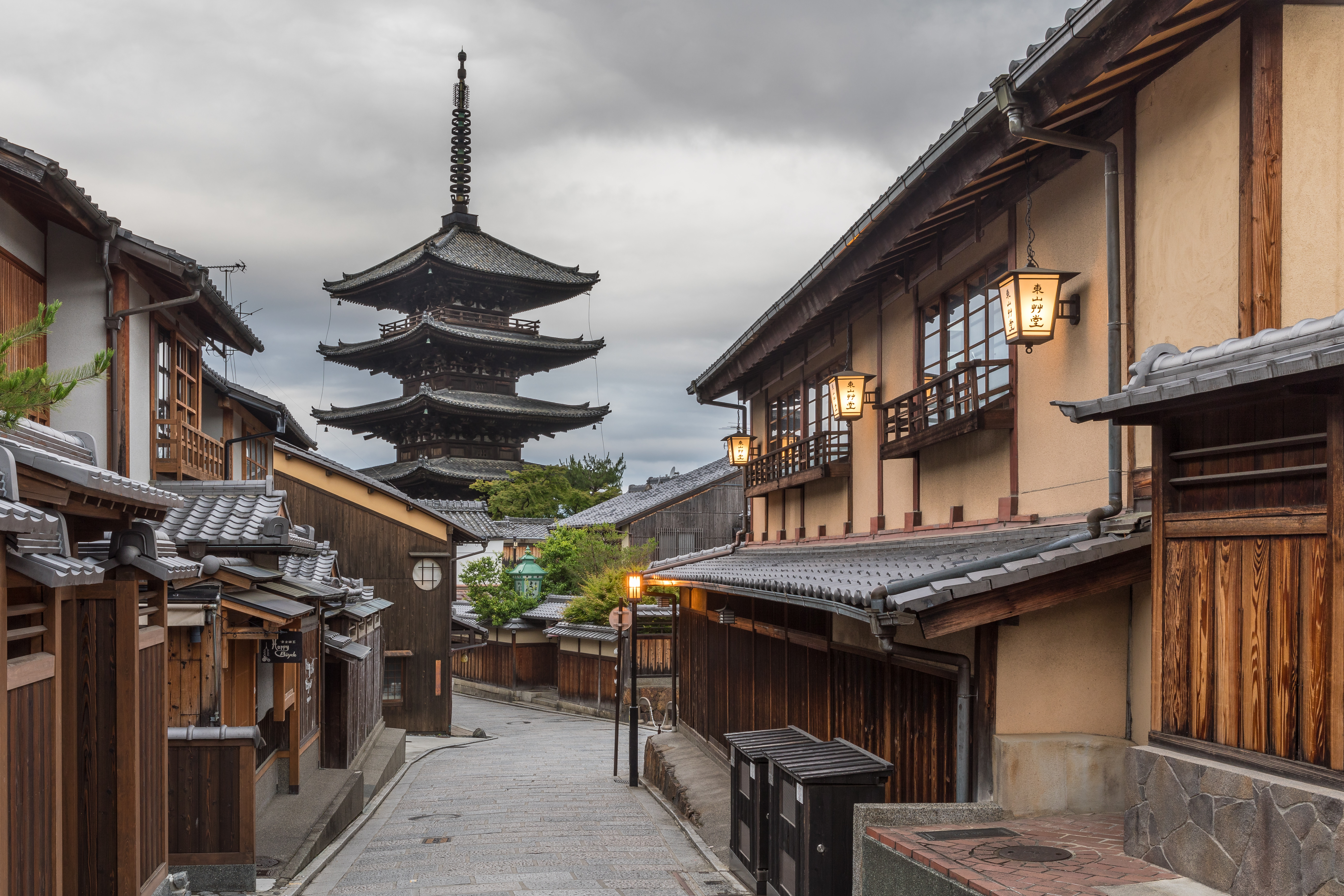
View of the five-story pagoda at Hōgan-ji Temple from Yasakakamimachi

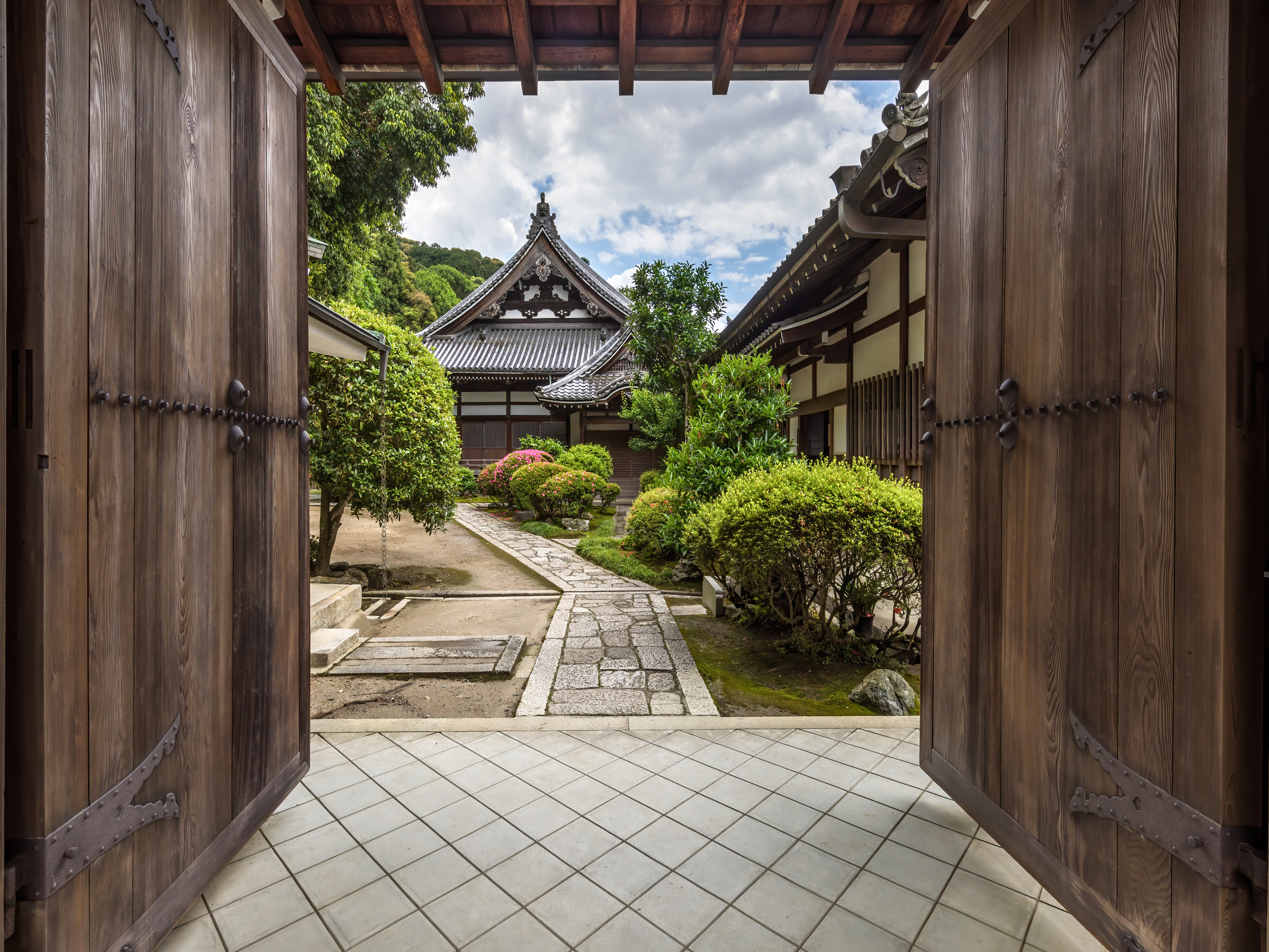
The garden of Isshinin temple in Chion-in, Kyoto

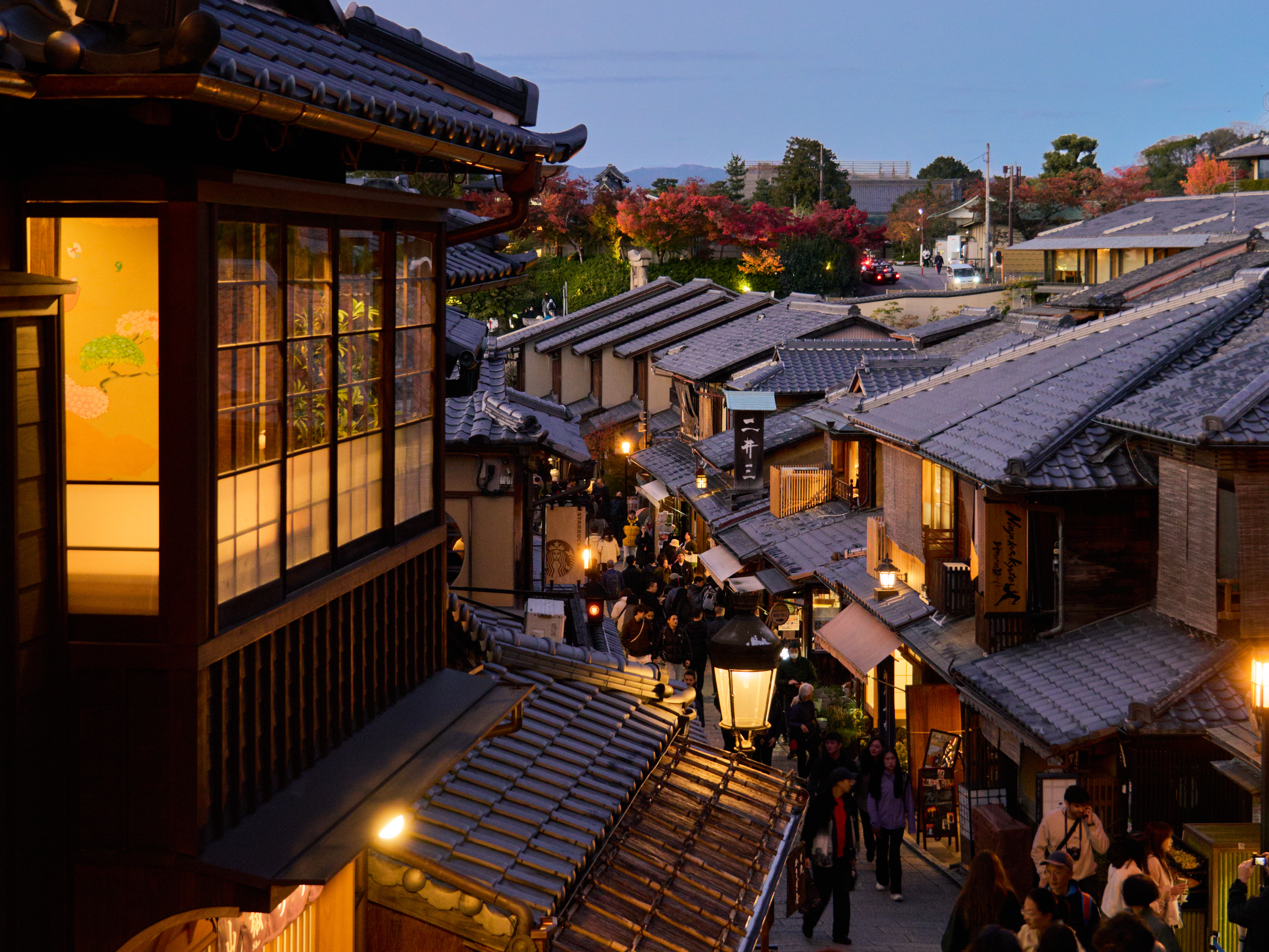
Ninenzaka at dusk

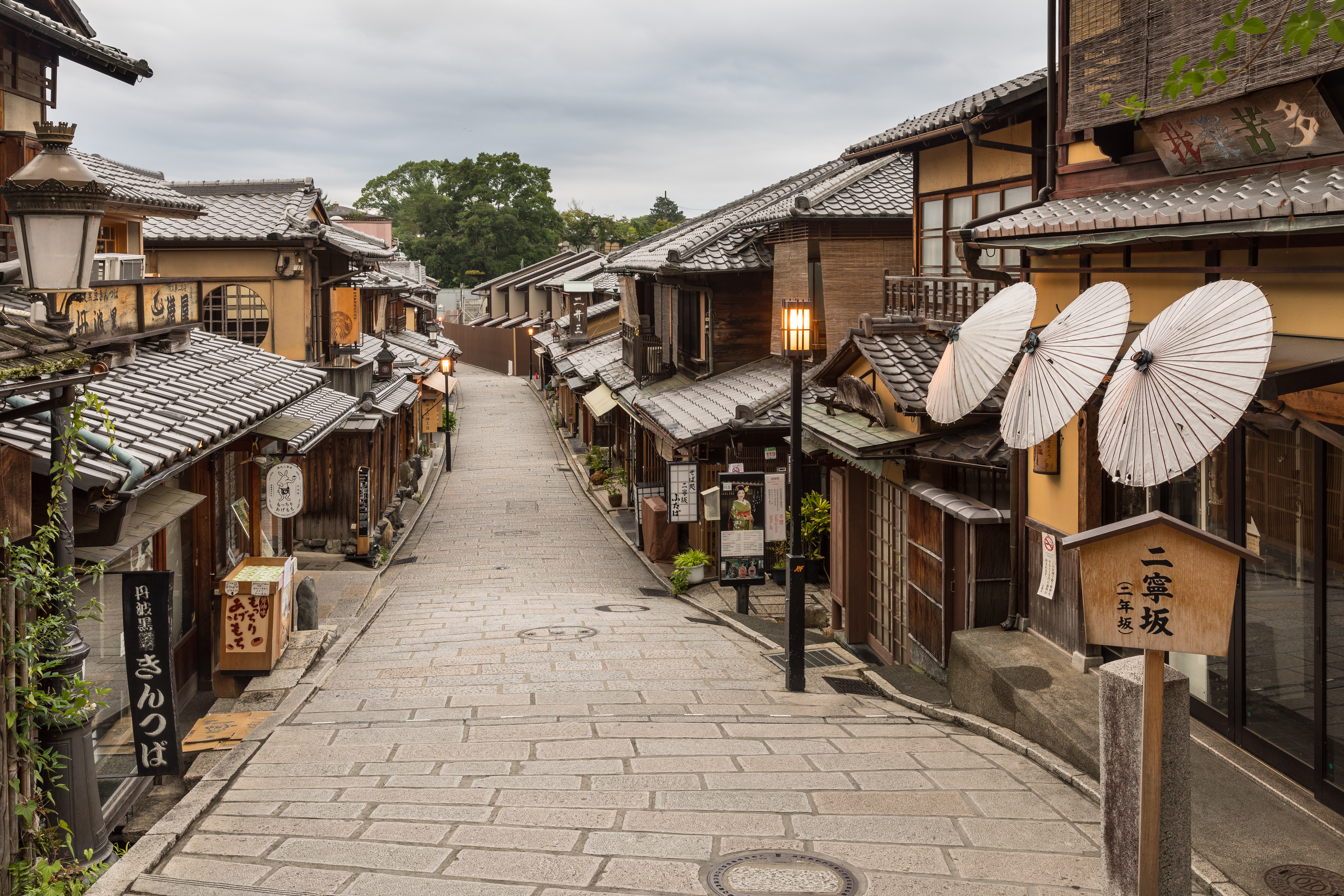
Ninenzaka Street, 3 Chome, Kyoto in the early morning

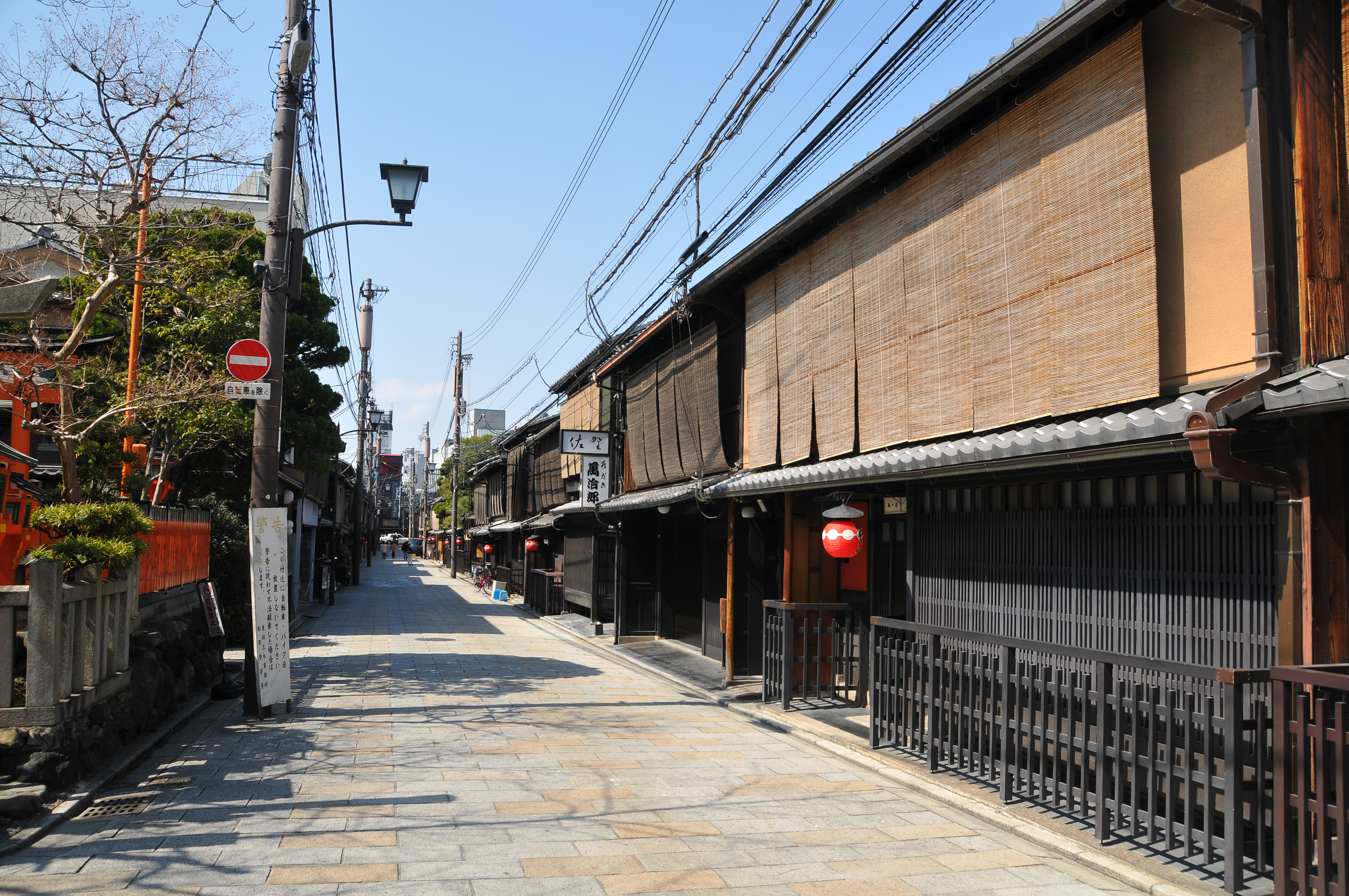
Street in the Gion district, Kyoto

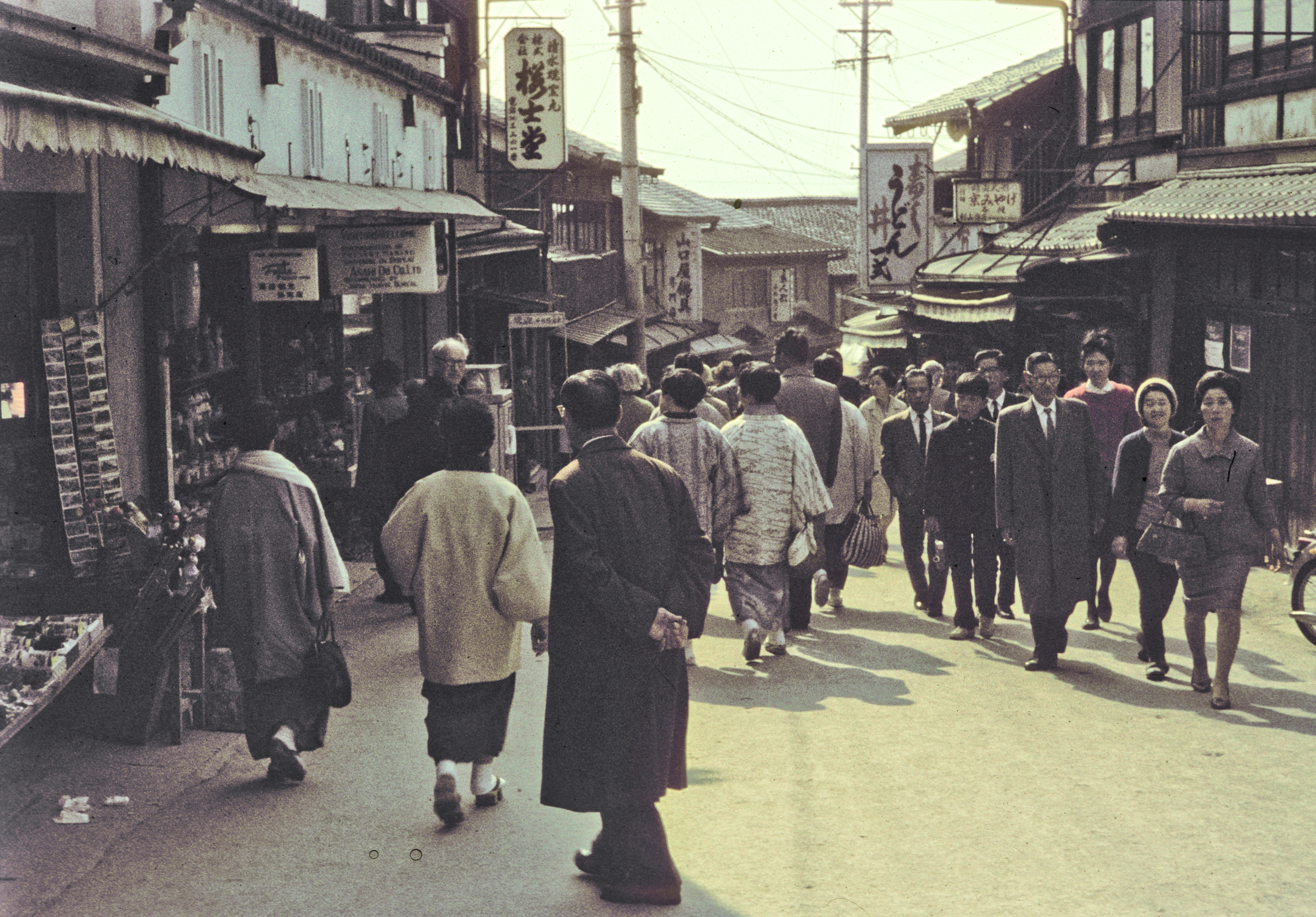
Kiyomizu-zaka slope, Kyoto near Kiyomizu Temple, 1965

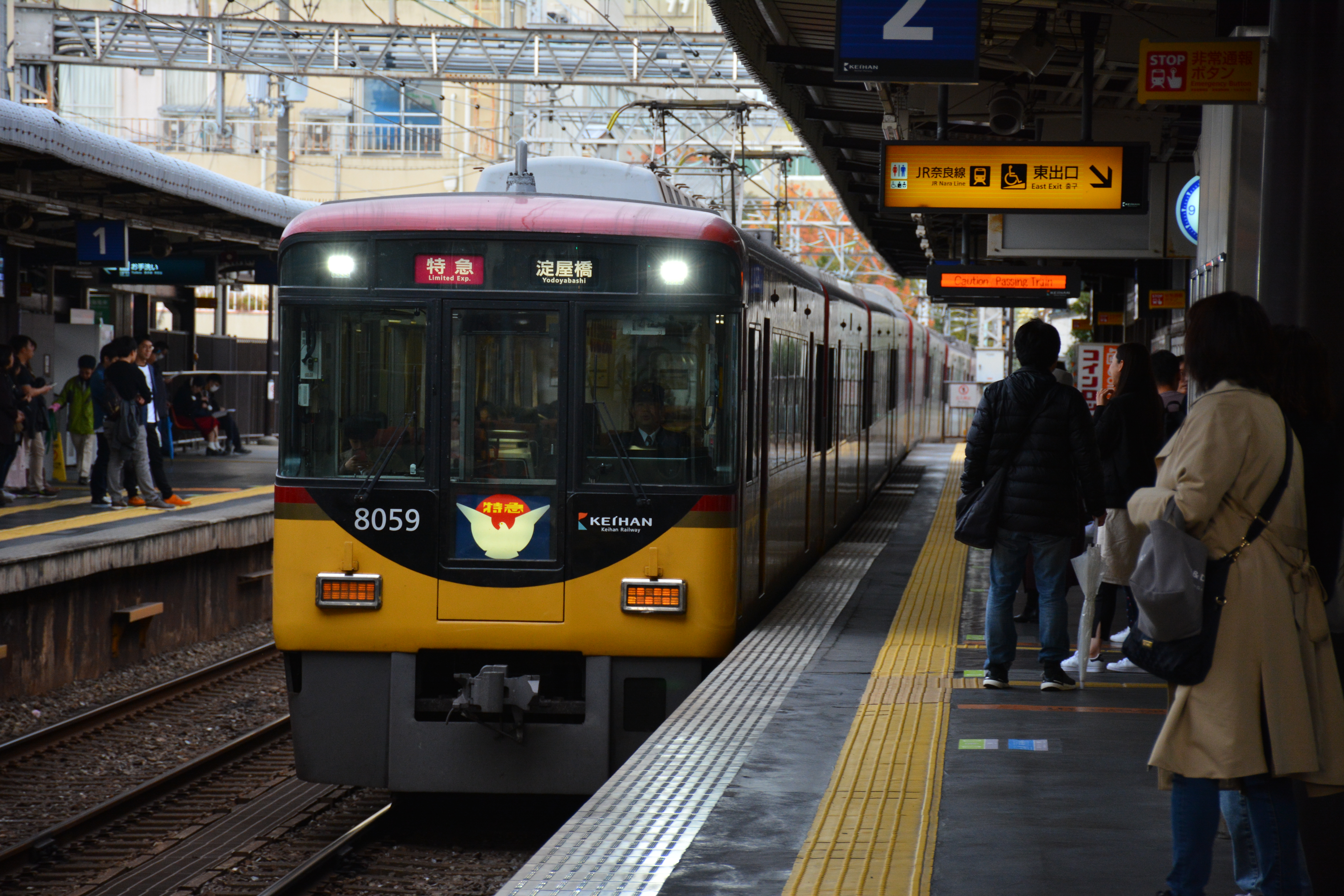
Train at the Tōfukuji station

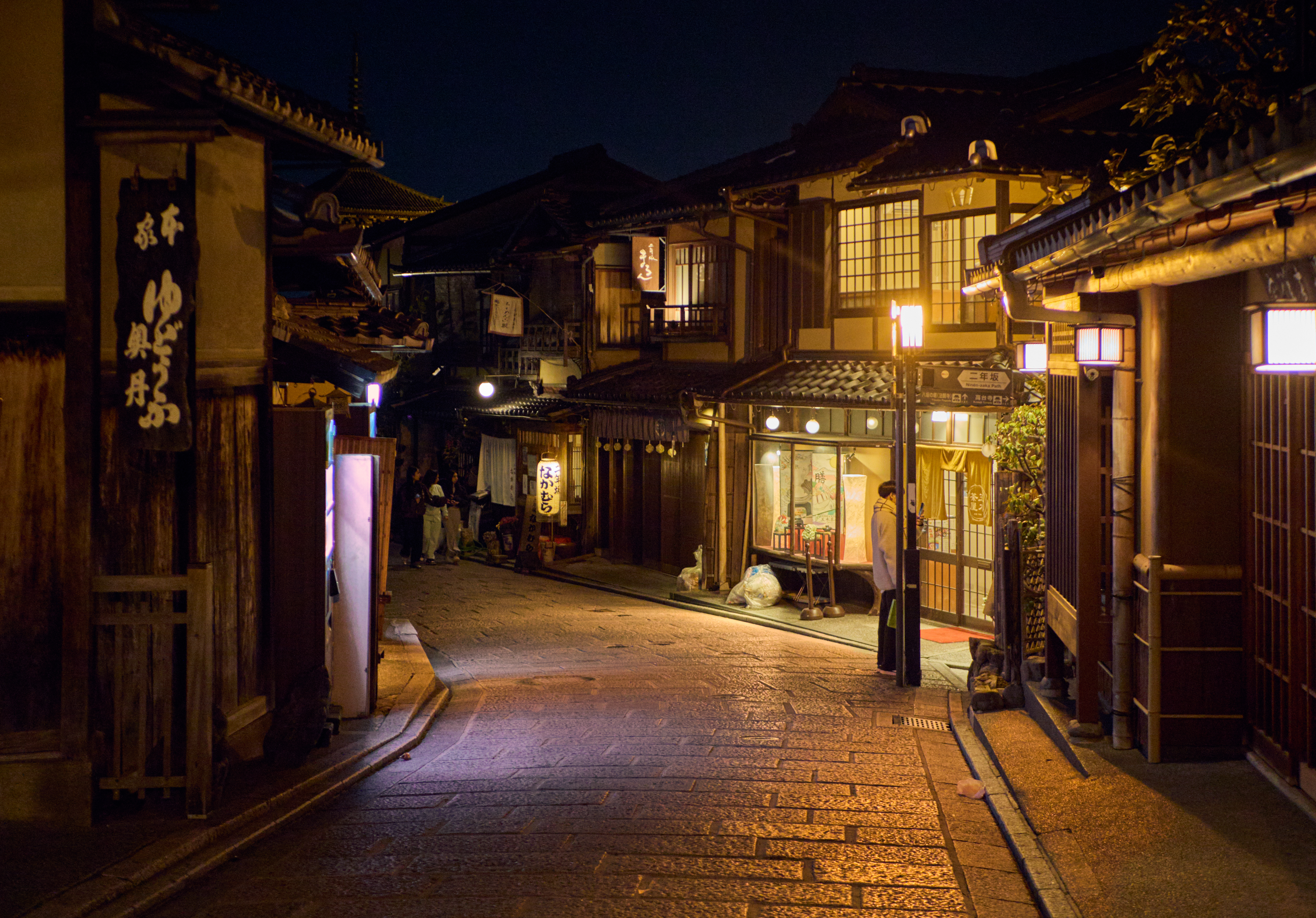
Higashiyama, late night

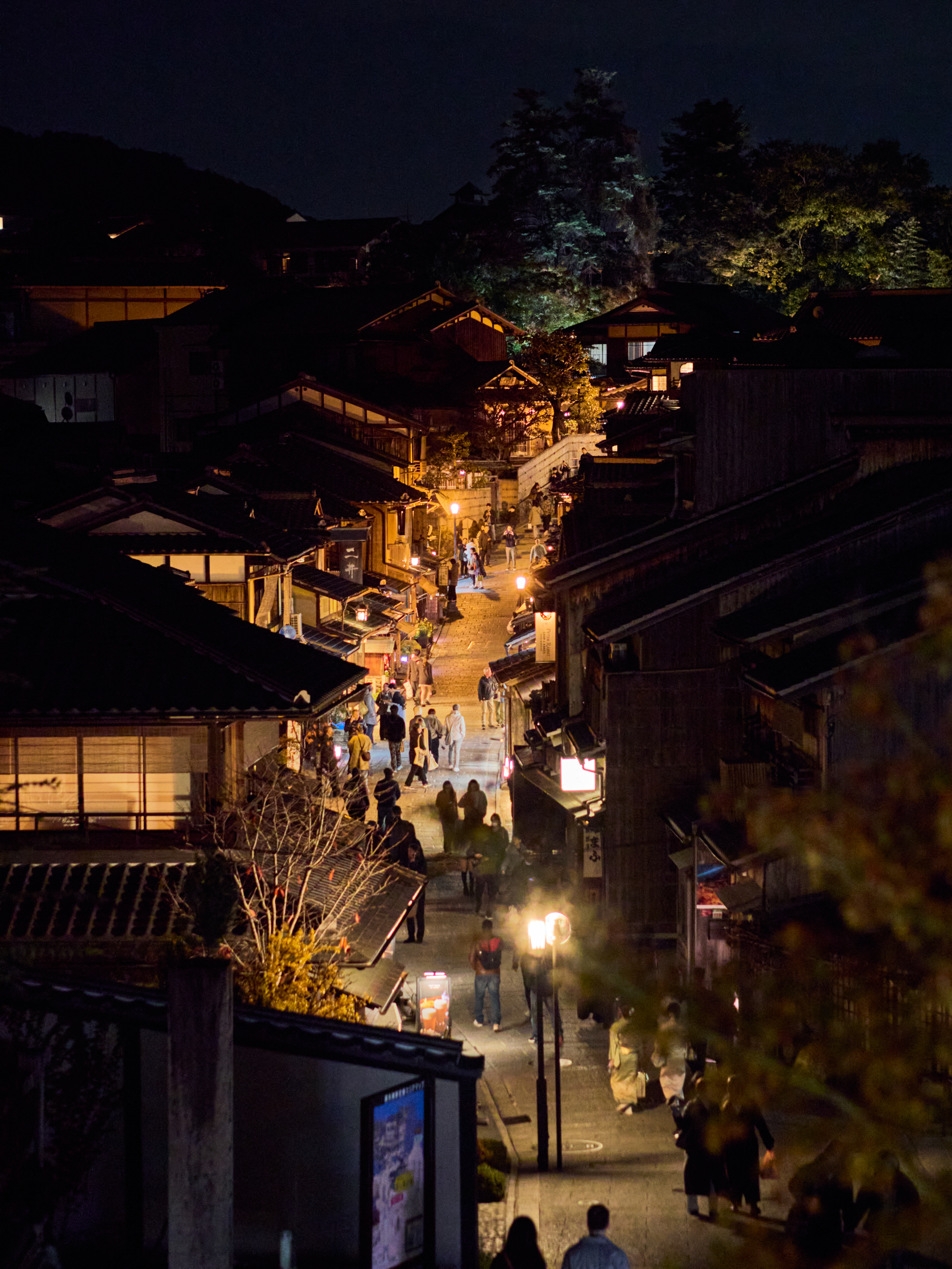
Ninenzaka

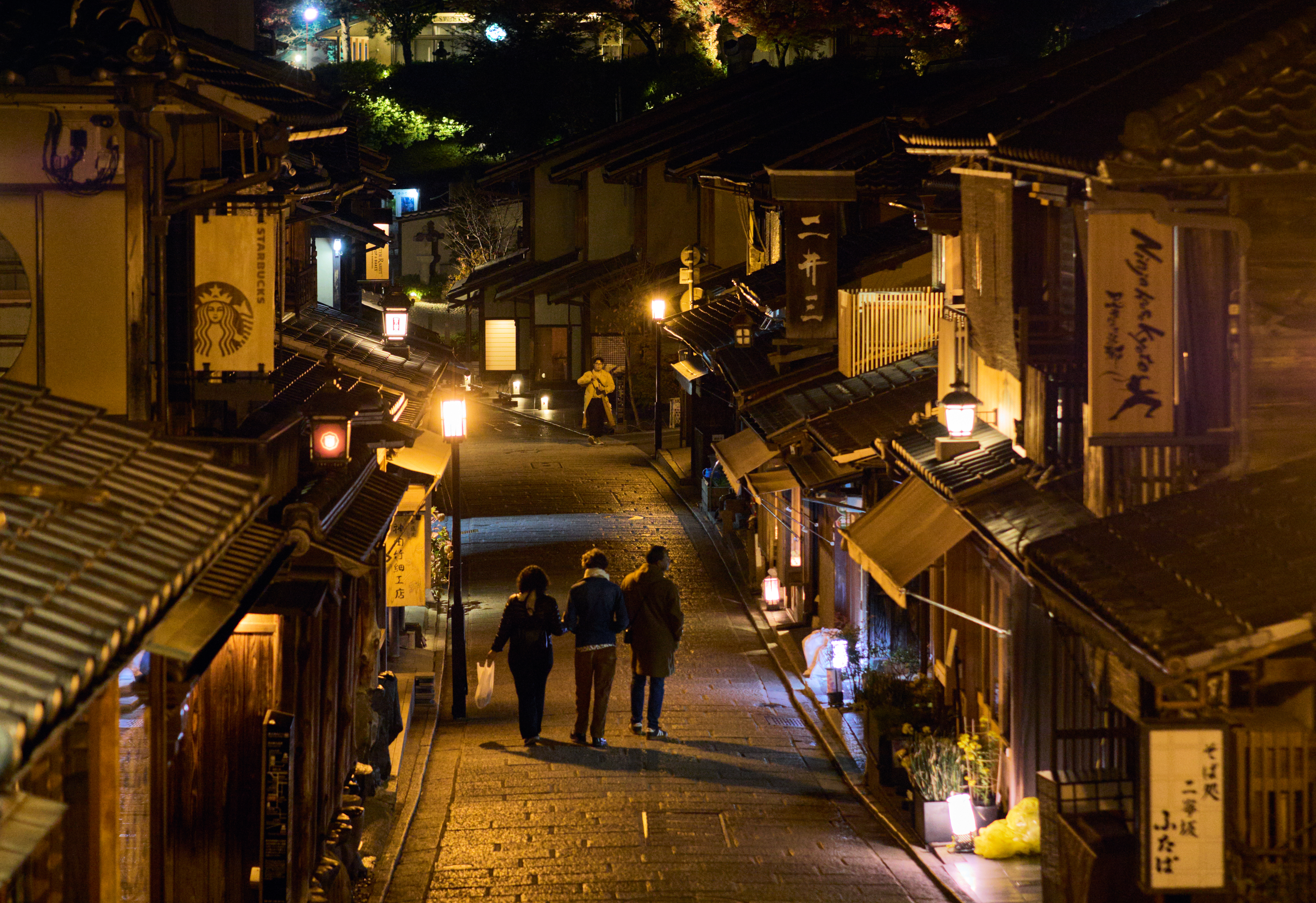
Ninenzaka, late at night
