= Shōfuku-ji (Fukuoka) =

Buddhist temple in Fukuoka Prefecture, Japan

- 聖福寺
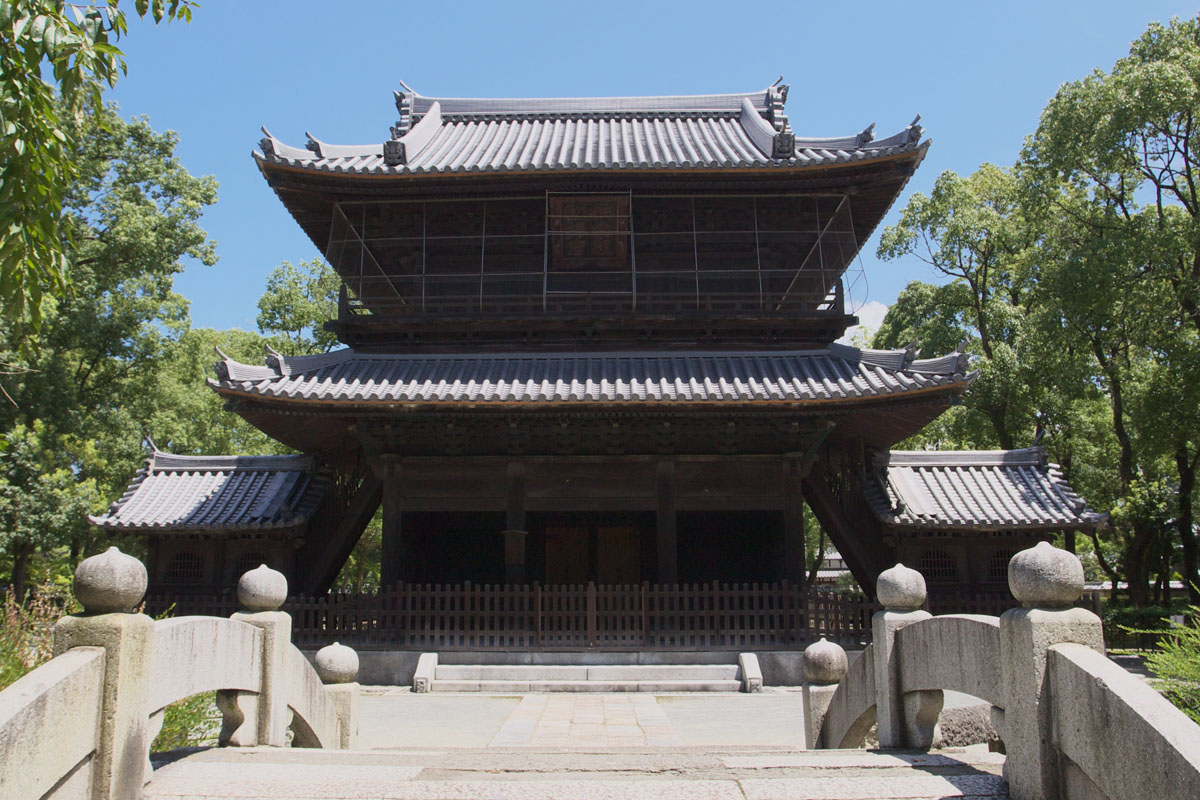
- Rōmon

- Location within Fukuoka Prefecture Location within Japan

Religion
- Affiliation: Buddhist
- Rite: Rinzai school Myōshin-ji-branch
- Status: functional

Location
- Location: 6-1 Gokushocho, Hakata-ku, Fukuoka-shi, Fukuoka-ken
- Country: Japan
- Coordinates: 33°35′49.3″N 130°24′50.8″E

Architecture
- Founder: Eisai
- Completed: 1195

Website
- Official website
- National Historic Site

Shōfuku-ji (聖福寺) is a Buddhist temple located in the Gokushōmachi neighborhood of Hakata, Fukuoka, Japan. It belongs to the Rinzai school Myōshin-ji-branch of Japanese Zen. Its sangō prefix is Ankokuzan (安国山). It was founded by Eisai with support from Minamoto no Yoritomo, and is the oldest Zen temple in Japan. Its precincts were designated a National Historic Site in 1969.

== History ==
According to the "Eisai Genjo"(栄西言上状) handed down at the temple, in 1195, after Eisai, the founder of Japan's Rinzai school, returned from Sung China, he was given eight chō (approximately 900 meters square) by Minamoto no Yoritomo to construct a temple was built on the site of Hyaku-do, a chapel which had been built by Chinese expatriates living in Hakata. The new temple was completed in 1204, and was given a plaque with calligraphy by Emperor Go-Toba for its Sanmon gate. This was Japan's first full-fledged Zen temple and Zen dojo. At its peak, it had 38 sub-temples and chapels in addition to its seven main halls and was the central temple of Hakata. Within the temple grounds, a market town (called "Kannai") was formed, and many place names of modern Hakata still reflect buildings of features of that settlement: Fugendo, Nakakoji, Uomachi, Amaya, Hasuike, and Nishimon. In addition, this was also the location of Chinzei Bugyō, the shogunate's official representative for Kyushu, and served as a point of contact for diplomatic negotiations, producing bilingual monks. In 1563, the temple was destroyed by fire during the wars of the Sengoku period. The temple was revived in 1570, but again in 1574, the temple completely disappeared and fell into disrepair. In 1587, the precincts were considerably reduced due to Toyotomi Hideyoshi's reconstruction of Hakata, but the daimyo Kobayakawa Takakage donated additional land, and under his protection many structures were rebuilt. The temple received addition territory from Toyotomi Hideyoshi in 1595 and Kuroda Nagamasa in 1600.

This temple was originally an independent temple of the Rinzai school, but after its founder Eisai opened Kennin-ji in Kyoto, it became part of the Kennin-ji sect. In the Edo period, by order of Kuroda Nagamasa, it became a temple of the Myōshinji sect, which continues to this day.

The temple is located a three-minute walk from Gion Station on the Fukuoka City Subway Airport Line.

== Gallery ==
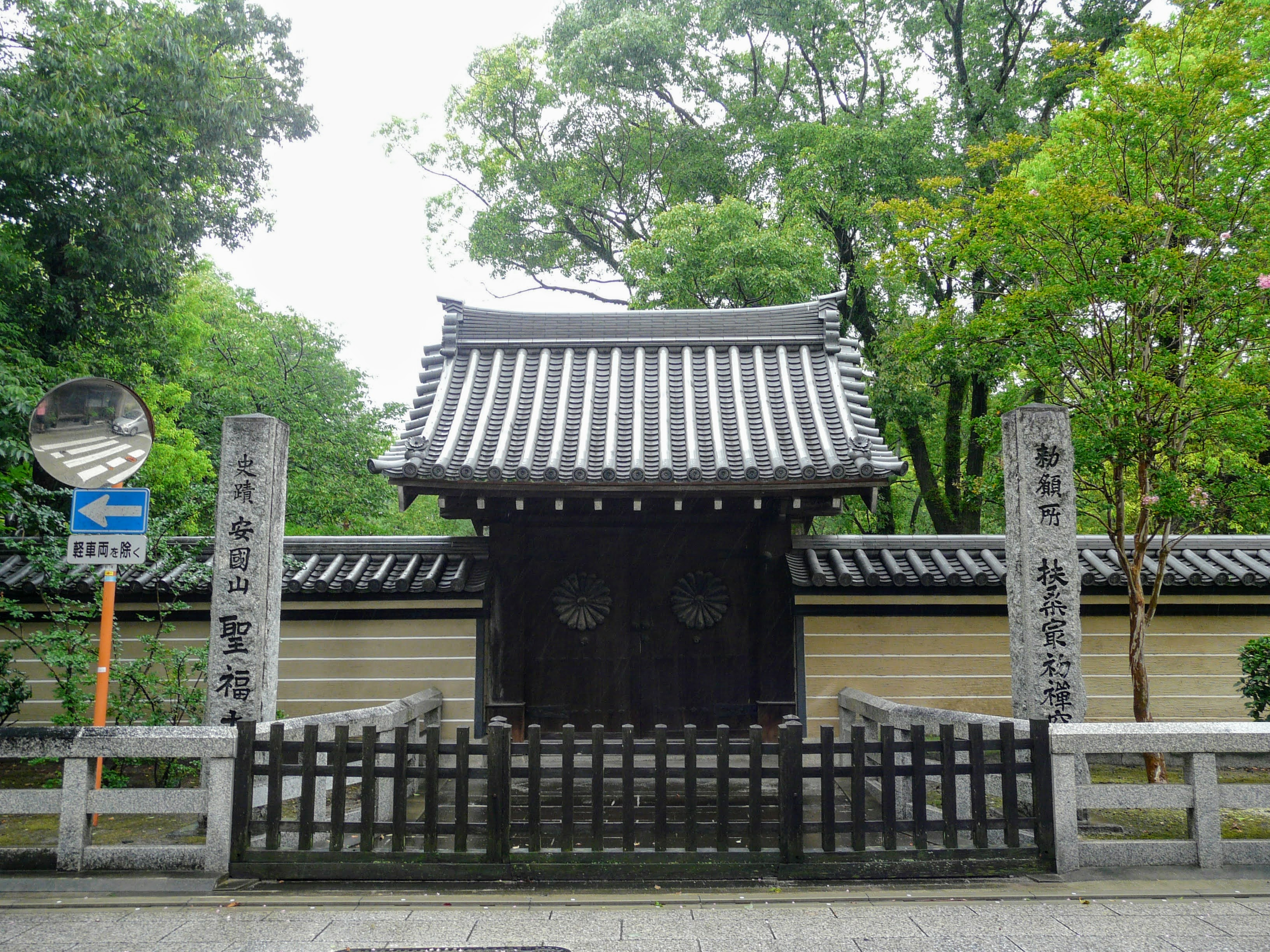
Chokushi-mon

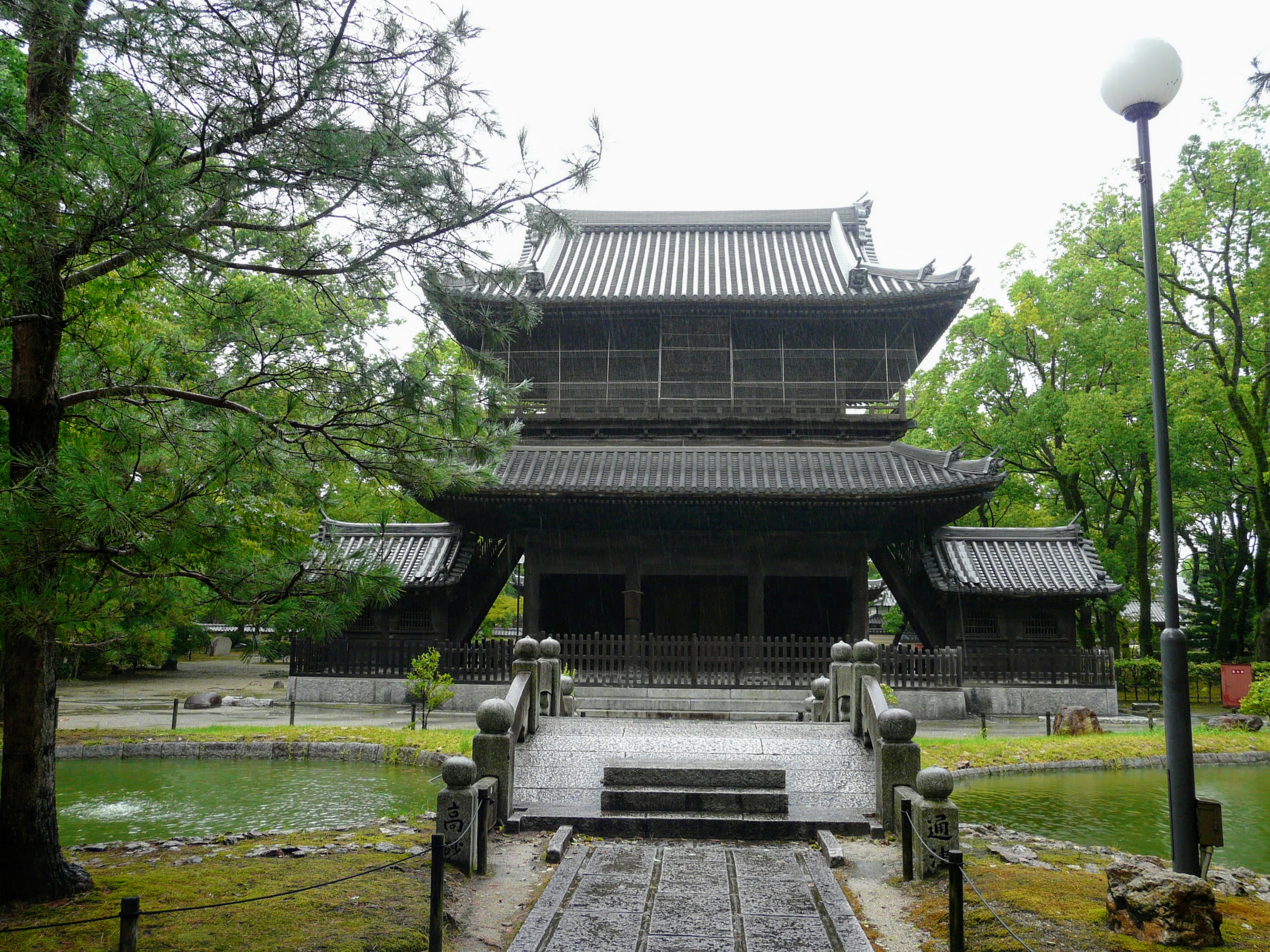
Sanmon and Taiko-bashi

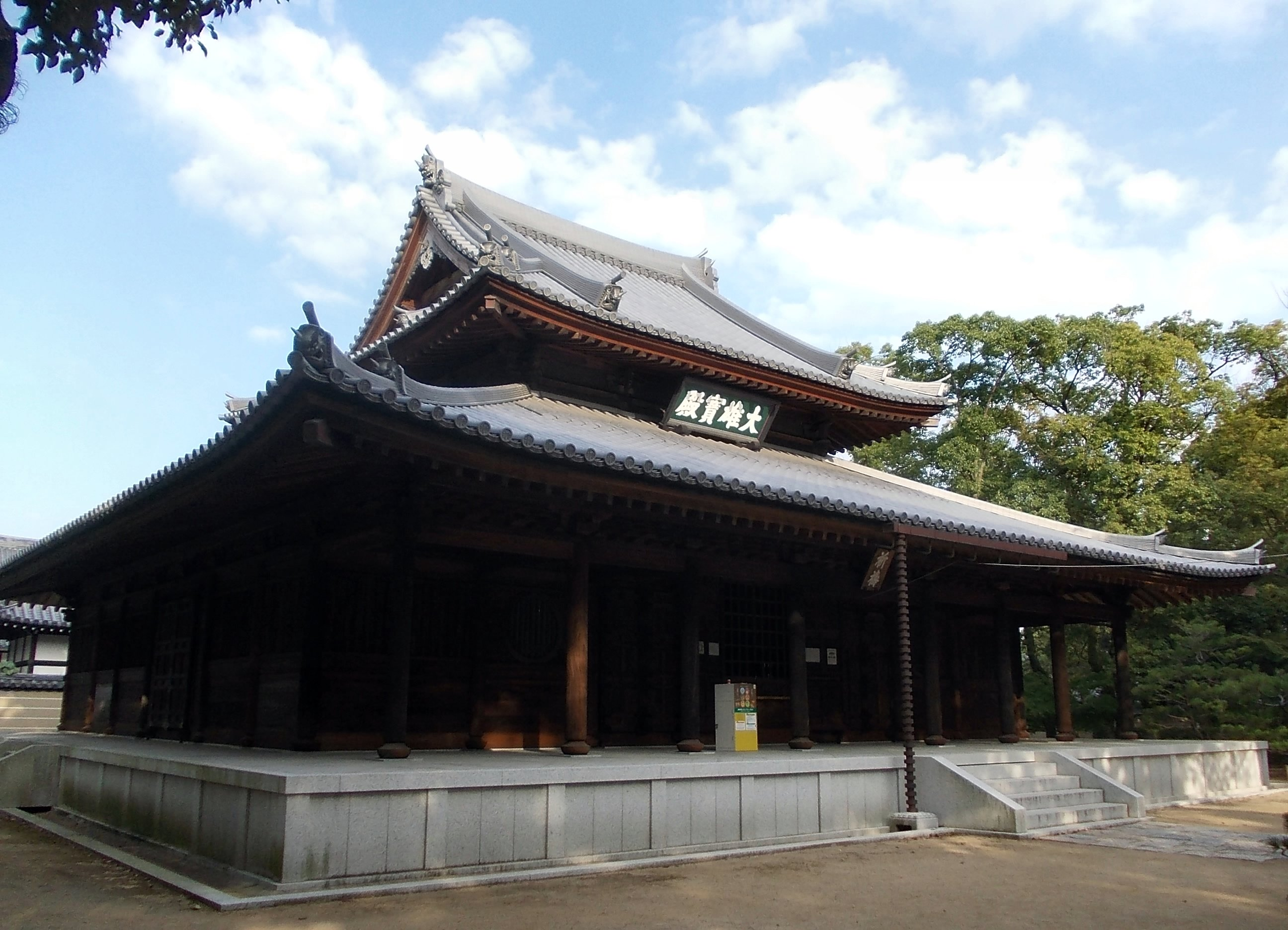
Butsuden

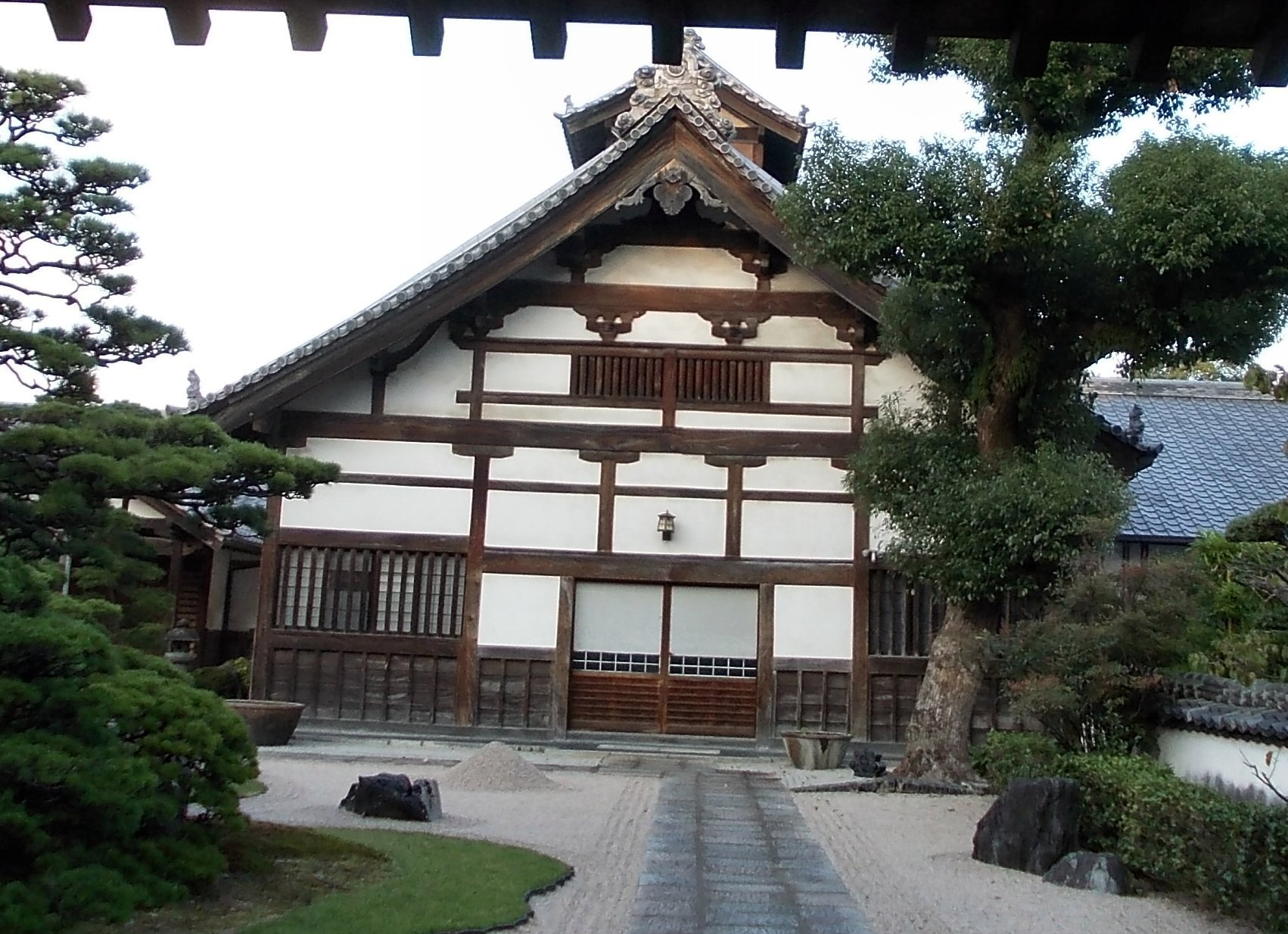
Kuri

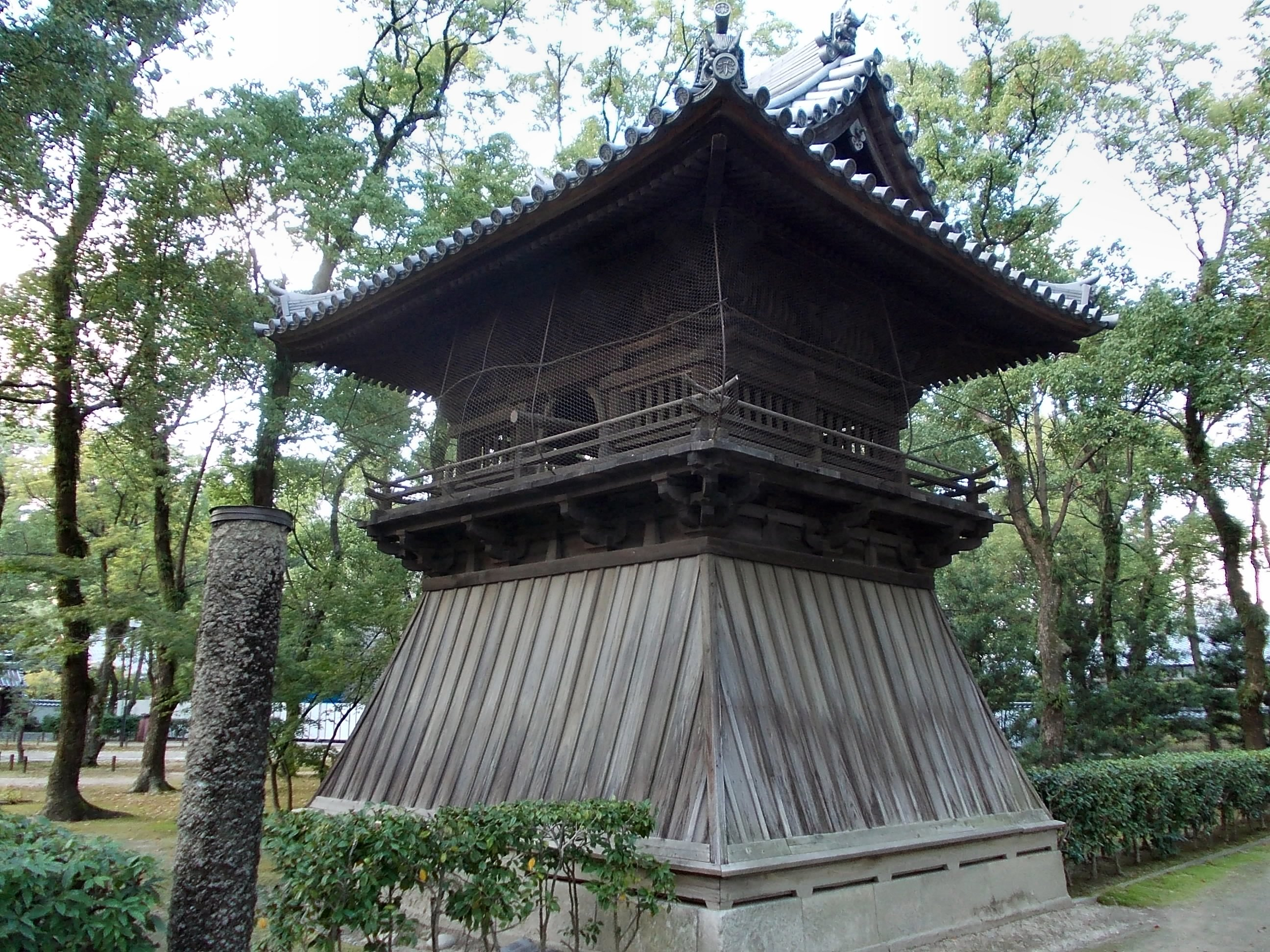
Shōrō

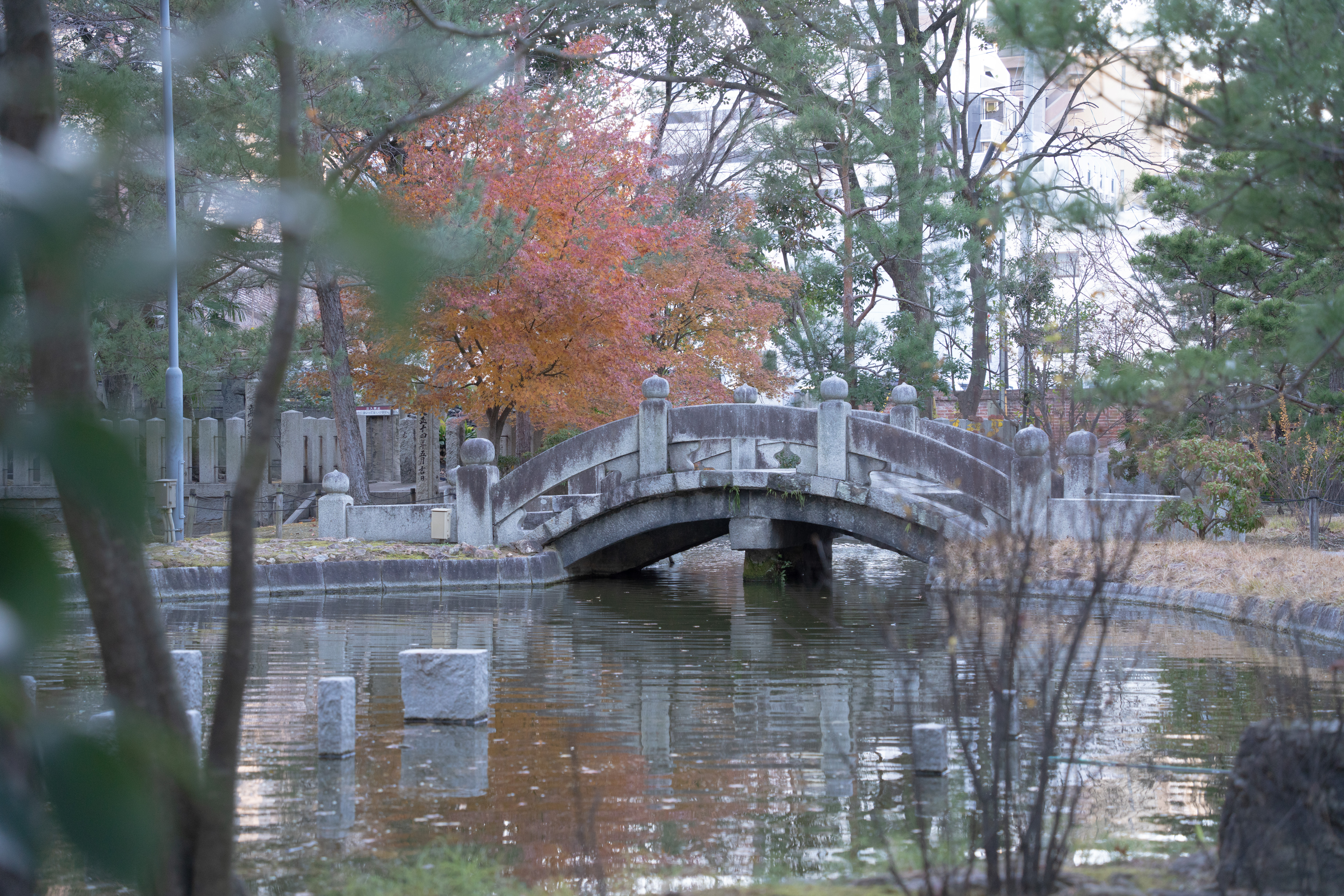
Gardens

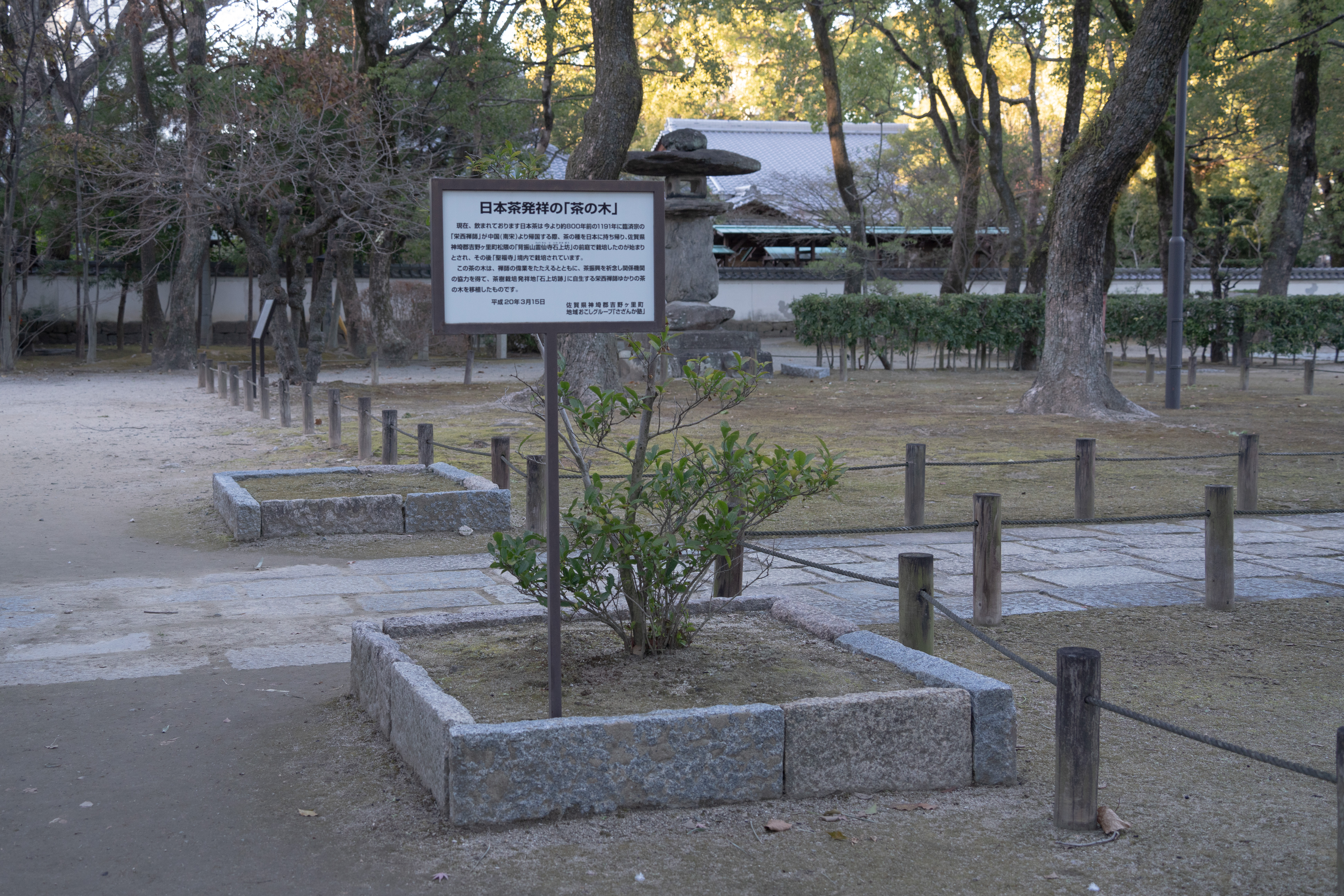
Tree bush

== Structures ==
- Sanmon - According to temple legend, this gate was relocated from Najima Castle
- Chokushimon (Imperial Envoy Gate) - renovated in 1827.
- Kannon-dō - Rebuilt in 1911
- Shōrō Bell Tower - Built in 1589, renovated in 1759. A bronze bell (Korean bell), an important cultural property, hung there until 1976.
- Butsu-den - Rebuilt in 1587, and renovated from 2012-2014
- Hōjō - Relocated from Hizen Nagoya Castle in 1601 by Kuroda Nagamasa; extensively renovated in 1845, 1930 and 1987
- Kuri - Built in 1589, renovated in 1909 and 1968
- Zendō - Relocated from the sub-temple, Keiko-in in 1802.
- Kyōzō - Built in 1682, a tangible folk cultural properties of Fukuoka Prefecture.
- Kaizan-do - Located in the sub-temple Gosho-in
- Cemetery - Contains the graves of the 32nd Prime Minister Kōki Hirota and politician Taketora Ogata
