= Sannenzaka =

Street in Kyoto, Japan

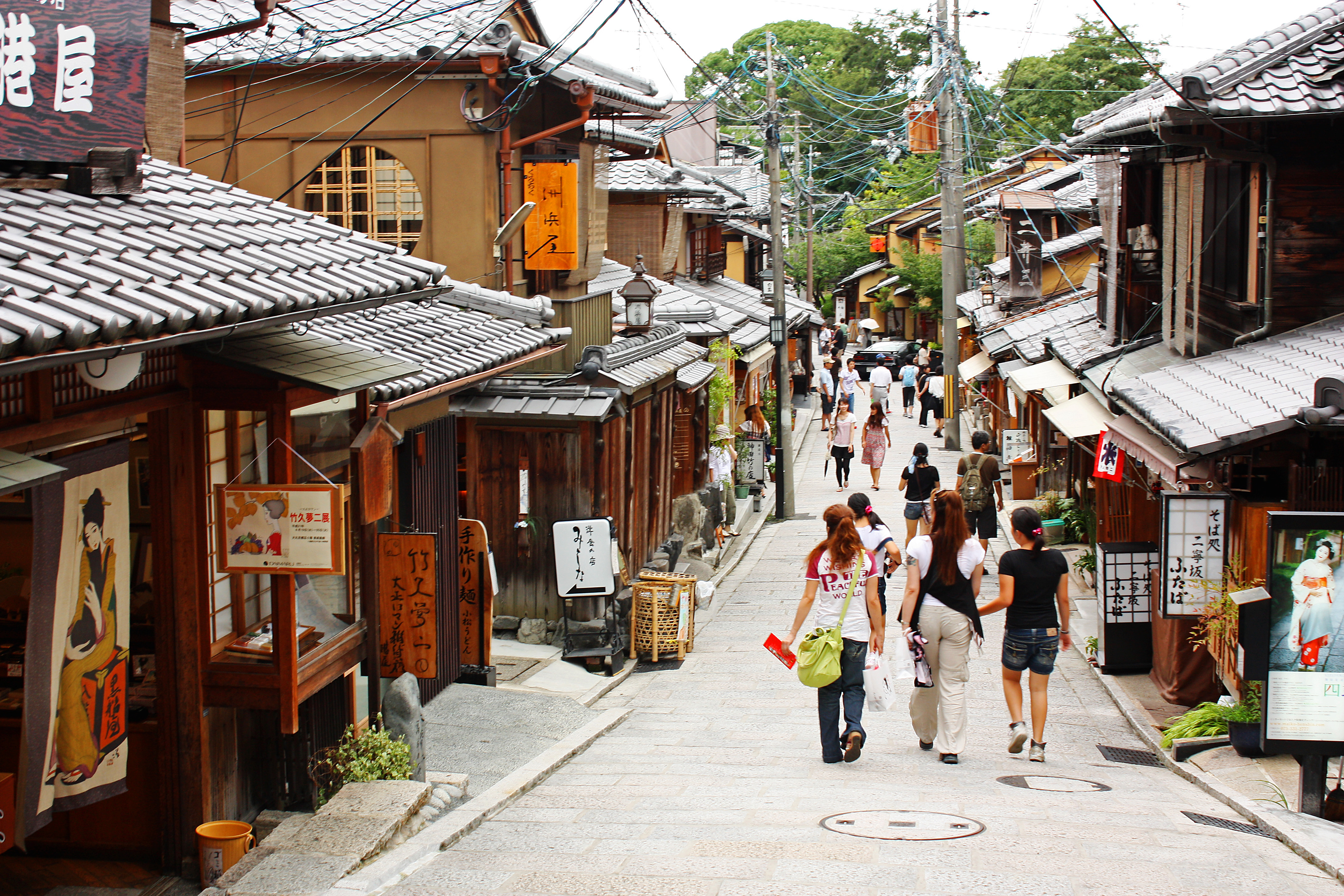
- Interactive map of Sannenzaka
- Type: Pedestrian
- Location: Higashiyama-ku, Kyoto, Japan

Sannenzaka, or Sannen-zaka (三年坂), is a stone-paved pedestrian road and tourist attraction in Higashiyama-ku, Kyoto, Japan. The road is lined with traditional buildings and shops, and is often paired with the similar road, Ninenzaka. The two roads lead to Kiyomizu-dera Temple, Kodaiji Temple and Yasaka-jinjia Shrine, which are a few famous sights in Kyoto. Sannenzaka itself is a narrow slope that is filled with around 60 shops and restaurants that sell traditional products and food from Kyoto. There are also notable shops for visitors to get a hands-on experience of Japanese culture, including tea ceremonies, as well as Maiko and Geisha makeovers.

== Name origin ==
The real name of Sannenzaka is Sanneizaka which translates to "safe delivery hill". According to old Japanese myths, while Empress Komyo was pregnant, she dreamt of a monk who guaranteed her to safely deliver her baby as long as she had faith in Kannon. After that experience, she found a gold statue on her pillow which she enshrined as a Buddha of safe delivery in the Kyomizu Temple alongside her own picture. Many women would go to the temple to pray for a successful childbirth including Hideyoshi Toyotomi's wife.

== Traditional architecture ==
In 1972, this area was the first to be nominated as a historic preservation district in Kyoto, which then became the first legal preservation of urban regions in Japan. The street of Sannenzaka contained many traditional buildings called Kyo Machiya that were meant to endure the changing weather conditions of Kyoto. The doors are made out of wood, sliding doors are made out of paper, and walls out of mud. Businesses would operate in the front, while living spaces were in the rest of the house, which are both accessible through separate entrances. Modifications of Kyo Machiya can also be seen in this area, including two storied Machiya from the Meiji era and the Sukiya-style Machiya. From 1999 to 2014, the original purpose for Machiya started to fade as many buildings were turned into souvenir shops.

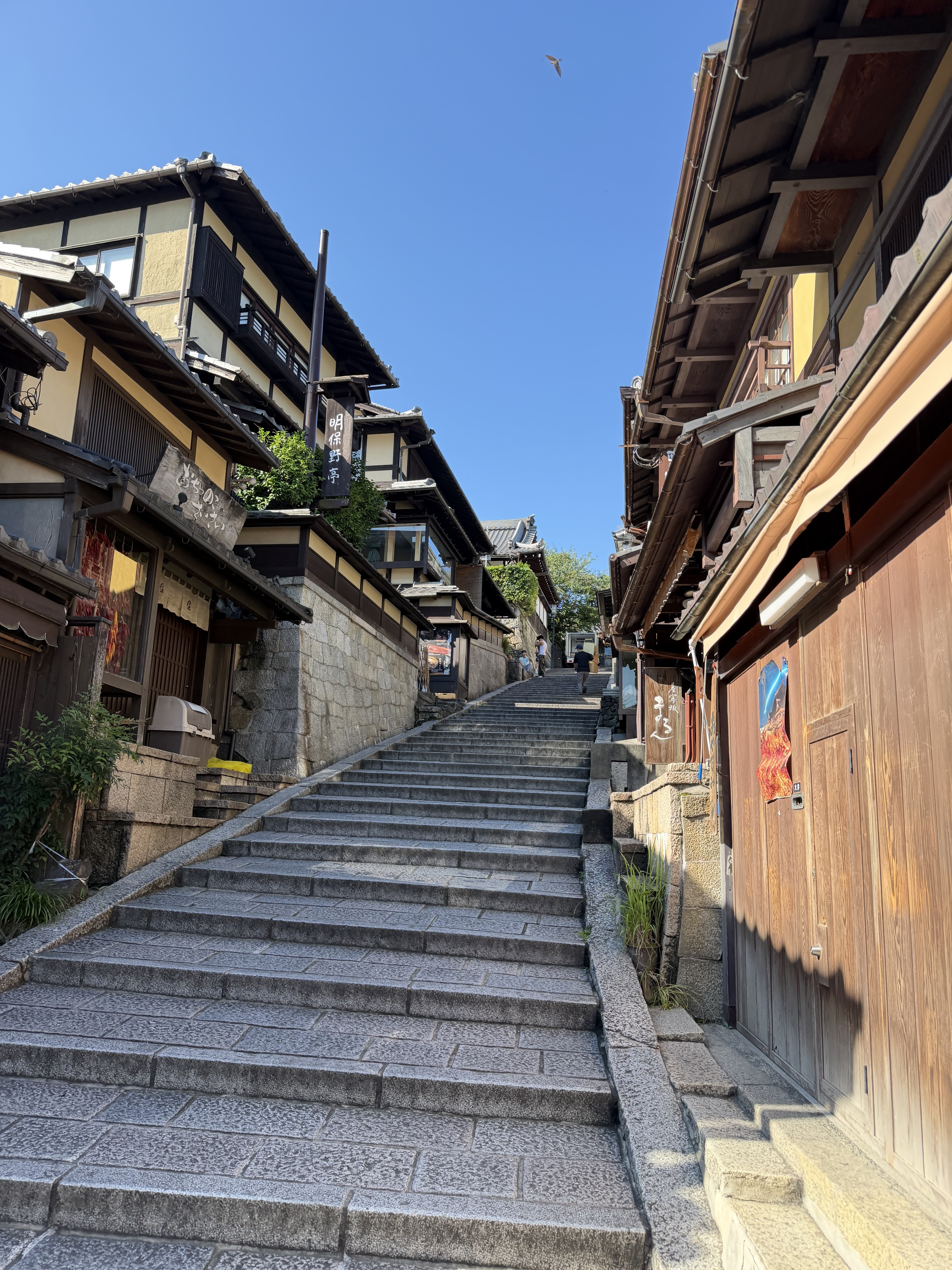
Sannenzaka facing uphill in July 2026
