= Ninenzaka =

Street in Kyoto, Japan

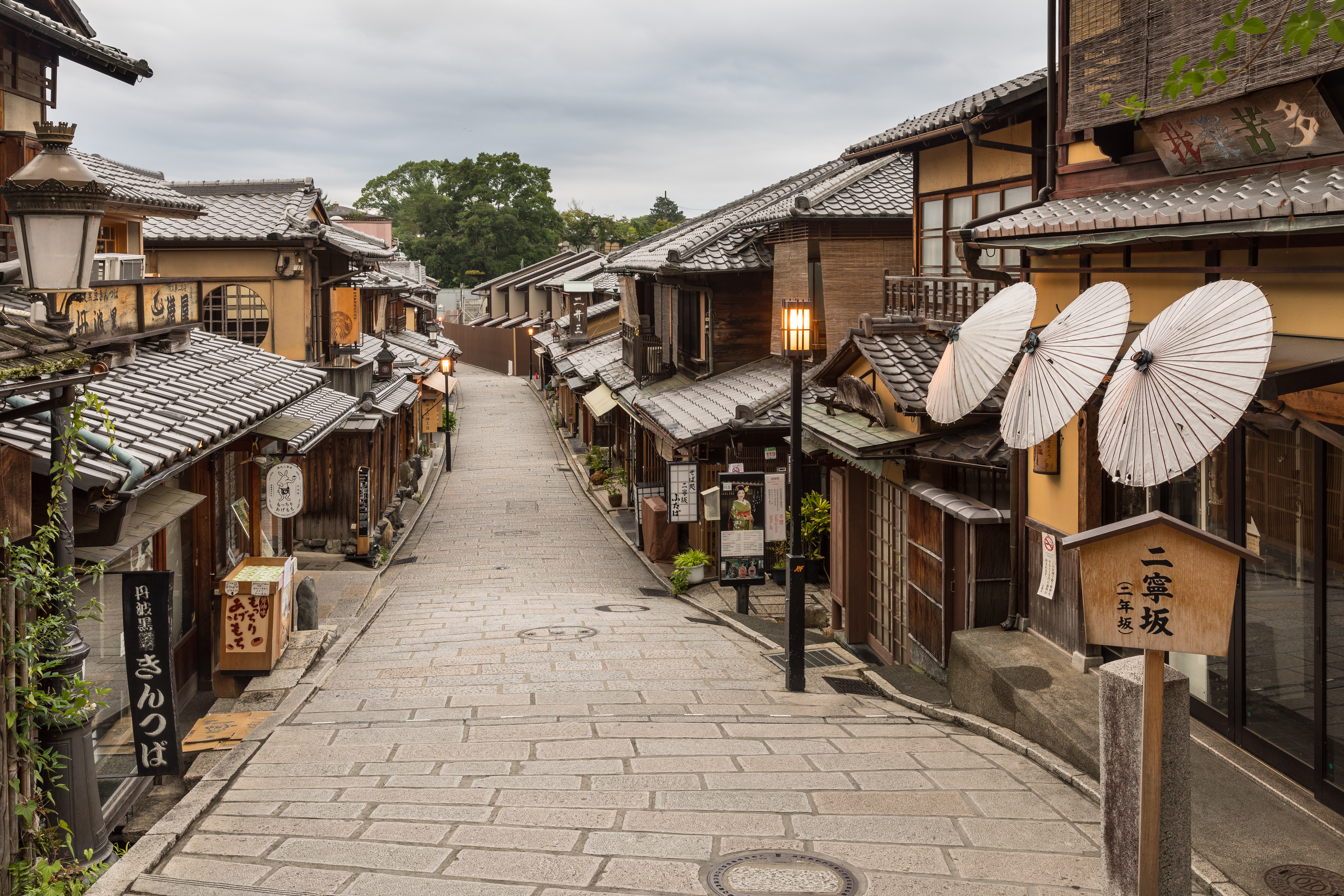

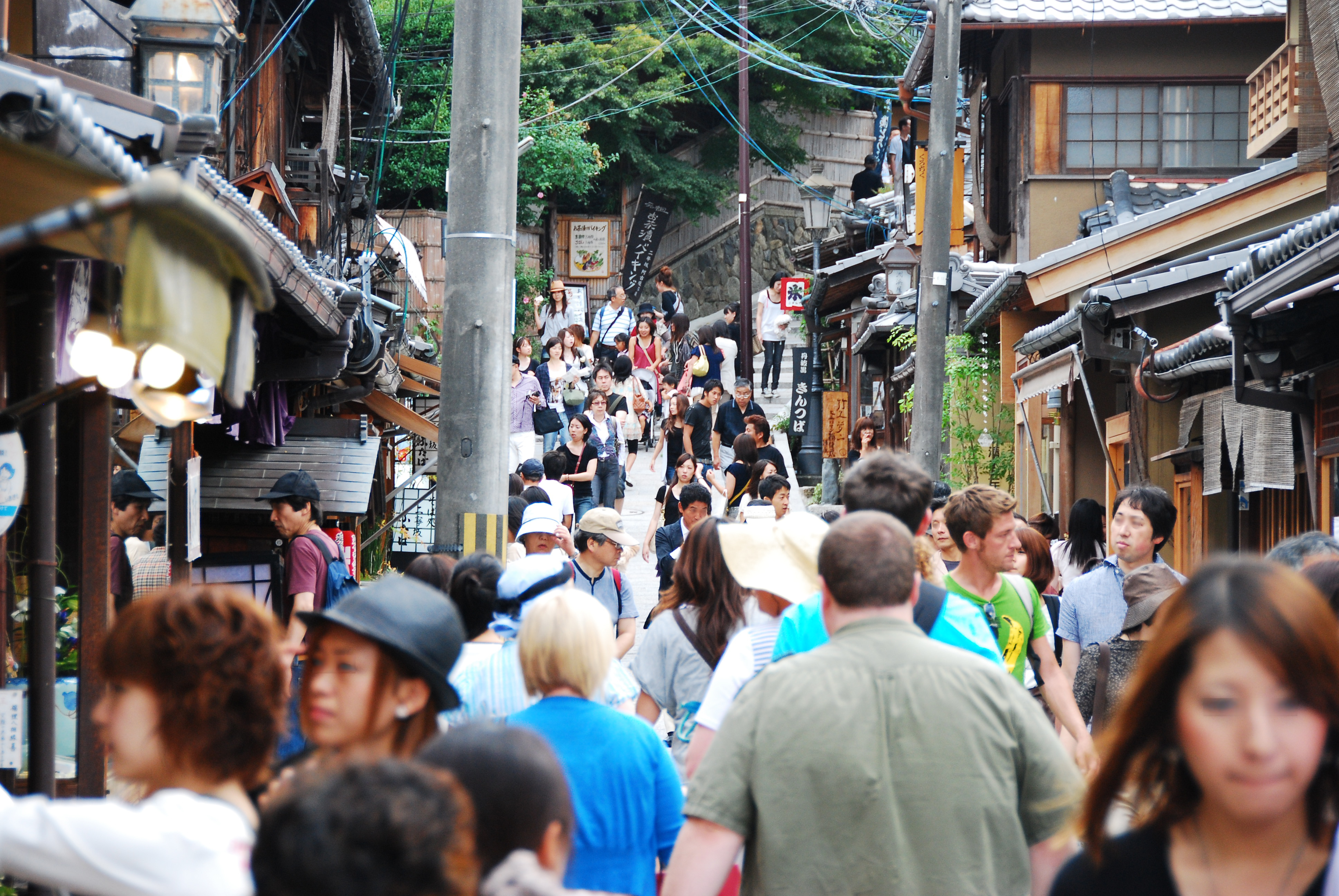
The slope in 2009

Ninenzaka, or Ninen-zaka (二年坂) is an ancient 150m stone-paved pedestrian road and tourist attraction in Higashiyama-ku, Kyoto, Japan. The road is lined with traditional buildings and shops, and is often paired with the similar road, Sannenzaka.
