= Eisai =

Japanese buddhist monk (1141–1215)

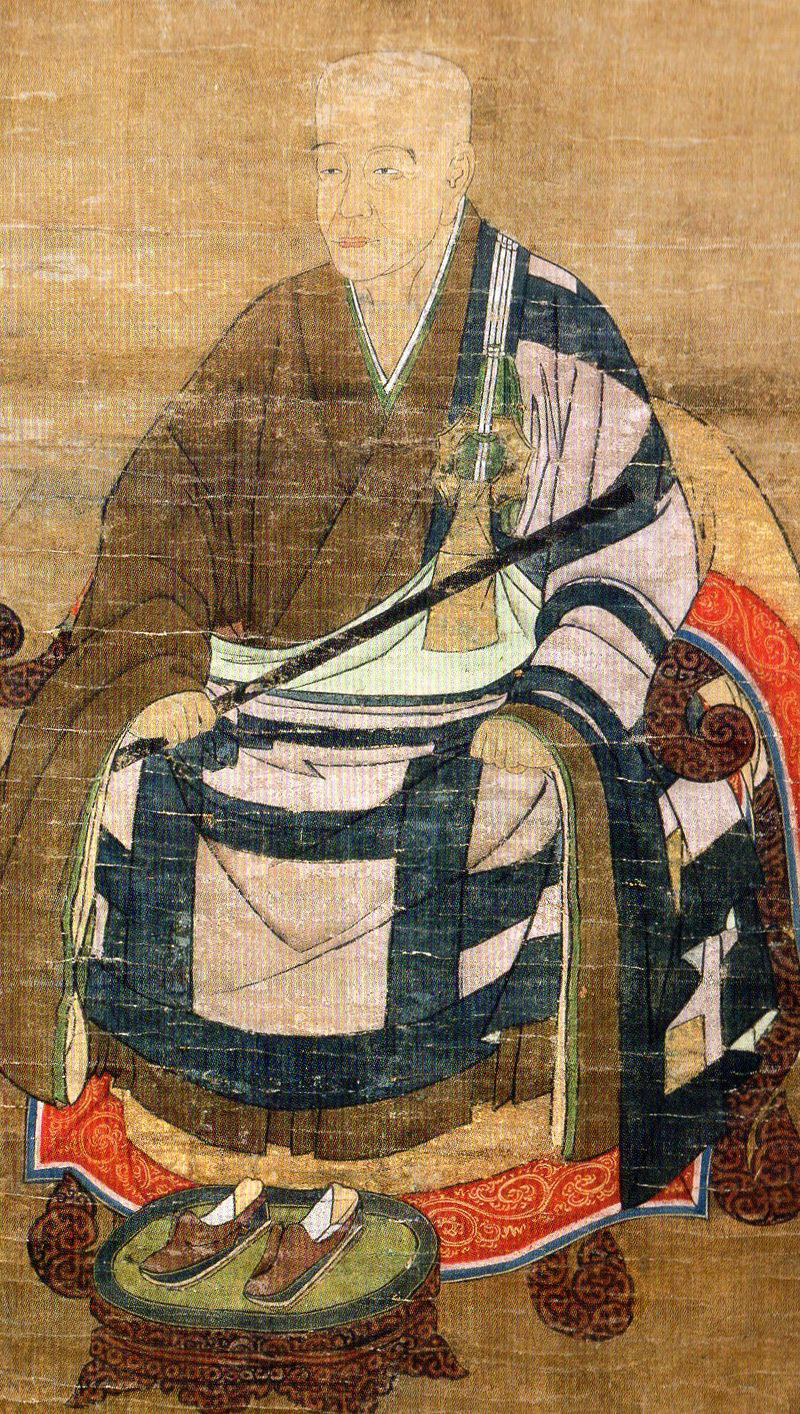
- Title: Zen Master

Personal life
- Born: 27 May 1141 Bitchū Province, Japan
- Died: 1 August 1215 (aged 74) Heian-kyō, Japan

Religious life
- Religion: Buddhism
- School: Rinzai

Myōan Eisai or Yōsai (明菴 栄西; Japanese pronunciation: [eꜜi.sai, eꜜː-, joꜜː-], 27 May 1141 – 1 August 1215) was a Japanese Buddhist priest, credited with founding the Rinzai school, the Japanese line of the Linji school of Zen Buddhism. In 1191, he introduced this Zen approach to Japan, following his trip to China from 1187 to 1191, during which he was initiated into the Linji school by the master Hsü an. It is also said that he popularized green tea in Japan, following this same trip. He was also the founding abbot of Shōfuku-ji and Kennin-ji, two of the earliest Zen temples in Japan. He is often known simply as Eisai/Yōsai Zenji (栄西禅師), literally "Zen master Eisai".

== Biography ==
Born in Bitchū Province (modern-day Okayama, Okayama), Eisai was ordained as a monk in the Tendai sect. Dissatisfied with the state of Buddhism at the time, in 1168 he set off on his first trip to Mount Tiantai in China, the origin of the sect, where he learned of the primacy of the Chan (later known in Japan as Zen) school in Chinese Buddhism of the time. He spent only six months in China on this first trip, but returned in 1187 for a longer stay as a disciple of Xuan Huaichang, a master in the Linji (Rinzai) line, at Jingde Si (Ching-te-ssu, 景德寺) monastery.

After his certification as a Zen teacher, Eisai returned to Japan in 1191, bringing with him Zen scriptures and green tea seeds. He immediately founded the Shōfuku-ji in Kyūshū, Japan's first Zen temple. The prayer rituals and recitation of sutras that Eisai integrated into his monastic routines can be traced back to the Rules of Purity established during the Chinese Song dynasty.

Eisai set about slowly propagating the new faith, trying to gain the respect of both the Tendai school and the Imperial court through careful diplomacy. Faced with the sometimes violent opposition of traditional schools of Buddhism such as Tendai, Shingon and Pure Land, Eisai finally left Kyoto for the north-east to Kamakura in 1199, where the shōgun and the newly ascendant warrior class enthusiastically welcomed his teachings. Hōjō Masako, Yoritomo's widow, allowed him to build Jufuku-ji, the first Zen temple in Kamakura. Eisai founded Kennin-ji in Kyoto in 1202 on land gifted to him by Yoritomo's son, the second Kamakura shōgun Minamoto no Yoriie. Eisai died in 1215 at the age of 74, and is buried in Kennin-ji's temple grounds.

One feature of Eisai's activity not often noted is his continued eclecticism. He never renounced his status as a Tendai monk, and until the end of his life continued to engage in Tendai esoteric practices. Though he is credited with transmission of the Rinzai line to Japan, it remained for later teachers to establish a distinctly Japanese Zen free of admixture with the teachings of other schools. Among his notable disciples was Eihei Dōgen, who himself traveled to China and returned to found the Sōtō school of Zen in Japan.

== Importing green tea ==
Eisai is also credited with the beginning of the tea tradition in Japan, by bringing green tea seeds from China, back from his second trip in 1191, and writing the book 喫茶養生記, Kissa Yōjōki (in English, Drinking Tea for Health). Legend says that he planted the seeds "in the garden of the Ishigamibo at Seburiyama in Hizen".

In addition to his book, Eisai also garnered attention from another act involving his tea; using it as treatment for shōgun Sanetomo. This is a record of his treatment from the Azuma Kagami:

The shōgun was taken a bit ill, and various attendants attempted to treat him. This was not so serious but was from overindulgence in wine the previous evening. The priest Yojo, who had come to perform incantations and learned the situation, brought a bowl of tea from his temple, saying it was good medicine. He also asked the attendants to give the shōgun a scroll of writings about the virtues of tea, and the shōgun was said to have been greatly pleased. Priest Yojo indicated he had written it recently during his breaks from meditation.

Eisai was more focused on the medicinal aspects than anything else, and the main reason for this was the common conception of the time that the world was in mappō, the Latter age of the Dharma, which was considered by many to be a time of decline. Eisai lived through an era of heavy fighting in Japan, so mappō played a big role in his promotion of tea, as he thought it was a cure for many ailments and hence would help people get through this perceived difficult time.

In Kissa Yōjōki, the beginning bulk of text after the prefaces concern the alignment of the five elements of Chinese science (earth, fire, water, wood, and metal) with five major organs (the liver, lungs, heart, spleen, and kidneys) and the respective five flavors that each major organ preferred (acidic, pungent, bitter, sweet, and salty). Eisai claimed that the standard Japanese fare of the time contained abundant amounts of each, except for the bitter flavor, which was the cause of the many heart diseases the Japanese suffered from. He asserted that his green tea was essential for providing the bitter flavor, and thereby keeping the heart healthy.

== Promotion of Buddhism ==
During the Nara and Heian periods in Japan, Buddhism was used as a tool to unify the country. Eisai was a firm believer that it should be Zen Buddhism to aid the protection of the country. He identified previously established schools of Buddhism as responsible for contributing to Japan's struggles.

During this time, three major scriptures were used to promote this idea of a unified Buddhist Japan: the Lotus Sutra, Golden Light Sutra, and the Humane King Sutra (Ninnōkyō). Eisai's famous written piece, The Promotion of Zen for the Protection of the Country (興禅護国論, Kōzen gokokuron), was heavily influenced by the Humane King Sutra, which states, "The preservation of Buddhism is inextricably bound to the preservation of their own country". The Kōzen gokokuron was written with the intention to correct established schools of Buddhism by giving them examples of moral practice and to convince the Minamoto military rulers to support Zen Buddhism and a Zen government. The writing promotes the Zen ideals to bring Buddhism back to its morals and practices.

Eisai's writing depends heavily on the idea that Buddhism is critical for a functioning society. The Kōzen gokokuron is often regarded as nationalistic propaganda, and due to the compromises he made when working to install Zen Buddhism in Japan, people disregard the significance of the Kōzen gokokuron when reading it from a "pure" Zen perspective.

== See also ==
- Buddhism in Japan
- List of Rinzai Buddhists
