= Junsaku Koizumi =

Japanese painter and potter (1924–2012)

Junsaku Koizumi (小泉 淳作, Koizumi Junsaku, 1924 – 9 January 2012) was a Japanese painter and pottery artist.

== Biography ==
Koizumi was born in Kamakura, Kanagawa in 1924. In 1952, he graduated from Tokyo National University of Fine Arts and Music (present name Tokyo University of the Arts; Jap. 東京芸術大学 Tōkyō Geijutsu Daigaku or Geidai 芸大). He held a number of gallery shows in Japan, and painted remarkable images on the ceilings of the Kennin-ji temple in Kyoto (2002), and Kenchō-ji temple in Kamakura (2003). He was a member of no particular school. His ink paintings (suibokuga) of Japan's mountains have received critical acclaim.
