= Yasaka Pagoda =

Pagoda in Kyoto, Japan

- 八坂の塔
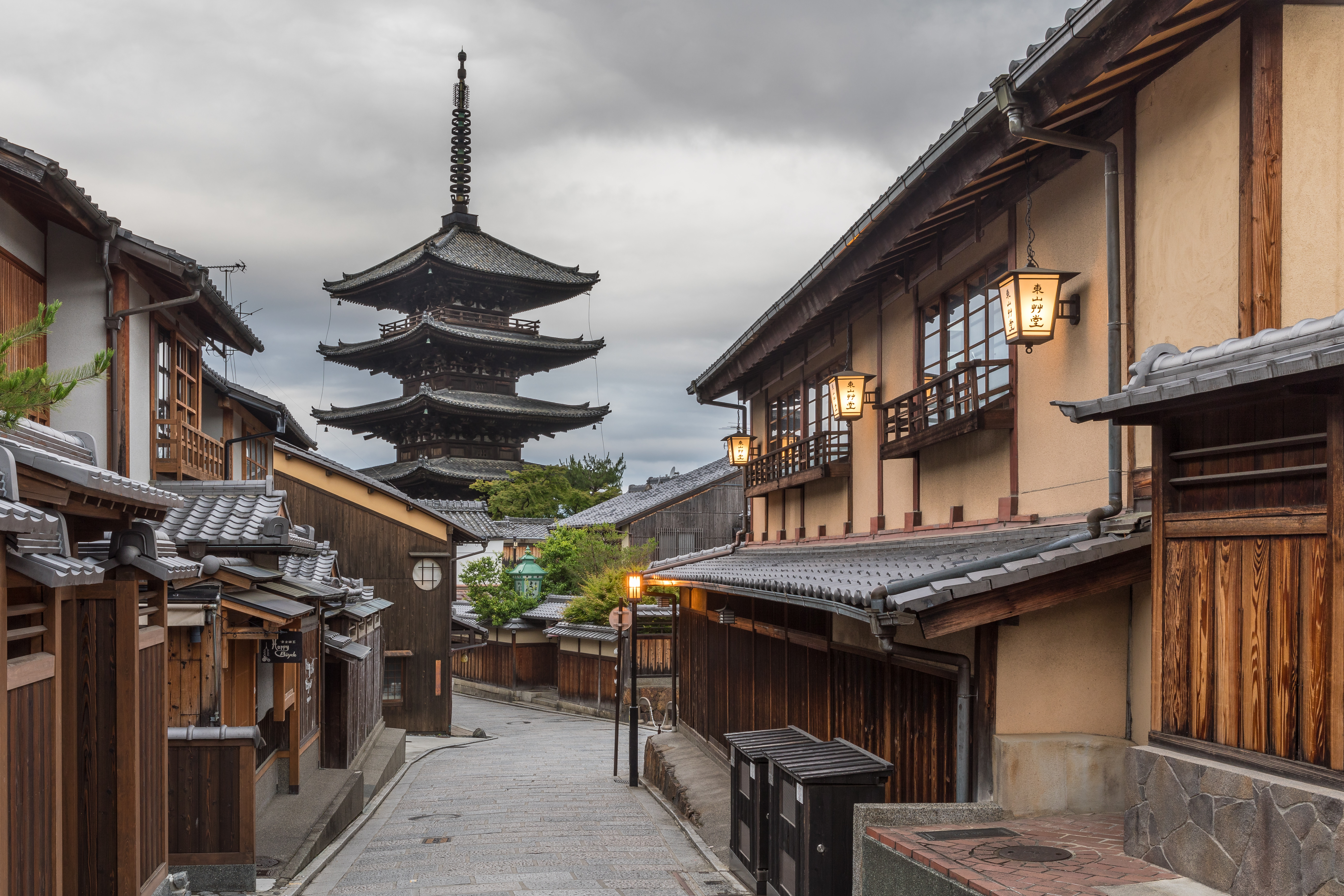
- The Yasaka Pagoda as seen from Yasaka-dori

- Location within Kyoto Prefecture Location within Japan

Religion
- Affiliation: Zen Buddhism
- Sect: Kennin-ji Rinzai

Location
- Location: Higashiyama-ku, Kyoto
- Country: Japan
- Interactive map of Yasaka Pagoda
- Coordinates: 34°59′55″N 135°46′45″E

Architecture
- Established: 7th century
- Completed: 7th century (original); 1440 (reconstruction)

The Yasaka Pagoda (Japanese: 八坂の塔, romanized: Yasaka-no-to), also known as the Tower of Yasaka, is a Buddhist pagoda located in Higashiyama-ku, Kyoto, Japan. The 5-story tall pagoda is the last remaining structure of a 6th-century temple complex known as Hōkan-ji (法観寺). It was founded by the Goguryeo clan that established in Japan, and is the oldest temple in Kyoto. The pagoda is now a tourist attraction.

== History ==
Archaeological evidence dates the foundation of the Yasaka Pagoda to the 7th Century. The founding date is disputed between the reign of Prince Shotoku and the sixth year of the Tenmu period (678 CE). The pagoda and the associated temple were destroyed and reconstructed several times up to 1440, of which the current pagoda stands to this day.

Control of the pagoda was historically disputed between the nearby Shinto Gion Shrine and the Buddhist temple of Kiyomizu-dera, to the point the pagoda was burnt down in May 1179. It was later rebuilt in 1191 with funding from Kawachi Genji noble Minamoto no Yoritomo. In 1240, the head priest of the nearby Buddhist temple of Kennin-ji affiliated the pagoda with Zen Buddhism, which remains the official designation of the Yasaka Pagoda to the present day.

== See also ==
- Kennin-ji
- Kiyomizu-dera
