= Kacho College =

Private women's junior college in Kyoto, Kyoto, Japan

Coordinates: 35°0′25.3″N 135°46′47.1″E

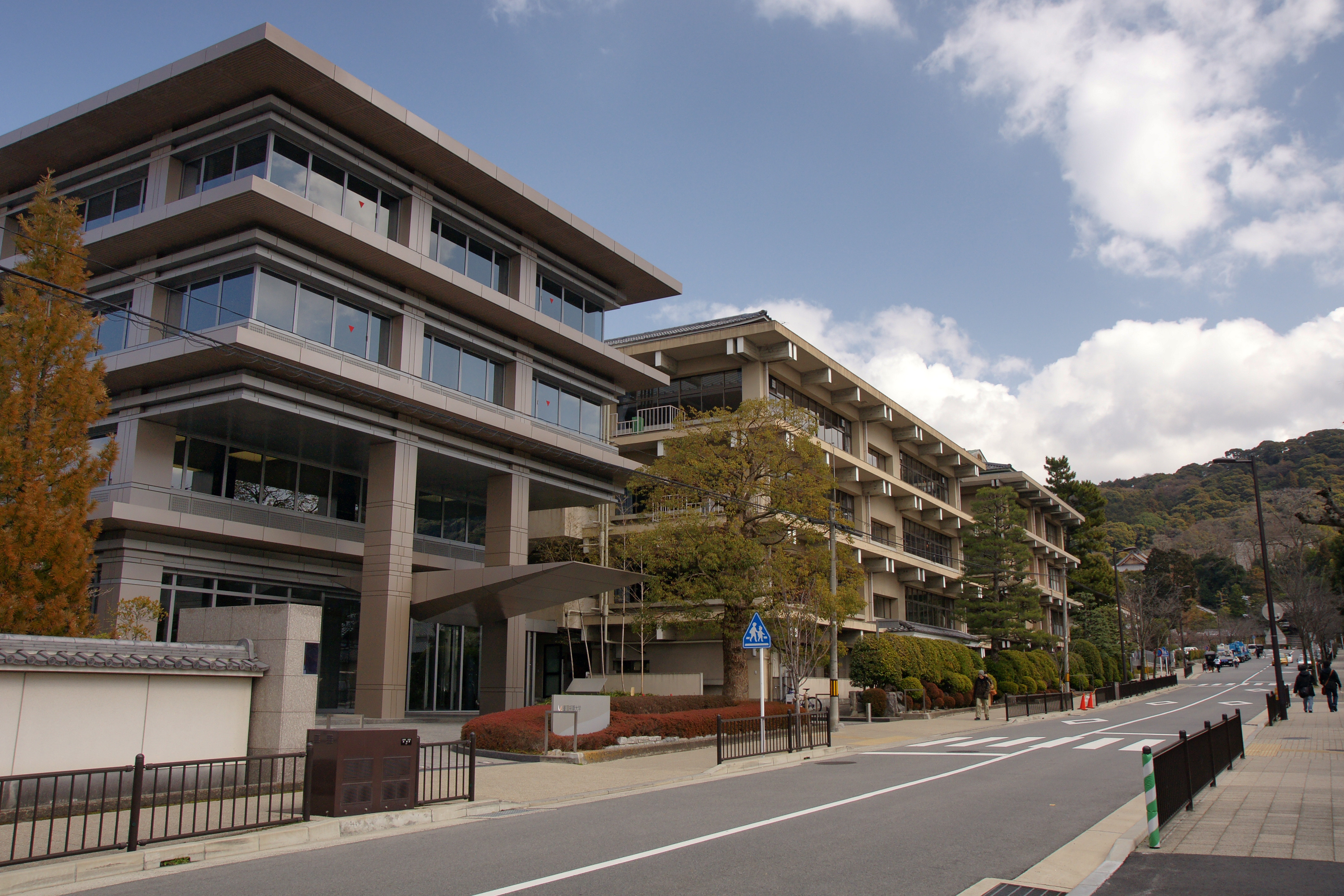
Kacho Junior College

Kacho College (華頂短期大学, Kachō tanki daigaku) is a private women's junior college in Kyoto, Kyoto, Japan, established in 1953.
