= Kennin-ji =

Historic Zen Buddhist temple in Kyoto, Japan

- 建仁寺
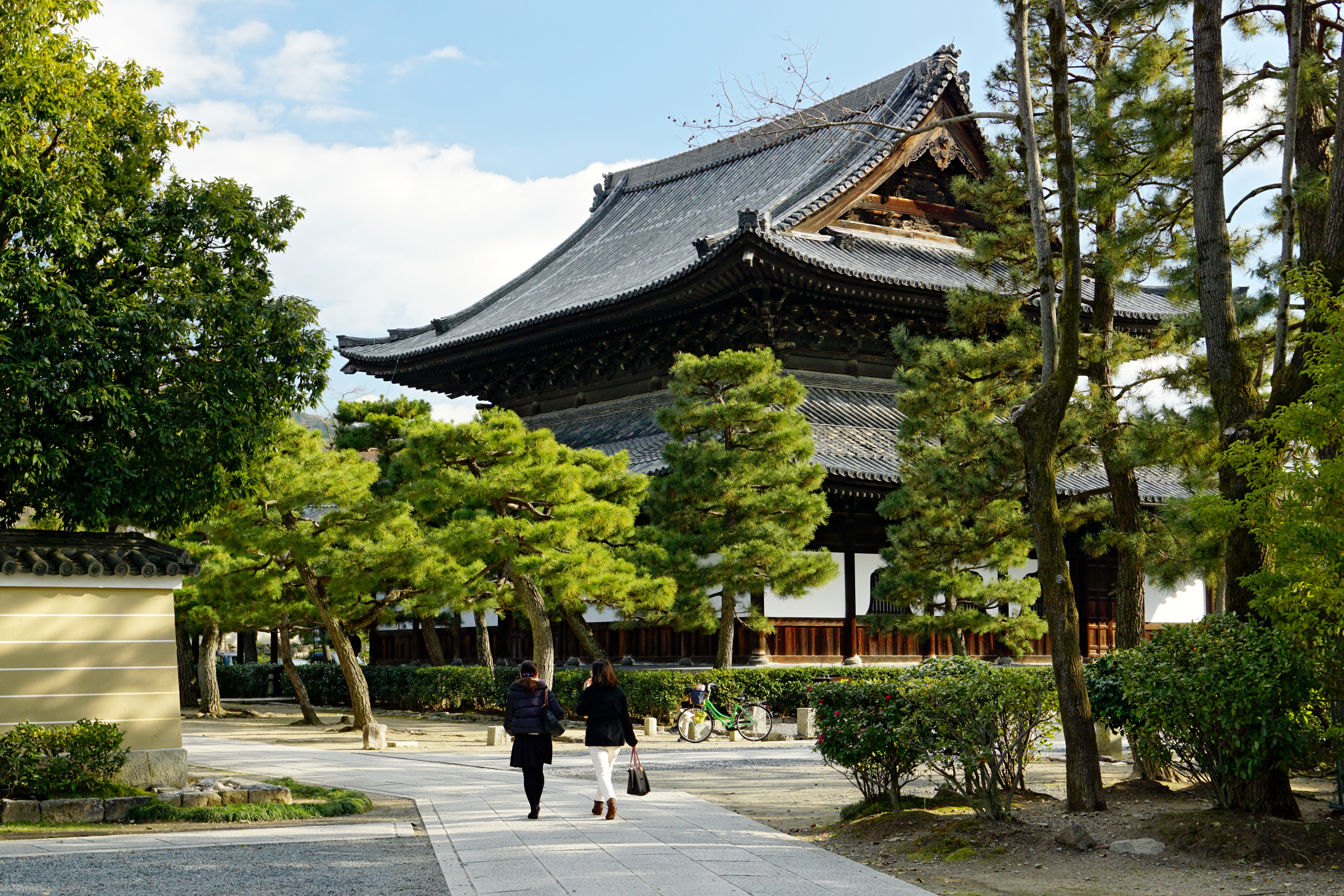
- Main Hall

- Location within Kyoto Prefecture Location within Japan

Religion
- Affiliation: Zen Buddhism
- Deity: Shaka Nyorai
- Rite: Kennin-ji Rinzai

Location
- Location: Higashiyama-ku, Kyoto
- Country: Japan
- Coordinates: 35°00′3.55″N 135°46′25.19″E

Architecture
- Founder: Minamoto no Yoriie and Myōan Eisai
- Established: 1202
- Completed: 19th century (Reconstruction)

Website
- www.kenninji.jp

Kennin-ji (Japanese: 建仁寺) is a historic Zen Buddhist temple in Kyoto, Japan, and head temple of its associated branch of Rinzai Buddhism. It is considered to be one of the so-called Kyoto Gozan or "five most important Zen temples of Kyoto".

== History ==
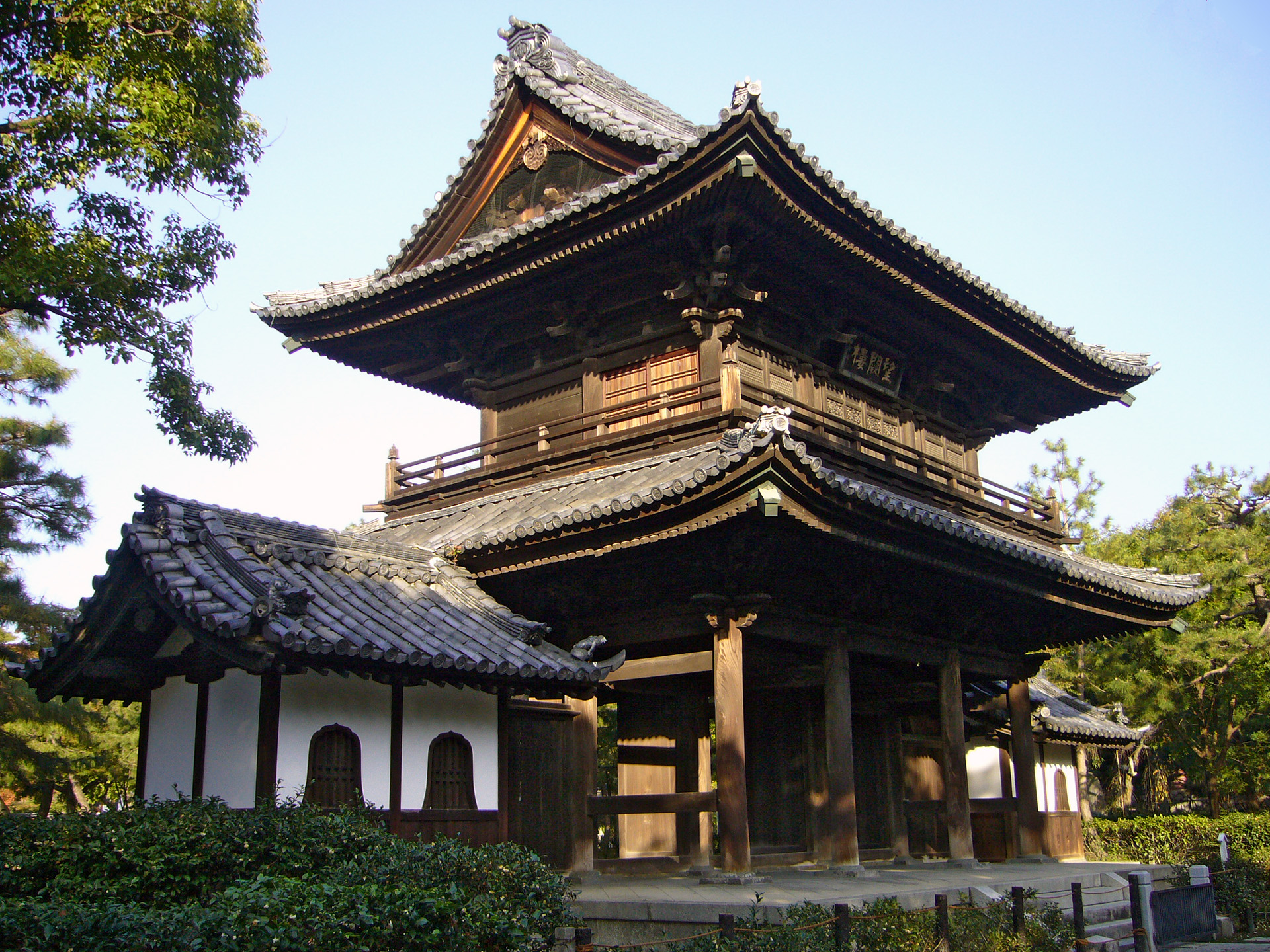
Sanmon (三門, or sammon, main door), bōketsurō (望闕楼)

Kennin-ji was founded in 1202 CE and claims to be the oldest Zen temple in Kyoto. The temple was a replica of public Chinese monasteries found Zhejiang Province, which Japanese monks often frequented during the thirteenth century.

The monk Eisai, credited with introducing Zen to Japan, served as Kennin-ji's founding abbot and is buried on the temple grounds. For its first years the temple combined Zen, Tendai, and Shingon practices, but it became a purely Zen institution under the eleventh abbot, Lanxi Daolong (蘭渓道隆, Rankei Dōryū) (1213–1278). However, the various elements that Eisai is said to have adopted from Japanese Tendai were actually elements associated with Chan Buddhism from the public monasteries of the Song dynasty. Ground plans from the Song dynasty still exist for three prominent monasteries in Zhejiang Province that Eisai visited: Tiantong Mountain, Tiantai Mountain, and Bei Mountain. These plans reveal monastery layouts that were quite diverse, accommodating a wide range of Buddhist practices. It's highly probable that Eisai drew inspiration for the Shingon Hall he constructed at Kenninji from Chinese monasteries. The Calming and Insight Hall at Kenninji may have been influenced by one Eisai encountered at Tiantai Mountain.

The Zen master Dōgen, later founder of the Japanese Sōtō sect, trained at Kennin-ji. It is one of the Rinzai sect's headquarter temples.

=== Kennin-ji school ===
Kennin-ji is the main temple of the Kennin-ji branch, one of the 14 divisions of the Rinzai sect. The branch is regarded to have 72 temples throughout Japan, and approximately 25,000 adherents.

== Architecture ==
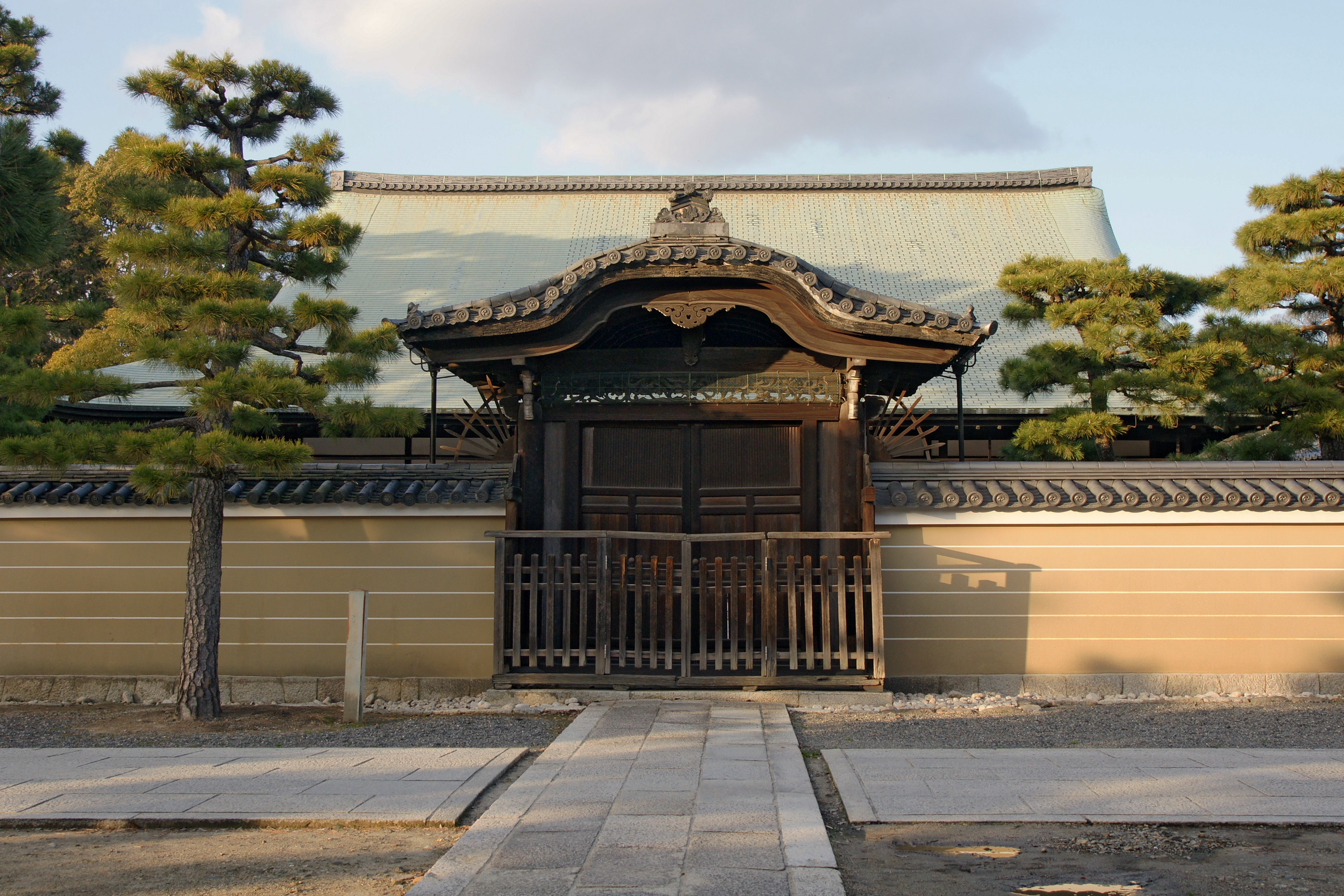
Hōjō (方丈, the Abbot's Quarters), an Important Cultural Property of Japan

When first built, the temple contained seven principal buildings. After suffering from fires through the centuries, it was rebuilt in the mid-thirteenth century by Zen master Enni. In the 15th century, it was damaged by fighting during the Onin War as well as several unrelated fire incidents, precipitating its reconstruction during the 16th century with donations of buildings from nearby temples Ankoku-ji and Tōfuku-ji. Due to further damage and destruction in the succeeding centuries (including the Haibutsu kishaku movement during the Meiji era), many of its structures were also rebuilt during the Edo period and the Meiji, Taisho and Showa eras, such as the Kuri (rebuilt in 1814), the Reito-in (rebuilt in 1853) and the Kaisan-dō (rebuilt in 1884).

Today Kennin-ji's buildings include the Abbot's Quarters (Hōjō), given by Ankoku-ji in 1599; the Dharma Hall (Hatto), built in 1765; a tea house built in 1587 to designs by tea master Sen no Rikyū for Toyotomi Hideyoshi; and the Imperial Messenger Gate (Chokushimon), said to date from the Kamakura period, and still showing marks from arrows. It also has 14 subtemples on the Kennin-ji precincts and about 70 associated temples throughout Japan.

In 2002, the architectural setting was enhanced by a dramatic ceiling painting of two dragons by Koizumi Junsaku (1924–2012). The piece was first painted in the sport hall of a former Elementary school. This bold artwork was installed to commemorate the temple's 800th anniversary. The dragon symbolises the rain of Buddhist teachings. The Shōkoku-ji in Kyoto also features a dragon on the ceiling of its main hall.

== Artworks ==
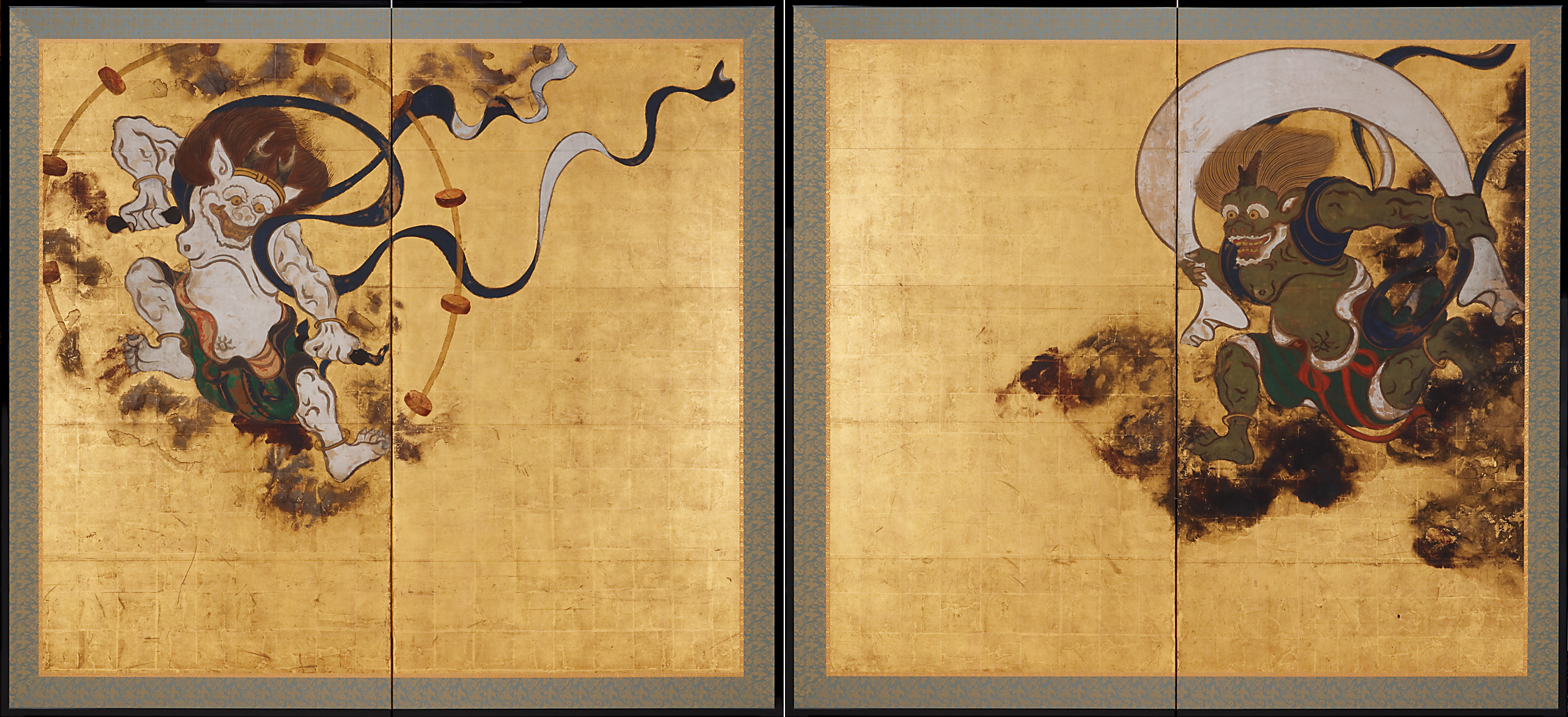
Fujin and Raijin by Tawaraya Sōtatsu, a National Treasure

Kennin-ji contains notable paintings by Tamura Sōryū and Hashimoto Kansetsu. Fujin and Raijin, a pair of two-fold screens by Tawaraya Sōtatsu, are currently on display at the Kyoto National Museum. On the left is Raijin (雷神), a god of lightning, thunder, and storms in the Shinto religion and in Japanese mythology. On the right is Fūjin (風神) or Futen, the Japanese god of the wind and one of the eldest Shinto gods. He is portrayed as a terrifying wizard-like demon, resembling a red headed green-skinned humanoid wearing a leopard skin, carrying a large bag of winds on his shoulders.

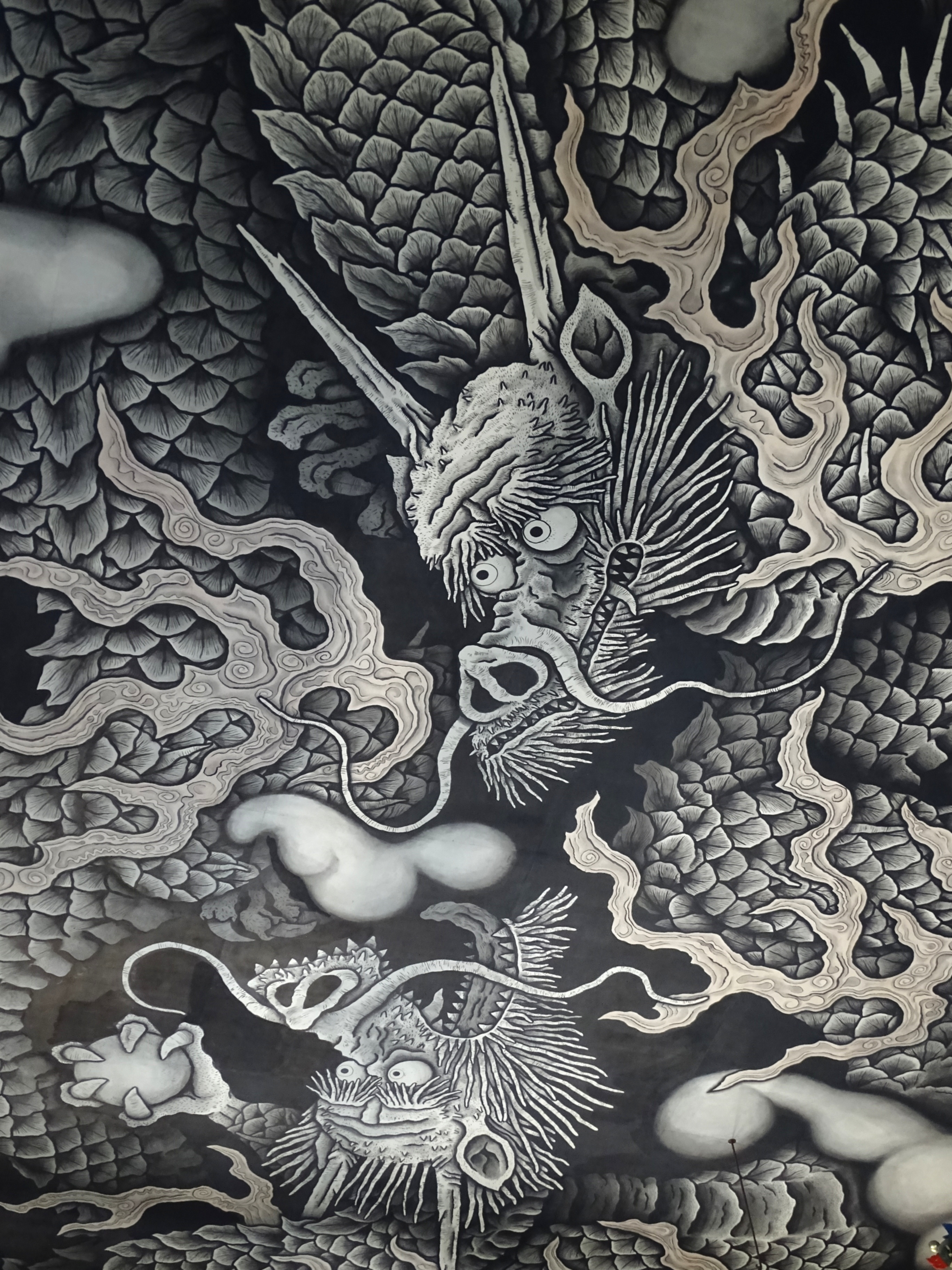
Detail of Twin Dragons Ceiling Painting - by Koizumi Junsaku

According to the Kennin-ji website, "Twin Dragons" by Koizumi Junsaku "commemorates the 800-year anniversary of Kenninji's founding, and a ceremony to mark its installation was given in April 2002. It measures 11.4m by 15.7m (the size of 108 tatami mats) and is drawn with the finest quality ink on thick traditional Japanese paper. It was created in the gymnasium of an elementary school in Hokkaido and took the artist just under two years to complete."

== See also ==
- Yasaka Pagoda
- List of Buddhist temples in Kyoto
- List of National Treasures of Japan (paintings)
