= Japanese Zen =

Zen Buddhist traditions of Japan

Japanese Zen comprises the Buddhist lineages, institutions and practices in Japan that developed from Chinese Chan Buddhism. Its principal surviving denominations are Sōtō, the several branches of the Rinzai school, and Ōbaku. All belong to Mahayana Buddhism and share its teachings of emptiness, compassion, Buddha-nature and the bodhisattva path. Seated meditation (zazen), Buddhist precepts, liturgy, scripture, teacher–disciple transmission and temple ritual have all formed part of Japanese Zen.

Meditation teachings reached Japan before Zen existed there as an independent institution. From the late twelfth century, monks including Eisai and Dōgen established lineages based on Song-dynasty Chinese models. Rinzai became prominent in medieval warrior governments and the Five Mountain System, while Sōtō spread through regional temple networks under Dōgen's successors, especially Keizan. Ōbaku, founded by the Chinese monk Ingen in the seventeenth century, brought contemporary Ming Buddhist architecture, ritual and material culture to Japan.

Zen temples have served not only as places of meditation but also as centers of education, diplomacy, publishing, the arts, funerals, memorial rites and local religious life. Their connections with warrior patrons and with ink painting, calligraphy, tea culture, gardens and restrained forms of architecture contributed to Zen's enduring association with discipline, composure and simplicity. None of these cultural forms arose from Zen alone, but Zen monks, temples and patrons played substantial roles in their development and transmission.

From the late nineteenth century, Japanese teachers and writers—most influentially D. T. Suzuki—made Zen the best-known international name for the wider Chan tradition. Japanese-derived meditation movements, aesthetics and vocabulary strongly shaped global images of Zen. Modern research has examined the selection and reinterpretation involved in this transmission, as well as the active role of Japanese Buddhists in creating forms of practice suited to new conditions. Japanese Zen remains both a living religious tradition in Japan and a major source of global Buddhist practice.

== History ==
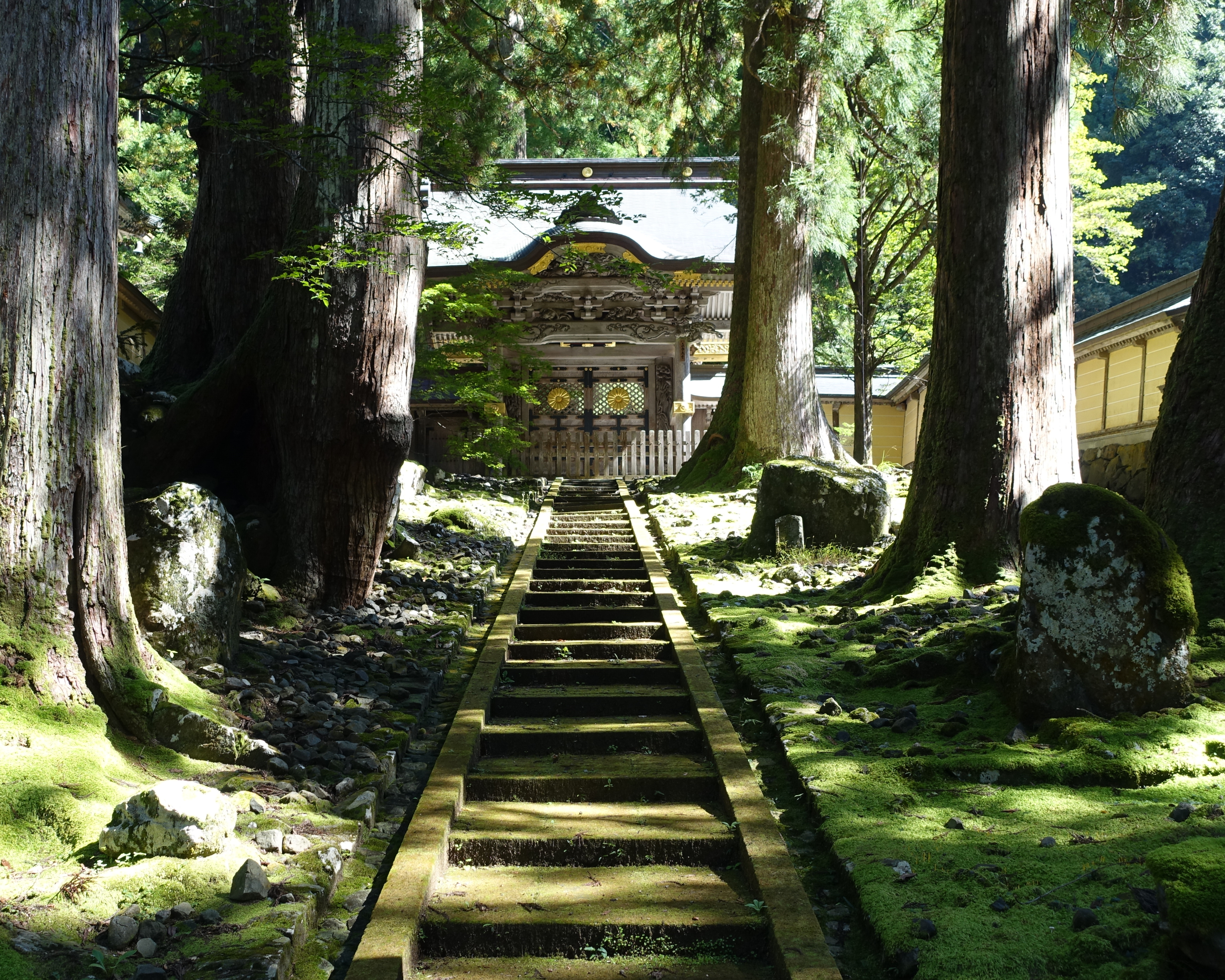
Eihei-ji in Fukui Prefecture, one of the two head temples of Sōtō

=== Early transmissions ===
Meditative practices entered Japan as part of the wider transmission of Buddhism from the Asian continent. The monk Dōshō (629–700), who studied in Tang China, is associated in the fourteenth-century Genkō shakusho with teachings traced to the Chinese Chan figure Huiman. The late date of this account makes it evidence for medieval memory rather than for an independent seventh-century Zen lineage. Dōshō was principally important in the transmission of Yogācāra and in the establishment of a meditation hall at Gangō-ji.

In 736 the Chinese monk Daoxuan (道璿, Dōsen) arrived in Japan and taught Buddhist doctrine, discipline and meditation. His student Gyōhyō later instructed Saichō, the founder of Japanese Tendai. Saichō studied several Buddhist traditions during his journey to China in 804–805 and incorporated elements of Chan into the comprehensive curriculum of Mount Hiei rather than founding a separate Zen school.

The Chinese monk Yikong (Gikū) came to Japan in the ninth century at the invitation of Empress Danrin and taught at Danrin-ji. His community did not survive as a lasting lineage. These early episodes show that meditation and Chan-associated teachings were present within Nara and Tendai Buddhism long before the formation of independent Zen institutions.

=== Kamakura period ===
The first attempt to establish an independent Zen movement was the Darumashū, founded by Nōnin in the late twelfth century. Nōnin did not travel to China but obtained written recognition through disciples whom he sent to the Linji master Zhuoan Deguang. The movement was opposed by established institutions and was later prohibited; a number of its practitioners joined Dōgen's community and contributed to the formation of medieval Sōtō.

Eisai (1141–1215; also read Yōsai) traveled to China twice and returned in 1191 with teachings and practices associated with the Linji lineage. He founded Shōfuku-ji in Hakata and Kennin-ji in Kyoto. Eisai continued to present Zen together with Tendai and esoteric practices; his Kōzen gokokuron (1198) argued that Zen discipline could contribute to the protection and flourishing of the realm. His disciples and later Chinese émigré monks, including Lanxi Daolong and Wuxue Zuyuan, established Chinese-style monasteries and strengthened Rinzai practice in Kamakura.

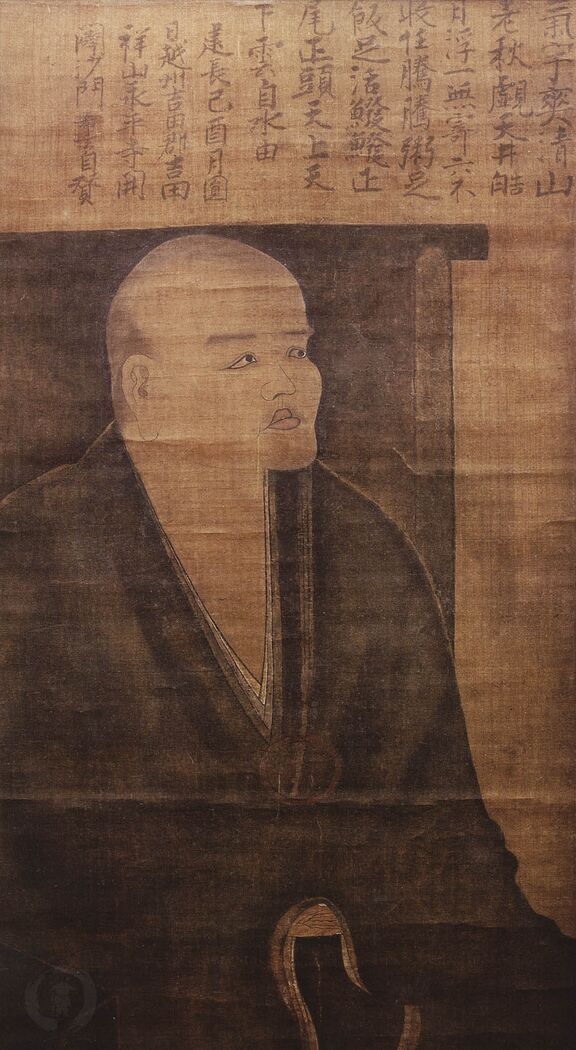
Dōgen, in the traditional portrait known as the Moon-viewing Dōgen

Dōgen (1200–1253), originally trained at Mount Hiei, traveled to Song China with his teacher Myōzen from 1223 to 1227 and studied with the Caodong master Rujing. After returning, he taught at Kōshō-ji near Kyoto. He moved to Echizen in 1243, opened Daibutsu-ji in 1244 and renamed it Eihei-ji in 1246. Dōgen's writings—including the Shōbōgenzō, Eihei Kōroku and monastic regulations collected as the Eihei shingi—joined seated meditation to a broad vision of Buddhist practice embracing conduct, work, ritual, language and everyday activity.

Nanpo Shōmyō studied under the Chinese master Xutang Zhiyu, received recognition in 1265 and returned to Japan in 1267. Through his successors Shūhō Myōchō and Kanzan Egen, his lineage became the Ōtōkan line, from which most surviving Japanese Rinzai lineages descend.

=== Medieval expansion ===
Rinzai monasteries became closely connected with the Kamakura and Ashikaga warrior governments. The Five Mountain System (Gozan) organized leading public monasteries into a hierarchy that provided ritual services, diplomatic personnel, education and literary culture. Its rankings changed repeatedly; the table shows the arrangement promulgated in 1386 under Ashikaga Yoshimitsu.

Five Mountain hierarchy of 1386
Rank	Kyoto	Kamakura
Above the Five Mountains	Nanzen-ji	—
First	Tenryū-ji	Kenchō-ji
Second	Shōkoku-ji	Engaku-ji
Third	Kennin-ji	Jufuku-ji
Fourth	Tōfuku-ji	Jōchi-ji
Fifth	Manju-ji	Jōmyō-ji

Musō Soseki (1275–1351), a teacher to emperors and shoguns, was central to fourteenth-century Rinzai. He served as founding abbot of Tenryū-ji and supported a nationwide network of Ankoku-ji temples and reliquary pagodas. The trading missions known as the Tenryū-ji ships helped finance the monastery. Musō and his disciples also became associated with poetry, calligraphy and temple gardens.

Not all Rinzai temples belonged to the Gozan hierarchy. Independent rinka lineages centered on monasteries such as Daitoku-ji and Myōshin-ji preserved different networks of patronage and training. Figures including Ikkyū, merchants, provincial warriors and members of the imperial court contributed to their cultural influence.

Sōtō expanded chiefly through regional networks. Keizan (1268–1325) and his successors established centers including Yōkō-ji and Sōji-ji, trained numerous disciples and adapted monastic practice to the religious needs of local patrons. Memorial rites, ordinations, protective rituals and the incorporation of local sacred sites accompanied meditation and monastic discipline. This development made Sōtō one of the most extensive Buddhist temple traditions in Japan.

Women also participated in medieval Zen as patrons, disciples and monastics. Mugai Nyodai is remembered as an early Japanese female Zen master. Rinzai convents in Kyoto and Kamakura were organized into hierarchies known as the Ama Gozan, or Five Mountains of convents. Tōkei-ji, founded by Kakusan Shidō, provided a religious community for women and later became known for offering refuge and assistance in marital separation.

=== Early modern period ===
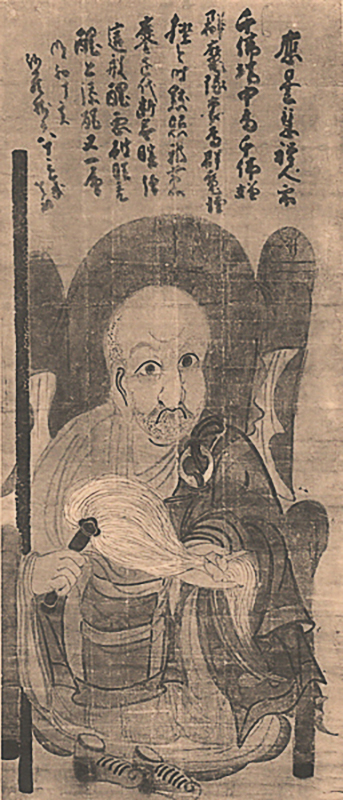
Self-portrait of Hakuin Ekaku, whose teaching line became central to modern Rinzai

The Tokugawa government registered Buddhist temples within recognized denominations and head–branch systems. The temple-registration system connected households with local temples and gave Buddhist institutions a stable place in community life. It also restricted institutional mobility and made funerals, ancestor memorials and parish administration increasingly prominent. Sōtō temples additionally performed healing rites, distributed amulets, venerated local deities and participated in pilgrimage and mountain religion. The religious life of an early modern Zen temple was therefore broader than seated meditation alone.

Rinzai practice was renewed in response to the Ōbaku school, founded in the 17th century. Hakuin Ekaku (1686–1769) partly emulated the emphasis on intensive practice, but rejected the nembutsu-practice. His teaching combined intensive meditation, kōan work, sermons, calligraphy and instruction for lay followers. Hakuin's writings, paintings and teaching lineages became central to modern Rinzai, while curricula developed by his successors continue to shape monastic training.

Ōbaku also influenced Sōtō. Within Sōtō, Manzan Dōhaku (1636–1715) and other reformers sought to replace temple-based succession with direct, face-to-face Dharma transmission from teacher to disciple. Their campaign, often called the Sōtō lineage-restoration movement, reshaped transmission rules and helped establish the early modern understanding of Dōgen as the denomination's founding patriarch.

Takuan Sōhō (1573–1645), associated with Daitoku-ji, wrote on the application of an unattached mind to action. His Fudōchi shinmyōroku, traditionally connected with the swordsman Yagyū Munenori, is an early modern example of Zen language applied to swordsmanship. Later writers gave this particular connection a broader place in accounts of Zen and the samurai.

Ingen Ryūki arrived from China in 1654 and founded Manpuku-ji at Uji in 1661. The Ōbaku community retained Chinese pronunciation in liturgy, late-Ming monastic customs and a renewed emphasis on Vinaya observance. Its architecture, calligraphy, printing, vegetarian fucha cuisine and connections with sencha culture had a wide influence. Although Ingen's lineage was a branch of Chinese Linji, Japanese institutions eventually recognized Ōbaku as a separate denomination.

The Fuke-shū, associated with itinerant komusō and the shakuhachi, also claimed Zen affiliation during the Edo period. Its institutions and privileges were closely connected with Tokugawa regulation, and parts of its lineage history were formulated retrospectively. The Meiji government abolished the organization in 1871, but its music and cultural memory survived.

=== Meiji period and the twentieth century ===
The Meiji Restoration brought the legal separation of Buddhism and kami worship, anti-Buddhist destruction and the loss of many temple lands and privileges. Zen denominations responded with extensive reform. They centralized administration, founded schools and universities, reorganized monastic training, printed editions of scriptures and sectarian texts, established lay associations and participated in social welfare and overseas missions. Zen thinkers joined broader Japanese debates about science, philosophy, education and the place of religion in a modern nation-state.

An 1872 edict removed state penalties for clerical meat-eating and marriage. Over subsequent decades married priests and hereditary temple households became common in many Zen communities, although celibate monastic training continued in specialist monasteries. Temple families could transmit property and sustain local congregations, while the contrast between household priesthood and monastic ideals remained a subject of debate and reform.

Modern institutions also expanded Buddhist education. Komazawa University, Hanazono University and denominational seminaries trained clergy and supported historical, textual and philosophical scholarship. Dōgen, whose writings had long circulated principally within Sōtō institutions, was increasingly studied as a major philosopher and religious thinker. Watsuji Tetsurō's 1926 essay Shamon Dōgen was influential in bringing him to a wider intellectual audience. Women of the Sōtō order developed educational networks and worked for equal recognition of nuns' training and transmission.

Japanese interpretations of Zen also became international. Shaku Sōen attended the 1893 World's Parliament of Religions, and his student D. T. Suzuki presented Zen to English-language readers over several decades. Suzuki emphasized direct realization, freedom from conceptual attachment and the relationship of Zen to Japanese culture, while engaging modern philosophy, psychology and religious pluralism. Japanese scholarship treats these writings within the changing contexts of Suzuki's long career. Robert Sharf relates some of Suzuki's language to modern claims about Japanese uniqueness, whereas Kiyohide Kirita and later researchers emphasize contrary writings and changes of context.

From the late Meiji period through 1945, official publications and programs issued by some Zen denominational administrations and head temples supported state ceremonies, military chaplaincy, fundraising and wartime mobilization. Individual Zen priests and lay writers held positions ranging from enthusiastic nationalism to criticism or resistance. Brian Victoria's Zen at War brought international attention to this history; Christopher Ives placed wartime Zen within the longer Buddhist ideal of protecting the state, while Kemmyō Taira Satō and Kirita disputed particular portrayals of Suzuki. Institutional policies and individual statements are therefore treated separately in historical research.

=== Post-war and contemporary developments ===
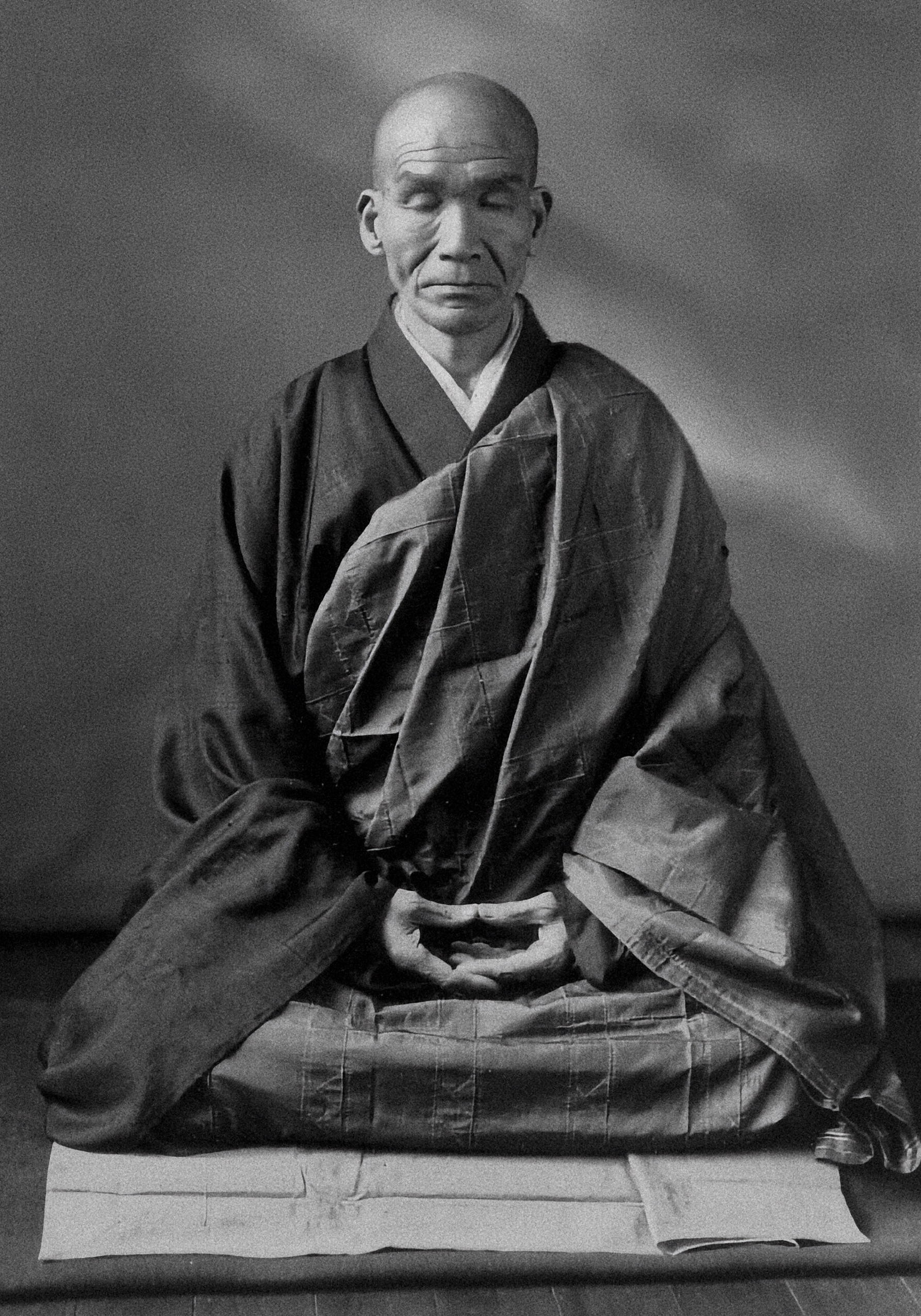
Sawaki Kōdō practicing zazen

After 1945 the Zen denominations rebuilt temples and schools, expanded lay practice and reconsidered their relationship with society and the state. Sawaki Kōdō promoted intensive zazen inside and outside monasteries. His student Uchiyama Kōshō developed an accessible account of shikantaza and community practice at Antai-ji. Their approach influenced later Japanese and international Sōtō communities.

The lay-oriented Sanbo Kyodan, founded by Yasutani Hakuun in 1954, combined elements of Sōtō and Rinzai training and became highly influential overseas despite its small size, through teachers including Philip Kapleau, Robert Baker Aitken and Taizan Maezumi. Shin'ichi Hisamatsu's FAS Society joined Zen practice to philosophy, artistic activity and engagement with modern social questions.

Japanese Zen today includes specialist training monasteries, parish temples, urban meditation groups, university centers, convents and lay organizations. Funerals and memorial rites remain economically and religiously important, but temples also conduct zazen meetings, precept ceremonies, cultural programs, counseling, disaster relief and community activities. The balance among these functions varies greatly by denomination, temple and locality.

The 2025 edition of the Agency for Cultural Affairs' Religion Yearbook, reporting figures collected at the end of 2024, lists approximately 14,400 Sōtō temples, 5,600 temples in the registered Rinzai denominations and 450 Ōbaku temples. These figures count religious organizations reported by the denominations and do not measure the number of active meditators or individual adherents.

== Relationship to Chinese Chan ==
Japanese Zen arose through several transmissions of Chinese teachings, texts, rituals, monastic regulations and lineages. Kamakura institutions drew mainly on Song- and Yuan-period public monasteries; Ōbaku transmitted a later form of Ming Buddhism. Japanese Zen is therefore part of the wider East Asian Chan tradition, but its denominations are products of Japanese as well as Chinese history.

Song Chinese Chan monasteries operated within the wider Buddhist and governmental order. They practiced meditation, liturgy, doctrinal study, precepts, devotional rites and funerals. Many were public monasteries whose classification and appointment of abbots were influenced by the imperial state, officials and literati patrons. Patronage enabled Chan institutions to flourish but also drew lineages into political and institutional competition. Chan became a dominant identity within Chinese Buddhism without becoming a denomination wholly separate from other Buddhist traditions.

Japanese rulers similarly patronized and regulated Zen. The Gozan monasteries served the Kamakura and Ashikaga governments, while Sōtō and independent Rinzai networks spread beyond that hierarchy. In China, Chan remained institutionally embedded in the wider Buddhist order; in Japan, Rinzai, Sōtō and later Ōbaku developed more distinct denominational administrations. These organizations maintained characteristic training systems, texts, temples and regional networks over many centuries.

Lineage histories in both countries joined historical memory to claims of religious authority. Song transmission records systematized genealogies extending back to Tang masters and helped define the Chan identities later conveyed to Japan. Japanese institutions adopted and reinterpreted these genealogies around their own founders, temples and procedures of authorization. Modern historians study these records both as accounts of the past and as documents through which religious communities gave continuity an institutional and ritual form.

Ordination followed different historical settlements. Chinese Chan monastics normally received full ordination under the Dharmaguptaka Vinaya together with Mahayana bodhisattva precepts. Most Japanese Zen developed within the bodhisattva-precept ordination system established after Saichō and connected ordination closely with lineage transmission and denominational ritual. Ōbaku renewed Japanese interest in late-Ming Vinaya observance. The two systems differed in legal form, ritual authorization and the organization of clerical discipline.

Chinese Chan continued to change in the late imperial period through interaction with Pure Land devotion, Vinaya revival, local religion and literati culture. Seventeenth-century revival movements expanded transmission while disputing enlightenment, lineage and legitimate succession. Japanese Zen followed another path through Tokugawa temple networks, Meiji denominations, modern education and international teaching. Both traditions were repeatedly shaped by state policy, patronage, ritual needs and religious reform.

== Schools and institutions ==
=== Sōtō ===
Sōtō recognizes Dōgen and Keizan as its two founders and Eihei-ji and Sōji-ji as its two head temples. Its institutional life combines an extensive parish-temple network, specialist training monasteries, education and international missions. Sōtō teaching gives particular prominence to shikantaza, or "just sitting", and to Dōgen's account of practice and realization as inseparable. Dharma transmission normally authorizes a priest within a specific lineage and is recorded through face-to-face transmission and lineage documents.

=== Rinzai ===
Japanese Rinzai consists of independent branches organized around head temples and preserves historical connections with the former Fuke tradition. Ōbaku is institutionally separate. Modern Rinzai training descends mainly from Hakuin and uses seated meditation, interviews with a teacher and graduated kōan study. Full-time practice is concentrated in training monasteries known as sōdō or senmon dōjō, while most affiliated temples serve local congregations. Recognition of mature realization is traditionally associated with inka, although the terminology and requirements vary among lineages.

The Joint Council for Japanese Rinzai and Ōbaku Zen represents fourteen Rinzai head-temple branches. The Agency for Cultural Affairs additionally lists the Kōshō-ji branch as a separate comprehensive religious corporation, so official lists may contain either fourteen or fifteen Rinzai organizations depending on the institutional definition used.

=== Ōbaku ===
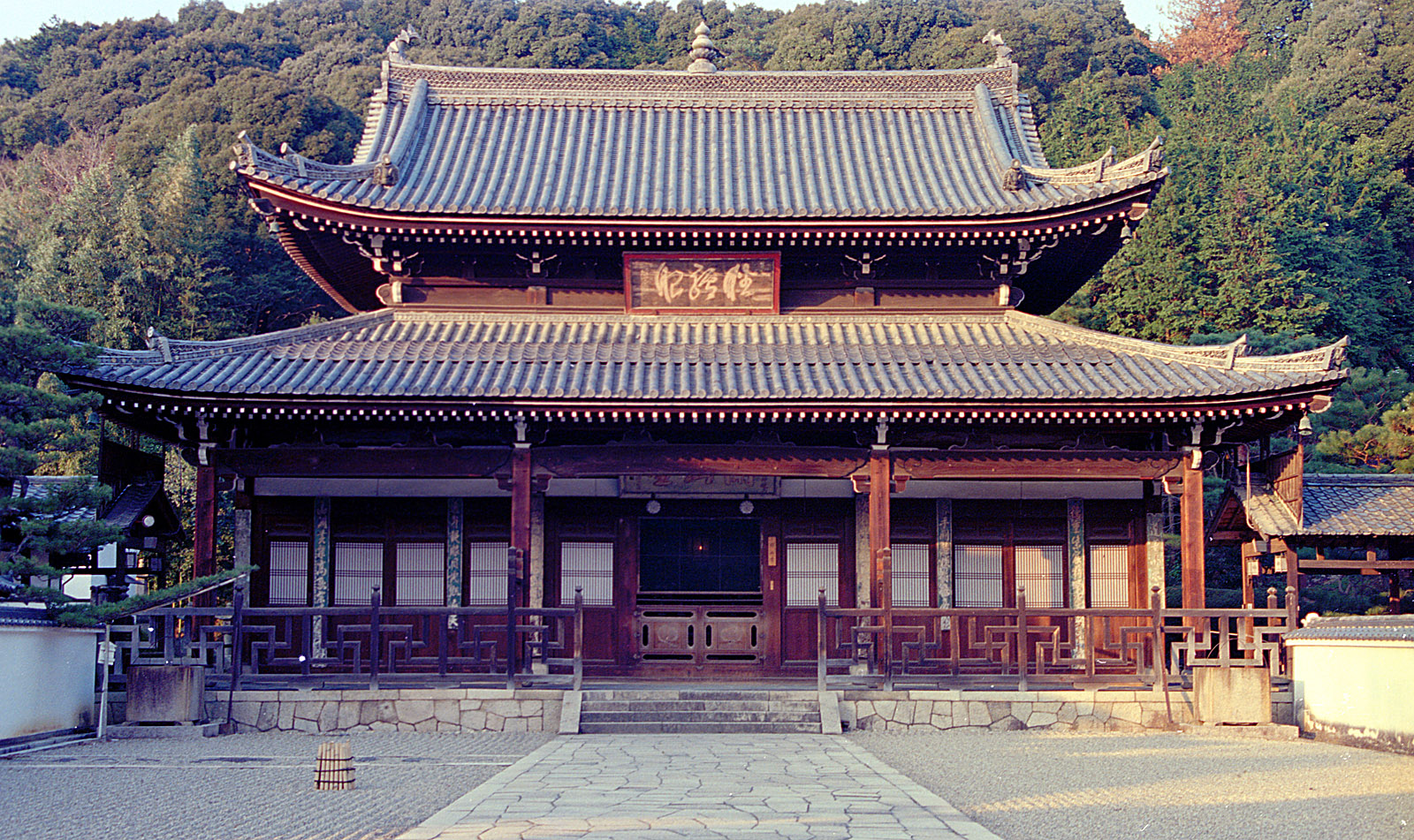
Manpuku-ji in Uji, the head temple of Ōbaku

Ōbaku maintains its headquarters at Manpuku-ji. Its liturgy, architecture and ritual preserve aspects of seventeenth-century Chinese Buddhist culture that differ from established Japanese Rinzai forms. The school combines zazen and kōan teaching with devotional recitation, precepts and elaborate communal ritual. Its printing, calligraphy, food culture and role in the development of sencha gave it an influence larger than its institutional size.

=== Historical and lay movements ===
The Darumashū and Fuke-shū no longer exist as recognized denominations but remain important to the history of Japanese Zen. Modern lay organizations such as Sanbo Zen and the FAS Society operate outside or across older denominational divisions. Numerous independent practice groups also derive from Japanese teachers without forming branches of a Japanese legal denomination.

== Teachings and practice ==
=== Shared Buddhist framework ===
Japanese Zen teaches the central Mahayana doctrines of dependent origination, emptiness, Buddha-nature, compassion and the bodhisattva path. Awakening is commonly described as seeing through attachment to a fixed self and realizing the interdependence of beings. This realization is expressed through conduct and compassionate activity rather than treated only as a private mental state. Different schools vary in vocabulary and method, but none treats meditation as independent of the Buddha, Dharma and Sangha.

The traditional Chan formula of a "special transmission outside the scriptures" expresses the importance of realization and teacher–disciple transmission. It has coexisted with textual study and ritual recitation. Japanese monasteries have copied and printed sutras, lectured on Buddhist doctrine, studied Chinese kōan collections and produced extensive commentaries. Dōgen, for example, repeatedly interpreted Chinese Chan records in the Shōbōgenzō and Eihei Kōroku.

=== Zazen and shikantaza ===
Zazen is practiced in an upright seated posture with close attention to posture and breathing. Periods of sitting commonly alternate with walking meditation (kinhin), chanting, meals and work. In Sōtō presentations, shikantaza emphasizes sitting without grasping after a particular mental state. Dōgen described zazen as the enactment of awakening in practice, a teaching often summarized as the unity of practice and realization. Disciplined repetition and ethical formation remain integral to this understanding.

=== Kōan practice ===
Kōans are records or formulations drawn from Chan encounters, sermons and commentaries. They are used to focus inquiry, test understanding and train the expression of insight. In Rinzai monasteries, a practitioner may present a response during a private interview with a teacher and proceed through a curriculum shaped by the Hakuin lineage. Traditional classifications include cases concerning the Dharma body, dynamic activity, verbal expression, difficult barriers and integration of insight. The curriculum joins embodied presentation, doctrinal understanding, language and conduct.

Sōtō has also made extensive use of kōans in sermons, ritual and commentary. Dōgen cited and reworked Chinese cases throughout the Shōbōgenzō and Eihei Kōroku. The modern contrast between a wholly kōan-based Rinzai and a wholly kōan-free Sōtō therefore describes institutional emphasis rather than the full history of either school.

=== Precepts, ritual and daily life ===
Japanese Zen ordinations commonly transmit bodhisattva precepts formulated as the Three Refuges, the Three Pure Precepts and the Ten Grave Precepts. Precepts guide personal conduct and also structure repentance, ordination, funerals and lineage identity. Ōbaku historically retained a stronger late-Ming emphasis on Vinaya regulations.

Daily life in a specialist monastery is highly regulated. Zazen, chanting, formal meals, cleaning, manual work, study and interviews are arranged by bells, wooden signals and assigned offices. Intensive retreats are called sesshin; the traditional winter observance commemorating the Buddha's awakening is the Rōhatsu sesshin. Monastic discipline seeks to carry attention and consideration for others into ordinary movements rather than confining practice to the meditation seat.

Most Japanese Zen priests serve parish temples rather than live permanently in training monasteries. Funerals and memorial rites give the deceased Buddhist precepts and a posthumous name, situate death within Buddhist teaching and maintain bonds between households and temples. Other activities include ancestor rites, blessings, festivals, pilgrimages and zazen instruction. These functions explain both the social importance of parish temples and the breadth of their ritual and educational life.

== Zen and Japanese culture ==
=== Literature, calligraphy and ink painting ===
Landscape of the Four Seasons: Autumn, a fifteenth-century ink landscape by the Zen monk Sesshū Tōyō

Gozan monasteries were major centers of Chinese learning in medieval Japan. Monks composed poetry and prose in literary Chinese, served as diplomats and produced the body of writing known as Five Mountains literature. Zen networks transmitted books, painting styles, calligraphy and scholarly knowledge between China and Japan.

The direct brushwork of Zen calligraphy, known as bokuseki, and monochrome ink painting became closely associated with monastic personality and insight. Monks such as Mokuan Reien, Kaō and Sesshū Tōyō worked within networks connected to Zen temples. These arts also drew on Chinese literati culture and professional workshops; the category "Zen art" therefore encompasses several historical settings and modes of reception.

=== Gardens, architecture, tea and wabi-sabi ===
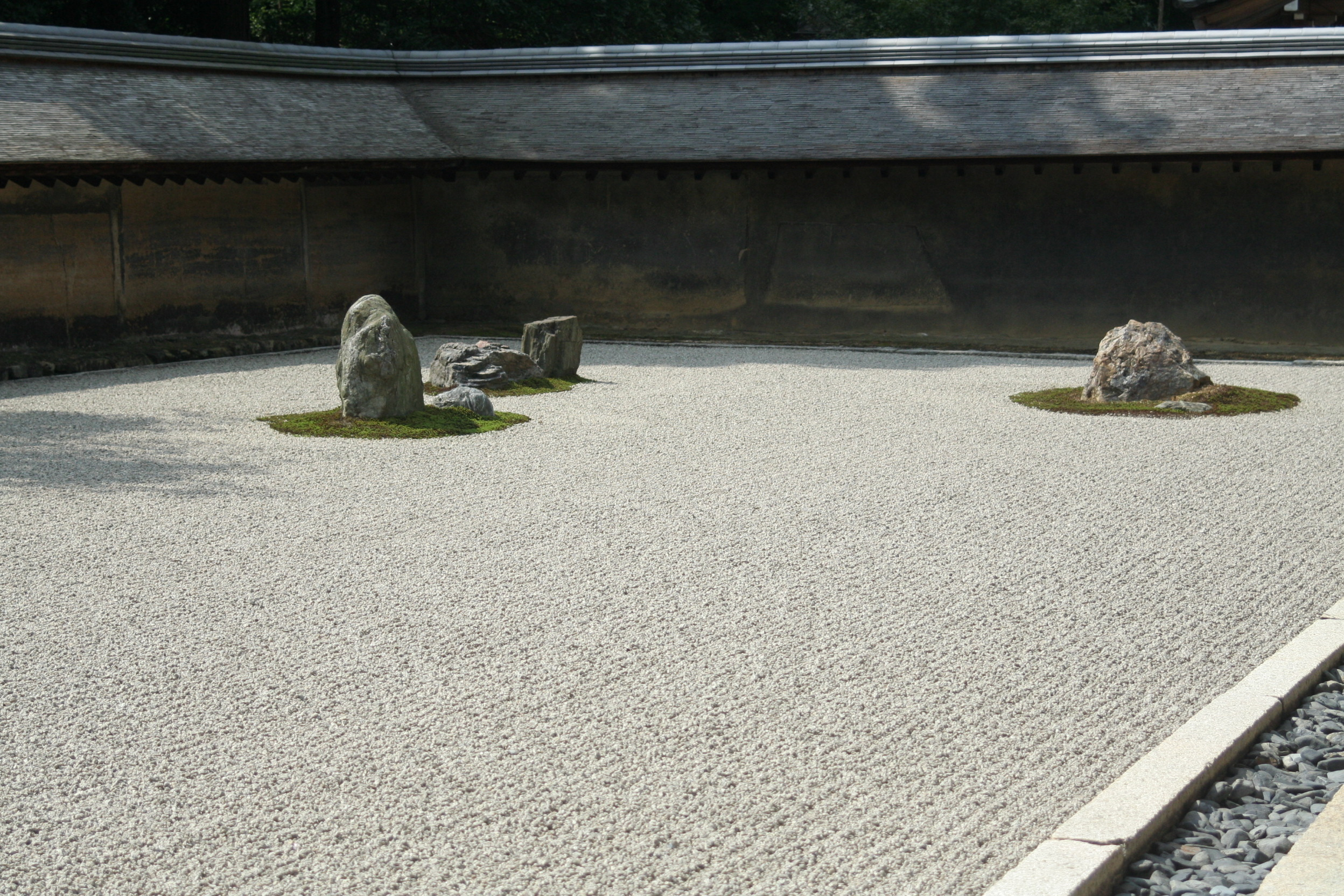
The dry-landscape garden at Ryōan-ji, which became an internationally influential image of Zen aesthetics in the twentieth century

Zen monasteries helped transmit Song architectural forms and created important settings for Japanese garden history. Temples associated with Musō Soseki, Daitoku-ji and later sites such as Ryōan-ji linked composed landscapes, verandas, abbatial residences and ritual movement. Many celebrated dry-landscape gardens are physically located at Zen temples. Kuitert nevertheless argues that interpreting such gardens generally as expressions of Zen philosophy is largely a modern development. The international image of the "Zen garden" grew from the conjunction of temple setting, modern Japanese interpretation and twentieth-century reception abroad.

Tea was cultivated and consumed in several Japanese Buddhist settings before it became a formal art. Zen monks participated in the importation of tea culture, the use of tea in monasteries and exchanges with China. In the medieval and early modern periods, Daitoku-ji monks, merchants and tea masters—including figures in the circles of Murata Jukō, Takeno Jōō and Sen no Rikyū—helped connect tea practice with disciplined attention, calligraphy and compact architectural space. Tea culture was never exclusively Zen, but its interaction with Zen institutions was sustained and influential.

The ideals later grouped under wabi-sabi—restraint, irregularity, weathering and appreciation of impermanence—arose from several currents in Japanese poetry, tea, craft and religious thought. Zen teachings supplied an important vocabulary and institutional setting, while tea practitioners and modern interpreters further shaped the association. Temple interiors using timber, plaster, tatami, paper screens, subdued daylight and framed views contributed to the visual language through which simplicity came to be linked with Zen. These features belong to Japanese architecture and craft more broadly, but Zen sites preserved and publicized a particularly influential combination of them.

=== Warriors, discipline and the image of integrity ===
The relationship between Zen and warriors was historically substantial but varied. Kamakura and Ashikaga rulers patronized Rinzai monasteries; Zen clerics advised warrior governments, conducted memorial rites and served in diplomacy and education. Monastic discipline, composure in the face of death and concentrated action could be interpreted in terms attractive to warrior elites. Takuan's writings supplied an early modern bridge between Zen vocabulary and swordsmanship. These connections helped form the elevated image of Zen as a cultivation of courage, restraint and personal integrity.

Warrior religion also included Shingon, Tendai, Pure Land, Nichiren, Confucianism and kami worship, and no single Zen code governed all warriors. Japanese historians have documented premodern ideals of loyalty, remonstrance, honor and self-command within warrior society. In the late nineteenth and early twentieth centuries, writers systematized bushidō as a national ethic and gave Zen a more prominent place within it. The relationship thus included both medieval and early modern connections and their selective modern expansion.

=== The global image of Zen ===
Outside Japan, "Zen" came to evoke uncluttered space, natural materials, rock gardens, calligraphy, tea, disciplined craftsmanship and calm self-possession. Modern international presentations drew these elements from Japanese temples, arts and forms of training, while funerals, devotional images, parish administration and many communal rituals received less attention.

The image gained authority from the international prestige of warrior culture and Japanese art. Suzuki's writings, museum displays, architecture, literature and post-war design brought these elements together in a readily recognizable aesthetic. Because Japanese teachers, books, arts and institutions reached European and North American audiences early and extensively, ordinary Western uses of "Zen" were shaped chiefly by Japanese-derived forms rather than by direct familiarity with the full histories of Chinese Chan, Korean Seon or Vietnamese Thiền.

== Transmission outside Japan ==
Shaku Sōen's appearance in Chicago in 1893 and Suzuki's English publications created early intellectual interest. Nyogen Senzaki, Sokei-an, Ruth Fuller Sasaki and R. H. Blyth developed further communities, translations and interpretations. Writers including Alan Watts, Thomas Merton, Gary Snyder and the Beat authors carried Japanese-derived Zen vocabulary into philosophy, literature and interreligious dialogue.

After the Second World War, Japanese teachers established durable practice communities abroad. Shunryū Suzuki founded the San Francisco Zen Center; Dainin Katagiri and Taizan Maezumi taught in the United States; Taisen Deshimaru established a large network in Europe; and teachers influenced by Sawaki and Uchiyama spread shikantaza. Sanbo Kyodan-derived communities emphasized intensive lay practice and the possibility of awakening outside traditional monastic careers. These movements differed greatly, but together made Japanese forms of zazen, kōan practice, retreats, robes and teacher authorization central to global Zen.

The process was reciprocal. Overseas practitioners translated texts, questioned inherited hierarchies, expanded lay and women's leadership and developed new forms of community. Some presentations separated meditation from ritual and doctrine, while others maintained close ties with Japanese headquarters. Japanese Zen abroad is therefore neither an unchanged export nor merely a Western invention, but an ongoing set of transnational Buddhist traditions.

== See also ==
- Buddhism in Japan
- Chan Buddhism
- Zen
- Japanese Buddhist architecture
- Japanese garden
- Japanese tea ceremony

== Sources ==
- Arai, Paula Kane (1999). Women Living Zen: Japanese Sōtō Buddhist Nuns. New York: Oxford University Press. ISBN 978-0-19-512393-7.
- Baroni, Helen J. (2000). Ōbaku Zen: The Emergence of the Third Sect of Zen in Tokugawa Japan. Honolulu: University of Hawaiʻi Press. ISBN 978-0-8248-2243-9.
- Benesch, Oleg (2016). "Reconsidering Zen, Samurai, and the Martial Arts". The Asia-Pacific Journal: Japan Focus. 14 (17) e1: 1–24. doi:10.1017/S1557466016012857.
- Bielefeldt, Carl (1988). Dōgen's Manuals of Zen Meditation. Berkeley: University of California Press. ISBN 978-0-520-06835-3.
- Bodiford, William M. (1991). "Dharma Transmission in Sōtō Zen: Manzan Dōhaku's Reform Movement". Monumenta Nipponica. 46 (4): 423–451. doi:10.2307/2385187. JSTOR 2385187.
- Bodiford, William M. (1992). "Zen in the Art of Funerals: Ritual Salvation in Japanese Buddhism". History of Religions. 32 (2): 146–164. doi:10.1086/463322.
- Bodiford, William M. (1993). Sōtō Zen in Medieval Japan. Honolulu: University of Hawaiʻi Press. ISBN 978-0-8248-1482-3.
- Bodiford, William M. (2005). "Bodhidharma's Precepts in Japan". In Bodiford, William M. (ed.). Going Forth: Visions of Buddhist Vinaya. Honolulu: University of Hawaiʻi Press. pp. 185–209. ISBN 978-0-8248-2847-9.
- Borup, Jørn (2008). Japanese Rinzai Zen Buddhism: Myōshinji, a Living Religion. Leiden: Brill. ISBN 978-90-04-16557-1.
- Breugem, Vincent M. N. (2012). From Prominence to Obscurity: A Study of the Darumashū: Japan's First Zen School (PhD thesis). Leiden University. hdl:1887/19051.
- Collcutt, Martin (1981). Five Mountains: The Rinzai Zen Monastic Institution in Medieval Japan. Cambridge, Massachusetts: Council on East Asian Studies, Harvard University. ISBN 978-0-674-30497-0.
- Deeg, Max (2007). "Komusō and "Shakuhachi-Zen": From Historical Legitimation to the Spiritualisation of a Buddhist Denomination in the Edo Period". Japanese Religions. 32 (1–2): 7–38.
- Dumoulin, Heinrich (2005). Zen Buddhism: A History. Volume 2: Japan. Translated by Heisig, James W.; Knitter, Paul F. Bloomington, Indiana: World Wisdom. ISBN 978-0-941532-90-7.
- Foulk, T. Griffith (1993). "Myth, Ritual, and Monastic Practice in Sung Ch'an Buddhism". In Ebrey, Patricia Buckley; Gregory, Peter N. (eds.). Religion and Society in T'ang and Sung China. Honolulu: University of Hawaiʻi Press. pp. 147–208. ISBN 978-0-8248-1512-7.
- Groner, Paul (2000). Saichō: The Establishment of the Japanese Tendai School (2nd ed.). Honolulu: University of Hawaiʻi Press. ISBN 978-0-8248-2371-9.
- Harada, Masatoshi (原田正俊) (1998). 日本中世の禅宗と社会 [Zen Buddhism and Society in Medieval Japan] (in Japanese). Tokyo: Yoshikawa Kōbunkan. ISBN 978-4-642-02768-7.
- Harada, Masatoshi (原田正俊) (2022). 五山 [The Five Mountains]. International Zen Studies (in Japanese). 8: 141–150. doi:10.34428/00013050.
- Hori, G. Victor Sōgen (1994). "Teaching and Learning in the Rinzai Zen Monastery". Journal of Japanese Studies. 20 (1): 5–35. doi:10.2307/132782. JSTOR 132782.
- Ibuki, Atsushi (伊吹敦) (2022). 奈良・平安の禅 [Zen in the Nara and Heian Periods]. International Zen Studies (in Japanese). 8: 91–104. doi:10.34428/00013046.
- Ibuki, Atsushi (伊吹敦) (2022). 近代化と禅 [Modernization and Zen]. International Zen Studies (in Japanese). 8: 177–188. doi:10.34428/00013053.
- Iijima, Takayoshi (飯島孝良) (2022). 鈴木大拙 [D. T. Suzuki]. International Zen Studies (in Japanese). 8: 189–199. doi:10.34428/00013054.
- Imaeda, Aishin (今枝愛真) (1970). 中世禅宗史の研究 [Studies in the History of Medieval Zen] (in Japanese). Tokyo: University of Tokyo Press. ISBN 978-4-13-020024-0.
- Ishii, Kiyozumi (石井清純) (2022). 道元禅師研究の歴史と展開 [The History and Development of Research on Zen Master Dōgen]. International Zen Studies (in Japanese). 8: 115–128. doi:10.34428/00013048.
- Ives, Christopher (2009). Imperial-Way Zen: Ichikawa Hakugen's Critique and Lingering Questions for Buddhist Ethics. Honolulu: University of Hawaiʻi Press. ISBN 978-0-8248-3331-2.
- Jaffe, Richard M. (2001). Neither Monk nor Layman: Clerical Marriage in Modern Japanese Buddhism. Princeton: Princeton University Press. ISBN 978-0-691-07495-5.
- Kasaya, Kazuhiko (笠谷和比古) (2005). 武士道と日本型能力主義 [Bushidō and Japanese-Style Meritocracy] (in Japanese). Tokyo: Shinchōsha. ISBN 978-4-10-603552-4.
- Ketelaar, James Edward (1990). Of Heretics and Martyrs in Meiji Japan: Buddhism and Its Persecution. Princeton: Princeton University Press. ISBN 978-0-691-05599-2.
- Kirita, Kiyohide (1995). "D. T. Suzuki on Society and the State". In Heisig, James W.; Maraldo, John C. (eds.). Rude Awakenings: Zen, the Kyoto School, and the Question of Nationalism. Honolulu: University of Hawaiʻi Press. pp. 52–74. ISBN 978-0-8248-1746-6.
- Kuitert, Wybe (2002). Themes in the History of Japanese Garden Art. Honolulu: University of Hawaiʻi Press. ISBN 978-0-8248-2312-2.
- Levine, Gregory P. A. (2005). Daitokuji: The Visual Cultures of a Zen Monastery. Seattle: University of Washington Press. ISBN 978-0-295-98540-4.
- McMahan, David L. (2008). The Making of Buddhist Modernism. Oxford: Oxford University Press. ISBN 978-0-19-518327-6.
- McRae, John R. (2003). Seeing Through Zen: Encounter, Transformation, and Genealogy in Chinese Chan Buddhism. Berkeley: University of California Press. ISBN 978-0-520-23798-8.
- Moriya, Tomoe (2021). "D. T. Suzuki at the World Congress of Faiths in 1936: An Analysis of His Presentation at the Interfaith Conference". Journal of Religion in Japan. 10 (2–3): 135–160. doi:10.1163/22118349-01002001.
- Moriya, Tomoe (守屋友江) (2022). アメリカ禅の成立 [The Formation of American Zen]. International Zen Studies (in Japanese). 8: 229–240. doi:10.34428/00013056.
- Morrell, Sachiko Kaneko; Morrell, Robert E. (2006). Zen Sanctuary of Purple Robes: Japan's Tōkeiji Convent Since 1285. Albany: State University of New York Press. ISBN 978-0-7914-6677-3.
- Muramatsu, Tetsufumi (村松哲文) (2022). 禅美術研究の現在―展覧会の動向から [Current Research on Zen Art: Trends in Exhibitions]. International Zen Studies (in Japanese). 8: 273–286. doi:10.34428/00013059.
- Nagatomo, Shigenori (2024). "Japanese Zen Buddhist Philosophy". In Zalta, Edward N. (ed.). The Stanford Encyclopedia of Philosophy.
- Sato, Kemmyō Taira (2008). "D. T. Suzuki and the Question of War". The Eastern Buddhist. 39 (1): 61–120. JSTOR 44362558.
- Satō, Rentarō (佐藤錬太郎) (2000). 沢庵宗彭『不動智神妙録』の諸本 [The Textual Recensions of Takuan Sōhō's Fudōchi shinmyōroku]. Indo Tetsugaku Bukkyōgaku (in Japanese). 15: 269–288.
- Schlütter, Morten (2008). How Zen Became Zen: The Dispute over Enlightenment and the Formation of Chan Buddhism in Song-Dynasty China. Honolulu: University of Hawaiʻi Press. ISBN 978-0-8248-3255-1.
- Sharf, Robert H. (1993). "The Zen of Japanese Nationalism". History of Religions. 33 (1): 1–43. doi:10.1086/463354.
- Sharf, Robert H. (1995). "Sanbōkyōdan: Zen and the Way of the New Religions". Japanese Journal of Religious Studies. 22 (3–4): 417–458. doi:10.18874/jjrs.22.3-4.1995.417-458.
- Tachi, Ryūshi (舘隆志) (2022). 禅宗における茶の受容と継承―禅と茶を考える [The Reception and Transmission of Tea in Zen Buddhism]. International Zen Studies (in Japanese). 8: 287–304. doi:10.34428/00013060.
- Takenuki, Genshō (竹貫元勝) (1989). 日本禅宗史 [History of Japanese Zen] (in Japanese). Tokyo: Daizō Shuppan. ISBN 978-4-8043-1018-3.
- Tokuno, Takayuki (徳野崇行) (2022). 食と禅 [Food and Zen]. International Zen Studies (in Japanese). 8: 305–316. doi:10.34428/00013061.
- Tweed, Thomas A. (2005). "American Occultism and Japanese Buddhism: Albert J. Edmunds, D. T. Suzuki, and Translocative History". Japanese Journal of Religious Studies. 32 (2): 249–281.
- Uchiyama, Kōshō (2004). Opening the Hand of Thought: Foundations of Zen Buddhist Practice. Translated by Okumura, Shōhaku; Leighton, Taigen Daniel. Boston: Wisdom Publications. ISBN 978-0-86171-357-8.
- Williams, Duncan Ryūken (2005). The Other Side of Zen: A Social History of Sōtō Zen Buddhism in Tokugawa Japan. Princeton: Princeton University Press. ISBN 978-0-691-11928-1.
- Wu, Jiang (2008). Enlightenment in Dispute: The Reinvention of Chan Buddhism in Seventeenth-Century China. Oxford: Oxford University Press. ISBN 978-0-19-533357-2.
- Yoshizawa, Katsuhiro (芳澤勝弘) (2022). 白隠研究の現状と課題 [The Current State and Problems of Hakuin Studies]. International Zen Studies (in Japanese). 8: 163–176. doi:10.34428/00013052.
