= Kakusan-ni =

Japanese Buddhist nun (1252–1306)

- 覚山尼
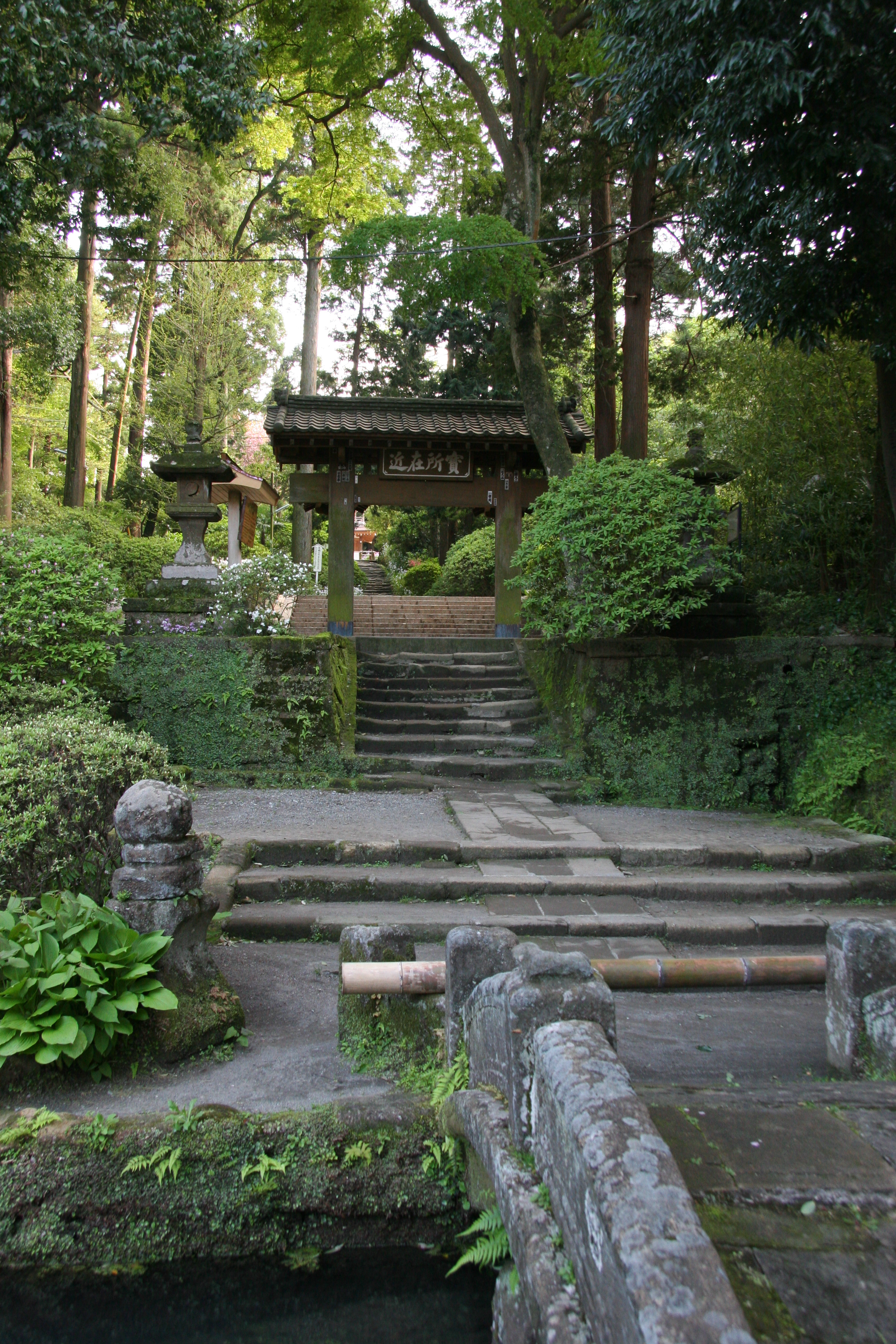
- Tōkei-ji temple in Kamakura, Japan
- Born: August 10, 1252
- Died: November 15, 1306 (aged 54)
- Other names: Kakusan Shidō; Horiuchi-dono; Chōon'in
- Known for: Zen Buddhist nun; Founding abbess of Tōkei-ji
- Spouse: Hōjō Tokimune
- Children: Hōjō Sadatoki
- Father: Adachi Yoshikage

Kakusan-ni (Japanese: 覚(かく)山(さん)尼(に), August 10, 1252 – November 15, 1306), also known as Kakusan Shidō (覚山志道), was a Japanese Buddhist nun and widow of Hōjō Tokimune (1251–1284), the eighth Shikken regent of the Kamakura shogunate. She was the founding abbess of Tōkei-ji temple in Kamakura, noted for its long history as a refuge for women seeking divorce from their husbands. Her many other names included Lady Horiuchi (堀内殿, Horiuchi-dono) and the posthumous name of Chōon’in.

== Early life and family ==
Lady Horiuchi was born in 1252 to the powerful Adachi clan. Her father was Yoshikage, the commander of Akita Castle; her mother was the daughter of Hōjō Tokifusa. She was the last of Yoshikage's eleven children, according to Lineages of the Higher and Lesser Aristocracy. (Note: According to Morrell and Morrell, this volume, Sonpi bunmyaku, compiled by Tōin Kinsada (1340–1399), is a "monumental" work "although sometimes questionable".) After her father died in 1253, she was raised by her older brother Adachi Yasumori, who succeeded Yoshikage as head of the clan and as her custodian.

Lady Horiuchi and Tokimune, her cousin and future husband, were likely well acquainted from a very young age; Tokimune himself was born at the Adachi residence in Kamakura.

== Marriage and child ==
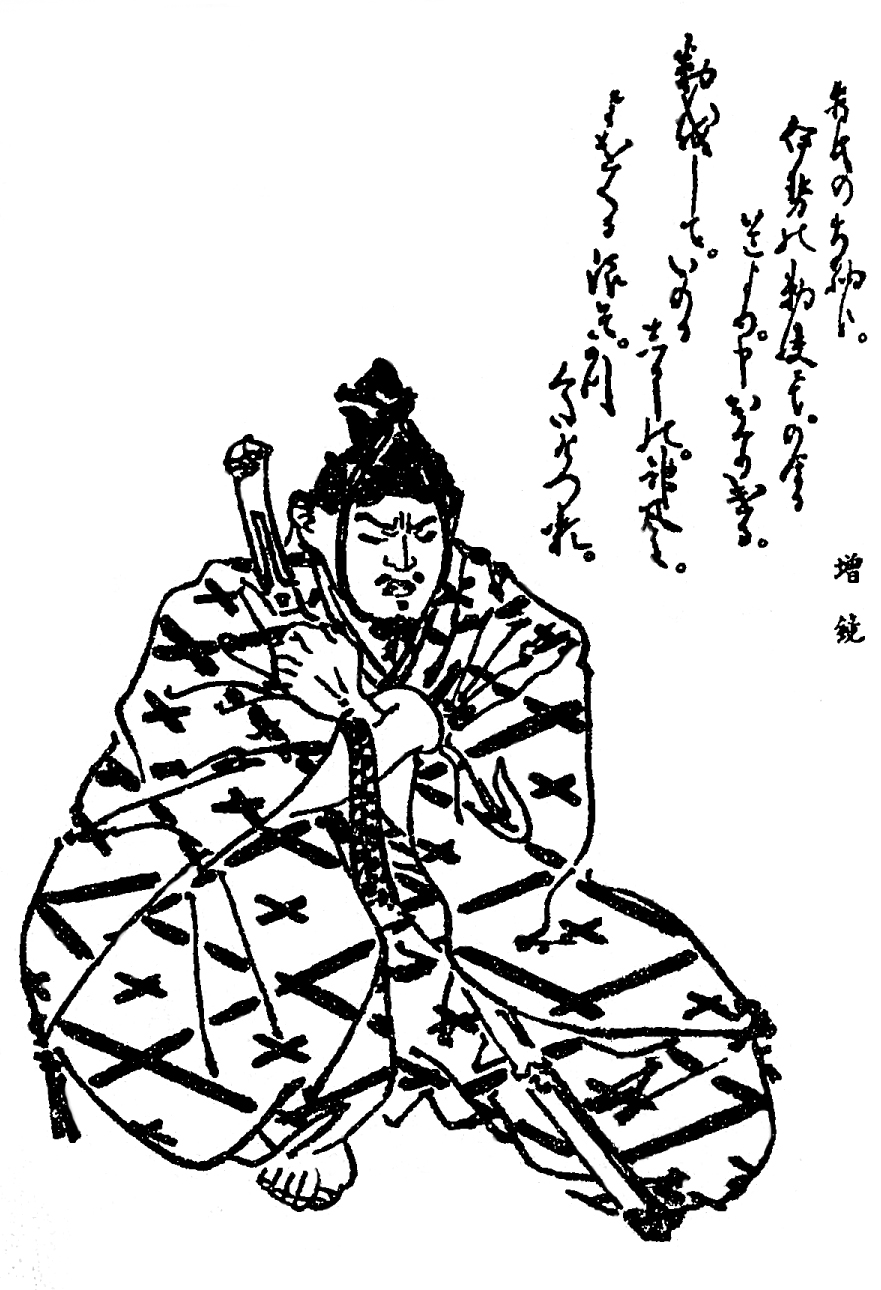
Hōjō Tokimune (Edo period illustration)

In 1261, Lady Horiuchi married Hōjō Tokimune when she was nine, and he was ten years old. They moved together from the Adachi household to Tokimune's own residence. Nearly seven years later, Tokimune became regent to the shōgun, and de facto the most powerful man in the country. As a young woman from the samurai or warrior class, she always carried a ten-inch-long samurai knife.

At the age of 19, Lady Horiuchi gave birth to a son, Hōjō Sadatoki, Tokimune's legitimate heir. Sadatoki's wet nurse was the wife of Taira no Yoritsuna, who would later wield influence over her son.

In 1274 and in 1281, Tokimune successfully repelled the Mongol invasions of Japan, but at considerable cost to the Kamakura shogunate, both financially and politically.

== Religious life ==
Both Lady Horiuchi and Hōjō Tokimune studied the practice of Zen Buddhism, including meditation, under Mugaku Sogen (1226–1286), who emigrated from Song dynasty China and became the founding abbott of Engaku-ji. In light of their shared interest in religion and spirituality, historians have speculated that Horiuchi and Tokimune were happily married.

- For countless aeons all has been a dream,
- And none can tell the length of the road ahead.
- Love and gratitude are severed by one sword stroke,
- The sun burns, and fragrant are the myriad trees.

— Mugaku Sogen, "Shidō Daishi (i.e. Kakusan) Takes the Tonsure"

In early 1284, Lady Horiuchi and Tokimune took the tonsure, shaving their heads after Tokimune suddenly became ill. She was given the Buddhist name Kakusan Shidō, and took on the robes of a nun. Mugaku composed several verses in Chinese to commemorate the occasion of their conversion, including "Shidō Daishi [i.e., Kakusan] Takes the Tonsure".

=== Death of Tokimune and Shimotsuki incident ===
In 1284, Tokimune died at the young age of 34. Their 13-year-old son Sadatoki succeeded Tokimune as Hōjō regent. Under the influence of his advisor Taira no Yoritsuna, many members of the Adachi clan, including Kakusan's brother and former guardian Yasumori, were assassinated in what came to be called the Shimotsuki ("Eleventh Month") incident. Many suspected followers of Yasumori were attacked and killed, and more than 50 men committed suicide following the incident, while still others went into exile.

=== Founding of Tōkeiji ===
In 1285, Kakusan-ni (Note: Literally "Nun Kakusan" or "Abbess Kakusan".) and Sadatoki founded Tōkei-ji as a Rinzai sect convent located near Engaku-ji, now part of North Kamakura. Kakusan was the founding abbess, while Sadatoki was the lay patron. From Tōkeiji, Kakusan-ni would have been able to see the former home she had shared with Tokimune.

==== Origins as a divorce temple ====
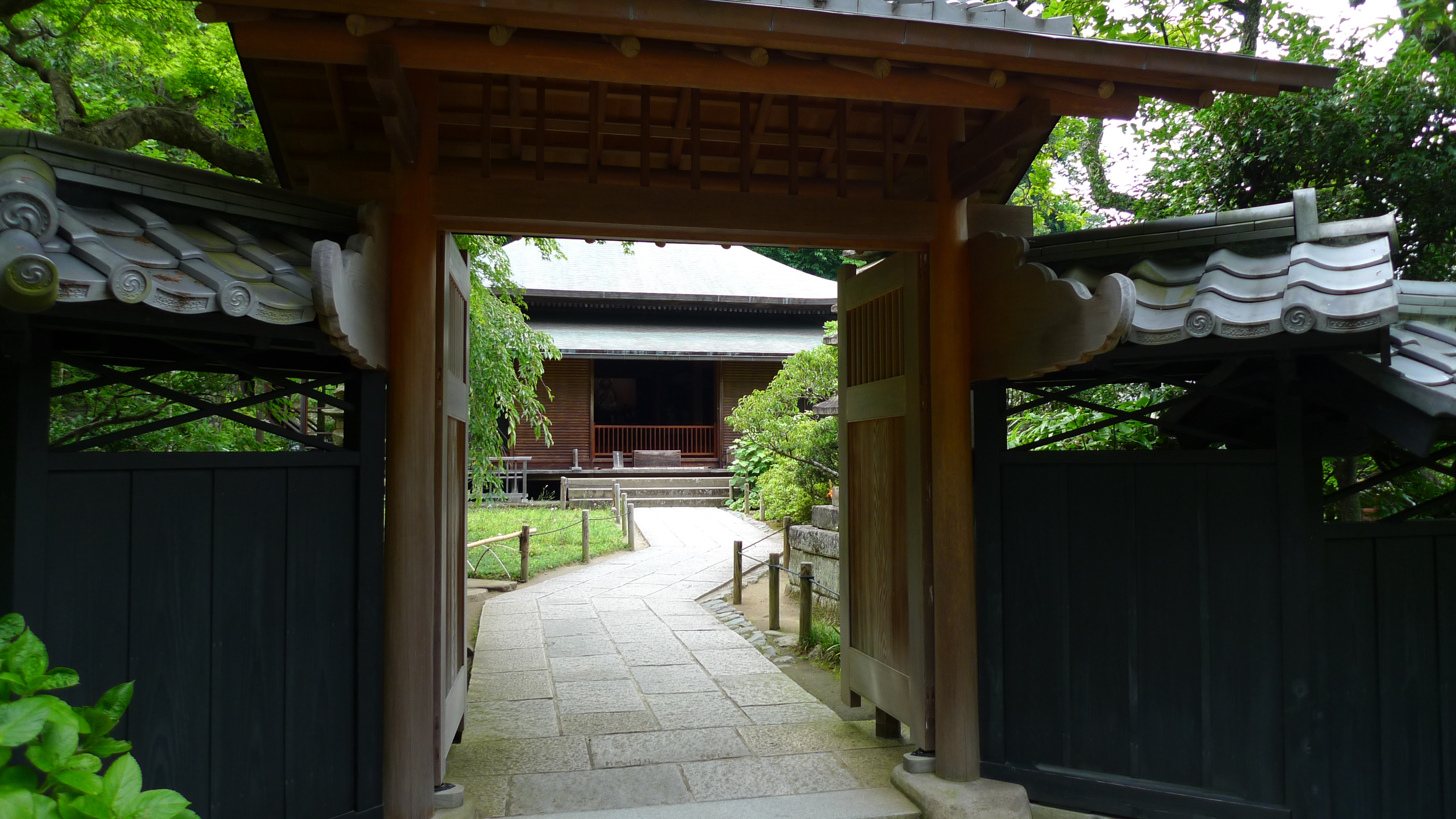
Temple grounds of Tōkei-ji, founded by Kakusan-ni in 1285, in 2009

Despite her popular reputation as the founder of Tōkei-ji as a “divorce temple”, there is no hard evidence confirming that Kakusan-ni had specifically intended Tōkei-ji as a refuge for women fleeing their husbands. One historical text suggests that Kakusan-ni had asked her son Sadatoki to enact a temple law at Tōkei-ji to help women seeking separation from their husbands, and that he in turn asked the emperor, who approved the request. Although temple tradition maintains that Tōkei-ji was authorized from the start to grant divorces to women who had served in its convent for a period of time, the earliest divorce certificate the temple has in its records is dated 1783. Other historians have pointed to the short story, Karaito-zōshi, which depicts Tōkei-ji as a sanctuary, as evidence that it had already developed a reputation as a safe haven for women as early as the Muromachi period.

Recent historians including Sachiko Kaneko Morrell and Robert E. Morell have suggested that Kakusan-ni's interest in providing sanctuary to others was likely influenced by the fact that so many members of her own family were killed or forced into exile following the Shimotsuki incident. Thus, another theory is that Tōkei-ji initially had its roots in providing asylum more generally, and that its function as a divorce temple was a later development.

=== Transcription of the Garland Sutra ===
Following Tokimune's death, Kakusan-ni took on the task of copying the entire text of the Garland Sutra in his memory, taking an entire year to transcribe 80 volumes. The scrolls she transcribed were formally presented at the third memorial anniversary of his death, and later stored at Engaku-ji, in a stupa commissioned by Sadatoki.

=== Kamakura Zen kōan ===
In 1545, the Rinzai monk Muin Hōjō published a compilation of Kamakura Zen kōan, called Word Weeds in Southern Sagami Province. The volume includes several anecdotes about Kakuzan Shidō.

==== Seal of succession ====
According to the kōan, in 1304, Shidō was conferred the inka or "seal of succession" as a Zen Buddhist master, by Tōkei, the fourth abbott of Engaku-ji. A master of novices who opposed her confirmation challenged her by asking, "In our lineage, anyone receiving transmission must expound on the Discourses of Lin-chi (Rinzai-roku). Do you know this work?"

Acknowledging that teachers of Zen were typically literary scholars who were lecturers, Shidō placed her knife before her and replied, "As a woman from a military family, however, I place my dagger before me. What need have I for books?"

==== Tōkei-ji Mirror Zen ====
Another kōan describes Kakusan-ni's practice of meditation before a mirror, which might enable her to "see into her own nature" and attain enlightenment. Word Weeds attributes the following lines of poetry to Kakusan-ni:

Monogoto ni
Kokoro tomoneba
Kumori nashi
Migaku to iu mo
Mayoi narikeri

Translation:

Since not a thing
Takes lodging in the mind
It is untainted;
To speak of polishing
Is itself illusion.

The practice of zazen while sitting in front of the mirror thus became a tradition among nuns at Tōkeiji, who would meditate on the question: "Where is a single feeling, a single thought, in the mirror image at which I gaze?"

== Death and legacy ==
Kakusan-ni is believed to be buried at Butsunichian, the Hōjō family memorial at Engakuji, along with Tokimune. After her death in 1306, she was given the name Chōon’in. In 1384, a fire destroyed the Garland Stupa at Engaku-ji, and the fate and whereabouts of Kakusan-ni's copy of the Garland Sutra, if it still exists, are unknown.

According to temple historians, Tōkei-ji retained the temple law allowing women to cut ties with their husbands, for more than 600 years. During the Edo period, Tōkei-ji was one of two temples recognized by the Tokugawa shogunate as asylums for women. The divorce law was abolished in 1871 due to anti-Buddhist sentiment, and the temple ceased to be a nunnery in 1902.

== Portrayal in popular culture ==
In 2001, NHK broadcast a year-long historical TV drama series titled Hōjō Tokimune. In the series, Kakusan-ni is called Noriko (祝子), although her actual given name is unknown. She was portrayed by Hikaru Nishida, with other actors playing her as a child and as an older woman.

== See also ==
- Mugai Nyodai
- Hōjō Masako
