= Beatrice Erskine Lane Suzuki =

American Theosophist (1878–1939)

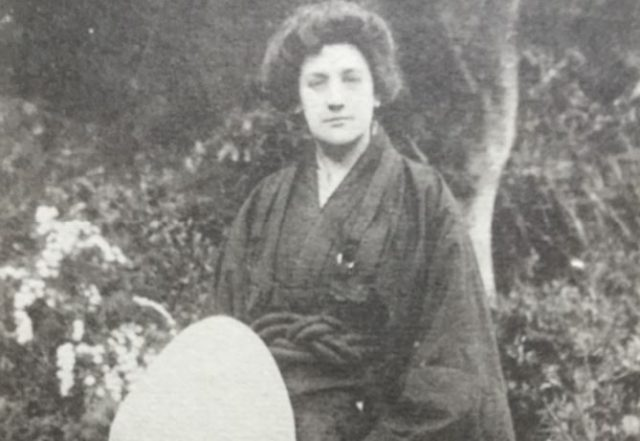
Beatrice Erskine Lane

Beatrice Erskine Lane Suzuki (c. 1878–1939) was an American Theosophist, who was instrumental in promoting Theosophy in Japan. Born in Newark, New Jersey, Lane was educated at Radcliffe College, where one of her tutors was William James, graduating in 1898. She also completed a Master of Arts degree in social work at Columbia University in 1908.

Lane Suzuki is often eclipsed by her famous husband, the Japanese Buddhist scholar and educator D. T. Suzuki, whom she married in 1911.

The Suzukis, along with her mother, joined the Tokyo International Lodge of the Theosophical Society in 1920. Lane Suzuki fulfilled various official roles in the Lodge. Lane Suzuki and her husband later founded the Mahayana Lodge with a more explicitly Buddhist focus. Letters from the time speak of the difficulty of spreading Theosophy in Buddhist Japan, since Theosophy draws heavily on Buddhism.

Lane Suzuki published numerous books on Buddhism and Japanese culture. These have seen many reprints and editions as well as being translated into many languages.

== Death ==
Lane Suzuki died in Japan on 16 July 1939, having left the country only once after arriving in 1911, when she took a short trip back to the United States in 1916 to sort out her mother’s affairs. Her remains are interred next to those of her husband in the graveyard of Tōkei-ji temple in Kamakura.

After her death in 1939, her husband compiled and published Impressions of Mahāyāna Buddhism, a collection of thirty-one of her major essays.

== Publications ==
- 1931: Kōya San: the home of Kobō Daishi and his Shingon doctrine.
- 1932: Noḡaku: Japanese nō plays.
- 1933: Buddhism and practical life.
- 1934: Buddhist readings.
- 1938: Mahayana Buddhism. London: The Buddhist Lodge.
- 1940: Impressions of Mahayana Buddhism. The Eastern Buddhist Society, Otani Buddhist College; London: Luzac and Company, London.
- 1959: Mahayana Buddhism: a brief outline.

== See also ==
- Buddhism and Theosophy
- Japanese Zen
- Timeline of Zen Buddhism in the United States
- Theosophy
- Zen Narratives

== Sources ==
- Algeo, Adele S. 2007 "Beatrice Lane Suzuki: An American Theosophist in Japan." Quest 95.1 (January–February 2007): 13–17.
