= Seisetsu Shucho =

Japanese Zen priest, poet, and artist

Seisetsu Shucho, also known as Daiyu Kokushi, (1745 – 28 June 1820) was a Japanese Zen priest, poet and artist, He is known for the reconstruction and consolidation of the Engaku-ji Zen Buddhist temple towards the end of the Edo era.
