= Tōkei-ji =

Temple in Kamakura, Kanagawa Prefecture, Japan

Coordinates: 35°20′6.88″N 139°32′44.27″E

Shōkozan Tōkei-ji
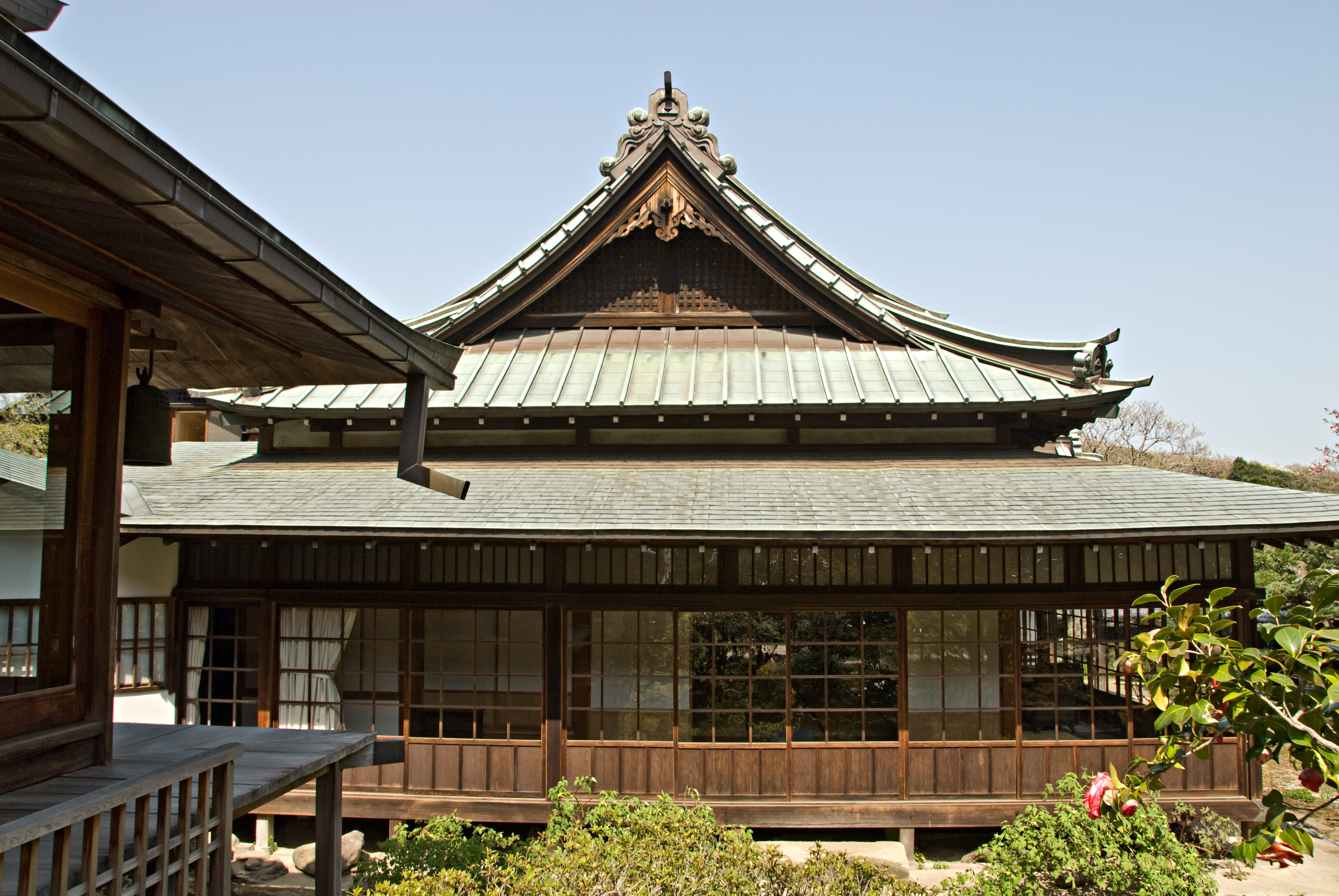
- Tōkei-ji in Kita-kamakura

Religion
- Affiliation: Rinzai, Engaku-ji school

Location
- Location: 1367 Yamanouchi, Kamakura, Kanagawa 247-0062
- Country: Japan
- Interactive map of Shōkozan Tōkei-ji

Architecture
- Founder: Hōjō Sadatoki, Kakusan-ni
- Completed: 20th century (Reconstruction)

Website
- Tokei-ji

Matsugaoka Tōkei-ji (松岡山東慶寺), also known as Kakekomi-dera (駆け込み寺) or Enkiri-dera (縁切り寺), is a Buddhist temple and a former vihāra, the only survivor of a network of five nunneries called Amagozan (尼五山) ("Nuns of the Five Mountains"), in the city of Kamakura in Kanagawa Prefecture, Japan. It is part of the Rinzai school of Zen's Engaku-ji branch, and was opened by Hōjō Sadatoki and founding abbess Kakusan-ni in 1285. It is best known as a historic refuge for women abused by their husbands. It is for this reason sometimes referred to as the "Divorce Temple".

== History ==
The temple was founded in the 8th year of Koan (1285) by nun Kakusan-ni, wife of Hōjō Tokimune (1251–1284) and mother of Sadatoki, after her husband's death. Because it was then customary for a wife to become a nun after her husband's death, she decided to open the temple and dedicate it to the memory of her husband. She also made it a refuge for battered wives.

In an age when men could easily divorce their wives but wives had great difficulty divorcing their husbands, Tōkei-ji allowed women to become officially divorced after three years of religious service, Temple records show that, during the Tokugawa period alone, an estimated 2,000 women sought shelter there. The temple lost its right to concede divorce in 1873, when a new law was approved and the Court of Justice started to handle the cases.

The temple remained a nunnery for over 600 years and men could not enter until 1902, when a man took the post of abbot and Tōkei-ji came under the supervision of Engaku-ji. Before then, the chief nun was always an important figure, and once it even was a daughter of Emperor Go-Daigo. Tenshū-ni, the daughter and only survivor of Toyotomi Hideyori's family, son of Hideyoshi, entered Tōkei-ji following the Siege of Osaka. Such was the nunnery's prestige that its couriers did not need to prostrate themselves when they met a daimyō's procession.

The two main buildings of the complex are the Main Hall and the Suigetsu-dō, but the latter is not open to visitors. The temple's old Butsuden, an Important Cultural Property, was bought during the Meiji period by businessman Tomitaro Hara and is now in the garden he built, Yokohama's Sankei-en.

In 1923, the entire temple, with the exception of the bell tower, was destroyed in the 1923 Great Kantō earthquake, and the temple was gradually rebuilt in the subsequent decade.

== Cemetery ==
Behind the temple there is a graveyard where many celebrities are buried, among them in adjacent graves are three men also famous among European Zen and haiku aficionados, Kitarō Nishida, D. T. Suzuki, Beatrice Erskine Lane Suzuki, and Reginald Horace Blyth.
