= Engaku-ji =

Zen Buddhist temple in Kanagawa prefecture, Japan

Engaku-ji 円覚寺
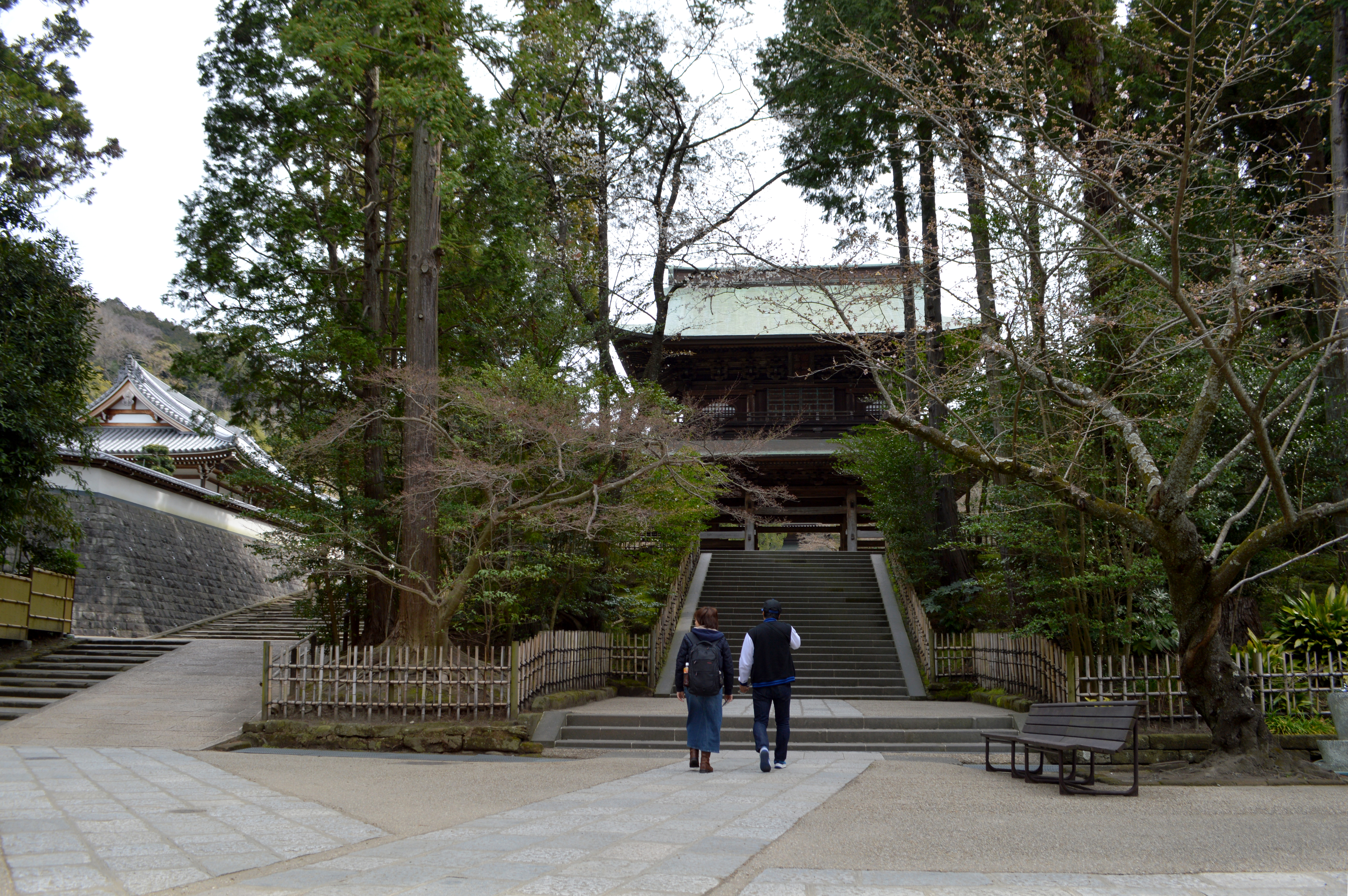
- The stairs leading to the Sanmon

Religion
- Affiliation: Engaku-ji Rinzai
- Deity: Houkan Shaka (Jewel-crown Śākyamuni)
- Status: Head Temple, Five Mountain Temple (Kamakura)

Location
- Location: 409 Yamanouchi, Kamakura, Kanagawa Prefecture
- Country: Japan
- Interactive map of Engaku-ji 円覚寺
- Coordinates: 35°20′16″N 139°32′51″E

Architecture
- Founder: Hōjō Tokimune and Mugaku Sogen
- Completed: 1964 (Reconstruction)

Website
- http://www.engakuji.or.jp/ (in Japanese)

Zuirokusan Engaku Kōshō Zenji (瑞鹿山円覚興聖禅寺), or Engaku-ji (円覚寺), is one of the most important Zen Buddhist temple complexes in Japan and is ranked second among Kamakura's Five Mountains. It is situated in the city of Kamakura, in Kanagawa Prefecture to the south of Tokyo.

Founded in 1282 (Kamakura period) by Chinese Zen monk Mugaku Sōgen, the temple maintains the classical Japanese Zen monastic design, and both the Shariden and the Great Bell (大鐘, Ogane) are designated National Treasures. Engaku-ji is one of the twenty-two historic sites included in Kamakura's proposal for inclusion in UNESCO's World Heritage Sites.

It is located in Kita-Kamakura, very close to Kita-Kamakura Station on the Yokosuka Line, and indeed the railway tracks cut across the formal entrance to the temple compound, which is by a path beside a pond which is crossed by a small bridge.

== History ==
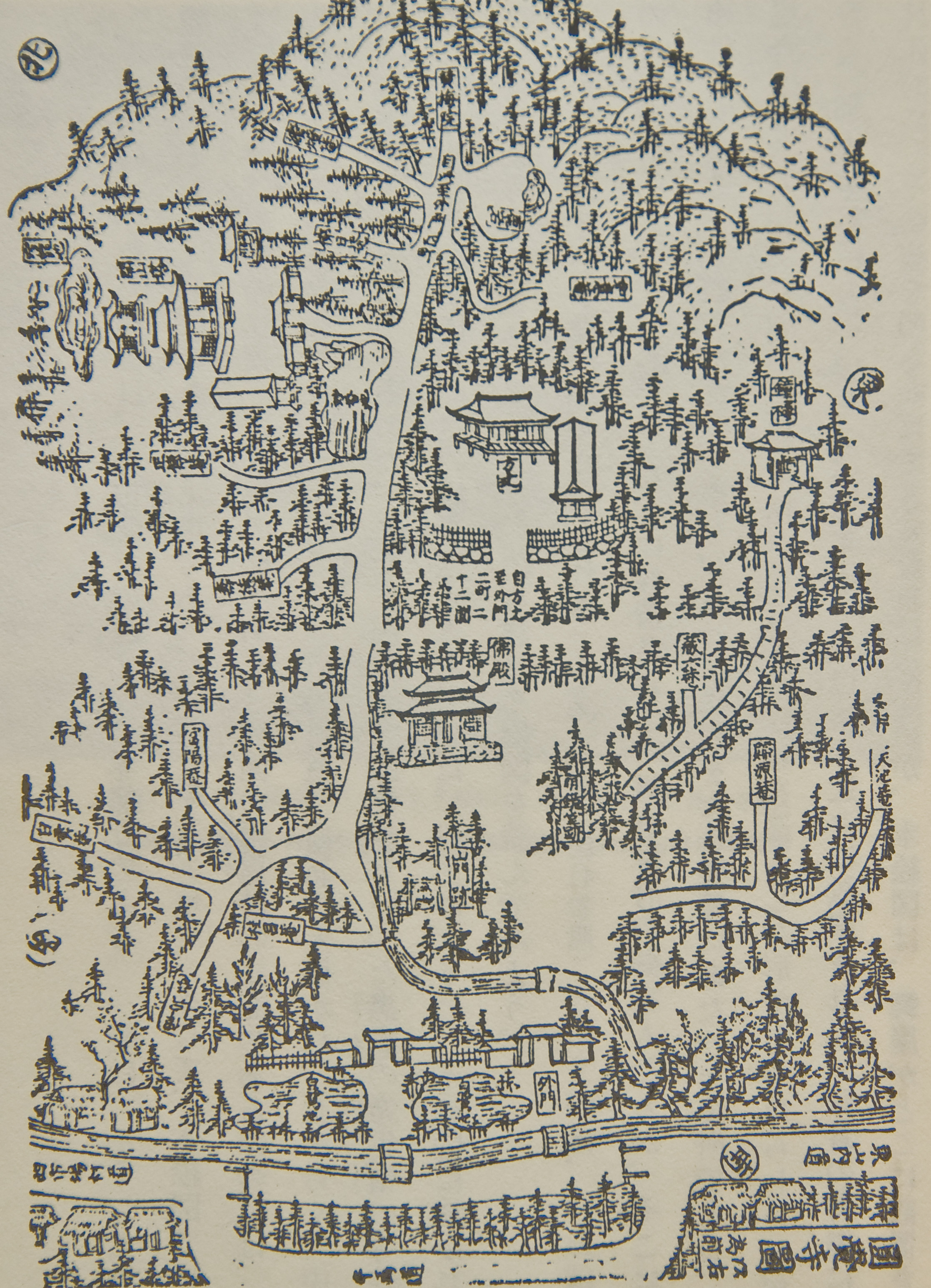
Drawing of Engaku-ji from the Shinpen Kamakurashi

The temple was founded in 1282 by a Chinese Zen monk Mugaku Sōgen (1226-1286) at the request of the then ruler of Japan, the regent Hōjō Tokimune after he had repelled a Mongolian invasion in the period 1274 to 1281. Tokimune had a long-standing commitment to Zen and the temple was intended to honour those of both sides who died in the war, as well as serving as a centre from which the influence of Zen could be spread. According to the records of the time, when building work started a copy of the Sutra of Perfect Enlightenment (in Japanese, engaku-kyō 円覚経) was dug out of the hillside in a stone chest during the initial building works, giving its name to the temple.

The fortunes of the temple have waxed and waned over the centuries. Its present form is owed to the Zen priest Seisetsu Shucho (1745–1820), also known as Daiyu Kokushi, who reconstructed and consolidated it towards the end of the Edo era. A particularly important year for these reforms and the history of the temple was 1785, the "500th Anniversary of the Foundation". In the Meiji era, Engaku-ji became the chief centre for Zen instruction in the Kantō region; Imakita Kōsen and Soyen Shaku were successively abbots in this period, and Daisetz Teitaro Suzuki was a student under them.

Zazen courses are still held in the temple, with open meditations sessions every morning (except for New Year's and early October) and every Saturday afternoon (except for August). There's also a sermon the 2nd and 4th Sunday of the month at 9:00 am, followed by a session of zazen. These activities are held at the main hall (Butsuden), Kojirin and Hojo buildings respectively. A four-day "Summer Lecture Series" is organized yearly in late July.

== Architecture ==
Fire has damaged many of the buildings at different times, and the dates given below refer to the building of the structures currently seen. From the entrance, the buildings of the temple rise up a wooded hillside, with the major buildings in a straight line in the perpendicular zen style; the austere buildings and the trees blending in a satisfying overall composition. There are altogether 18 temples on the site.

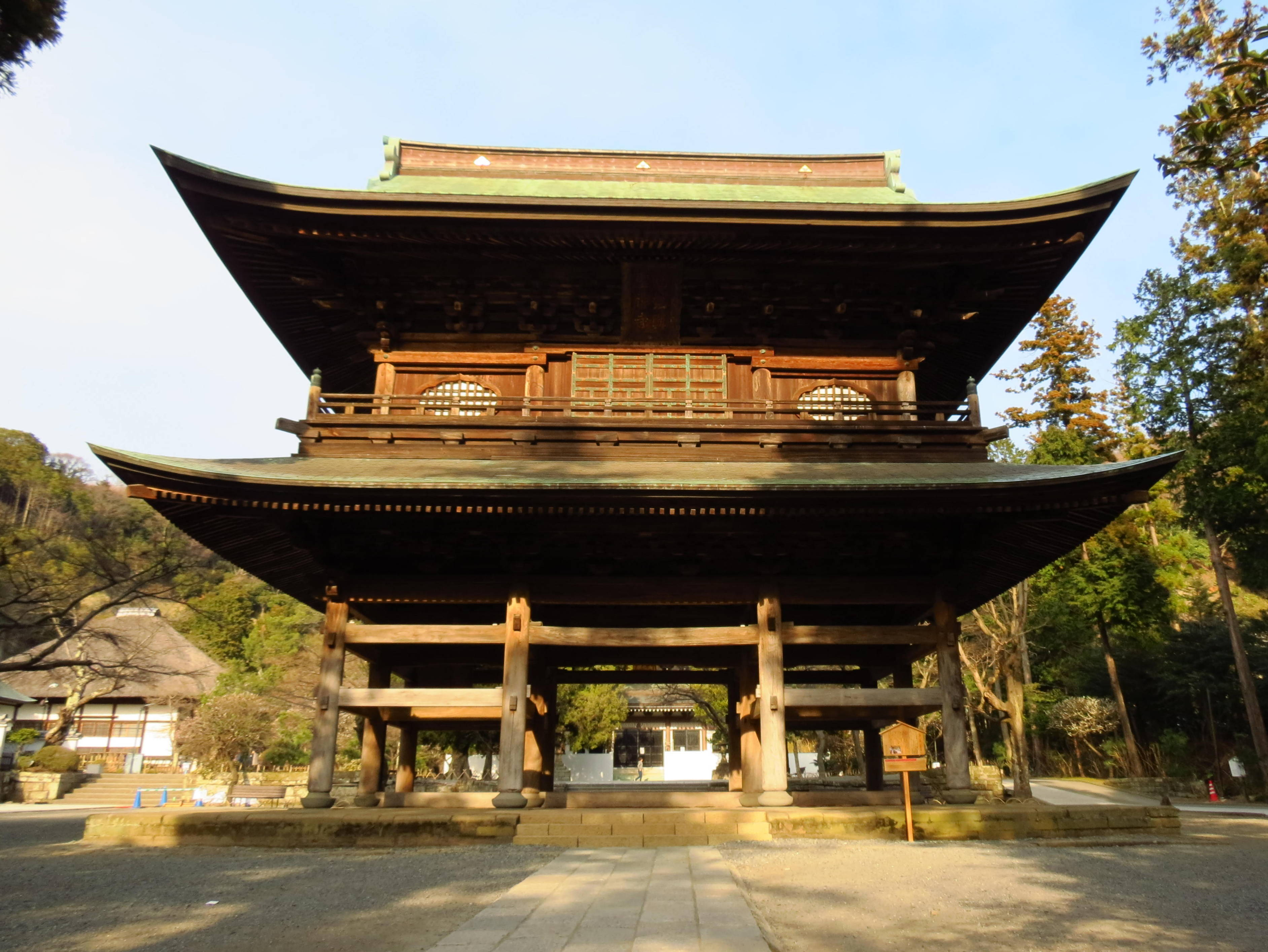
The Sanmon (main gate)

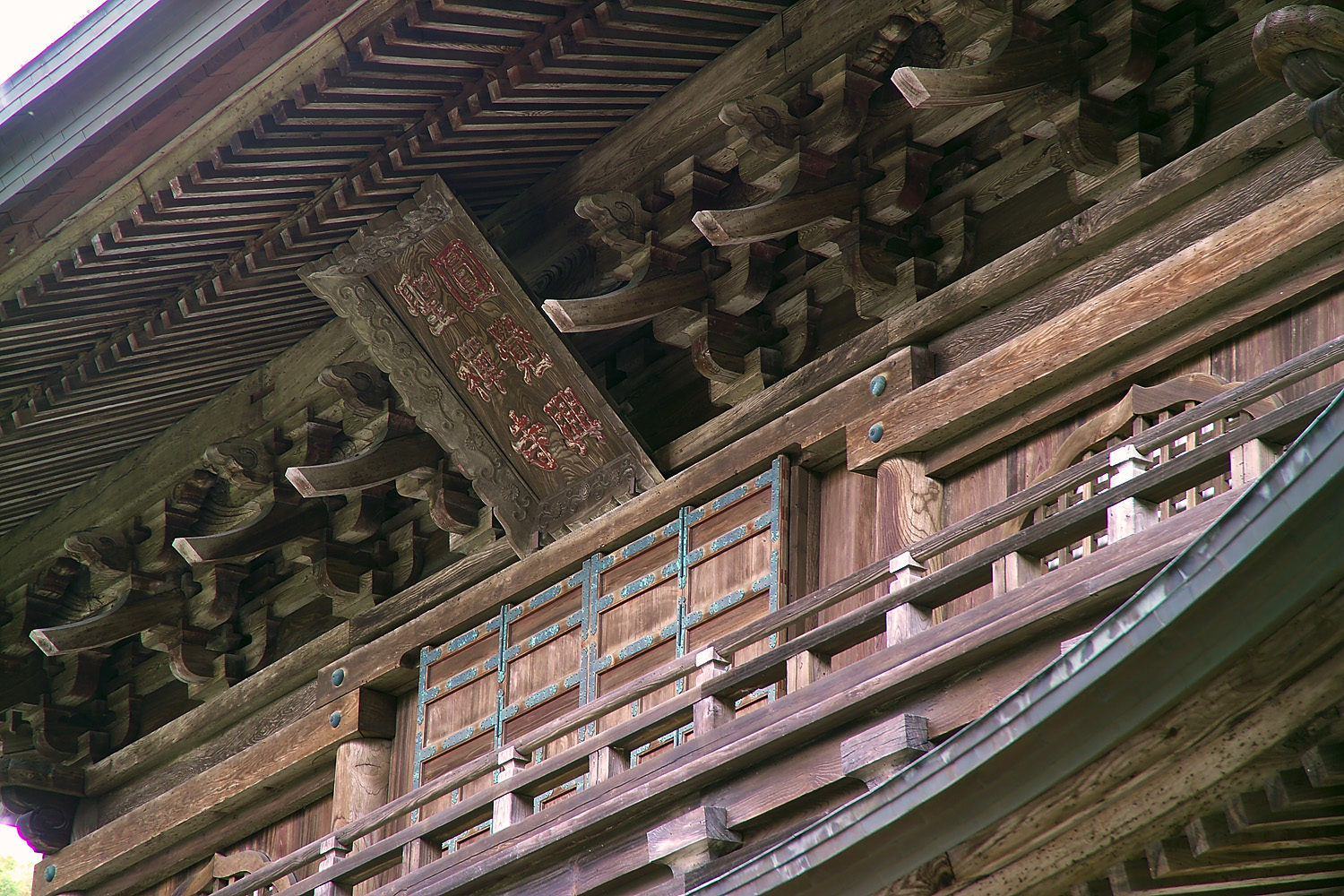
Emperor Fushimi's calligraphy on top of the Sanmon

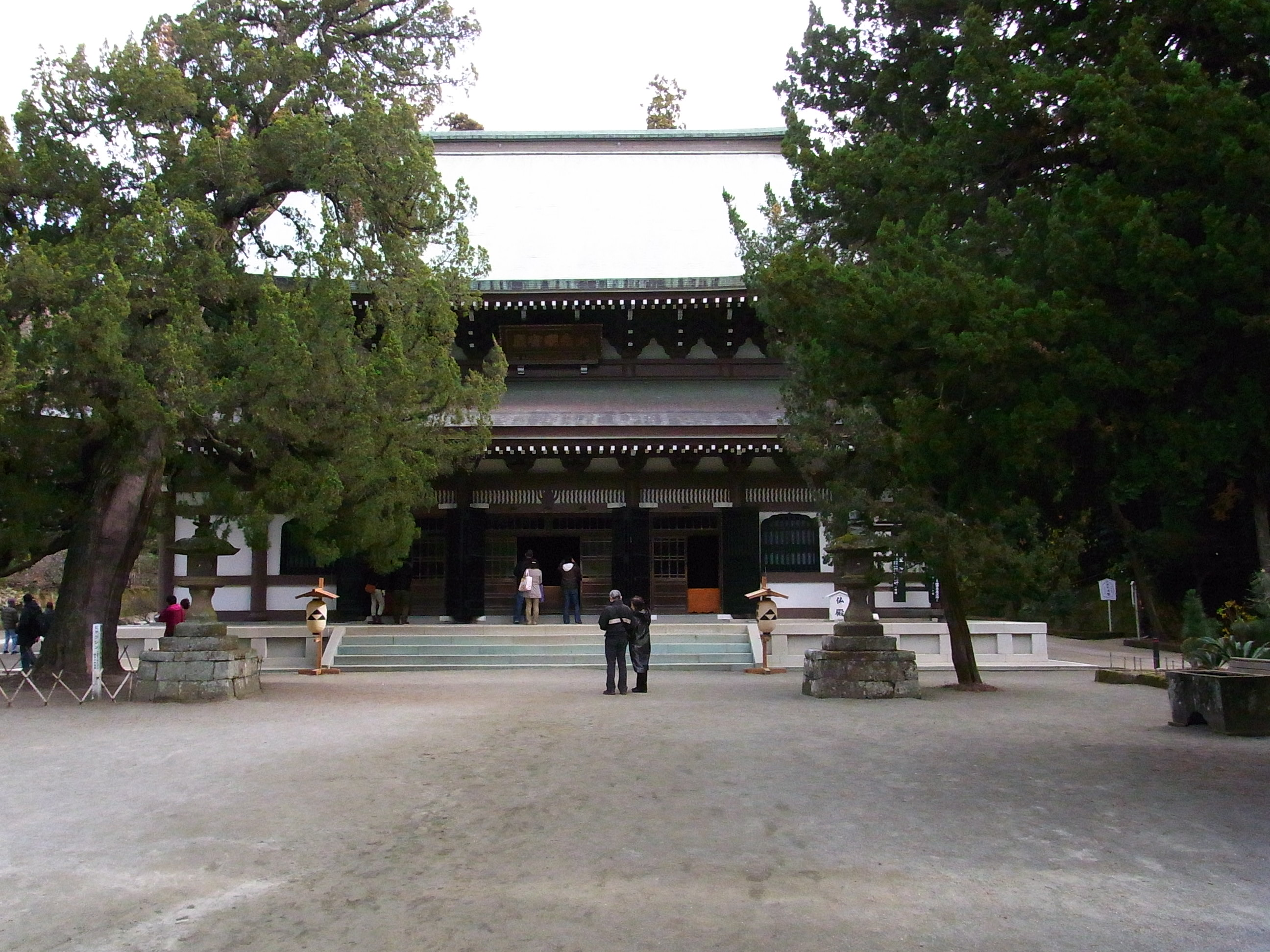
The Butsuden (main hall)

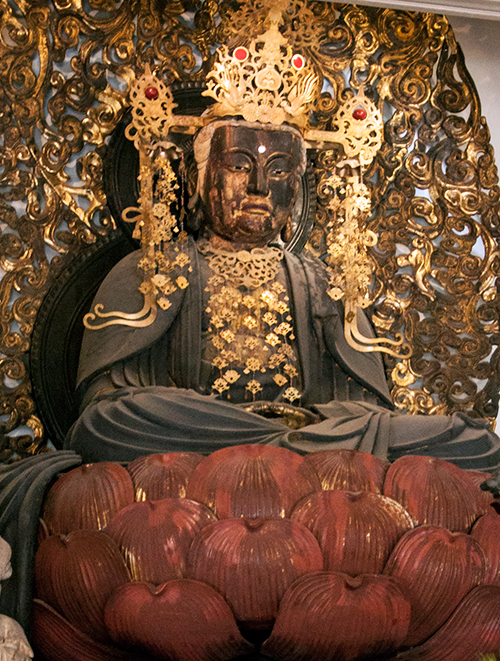
Statue of Hokan Shaka Nyorai in the Butsuden

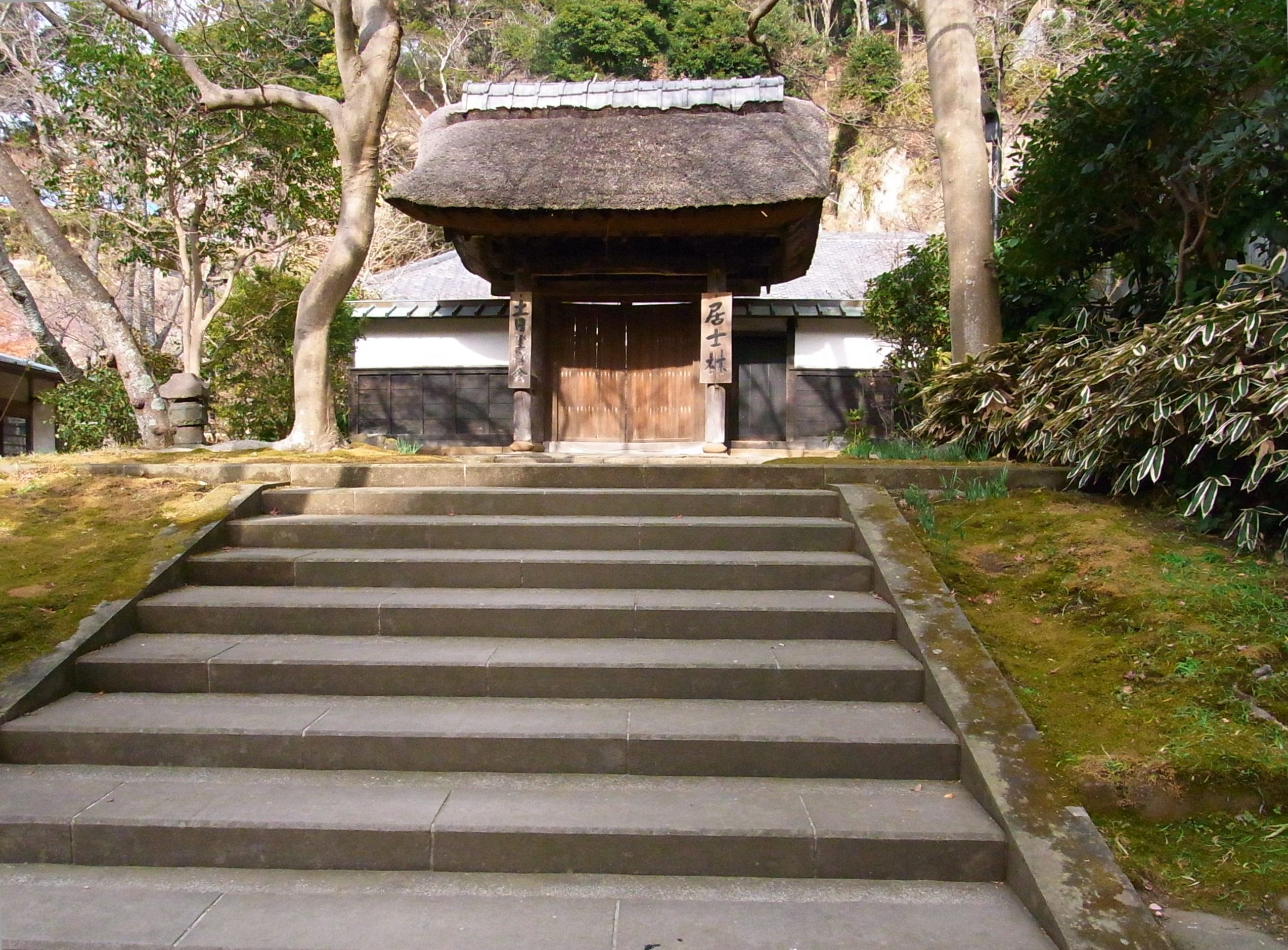
Kojirin meditation hall

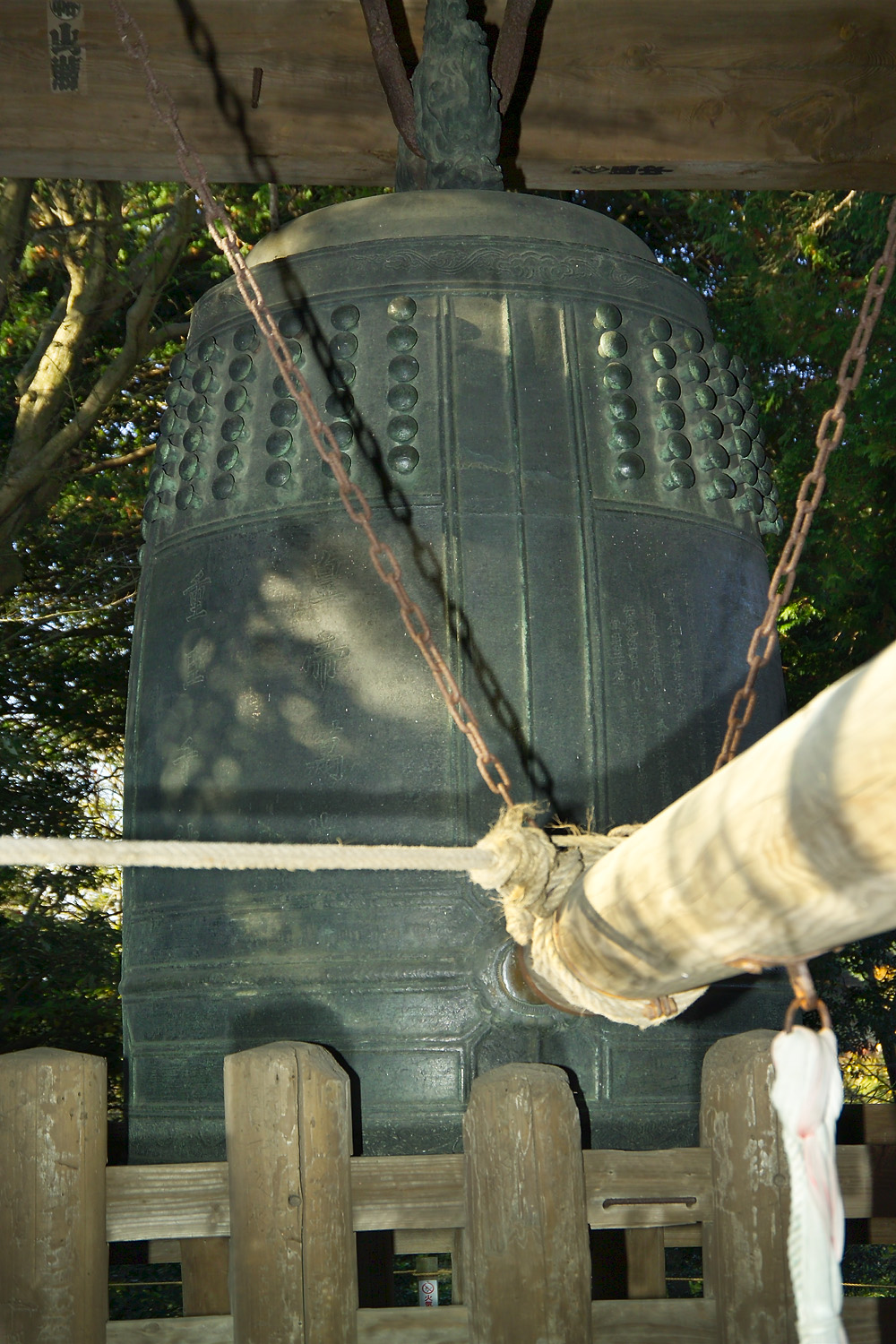
Engaku-ji's Ogane (great bell) (National Treasure)

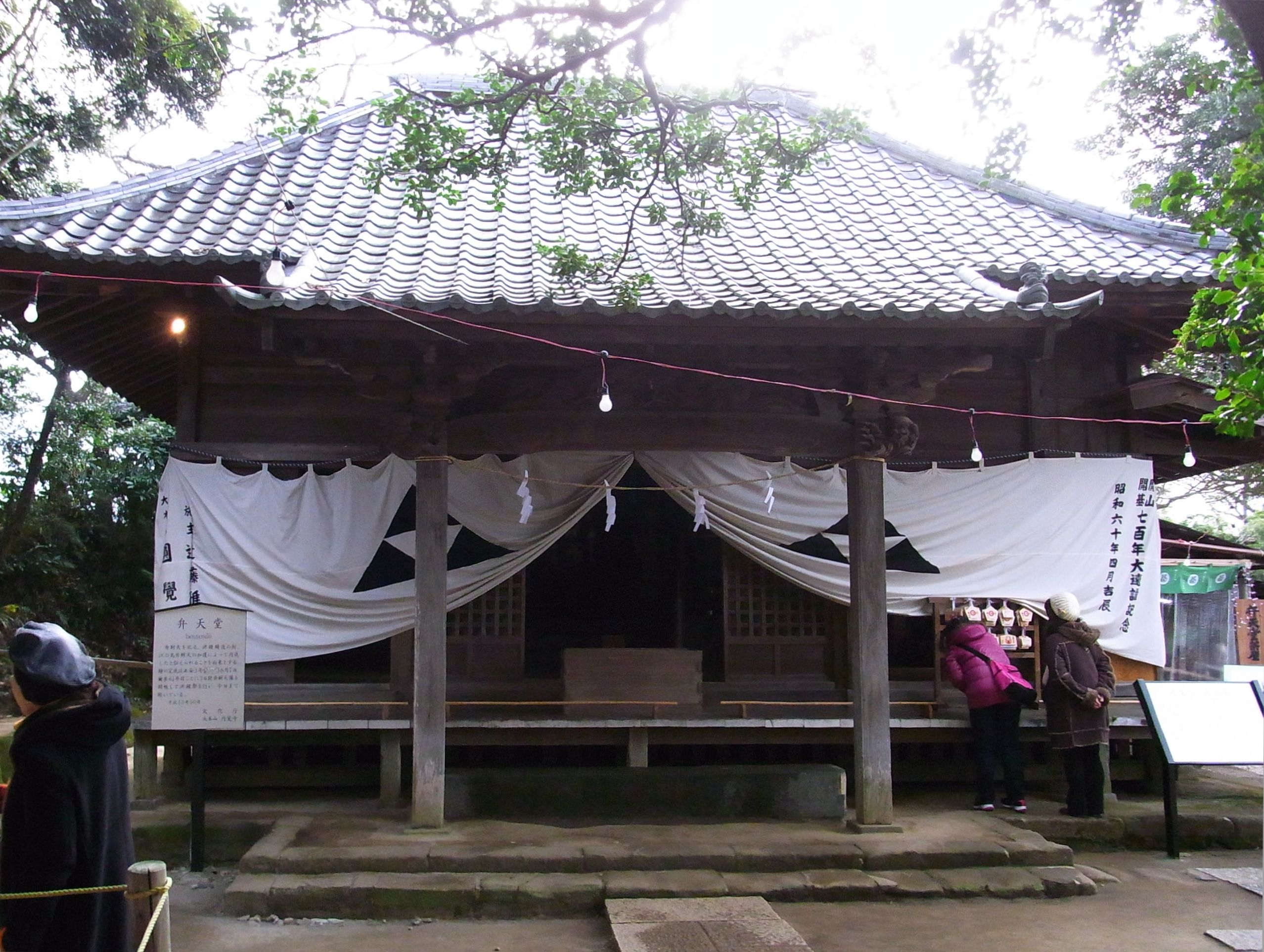
Bentendo hall

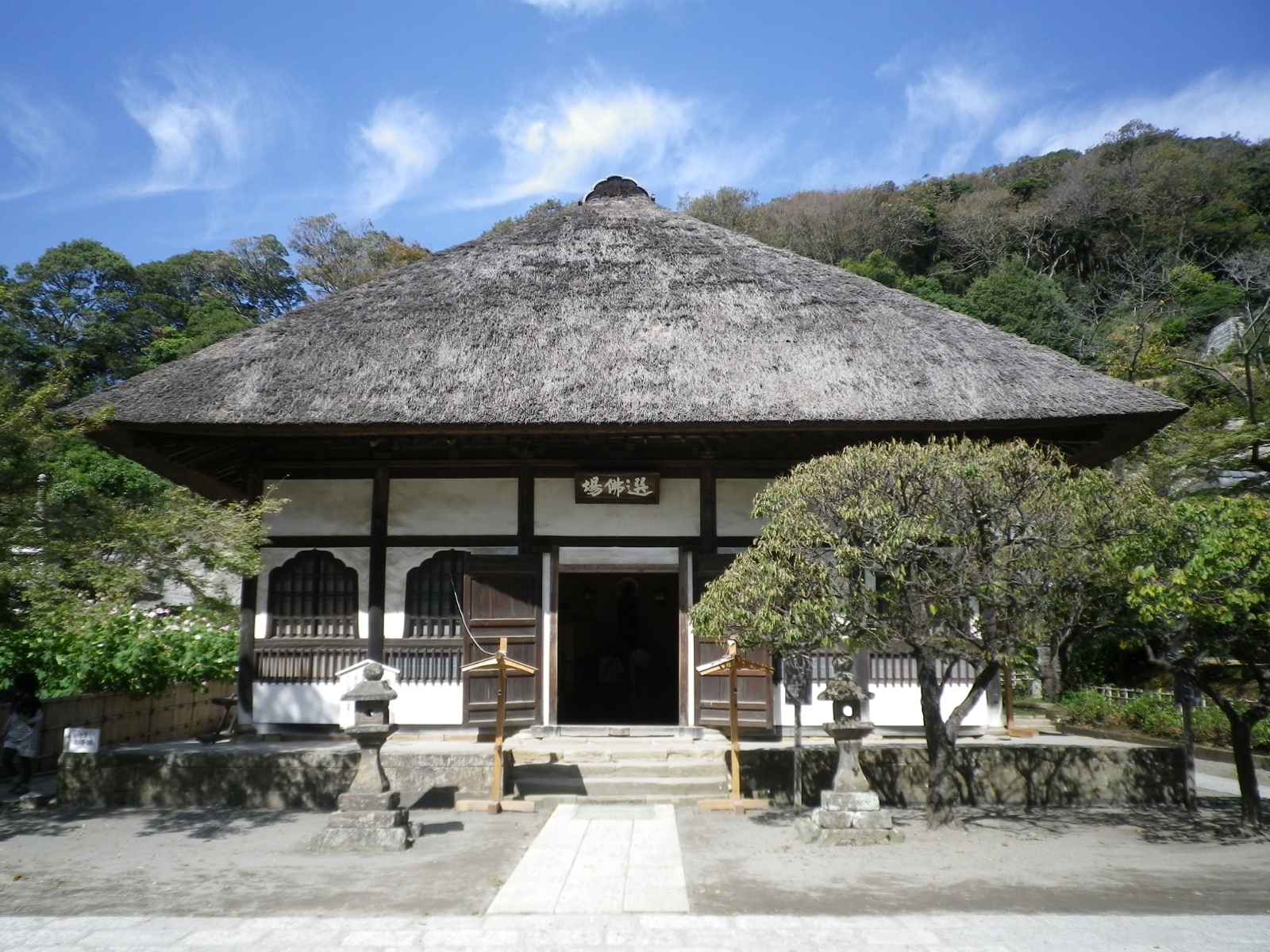
Senbutsudo

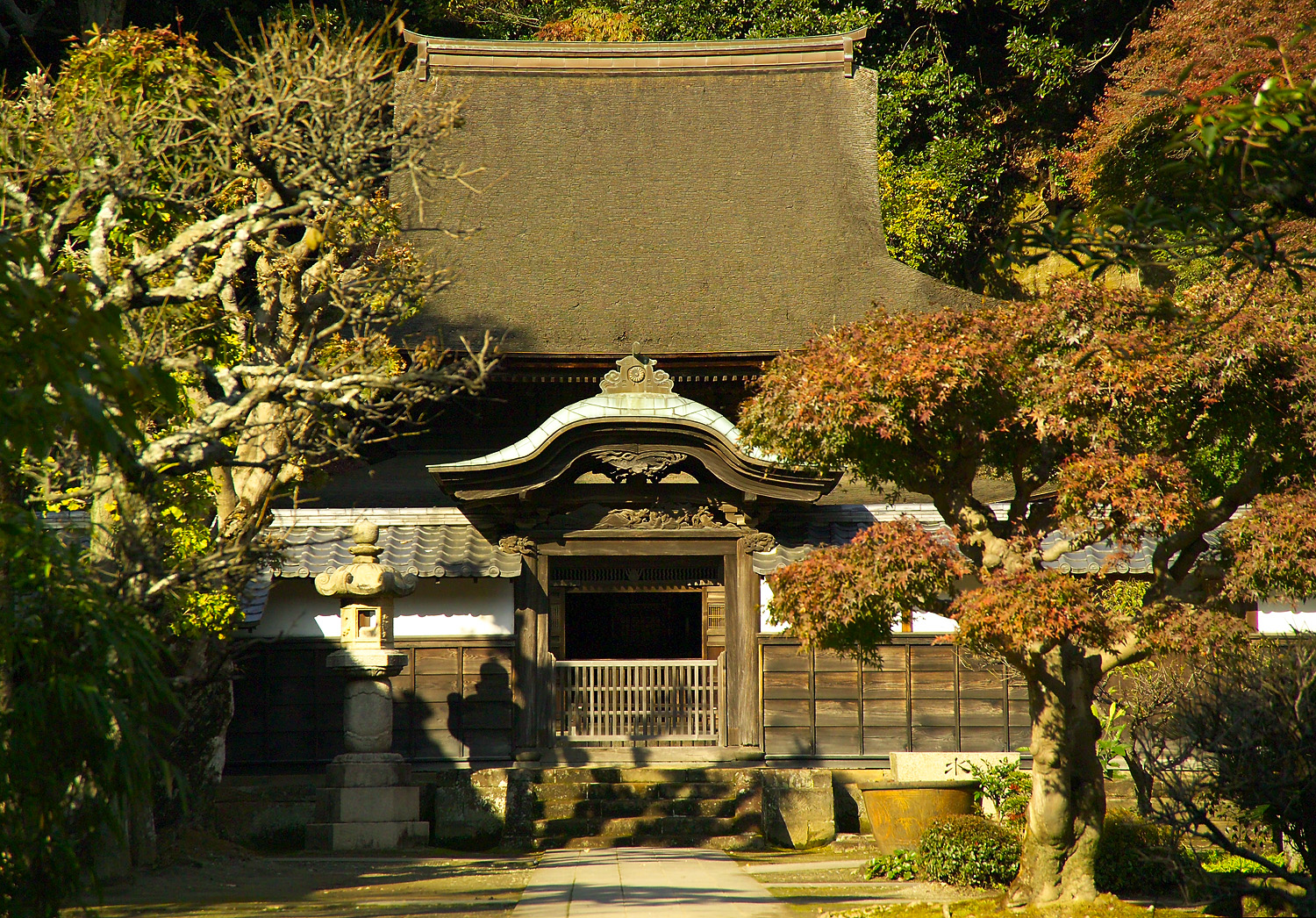
The Shariden (reliquary hall) (National Treasure)

=== Sanmon ===
The two-storied main gate, or Sanmon (山門), was rebuilt in 1785, as part of the reconstruction works led by Seisetsu. A wooden plaque of calligraphic work by the Emperor Fushimi (1265-1317) reads "Engaku Kōshō Zenji". On the upper floor there are statues enshrined of Bodhisattva, the Sixteen Arhats and the Twelve Heavenly Generals. The roof is covered with copper.

It is designated an Important Cultural Property of the Kanagawa Prefecture.

=== Butsuden ===
The large modern Butsuden (仏殿) (; main hall;) at the center of the Engaku-ji complex was rebuilt in 1964, after it was destroyed by the Great Kanto Earthquake. The construction of this new building, surrounded by junipers, was made closely following a plan from 1573.

It is dedicated to Hokan Shaka Nyorai (Shakyamuni with a Jeweled Crown), enshrined there, the main object of worship of the temple. This seated statue dates from the late Kamakura period. Statues of Bonten and Taishakuten in the same hall date from 1692. A painting of a dragon in the ceiling was painted by Tadashi Moriya under the supervision of Seison Maeda.

Above the front entrance there is a plaque of calligraphy from Emperor Go-Kogon (1338–74) which reads Daikomyohoden.

=== Sembutsudo and Kojirin ===
Sembutsudo (選仏堂) is a thatch-roofed hall for Zen meditation and a sutra repository, built in 1699.

The Kojirin (居士林) is a Zen meditation hall for lay trainees (Koji). Meditation sessions are held here most Sundays, both for first-time participants and for the general public.

Both building stand left of the Butsuden, and are open to the public.

=== Ogane (National Treasure) and Bentendo ===
Cast by Mononobe Kunimitsu in August 1301, the Great Bell (大鐘, Ogane) of Engaku-ji is at 2.6 metres tall the largest of all the many temple bells of Kamakura (in fact the largest in Kantō). It was made by order of Hojo Sadatoki (1271-1311), after he confined himself in the Benzaiten shrine in Enoshima.

This bell and the one at Kenchō-ji are the only ones designated National Treasure in that category of crafts in the Kanagawa prefecture (also the only ones from the Kamakura period).

A waniguchi gong from 1540 hangs in the belfry. It designated an Important Cultural Property.

Bentendo (弁天堂) is dedicated to the Benzaiten shrine in Enoshima. According to the legend, the cast of the Ogane successful thanks to the protection of Benzaiten. Once every 60 years a grand ceremony is held between both temples.

=== Shariden (National Treasure) ===
The Shariden (舎利殿) (reliquary hall), is a 3×3 hall, single-storied, irimoya style, with a pent roof enclosure, covered with hinoki cypress bark shingles. It is the only building with the designation of National Treasure in the Kanagawa prefecture.

The original structure, built in 1285 by Hōjō Sadatoki (1271-1311), was destroyed by a fire in 1563. The current building was transferred from the Taiheiji convent in Nishi Mikado, but it still dates from the Muromachi period.

The structure is typical of kara-yo (Chinese-style architecture), also called Zenshu-yo (Zen-sect-style), introduced from China in the Kamakura period, with a style close to that of the Song dynasty. It houses what is claimed to be a tooth of Shakyamuni, presented by the Noninji Temple in China to Minamoto no Sanetomo.

=== Other structures ===
Among the other buildings and monuments are:

- Kaikibyo
- Shozokuin
- Kojirin
- Hojo
- the thatched Butsunichian (仏日庵) which is the burial site of Hōjō Tokimune;
- Obaiin (黄梅院), a small thatched temple containing a statue of Kannon;
- grave of film director Yasujirō Ozu, marked mu (無, nothingness)

== Access and amenities ==
There is an admission fee (as of 2026, 500 yen) for visitors to enter the temple complex, and additional similar charges to enter a few of the buildings. Booths selling tourist items are located near the entrance, below the Sanmon, and there are refreshment facilities in the garden of the Shariden and at the platform where the Great Bell is located, from where there are extensive views across the valley to other temple complexes in the Kita-Kamakura neighbourhood, such as Jōchi-ji and Tōkei-ji (another temple of the Engaku-ji school).

== Annual Events ==
- Nehane (Shakyamuni's Nirvana Ceremony) February 15
- Gotane (Birthday of Shakyamuni) and Hana Matsuri (Flower Festival) April 8
- Kaisanki (Anniversary of the Founder's death) October 3
- Darumaki (Anniversary of Bodhidharma's death) October 15
- Homotsu Kazeire (Treasures Exhibition) around November 3 (three days)
- Jodoe (Anniversary of Shakyamuni's Enlightenment) December 8

== See also ==
- List of National Treasures of Japan (crafts-others)
