= Mugai Nyodai =

Japanese Zen master

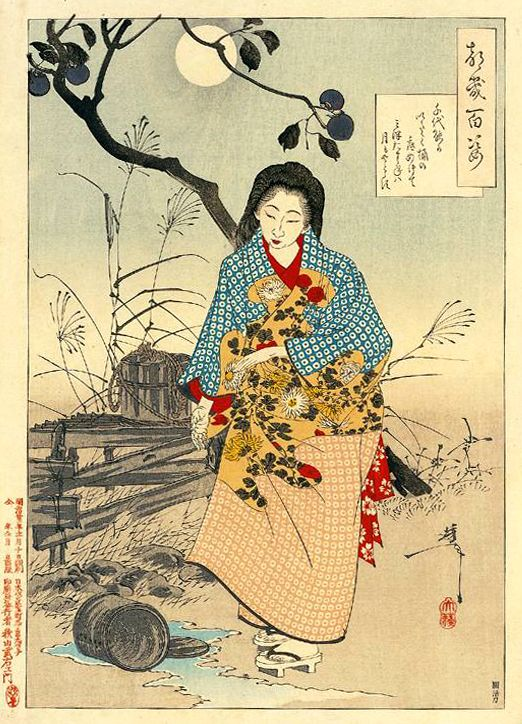
Yoshitoshi's Lady Chiyo (Nyodai) and the Broken Water Bucket

Mugai Nyodai (Japanese: 無外如大, 1223–1298) was one of the first abbesses of Zen Buddhism and the first female Zen master in Japan. A disciple of Mugaku Sogen, she organized convents and spread the lessons of the Rinzai school of Zen. The only surviving written accounts of her life date to more recent centuries, and so many details of her biography are unclear.
