= Kudō Suketaka =

Japanese feudal lord

Kudō Suketaka (工藤 祐隆) was a Japanese feudal lord who was the lord of Kusumi Manor in Izu Province and the 6th head of the Kudō clan. He founded the Itō clan and is an ancestor to the Kanō clan and the Kawazu clan. He was also known as Itō Ietsugu.

Suketaka's division of his territory between his son and his grandson would lead to a chain of revenge, the Revenge of the Soga Brothers incident being the most well-known.

== Life ==
Suketaka gave the Kudō clan's ancestral home, the Kanō Manor (upstream of the Kano River) in Izu Province, to his fourth son, Kudō Shigemitsu. Here, Shigemitsu would later establish the Kanō clan. Suketaka himself would move to the Kusumi Manor to the east from the Kanō Manor and establish the Itō clan. The Kusumi Manor was made up from four smaller manors, the Itō Manor, Usami Manor, Ōmi Manor and the Kawazu Manor, which would later become the subject of an inheritance struggle.

Suketaka was not blessed with a successor, as his heir, Itō Sukeie, had died prematurely, so he adopted a son from his second wife's previous marriage as Kudō Suketsugu to succeed him. Suketaka gave Suketsugu his main territory, the Itō Manor and the Usami Manor, and gave the Kawazu Manor to his grandson, Itō Sukechika (founder of the Kawazu clan), the son of his eldest son Sukeie, and thus decided to divide his territory.

However, Sukechika, dissatisfied with this measure, seized the territory after Suketsugu's death. Kudō Suketsune, the son of Suketsugu, shot and killed Sukechika's son Kawazu Sukeyasu, out of resentment. In response, Sukeyasu's two sons, Soga Sukenari and Tokimune took their revenge on Suketsune, known as the Revenge of the Soga Brothers, as depicted in Soga Monogatari, creating a chain of revenge.

== See also ==
- Itō clan
- Revenge of the Soga Brothers
- Soga Monogatari
