= Kudō Suketsugu =

Samurai

Kudō Suketsugu 工藤祐継
- Born: 1120
- Died: 1162 (aged 41–42)
- Occupation: samurai
- Children: Kudō Suketsune
- Father: Kudō Suketaka

Kudō Suketsugu (工藤 祐継, 1120 - 1162) was a Japanese samurai of the late Heian period. He was also known as Kudō Takiguchi Suketsugu.

== Life ==
Suketsugu was born in 1120, the son of Kudō Suketaka and his second wife. It is also said that he was Suketaka's adopted son, but this has been refuted. Although he was not expected to become the heir to his family, after his elder brother Itō Sukeie died, Suketsugu became the heir to the family and inherited the Itō Manor.

According to Azuma Kagami, when Suketsugu's son Suketsune had his coming of age ceremony (genpuku), Suketsugu promised that Suketsune would marry Mangō Gozen, the daughter of Itō Sukechika, and Sukechika would become Suketsune's guardian. However, Sukechika did not accept the fact that Suketsune, not in the lineage of the eldest son, would inherit the manor, and invaded Suketsune's territory following Suketsugu's death.

According to Soga Monogatari Manabon, Suketsugu died in 1162 at the age of 42. At the time of his death, his son Suketsune was eight years old.

== See also ==
- Revenge of the Soga Brothers
- Kawazu Sukeyasu
- Soga Monogatari
