= Soga Sukenobu =

Japanese samurai lord and gokenin

Soga Sukenobu 曾我祐信
- Born: Unknown
- Died: Unknown
- Other names: Tarō
- Occupation: samurai lord
- Children: Soga Tokimune (adoptive); Soga Sukenari (adoptive)

Soga Sukenobu (曾我 祐信) was a Japanese samurai lord and gokenin of the late Heian and early Kamakura period. He was the lord of Soga Manor in Sagami Province. He was the adoptive father of Soga Tokimune and Sukenari, known for the Revenge of the Soga Brothers incident. He was also known as Soga Tarō.

== Life ==
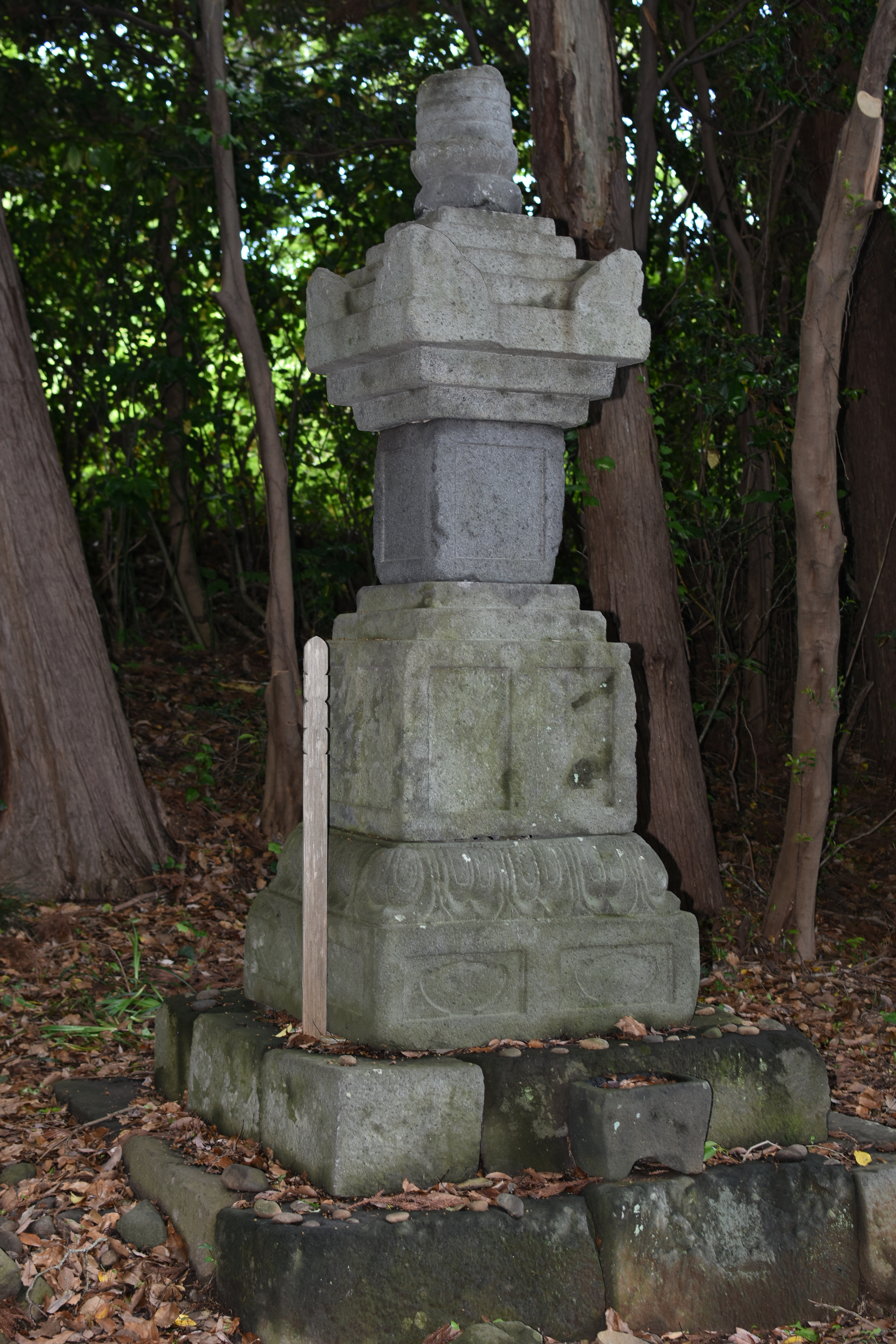
Soga Sukenobu Hōkyōintō

Soga Sukenobu was born to the Soga clan, who claimed descent from Emperor Kanmu's lineage of the Taira clan. His mother was the daughter of Itō Sukeie.

He was a resident of Soga township in Sagami Province (present-day Odawara, Kanagawa Prefecture).

In 1180, he sided with the Taira clan in the Battle of Ishibashiyama, but later surrendered to Minamoto no Yoritomo. He was rewarded a territory and became a close retainer (gokenin) to Yoritomo.

Later, Sukenobu remarried the widow of Kawazu Sukeyasu and mother of Kawazu Hako'ō and Ichimanmaru, later known as Soga Tokimune and Sukenari, respectively. The Soga brothers thus became his adoptive sons.

In 1193, he participated in the grand hunting event Fuji no Makigari arranged by Minamoto no Yoritomo. On June 28, 1193, on the last night of Fuji no Makigari, Tokimune and Sukenari killed Kudō Suketsune, the killer of their biological father, which came to be known as the Revenge of the Soga Brothers. Sukenari was killed during the incident, and Tokimune was executed the next day. Following the deaths of his adoptive sons, Sukenobu was allowed seclusion and a tax exemption on the Soga Manor to hold their memorial service.

== Genealogy ==
The founder of the Soga clan, Soga Sukeie, was an eighth generation descendant of Taira no Yoshifumi, descending from the Taira clan through the Chiba clan, making him a direct descendant of the 8th century Emperor Kanmu.

The descendants of Soga Sukenobu served as gokenin to the Kamakura shogunate and later to the Ashikaga shogunate, and was later known as an antiquarian samurai family. The clan served as a retainer to the Hōjō Tokusō and later became the acting governor (jitō-dai) of Tsugaru, Mutsu Province.

== Historic sites ==
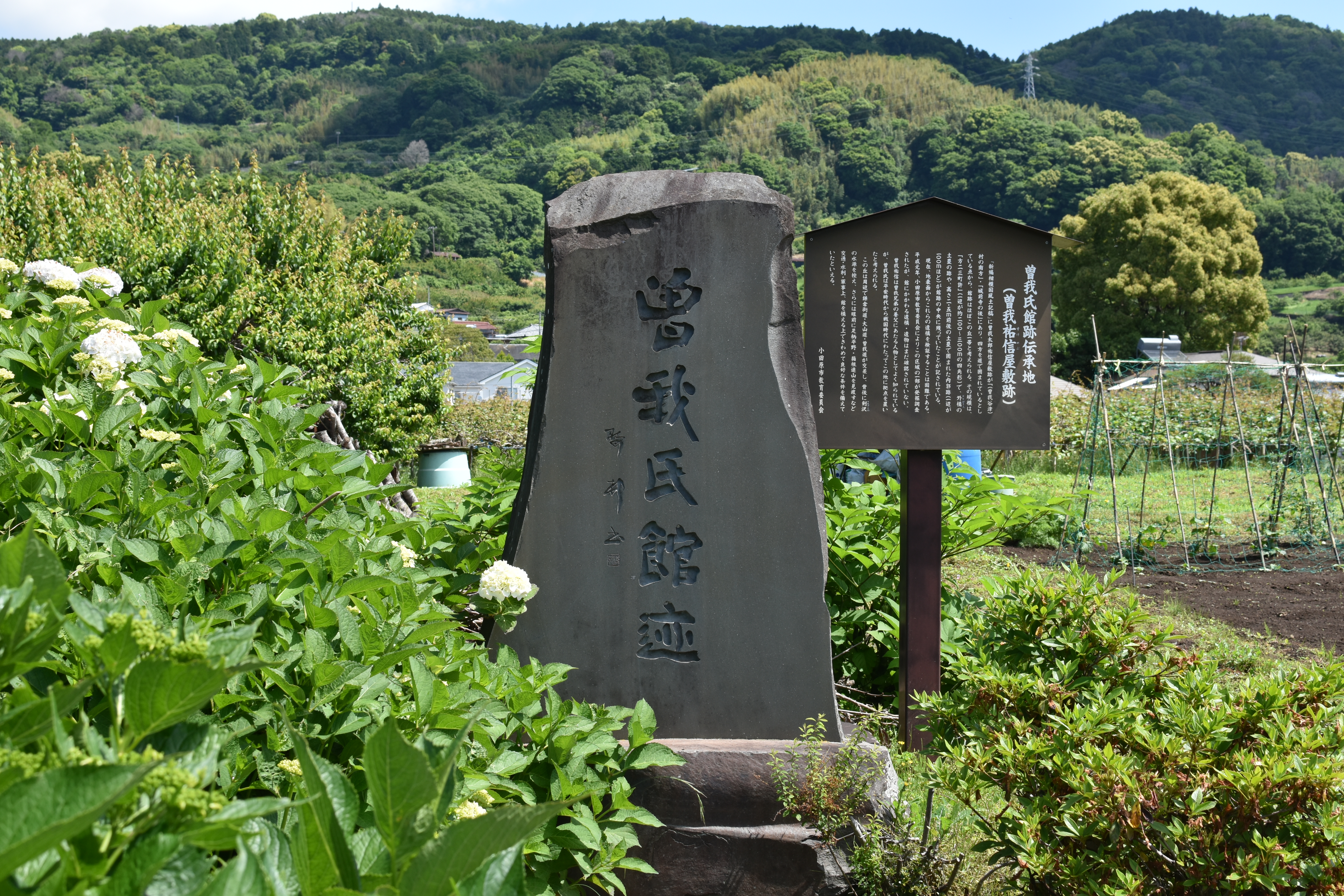
Ruins of the Soga Clan Mansion

In Soga, Odawara, Kanagawa Prefecture, there is a late Kamakura period pagoda grave dedicated to Soga Sukenobu's devotion.

In Sogayatsu, Odawara, there are the ruins of Soga Sukenobu's mansion, also known as the Soga Clan Mansion. Nearby, there is a place name called Uchibori, which means "inner moat".

== See also ==
- Fuji no Makigari
- Soga clan (Sagami Province)
