= Itō Sukeie =

Samurai

Itō Sukeie (伊東 祐家) was a Japanese samurai of the Heian period. He was the father of Itō Sukechika, and the great-grandfather of Soga Tokimune and Sukenari, known for the Revenge of the Soga Brothers incident.

== Life ==
He was born as the first son of Kudō Suketaka, the 6th head of the Kudō clan and the founder of the Itō clan. Sukeie had a son, Sukechika. Sukeie succeeded his father and took the name Itō Tarō Taifu. However, because Sukeie died at a young age, his father Suketaka made Kudō Suketsugu, a child from his wife's previous marriage, his new heir.

Although there is no mention of Itō Sukeie in Honchō buke shosei bunmyaku keizu, his name is recorded in Shoshi Honkei-chō and Hitosugi-shi keizu.

== Genealogy ==
The Itō clan, founded by Sukeie's father, claimed descent from the Fujiwara clan through Fujiwara no Korekimi (727–789) and Kudō Ietsugu, his grandfather.

After the death of Sukeie in 1181, Sukechika inherited the Kawazu Manor in Izu Province. When Sukeie's brother Suketsugu neared death, he made Sukechika the guardian of his son Suketsune, who became the head of the Itō Manor in Izu Province.

== See also ==
- Itō clan
- Revenge of the Soga Brothers
