= Yasuyoshi =

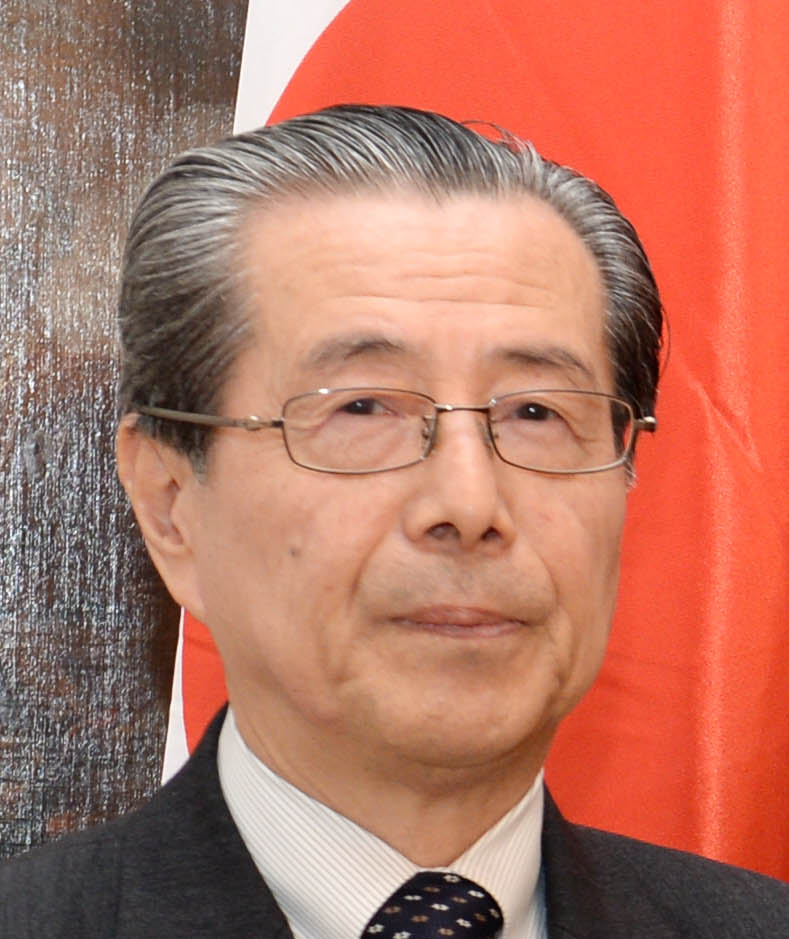
- Yasuyoshi Komizo, Japanese diplomat
- Pronunciation: jasɯjoɕi (IPA)
- Gender: Male

Origin
- Origin: Japanese
- Meaning: Different meanings depending on the kanji used

Other names
- Alternative spelling: Yasuyosi (Kunrei-shiki) Yasuyosi (Nihon-shiki) Yasuyoshi (Hepburn)

Yasuyoshi is a masculine Japanese given name.

== Written forms ==
Yasuyoshi can be written using many different combinations of kanji characters. Here are some examples:

- 靖義, "peaceful, justice"
- 靖吉, "peaceful, good luck"
- 靖良, "peaceful, good"
- 靖能, "peaceful, capacity"
- 靖芳, "peaceful, virtuous/fragrant"
- 靖善, "peaceful, virtuous"
- 康義, "healthy, justice"
- 康吉, "healthy, good luck"
- 康良, "healthy, good"
- 康能, "healthy, capacity"
- 康芳, "healthy, virtuous/fragrant"
- 康善, "healthy, virtuous"
- 安義, "tranquil, justice"
- 安吉, "tranquil, good luck"
- 保義, "preserve, justice"
- 保吉, "preserve, good luck"
- 保良, "preserve, good"
- 泰義, "peaceful, justice"
- 泰良, "peaceful, good"
- 泰能, "peaceful, capacity"
- 八洲能, "8, continent, capacity"
- 易芳, "divination, virtuous/fragrant"

The name can also be written in hiragana やすよし or katakana ヤスヨシ.

== Notable people with the name ==
- Yasuyoshi Hara (原 康義; born 1952), Japanese actor and voice actor
- Yasuyoshi Komizo (小溝 泰義, born 1948), Japanese diplomat
- Yasuyoshi Shirasawa (白沢 保美; 1868–1947), Japanese botanist
