= Soga clan (Sagami Province) =

Soga 曾我
- Mon: Mitsudomoe-ni-Kumo
- Home province: Sagami Province
- Parent house: Chiba clan
- Founder: Soga Sukeie
- Founding year: 12th century
- Cadet branches: Tsugaru-Soga clan

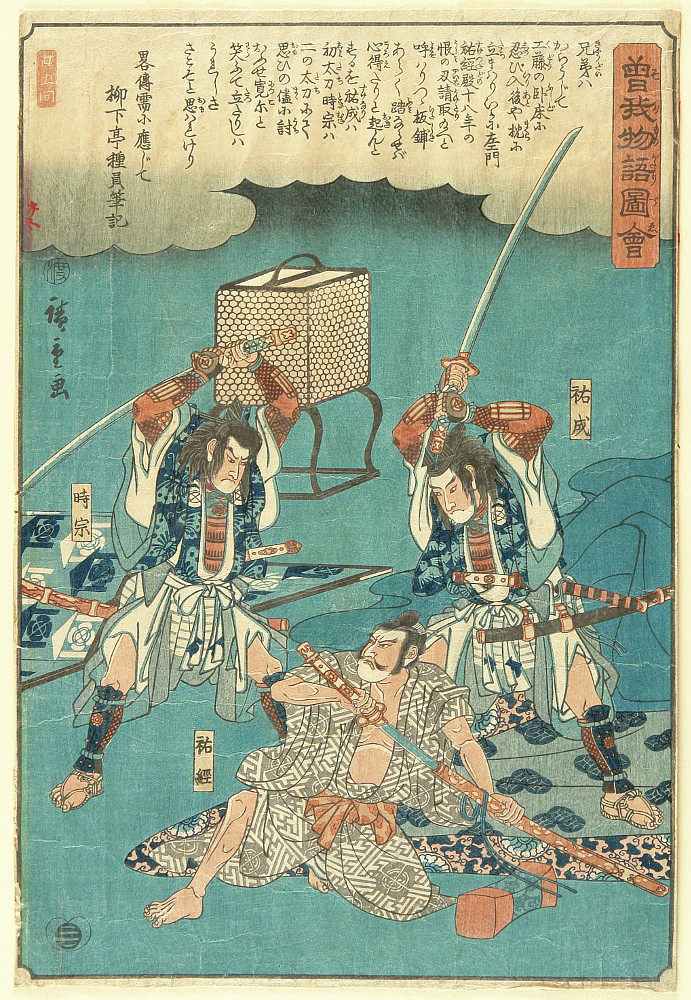
Soga brothers killing Kudō Suketsune by Utagawa Hiroshige

The Soga clan (Japanese: 曾我氏, Soga-shi) was a samurai family from Sagami Province descending from the Taira clan. Best known for the Soga brothers and their participation in the Revenge of the Soga Brothers incident of the early Kamakura period, they later became high-ranking military officials under the Ashikaga Shogunate during the Muromachi period. During the Edo period, they continued their military service and served the Tokugawa Shogunate. The clan is not related to the Soga clan (蘇我氏) of the Yamato period.

== Origins ==
The Soga clan's origins are in the Soga Manor in Sagami Province (in present-day Odawara, Kanagawa Prefecture). They descended from the Kanmu Heishi line of the Taira clan through the Chiba clan, and ultimately from the 8th century Emperor Kanmu. The founder of the Soga clan, Soga Sukeie, was an eighth generation descendant of Taira no Yoshifumi, the son of Prince Takamochi.

== History ==
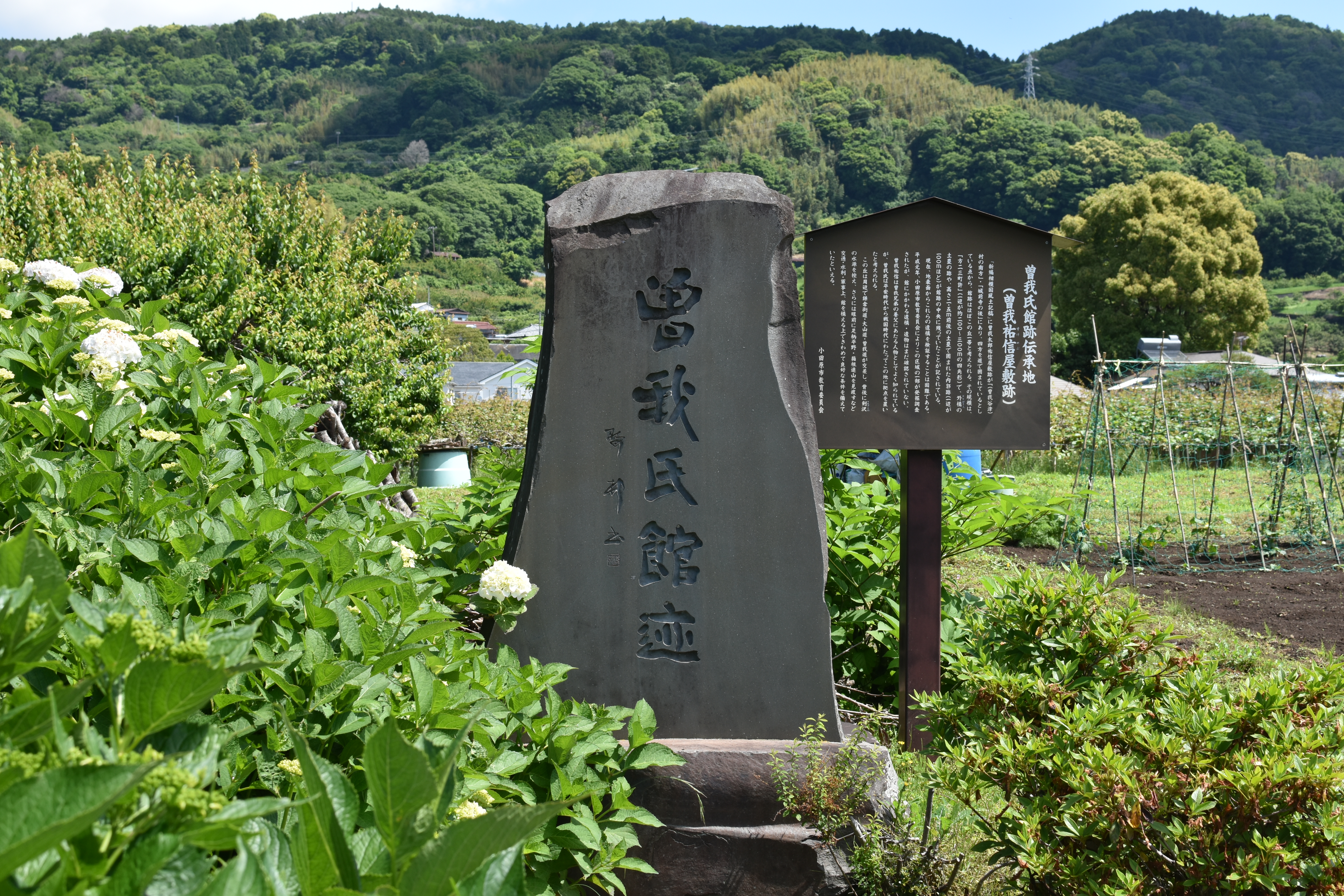
Ruins of the Soga Clan Mansion in Sogayatsu, Odawara, Kanagawa Prefecture

Although the clan claims descent from the Chiba clan, considering that the descendants inherited the territory in Izu Province, the clan was more closely related to the Itō clan than the Chiba clan, which was based in Shimosa Province.

The wife of Soga Sukeie's son Sukenobu was the mother of the Soga brothers, Soga Sukenari and Tokimune. The Soga brothers are known for their revenge incident known as the Revenge of the Soga Brothers against Kudō Suketsune, the killer of their biological father. Although the biological father of the Soga brothers was Kawazu Sukeyasu of the Itō clan, the brothers took the family name Soga after their mother remarried to Soga Sukenobu following Kawazu Sukeyasu's death, thus making Sukenobu the stepfather of the brothers.

The Revenge of the Soga Brothers incident occurred on June 28, 1193 during the grand hunting event Fuji no Makigari held by shogun Minamoto no Yoritomo. The Soga brothers took their revenge and killed Kudō Suketsune on the last night of Fuji no Makigari. The brothers began a bloodbath at the event, defeating ten samurai and slashing many others, during which Sukenari was killed by Nitta Tadatsune. After this, Tokimune set off to find the shogun and stormed into the shogun's mansion. However, Gosho no Gorōmaru took Tokimune down before he could attack Yoritomo. Tokimune was questioned and executed the next day for the crimes. This incident is recorded in the historical chronicle Azuma Kagami and the chronicle-tale Soga Monogatari, and its legacy lives on in the Sogamono plays in kabuki, noh, jōruri and kōwakamai theaters.

During the Muromachi period, several members of the Soga clan, descending from the Kanmu Heishi lineage, served the Ashikaga Shogunate as high-ranking military officials, particularly as the shogunal guards (hōkōshū). Soga Shōjirō served as the first shogunal guard (ichibanshū) during the Bun'an era. In 1563, Soga Harusuke served as Associate Governor (suke kokushi) of Kōzuke Province and Soga Saemon-no-jō (third officer of the Left Division of Outer Palace Guards) served as an infantry officer (ashigarushū).

In the Edo period, this line of military officers of the Soga clan continued their military service under the Tokugawa Shogunate.

== Notable clan members ==
- Soga Sukeie, founder of the clan
- Soga Tokimune
- Soga Sukenari

== See also ==
- Revenge of the Soga Brothers
- Itō clan
- Chiba clan
