= Shimokōbe Yukihira =

Japanese samurai

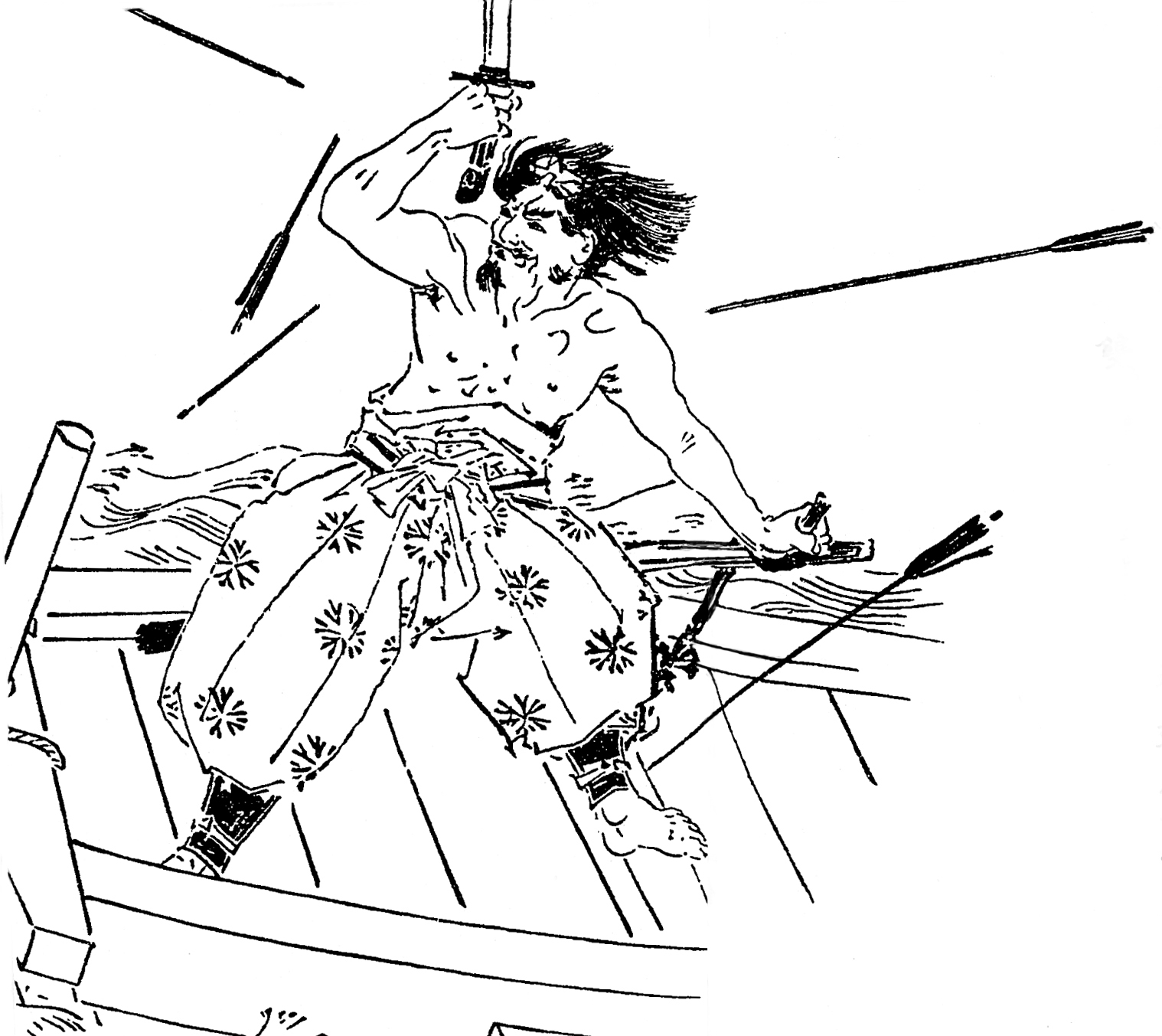
- Shimokōbe Yukihira
- Born: unknown, probably twelfth century
- Died: unknown, but no earlier than 1195
- Relatives: Fujiwara no Hidesato (remote ancestor), Shimokōbe Yukiyoshi (father), Shimokōbe Masayoshi (brother)
- Military career
- Allegiance: Minamoto clan, later Kamakura shogunate
- Conflicts: Genpei War (Shida Yoshihiro Incident) and Ōshū War

Shimokōbe Yukihira (下河辺行平; dates unknown) was a Japanese samurai of the late Heian and early Kamakura periods. He was one of the closest retainers of Minamoto no Yoritomo, the first Kamakura shōgun, and was a personal tutor to the second, Minamoto no Yoriie.

== Life ==
The birth date of Shimokōbe Yukihira, a samurai of the late Heian and early Kamakura periods, is unknown. He was the administrator (ja) Shimokōbe Manor in Katsushika District, Shimōsa Province (modern Ibaraki Prefecture, specifically the area corresponding to Koga City and its environs) and was the son of Shimokōbe Yukiyoshi and the elder brother of Shimokōbe Masayoshi. His clan were descendants of Fujiwara no Hidesato.

He was initially a vassal of the Taira clan, but when Prince Mochihito and Minamoto no Yorimasa had their call to arms, it was Yukihira who brought the word to his lord Minamoto no Yoritomo, and he joined Yoritomo when he called his banners. It was during Yoritomo's retreat to Awa Province following the Battle of Ishibashiyama that Yukihira added his forces to Yoritomo's. He was a trusted retainer of Yoritomo, and in Yōwa 1 (1181) was selected as one of his personal bodyguards (寝所近辺祗候衆). He was a prominent gokenin.

He fought valiantly in the Jishō-Juei War, including the defeat of Shida Yoshihiro (ja), and the invasion of Ōshū. He reputedly had tremendous martial skill, particularly with the bow, demonstrating his skill frequently in yabusame, yumi-hajime (弓始) and deer-hunting. He later taught archery to Minamoto no Yoriie.

In Kenkyū 6 (1195) he was accepted as a member of Yoritomo's household (ja), but his activities in the Hatakeyama Shigetada incident (ja) and later are uncertain. The date of his death is unknown.
