= Yasuyoshi Hara =

Japanese actor and voice actor

- 原 康義
- Born: April 13, 1952 (age 74); Tokyo, Japan
- Occupations: Actor, voice actor
- Years active: 1975–present

Yasuyoshi Hara (原 康義, Hara Yasuyoshi; born April 13, 1952) is a Japanese actor and voice actor attached to the Bungaku Company.

== Biography ==
Hara was born April 13, 1952, in Tokyo.

== Filmography ==
=== Television drama ===
- Ai Yori Aoku (1972) (Shūtarō Murakami)
- Kusa Moeru (1979) (Soga Tokimune)
- Special Rescue Exceedraft (1992) (Tadao Jinno)
- Atsuhime (2008) (Camera operator)

=== Film ===
- Portrait of Brothers (2019)
- Leaving the Scene (2019)

=== Television animation ===
- Monster (2004) (Doctor Becker)
- Golgo 13 (????) (Jimmy)
- Rurōni Kenshin: Meiji Kenkaku Romantan (????) (Anji Yūkyūzan)

=== Video games ===
- Age of Empires III (????) (The Infante Henrique)

=== Dubbing roles ===
==== Live action ====
- Billy Bob Thornton
  - Bandits (Terry Collins)
  - The Man Who Wasn't There (Ed Crane)
  - Intolerable Cruelty (Howard D. Doyle)
  - Bad News Bears (Morris Buttermaker)
  - Eagle Eye (Tom Morgan)
  - Faster (Detective Slade Humphries)
  - Whiskey Tango Foxtrot (Brigadier General Hollanek)
  - The Gray Man (Donald Fitzroy)
- Dennis Quaid
  - The Day After Tomorrow (Professor Jack Hall)
  - In Good Company (Dan Foreman)
  - Vantage Point (Agent Thomas Barnes)
  - G.I. Joe: The Rise of Cobra (General Hawk)
  - Truth (Colonel Roger Charles)
- Kurt Russell
  - Unlawful Entry (1997 TV Asahi edition) (Michael Carr)
  - Executive Decision (1999 TV Asahi edition) (Dr. David Grant)
  - Breakdown (1999 NTV edition) (Jeff Taylor)
  - Miracle (Herb Brooks)
- Ralph Fiennes
  - Skyfall (Gareth Mallory / M)
  - Spectre (Gareth Mallory / M)
  - No Time to Die (Gareth Mallory / M)
  - Conclave (Cardinal Thomas Lawrence)
- Kevin Costner
  - Thirteen Days (Kenneth O'Donnell)
  - Yellowstone (John Dutton)
  - Let Him Go (George Blackledge)
- Mark Rylance
  - Dunkirk (Mr. Dawson)
  - Don't Look Up (Peter Isherwell)
  - The Outfit (Leonard Burling)
- The 4400 (Tom Baldwin (Joel Gretsch))
- Amélie (Hipolito (Artus de Penguern))
- Asteroid (Jack Wallach (Michael Biehn))
- Before Night Falls (Reinaldo Arenas (Javier Bardem))
- Beverly Hills Cop III (Detective Billy Rosewood (Judge Reinhold))
- Big Game (Vice President of the United States (Victor Garber))
- Blue Thunder (2004 DVD edition) (Francis McNeil "Frank" Murphy (Roy Scheider))
- Bunraku (The Bartender (Woody Harrelson))
- Can You Ever Forgive Me? (Jack Hock (Richard E. Grant))
- Criminal Minds: Suspect Behavior (Jonathan "Prophet" Sims (Michael Kelly))
- The Da Vinci Code (Bishop Manuel Aringarosa (Alfred Molina))
- Dark Blue World (František "Franta" Sláma (Ondřej Vetchý))
- Demon Knight (The Collector (Billy Zane))
- El tiempo entre costuras (Juan Luis Beigbeder (Tristán Ulloa))
- Feud (Jack L. Warner (Stanley Tucci))
- Freaky Friday (Ryan (Mark Harmon))
- Freakier Friday (Ryan (Mark Harmon))
- From the Earth to the Moon (Wally Schirra (Mark Harmon))
- The General's Daughter (Colonel Bob Moore (James Woods))
- Godzilla (Joe Brody (Bryan Cranston))
- Gone with the Wind (1998 DVD edition) (Ashley Wilkes (Leslie Howard))
- Greta (Chris McCullen (Colm Feore))
- Home Alone 3 (Petr Beaupre (Aleksander Krupa))
- Home Alone 4: Taking Back the House (Peter McCallister (Jason Beghe))
- Idlewild (Percival Jenkins (André 3000))
- Inside Men (Lee Kang-hee (Baek Yoon-sik))
- The Legend (Gogugyang of Goguryeo (Dokgo Young-jae))
- The Legend of Zorro (Jacob McGivens (Nick Chinlund))
- Life Is Beautiful (Guido Orefice (Roberto Benigni))
- Love Actually (Daniel (Liam Neeson))
- The Lover (The Chinaman (Tony Leung Chiu-wai))
- MacGyver (Murdock (Michael Des Barres))
- The Mothman Prophecies (John Klein (Richard Gere))
- The Mountain Between Us (Mark Robertson (Dermot Mulroney))
- Mulan (Hua Zhou (Tzi Ma))
- Nomadland (Dave (David Strathairn))
- Oppenheimer (Niels Bohr (Kenneth Branagh))
- Patch Adams (Doctor Hunter "Patch" Adams (Robin Williams))
- The Pelican Brief (Gray Grantham (Denzel Washington))
- Pixels (Tōru Iwatani (Denis Akiyama))
- Poltergeist (1996 TV Asahi edition) (Steve Freeling (Craig T. Nelson))
- Remember the Titans (Bill Yoast (Will Patton))
- Resident Evil: Extinction (2010 TV Asahi edition) (Chase (Linden Ashby))
- Retribution (Anders Muller (Matthew Modine))
- Roswell (Daniel Pierce (David Conrad))
- Self/less (Old Damian Hale (Ben Kingsley))
- Sherlock (D.I. Lestrade (Rupert Graves))
- Simon Birch (Reverend Russell (David Strathairn))
- Spy Game (2005 TV Tokyo edition) (Charles Harker (Stephen Dillane))
- Those Who Kill (Leif Halborg (Henrik Prip))
- Three Christs (Dr. Alan Stone (Richard Gere))
- Transformers (Tom Banachek (Michael O'Neill))
- Transformers: Revenge of the Fallen (General Morshower (Glenn Morshower))
- Transformers: Dark of the Moon (General Morshower (Glenn Morshower))
- Twin Peaks (1990–91) (Agent Dale Cooper (Kyle MacLachlan))
- Twin Peaks: Fire Walk with Me (Agent Dale Cooper (Kyle MacLachlan))
- Twin Peaks (2017) (Agent Dale Cooper (Kyle MacLachlan))
- Twister (Dr. Jonas Miller (Cary Elwes))
- U-571 (2003 TV Asahi edition) (Lieutenant Hirsch (Jake Weber))
- The Village (Edward Walker (William Hurt))
- Virtuosity (Lt. Parker Barnes (Denzel Washington))
- A Walk on the Moon (Marty Kantrowitz (Liev Schreiber))
- Wanted (Cross (Thomas Kretschmann))
- War (Chang (John Lone))
- While You Were Sleeping (Peter Callaghan (Peter Gallagher))
- X2 (President McKenna (Cotter Smith))
- The Young Pope (Cardinal Angelo Voiello (Silvio Orlando))

==== Animation ====
- Batman: The Animated Series (Kaiser)
- Curious George (The Man with the Yellow Hat)
