= Itō Sukechika =

Japanese samurai (died 1182)

Itō Sukechika 伊東祐親
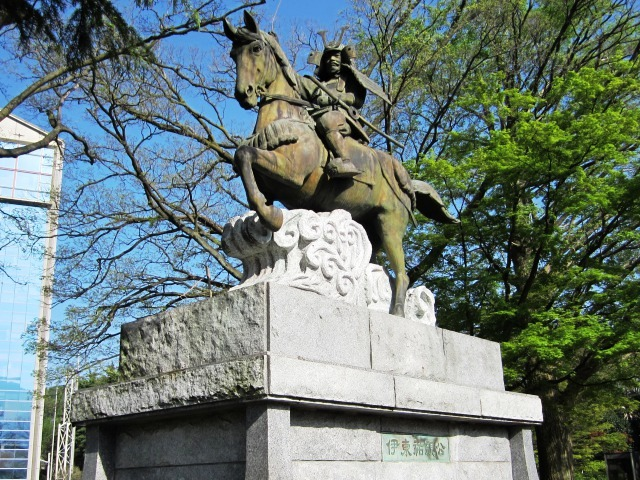
- Statue of Itō Sukechika in Monomizuka Park, Itō, Shizuoka Prefecture
- Born: Unknown
- Died: March 20, 1182
- Other names: Kawazu Sukechika, Jirō
- Occupation: samurai lord
- Children: Kawazu Sukeyasu; Kawazu Sukekiyo; Mangō Gozen; Miura Yoshizumi's wife Yaehime
- Father: Itō Sukeie

Itō Sukechika (伊東 祐親, died March 20, 1182) was a Japanese samurai lord and gōzoku of the Izu Province in the late Heian period. He was the 6th head of the Kudō clan and the founder of the Kawazu clan. He is also known as Kawazu Sukechika.

== Life ==
Itō Jirō was born in Izu Province as the second son of Itō Sukeie. His grandfather was Kudō Suketaka, the founder of the Itō clan.

He fought against his nephew (also said to be his cousin) Kudō Suketsune over the division of the territory of his family estate, Itō Manor. The manor was ultimately inherited by Suketsune, but Sukechika took over the manor while Suketsune was in Kyoto. Sukechika also made his daughter, Mangō Gozen, who was married to Suketsune, divorce him.

Suketsune was deeply angered over these events and ordered the assassination of Sukechika. In October 1176, a group of thugs attacked Sukechika, who was hunting in Okuno, Izu Province with his son Kawazu Sukeyasu. The arrow shot at Sukechika missed, and hit Sukeyasu instead, killing him. Sukeyasu's two sons, Tokimune and Sukenari later killed Suketsune in 1193, which came to be known as the Revenge of the Soga Brothers.

Sukechika later served the Taira clan, and governed the Kawazu Manor in Izu Province. He took the name Kawazu from the Kawazu Manor he lived in, thus establishing the Kawazu clan.

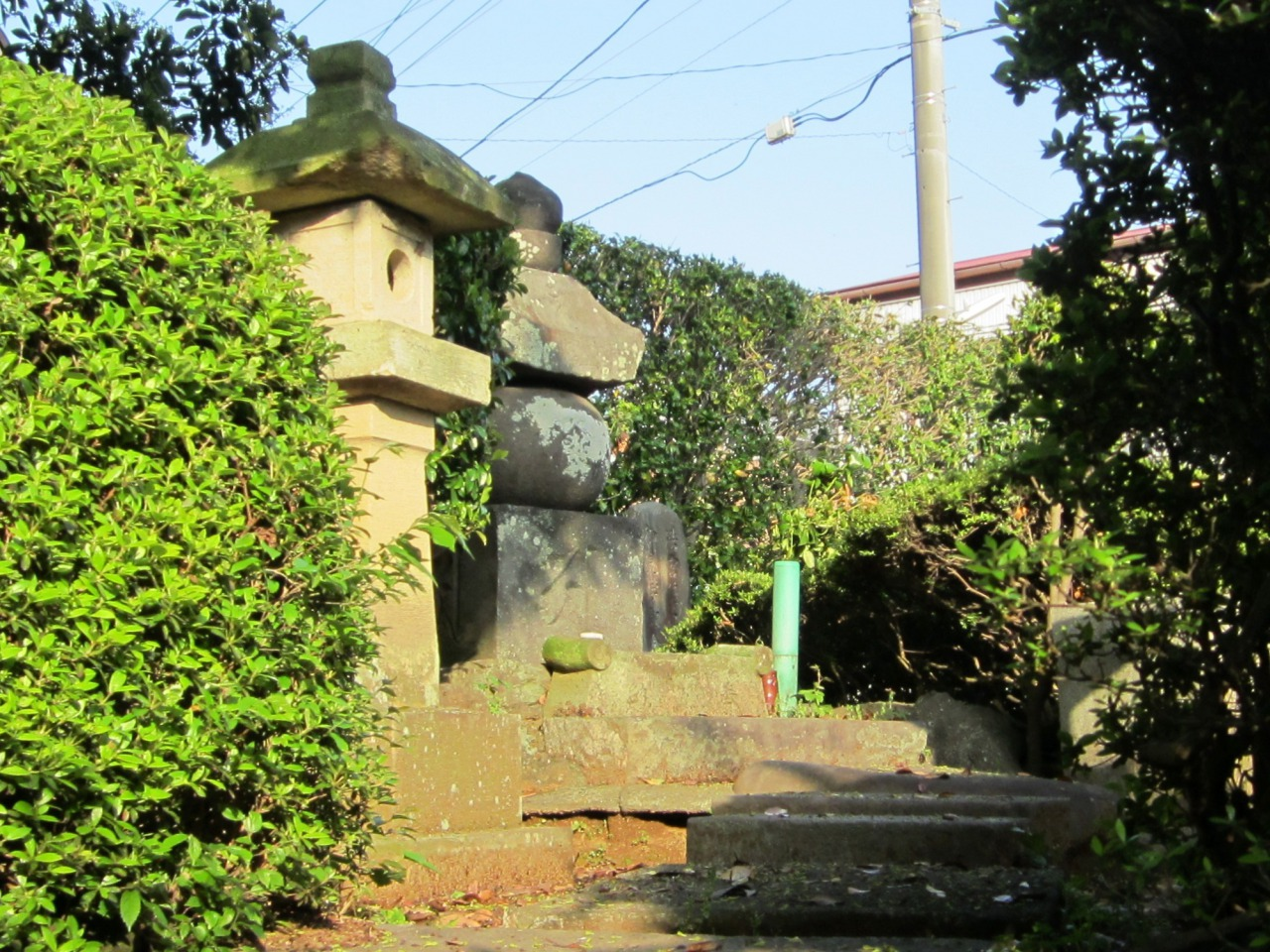
Grave of Itō Sukechika in Itō, Shizuoka

Sukechika attempted to kill Minamoto no Yoritomo, who was exiled to Izu Province, over an alleged relationship between Yoritomo and Sukechika's daughter. In 1180, Sukechika surrounded Yoritomo at Ishibashiyama, and succeeded in routing Yoritomo's force. However, during the Battle of Fujigawa, Sukechika was caught by the Minamoto clan, and his captivity was entrusted to his son-in-law, Miura Yoshizumi. Thanks to Yoshizumi's relentless efforts, Sukechika was pardoned, but committed suicide by the sword from his own shame on March 20, 1182.

== Genealogy ==
The Itō clan were a gōzoku clan that claimed descent from the Fujiwara clan, a powerful family of Japanese regents and court nobility, through Fujiwara no Korekimi (727–789).

The two grandsons of Sukechika, Tokimune and Sukenari, known as the Soga brothers, are known for the Revenge of the Soga Brothers incident of 1193. In the early modern period, the Itō clan were the lords of Obi Domain in Hyūga Province.

== Family ==
- Father: Itō Sukeie
- Siblings:
  - Brother: Itō Suketsugu
- Wife: Unknown
  - Son: Kawazu Sukeyasu
  - Son: Kawazu Sukekiyo
  - Daughter: Miura Yoshizumi's wife
  - Daughter: Mangō Gozen (Kudō Suketsune's first wife, Dohi Tōhira's wife)
  - Daughter: Yaehime

== In popular culture ==
=== TV series ===
- Kusa Moeru (1979) NHK Taiga Drama, Akira Kume as Itō Sukechika
- Taira no Kiyomori (2012) NHK Taiga Drama, Ryūta Mine as Itō Sukechika
- The 13 Lords of the Shogun (2022) NHK Taiga Drama, Kazuyuki Asano as Itō Sukechika

== See also ==
- Revenge of the Soga Brothers
- Kawazu gake
