= Soga Tokimune =

Japanese samurai

Soga Tokimune 曾我時致
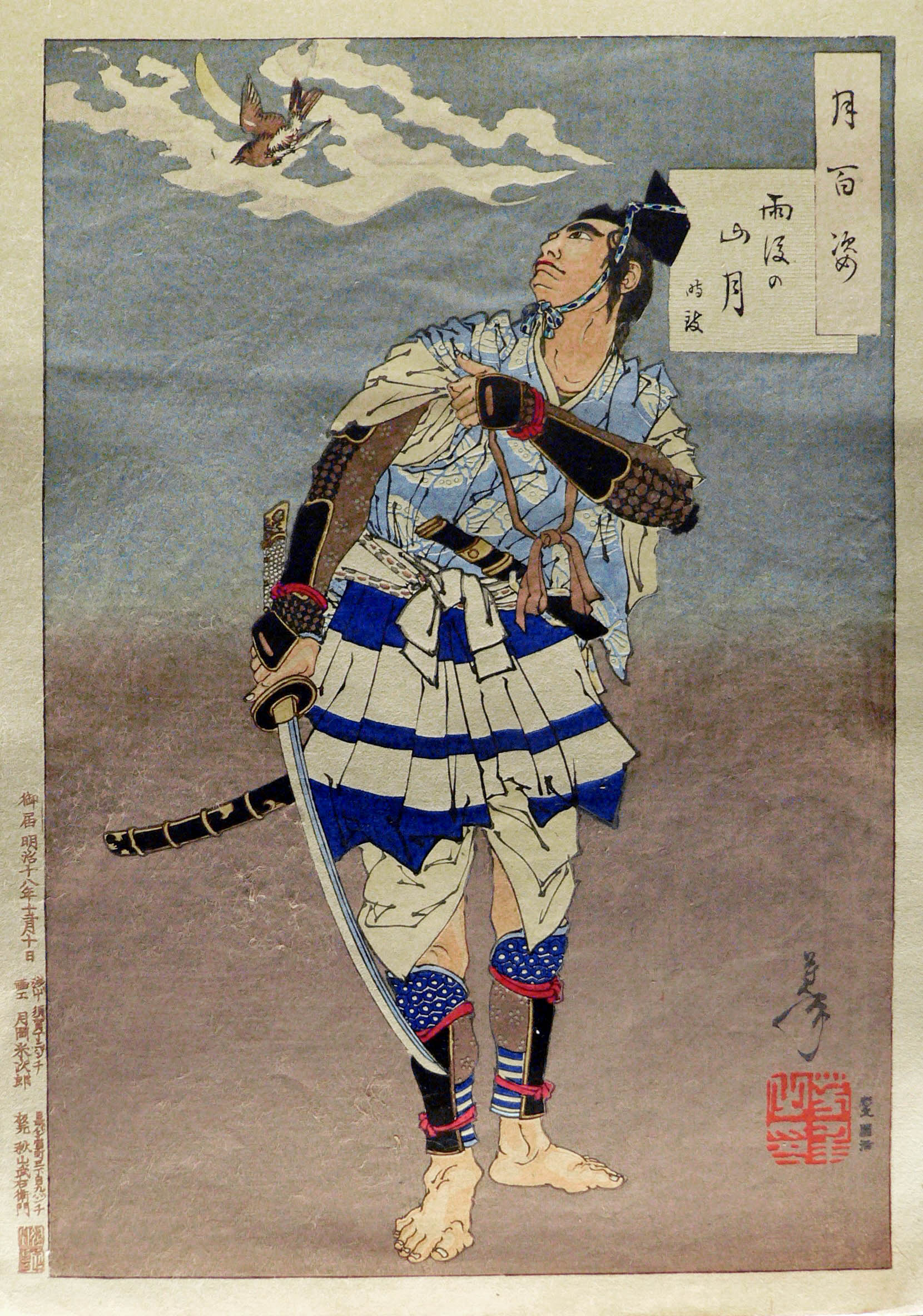
- Tsuki no Hyakushi Ugo no Sangetsu Tokimune by Yoshitoshi
- Born: 1174
- Died: June 29, 1193 (aged 18–19)
- Other names: Gorō, Hako'ō
- Occupation: Samurai
- Children: Kawazu Nobuyuki
- Father: Soga Sukenobu (stepfather); Kawazu Sukeyasu

Soga Tokimune (Japanese: 曾我時致, 1174 - June 29, 1193) was a Japanese samurai in the late Heian and early Kamakura periods. He and his brother Soga Sukenari are known for being the perpetrators of the Revenge of the Soga Brothers incident. He is a central character in noh and kabuki Sogamono plays, which are based on the revenge. He is also known as Soga Gorō.

== Life ==
=== Early life and family ===
Tokimune was born Kawazu Hako'ō (河津 筥王) in 1174, the son of Kawazu Sukeyasu, a gōzoku in Izu Province. He had an elder brother, Ichimanmaru (later Sukenari). Through his father, the eldest son of Itō Sukechika, he descended from the Itō clan, a branch of the Kudō clan, and through Fujiwara no Korekimi (727–789), ultimately the Fujiwara clan, a powerful family of Japanese regents and court nobility.

In 1176, when Hako'ō was two years old, his biological father, Kawazu Sukeyasu, was killed by Kudō Suketsune, who accidentally killed him during an assassination attempt on Itō Sukechika. Suketsune and Sukechika had been quarreling over the inheritance of land. After Sukeyasu's death, Hako'ō's mother remarried to Soga Sukenobu, the lord of Soga Manor in Sagami Province (in present-day Odawara, Kanagawa Prefecture). Sukenobu became the stepfather of Hako'ō and Ichimanmaru, and the brothers became members of the Soga clan. The Soga clan was founded by Soga Sukeie, an eighth generation descendant of Taira no Yoshifumi, and they descended from the Kanmu Heishi line of the Taira clan through the Chiba clan, making them direct descendants of the 8th century Emperor Kanmu. Hako'ō and his brother are said to have mourned for their biological father.

The Soga brothers had a difficult upbringing, and the elder brother Sukenari took over the Soga family. Hako'ō hated priesthood and escaped from Hakone, relying on his uncle by marriage, Hōjō Tokimasa, whose late wife was the daughter of Sukechika. Hako'ō held his coming-of-age ceremony (genpuku) at Tokimasa's mansion with Tokimasa as his guardian (eboshi-oya). Tokimasa bestowed the kanji "toki" (時) in his name upon Hako'ō, giving him the imina name Tokimune. Tokimasa would be the greatest supporter of the Soga brothers in the midst of their hardships, and the Soga brothers never forgot their father's vengeance.

=== Revenge and death ===
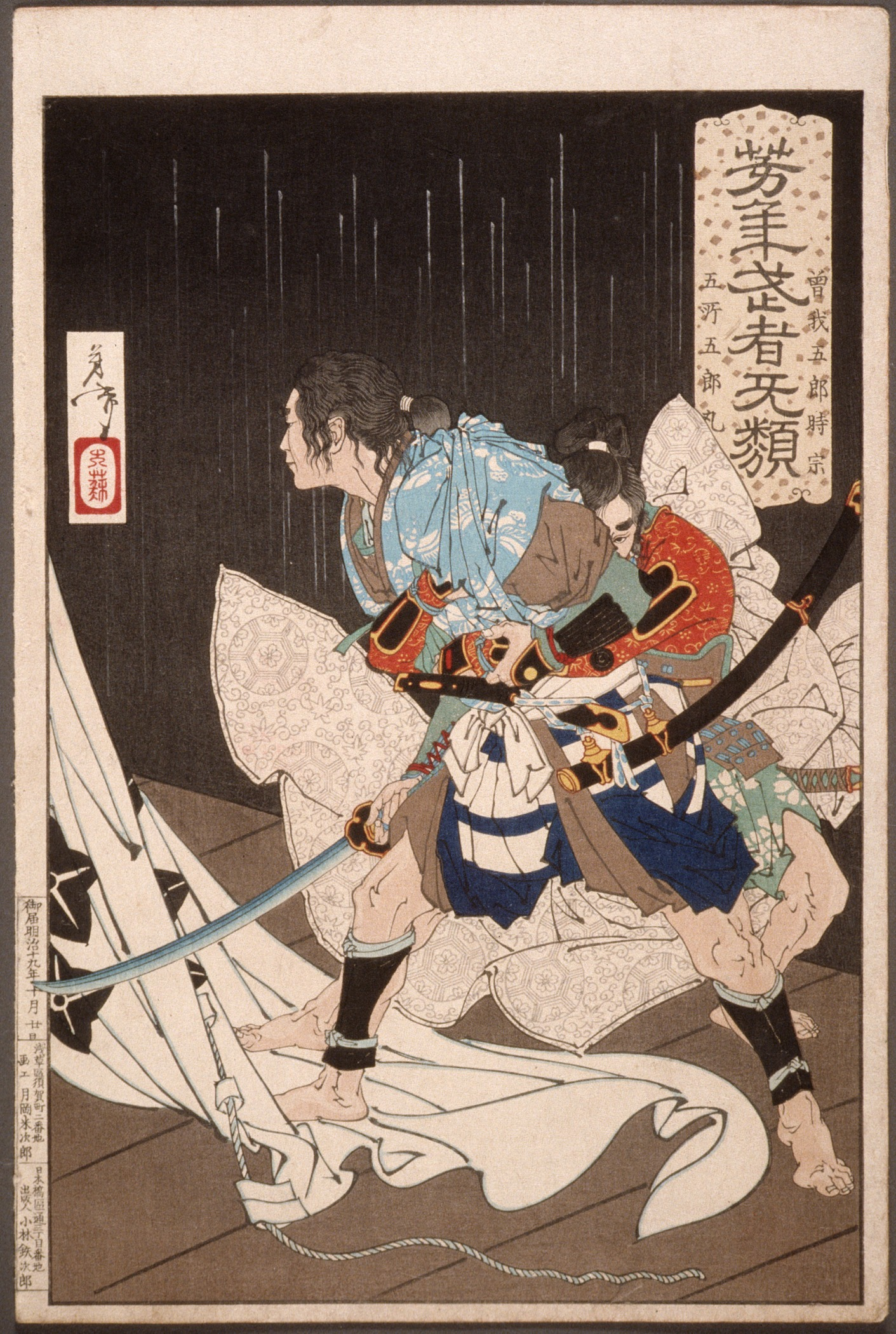
Soga Tokimune being captured by Gosho no Gorōmaru (Tsukioka Yoshitoshi)

In June 1193, the Soga brothers, and their father's killer Suketsune, participated in the founding shogun Minamoto no Yoritomo's grand hunting event, called the Fuji no Makigari, at the foot of Mount Fuji. On June 28, 1193, the last night of the Fuji no Makigari, the brothers set off to kill Suketsune; according to Soga Monogatari, Sukenari was armed with a shakudō tachi sword, and Tokimune with a hyōgogusari tachi sword and a copper sasuga sword. Together, the brothers killed Suketsune, thus fulfilling their vow. They also killed a priest called Ōtōnai who had been accompanying Suketsune. The brothers then began a bloodbath and defeated ten samurai, which became known as jūbankiri ("slashing of ten"), and, according to Soga Monogatari, cut so many that the number of victims is unknown. During the fighting, Nitta Tadatsune killed Sukenari. According to Soga Monogatari, as his last words, Sukenari told Tokimune, "go and present yourself to Lord Kamakura [Minamoto no Yoritomo] unwaveringly." Now alone, it is said that Tokimune stood like an oni and no one dared to charge him. After a brief fight, he stormed into the shogun's mansion attempting to attack the shogun. However, he was apprehended by Yoritomo's strong retainer Gosho no Gorōmaru in the mansion, preventing him from attacking the shogun. According to Soga Monogatari, Gorōmaru locked Tokimune's elbows and tried to bring him down with his own weight, after which Tokimune struggled and tried to find his sword but gave up when he could not find it. After his apprehension, Tokimune was tied up for questioning.

The next day, Tokimune was called in for interrogating about the motives of the massacre. Tokimune insisted Yoritomo personally question him. He gave a detailed explanation about the revenge and its motives. Yoritomo was impressed by Tokimune's bravery, and even expressed his desire to make him his retainer. In Soga Monogatari, Tokimune is said to have been brought to tears after being asked if his mother knew about the revenge, after which Yoritomo and the audience were also brought to tears. Although at first Yoritomo considered sparing his life, Tokimune was executed that day on June 29, 1193, at the request of Suketsune's son, Itō Suketoki.

The youngest brother of Tokimune was invited to Kamakura and joined the elder brothers in death by committing suicide by hanging. A biological brother of the Soga brothers, Hara Kojirō, was executed for the vengeance incident as a collective punishment for Minamoto no Noriyori losing his position and due to his connection to the incident.

== Hōjō Tokimasa Mastermind Theory ==
In ancient accords Azuma Kagami and Soga Monogatari, after killing Suketsune, Tokimune also attempted to attack shogun Minamoto no Yoritomo, which is interpreted as a result of Hōjō Tokimasa's secret maneuvers. Tokimasa had entered Suruga Province and Fujino in advance, before Yoritomo, as a preparation for his secret plan. Furthermore, before that, Tokimasa had established a strong relationship with the Soga brothers, and especially with Tokimune, being his guardian during genpuku and bestowing one of the kanji in his name to Tokimune.

Hiroyuki Miura, along with many others have debated that it was through Tokimasa's strong relation to the Soga brothers that led Tokimune to attack the shogun.

== Graves ==
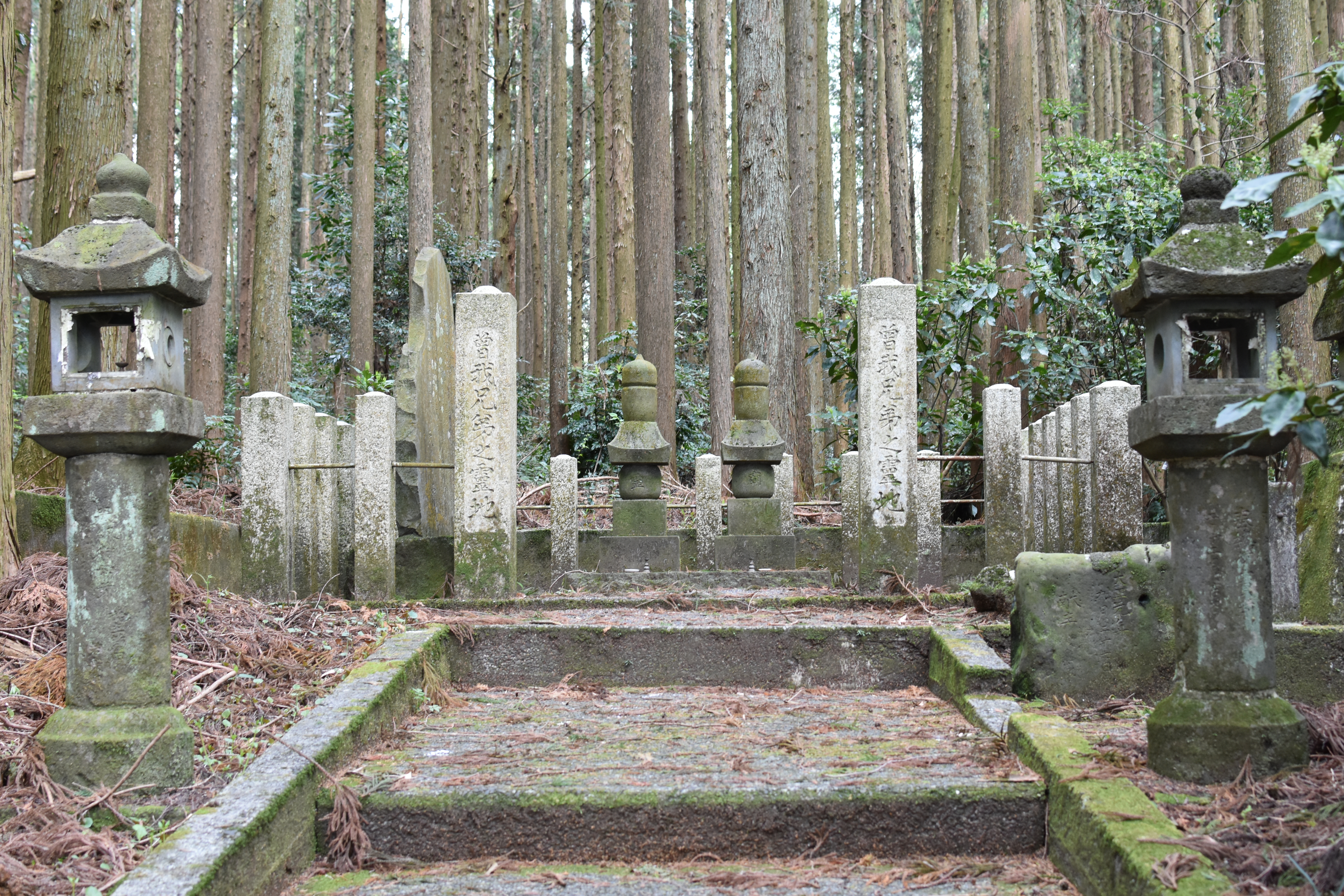
The Soga brothers' grave at Soga Hachiman Shrine, in Kamiide, Fujinomiya, Shizuoka Prefecture

There are the graves of Tokimune and Sukenari at Soga Hachiman Shrine in Kamiide, Fujinomiya, Shizuoka Prefecture. There is another set of graves located at Jōsen-ji temple of the Soga Manor (in present-day Sogayatsu, Odawara, Kanagawa Prefecture) where the brothers grew up. These two gravesites are the two original gravesites of the Soga brothers. However, there are numerous other graves located around Japan dedicated to the Soga brothers' spirits, which are seen as goryō (vengeful ghosts).

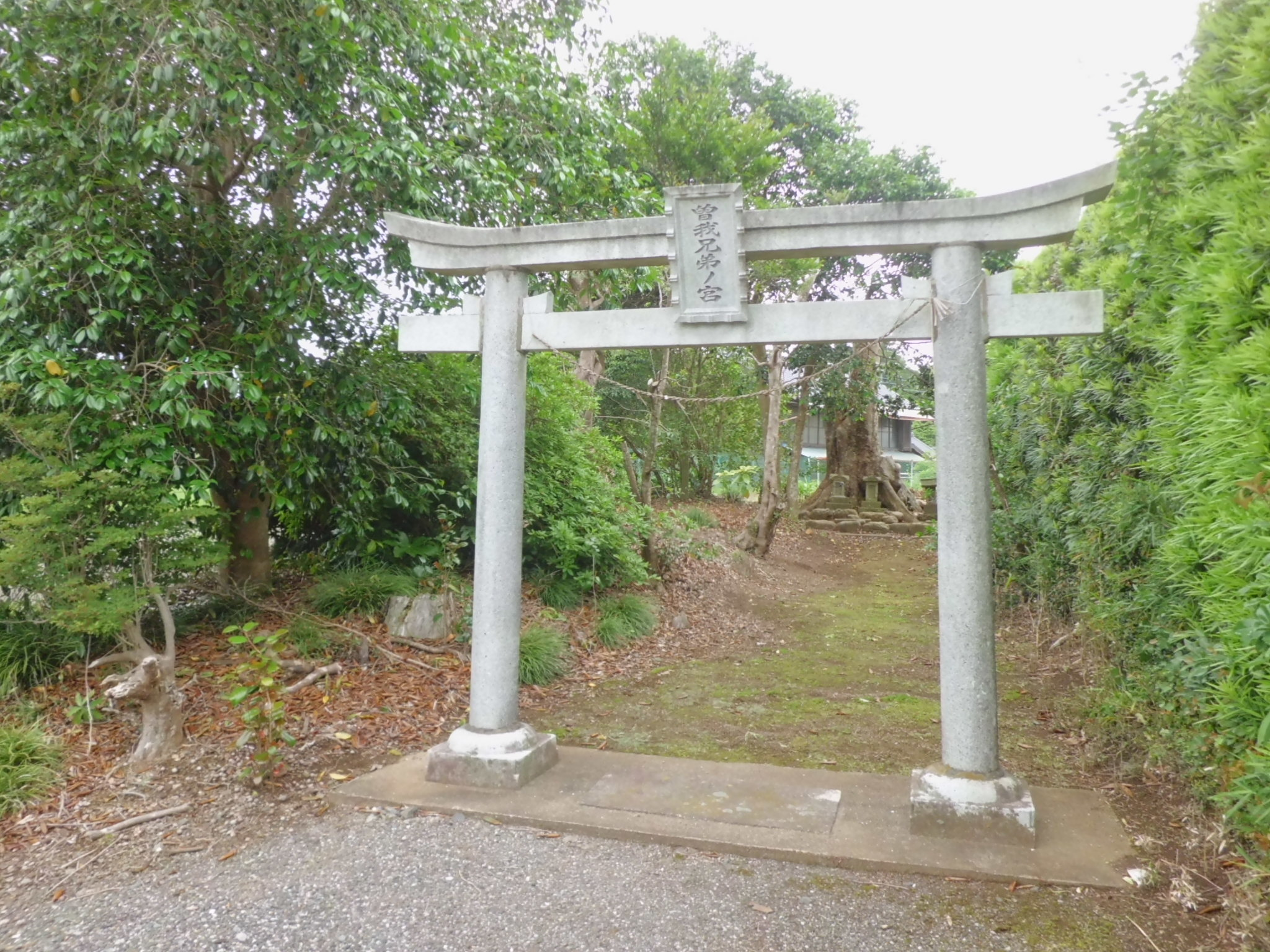
Soga Kyōdai no Miya Shrine in Yamaguwa, Sōsa, Chiba Prefecture

There are graves dedicated to the Soga brothers at Ikō-in temple in Yamaguwa, Sōsa, Chiba Prefecture. It is said that two brothers called Oniōmaru and Danzaburō served Tokimune's father Sukeyasu, and Oniōmaru protected Tokimune and Danzaburō protected Sukenari. The two are said to have continued their service under the Soga brothers after Sukeyasu was killed. It is said that after the Soga brothers were killed, the Oniō brothers buried the Soga brothers' bones in Yamaguwa, the Oniō brothers' home. The graves dedicated to the Soga brothers remain at the Oniō family cemetery.

== Family ==
- Father: Kawazu Sukeyasu
- Stepfather: Soga Sukenobu
- Mother: Yokoyama Tokishige's daughter
- Brothers:
  - Soga Sukenari
  - Hara Kojirō
  - Risshi
- Stepbrothers:
  - Soga Suketsuna
- Children:
  - Kawazu Nobuyuki

== In popular culture ==
=== Filmography ===
- Soga Kyōdai Fuji no Yashū (曽我兄弟 富士の夜襲) (1956) Toei, Soga Tokimune portrayed by Yorozuya Kinnosuke

=== TV series ===
- Kusa Moeru (1979) NHK Taiga drama, Soga Tokimune portrayed by Yasuyoshi Hara
- The 13 Lords of the Shogun (2022) NHK Taiga drama, Soga Tokimune portrayed by Shunsuke Tanaka

=== Theater ===
Soga Tokimune appears in noh and kabuki in the Sogamono plays, which are based on the Revenge of the Soga Brothers incident.

- "Soga Kyōgen" (曽我狂言) is a story about the Revenge of Soga brothers.
- "Soga Moyōtateshi no Gosho-zome" (曽我綉侠御所染) is a story about the Soga brothers and the protagonist Gosho no Gorozō.

=== Art ===
Soga Tokimune has been the subject of several ukiyo-e paintings. The most famous include the following:

- Soga Gorō and Gosho no Gorōmaru (1794) by Sharaku
- Warriors Trembling with Courage: Soga Tokimune and Gosho no Gorōmaru (1886) by Tsukioka Yoshitoshi
- Buei Moyu Kagami by Utagawa Kuniyoshi

== Gallery ==
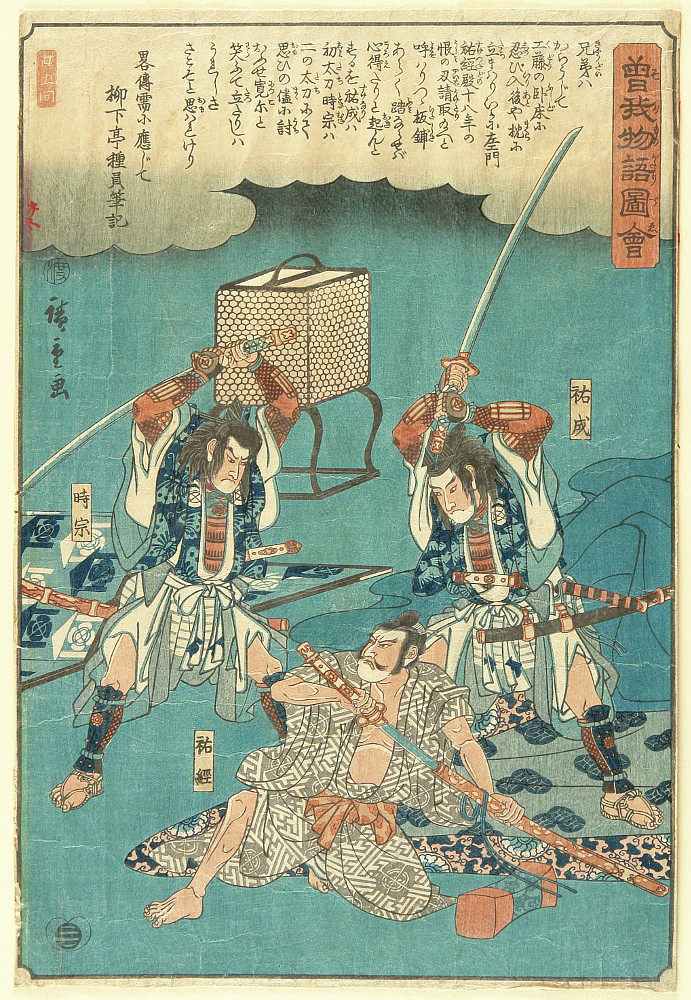
Soga brothers killing Kudō Suketsune by Utagawa Hiroshige

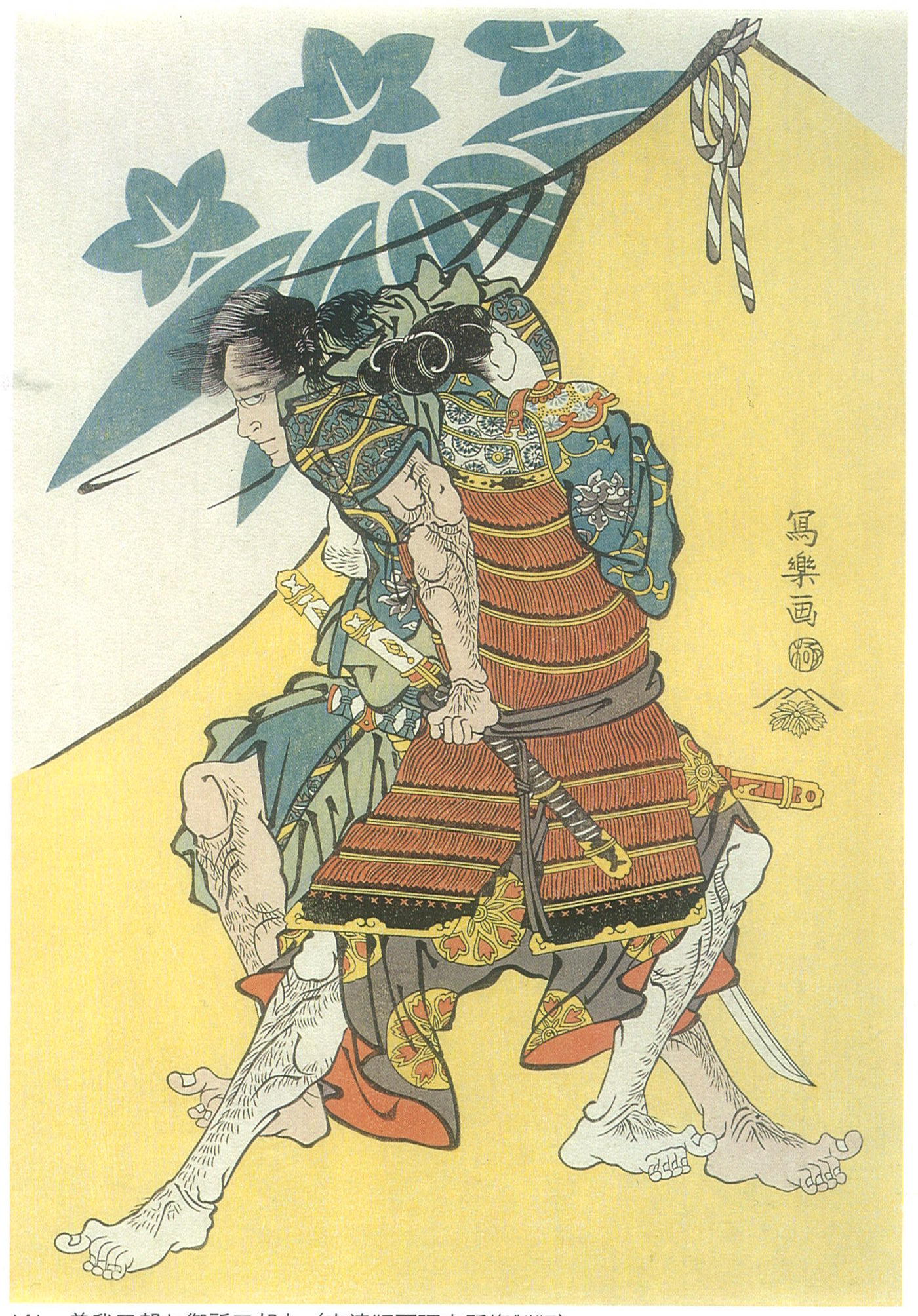
Soga Gorō and Gosho no Gorōmaru by Sharaku

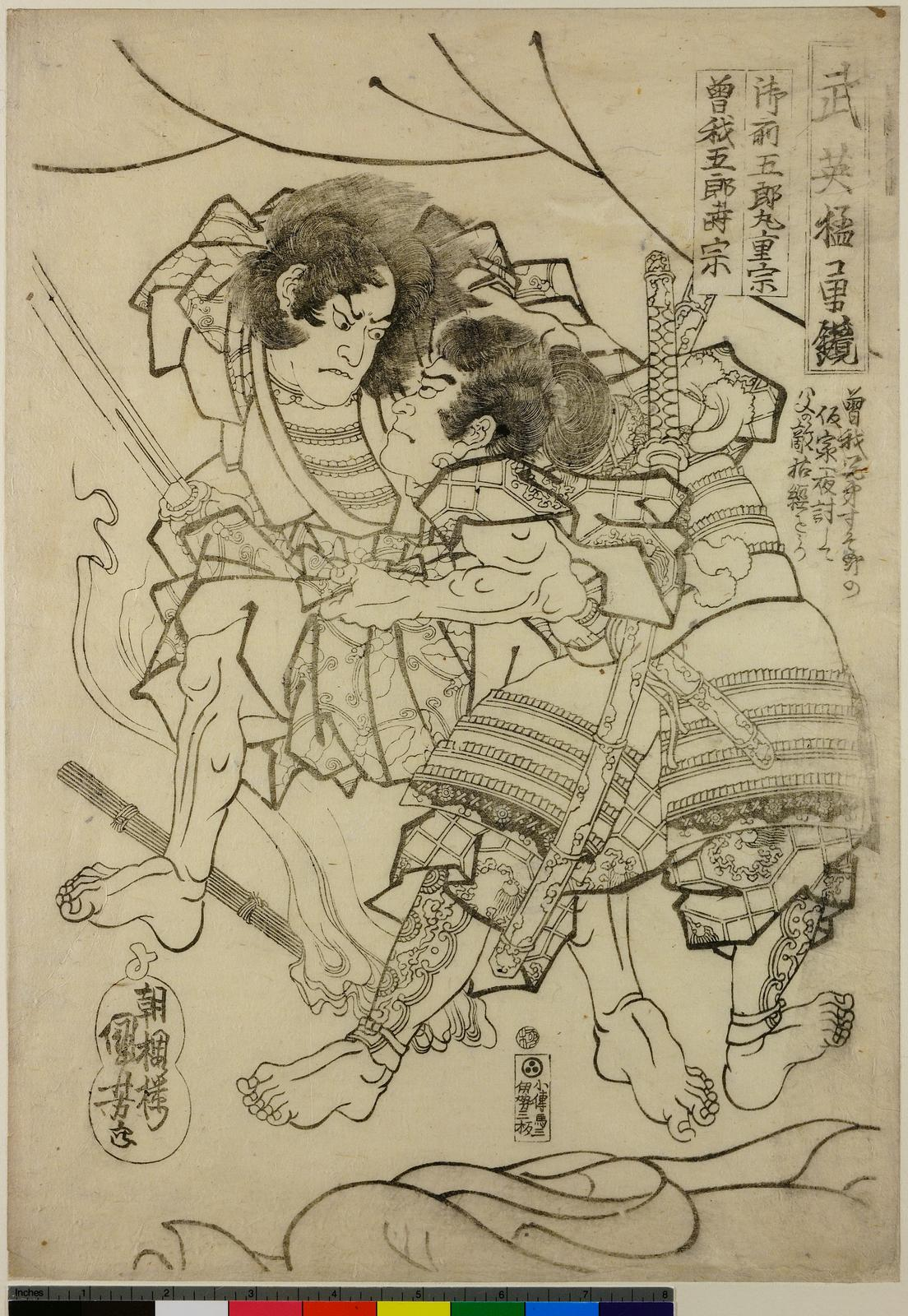
Buei Moyu Kagami by Utagawa Kuniyoshi

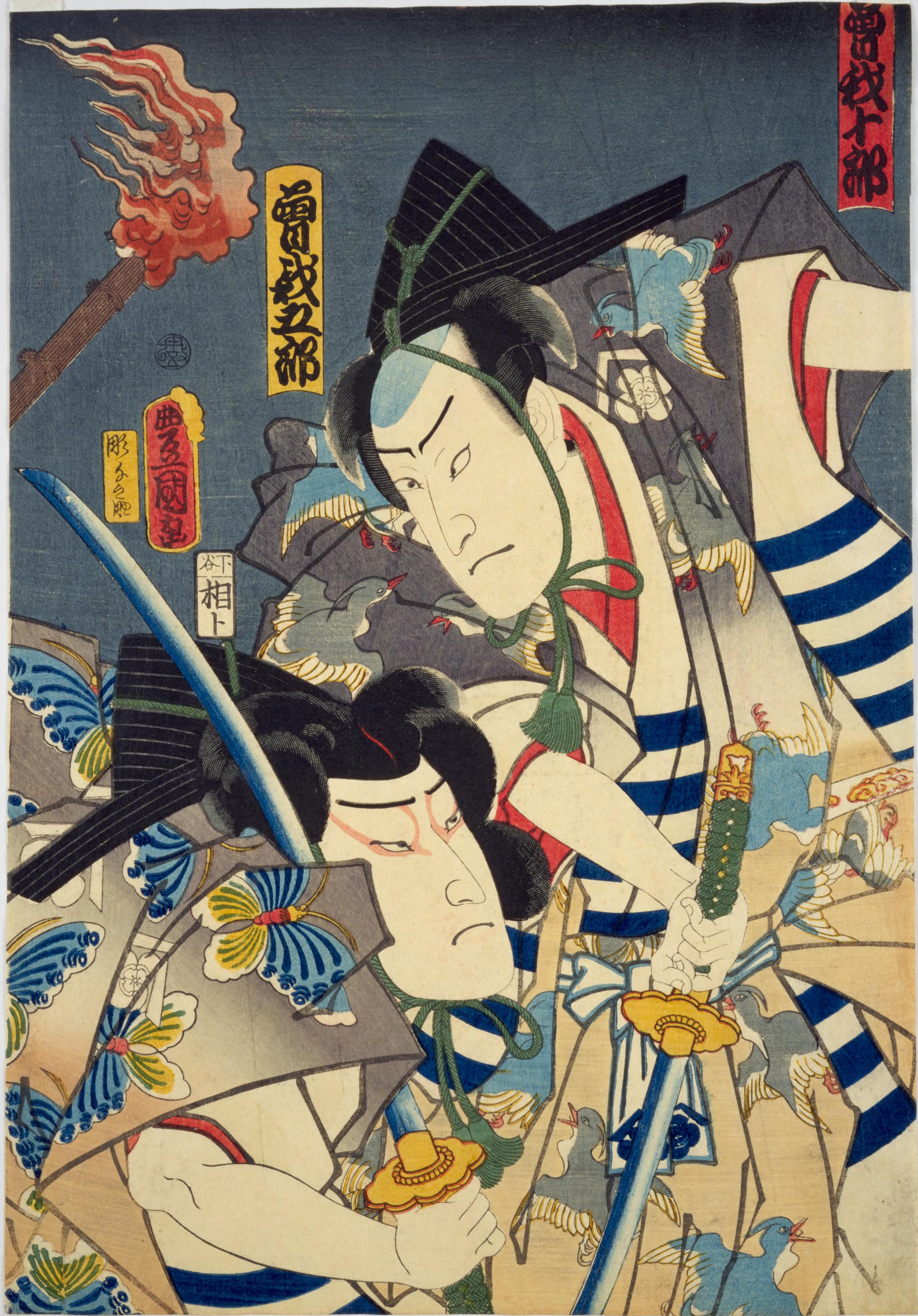
Soga Gorō and Soga Jyūrō by Utagawa Kunisada

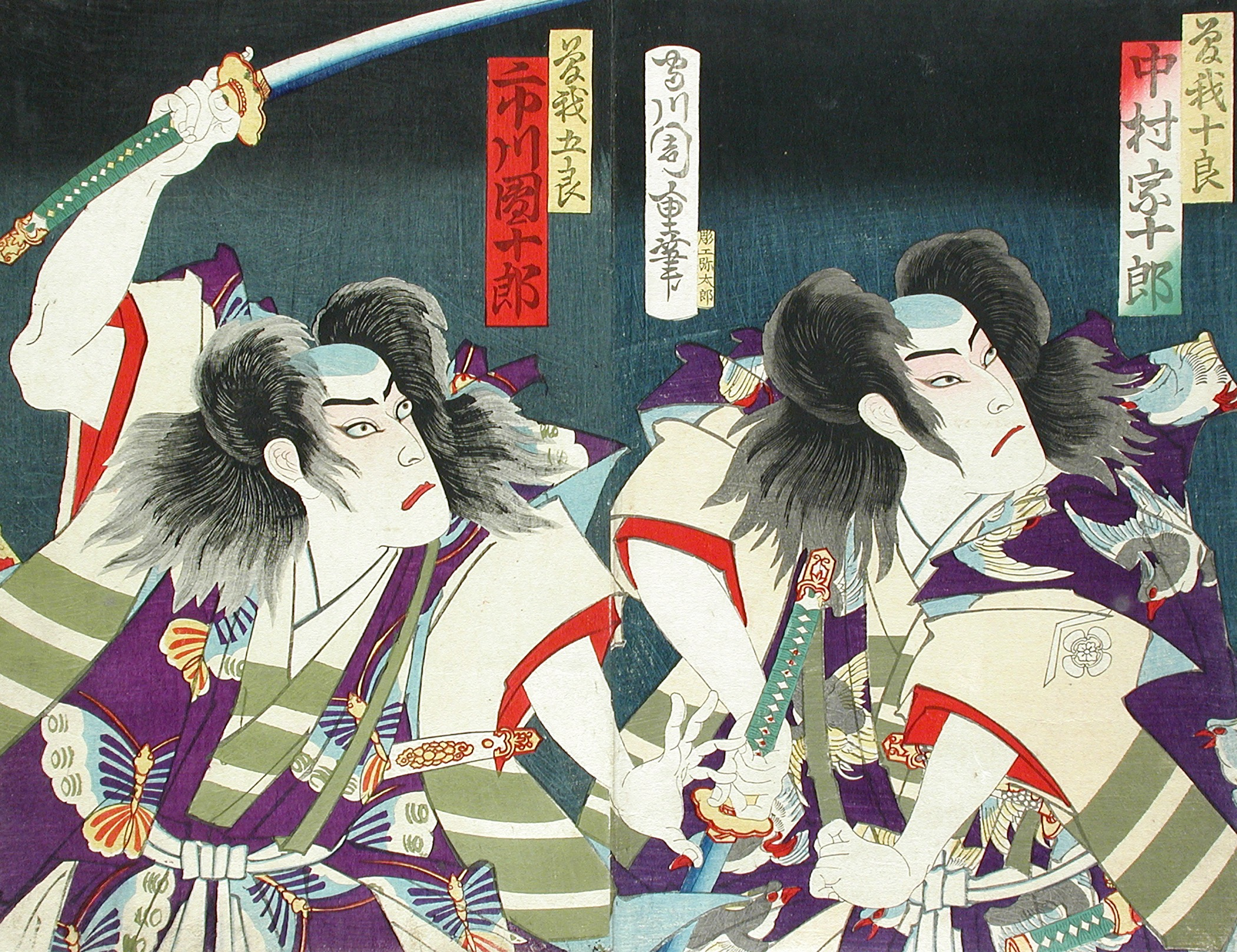
Soga Gorō and Soga Jyūrō by Tsukioka Yoshitoshi

== See also ==
- Revenge of the Soga Brothers
- Soga clan (Sagami Province)
