= Kawazu Sukeyasu =

Kawazu Sukeyasu 河津祐泰
- Died: October 1176
- Occupation: Gōzoku lord
- Children: Soga Sukenari; Soga Tokimune
- Father: Itō Sukechika

Kawazu Sukeyasu (河津 祐泰, died October 1176) was a Japanese samurai lord and the head of a noble clan (gōzoku) in Izu Province during the late Heian period. He was the eldest son of Itō Sukechika descending from the Kudō clan. He was the father of Soga Sukenari and Tokimune, who are known for the Revenge of the Soga Brothers incident, a revenge for the murder of Sukeyasu.

== Life ==
Sukeyasu inherited the Kawazu Manor from his father, Itō Sukechika, and took the family name Kawazu from it. At the time, there was a dispute over the Itō Manor in Izu Province within the Kudō clan. The manor was ultimately inherited by his relative Kudō Suketsune. Dissatisfied with this, Sukechika took over the Itō Manor while Suketsune was in Kyoto. Sukechika also made his daughter, Mangō Gozen, who was married to Suketsune, divorce him.

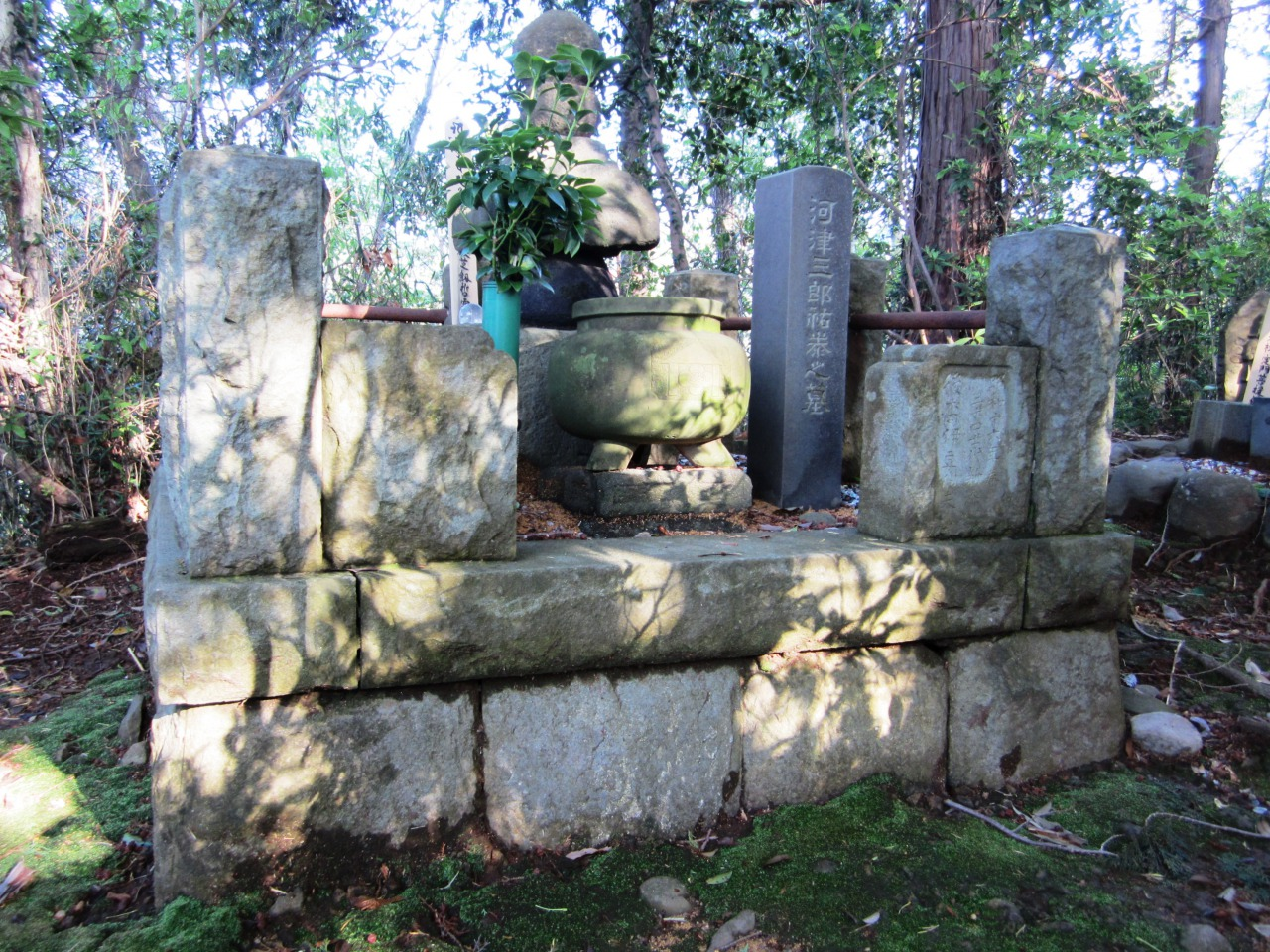
The grave of Kawazu Sukeyasu in Itō, Shizuoka Prefecture

Suketsune held a deep grudge and ordered the assassination of Sukechika. In October 1176, a group of assassins attacked Sukechika and Sukeyasu, who were hunting in Okuno, Izu Province. The arrow shot at Sukechika missed and hit Sukeyasu instead, killing him. He was 31, according to the Soga Monogatari.

At the time of Sukeyasu's death, his two young sons, Sukenari and Tokimune were four and two years old, respectively. Sukeyasu's widowed wife remarried, to Soga Sukenobu, who became her sons' stepfather. On June 28, 1193, during the hunting event known as the Fuji no Makigari, Sukenari and Tokimune avenged their father and killed Suketsune. This incident became known as the Revenge of the Soga Brothers.

== Family ==
- Father: Itō Sukechika
- Siblings:
  - Brother: Itō Sukekiyo
  - Sister: Mangō Gozen (Kudō Suketsune's first wife, Dohi Tōhira's wife)
  - Sister: Hōjō Tokimasa's first wife
  - Sister: Miura Yoshizumi's wife
  - Sister: Yaehime
- Wife: Yokoyama Tokishige's daughter
  - Eldest son: Soga Sukenari
  - Second son: Soga Tokimune
  - Son: Hara Kojirō
  - Son: Risshi

== See also ==
- Revenge of the Soga Brothers
- Kawazu gake
