= Revenge of the Soga Brothers =

1193 vengeance incident in Japan

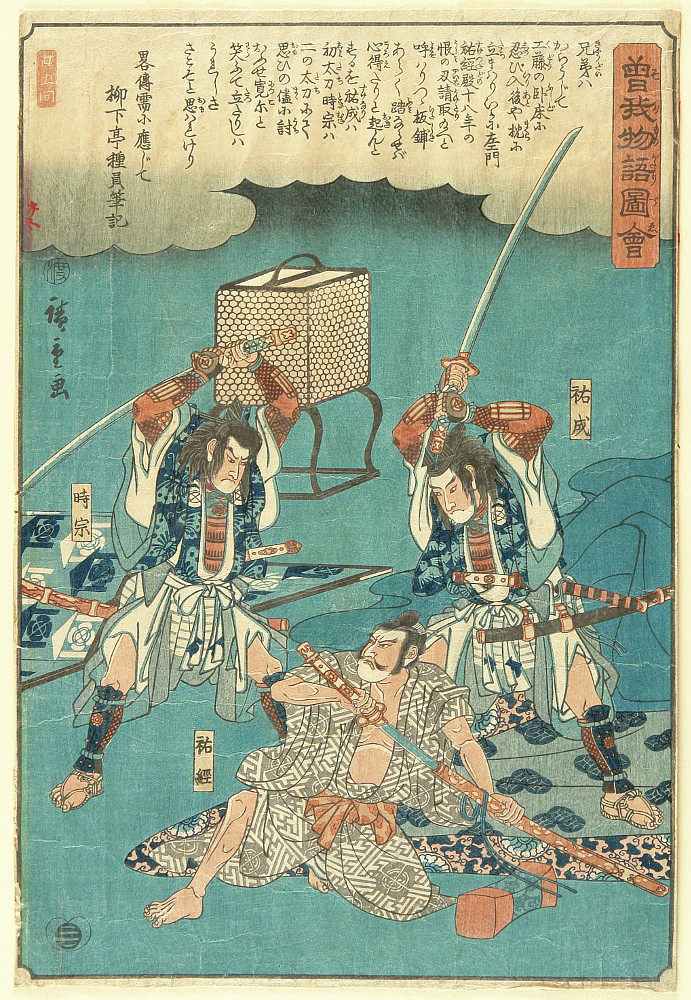
- Soga brothers killing Kudō Suketsune by Utagawa Hiroshige
- Native name: 曾我兄弟の仇討ち
- English name: Revenge of the Soga Brothers
- Date: 28 June 1193
- Venue: Fuji no Makigari
- Location: Kamino, Fujino, Suruga Province (in present-day Shizuoka Prefecture)
- Type: Revenge, assassination attempt
- Cause: Murder of Kawazu Sukeyasu
- Target: Kudō Suketsune and Minamoto no Yoritomo
- Patron: Hōjō Tokimasa
- Organised by: The Soga brothers (Soga Sukenari and Tokimune)
- Participants: 2
- Outcome: Revenge successful
- Casualties: Soga brothers: 2 Kamakura shogunate: 3+
- Deaths: 5+
- Injuries: 18+
- Arrests: Soga Tokimune apprehended by Gosho no Gorōmaru
- Accused: Soga brothers
- Sentence: Soga Tokimune sentenced to death

The Revenge of the Soga Brothers (曾我兄弟の仇討ち, Soga kyōdai no adauchi) was a vengeance incident on 28 June 1193, during the Fuji no Makigari hunting event arranged by shogun Minamoto no Yoritomo in Fujino, Suruga Province, Japan. The Soga brothers, Soga Sukenari and Tokimune, assassinated Kudō Suketsune, the killer of their biological father. The incident included a failed assassination attempt on the shogun, and resulted in many deaths and injuries of unrelated participants. It is known as one of the three major adauchi (vendetta) incidents in Japan, alongside Akō vendetta (by the 47 Rōnin) and the Igagoe vendetta. The incident is recorded in the historical chronicle Azuma Kagami and the epic tale of Soga Monogatari, and has been popularized in popular culture.

Caused by Kudō Suketsune's accidental killing of Soga brothers' father Kawazu Sukeyasu due to an inheritance disagreement unrelated to Sukeyasu, the Soga brothers assassinated Suketsune during the Fuji no Makigari hunting event. The brothers decided to conduct a massacre to gain attention, and subsequently defeated ten samurai, which became known as jūbangiri ("slashing of ten"). The brothers then slashed countless other samurai to the point that the number of victims is said to be unknown in Soga Monogatari. Sukenari was killed in battle and Tokimune set off to assassinate the shogun, Minamoto no Yoritomo, but was apprehended at the shogun's mansion. Tokimune was then questioned and executed for the crimes.

There is a theory that Hōjō Tokimasa was the mastermind behind this incident and the attempted assassination on the shogun.

== Background ==
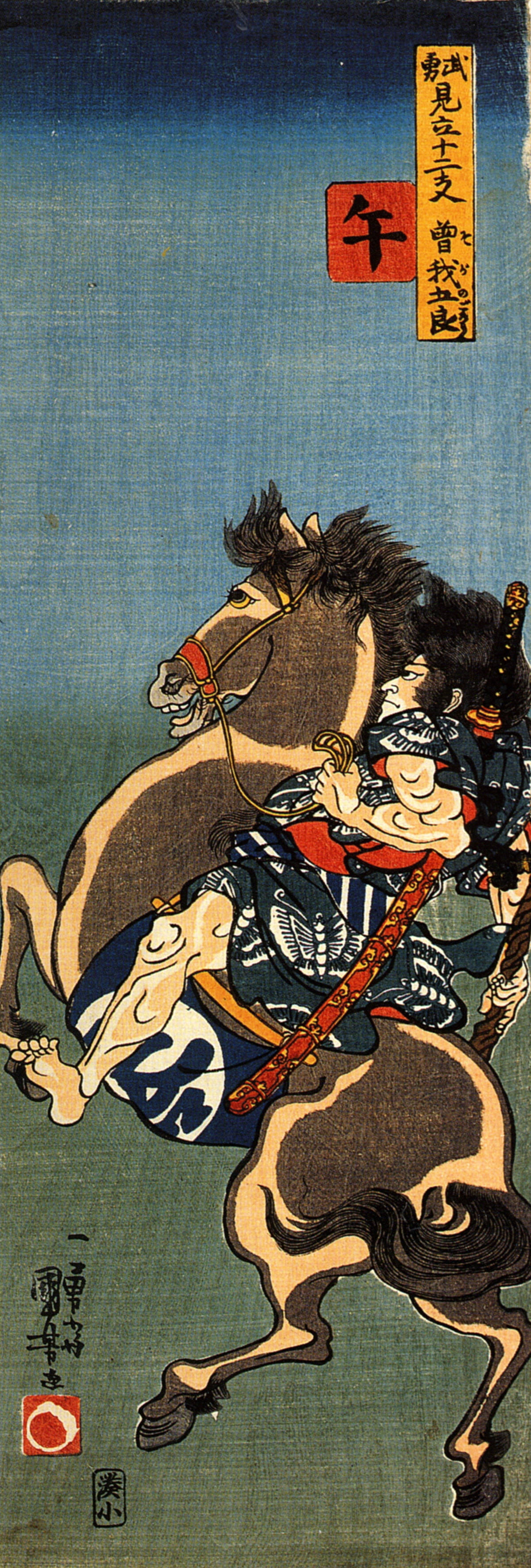
Tokimune galloping to Mount Fuji by Utagawa Kuniyoshi

Kudō Suketsune had a grudge against Itō Sukechika (his former father-in-law) for taking his land and disrupting his marriage. Sukechika had been dissatisfied with the laws of inheritance and the division of land, and was able to take over Suketsune's land by forcing his daughter, Mangō-Gozen, to divorce Suketsune.

In October 1176, Suketsune led a small group and ambushed Sukechika while he was hunting. However, Suketsune's two accomplices accidentally hit Kawazu Sukeyasu, the son of Sukechika who was with him, and Sukeyasu died. The two assassins were killed by Sukechika shortly after the failed assassination attempt. Sukeyasu's widow, Mitsue Gozen, married Soga Sukenobu, and Sukeyasu's two sons thus became known as the Soga brothers. The brothers are said to have mourned for their late father.

Sukechika, who sided with the Taira clan, committed suicide after the loss of the Genpei War in 1185. On the other hand, Suketsune quickly became a gokenin (retainer) of shogun Minamoto no Yoritomo.

The Soga brothers, grandsons of Sukechika, had a difficult upbringing, and the elder brother Sukenari took over the Soga family. The younger brother Tokimune hated priesthood and escaped from Hakone, relying on his uncle by marriage, Hōjō Tokimasa, whose late wife was the daughter of Sukechika. Tokimasa would be the greatest supporter of the Soga brothers in the midst of their hardships, and the Soga brothers never forgot their father's vengeance.

== Azuma Kagami's narrative ==
On June 28, 1193, Soga Sukenari and Tokimune entered the Kamino Inn in Fujino (present-day Kamiide, Fujinomiya, Shizuoka Prefecture) and killed Kudō Suketsune. Kibitsunomiya no Ōtōnai, who had been drinking with Suketsune, was also killed in the process. Prostitutes Tagoshi no Shōshō and Kisegawa no Kamezuru, who were accompanying Ōtōnai and Suketsune, began screaming. Caused by the uproar, people in the vicinity panicked and the guards were alerted.

A battle began between the Soga brothers and the shogun's retainers. Secretary of the Right Division of Bureau of Horses (Uma-no-jō) Tairago Yahei, Aikō Saburō, Kitsukō Kojirō, Katō Ta, Unno Kotarō, Okabe Yasaburō, Hara Saburō, Horifuji Ta, and Usuki Hachirō were wounded in battle. Uda Gorō was killed by the brothers, and Sukenari was killed by Nitta Shirō Tadatsune.

After Sukenari was killed, Tokimune set off to find the shogun and stormed into the shogun's mansion. The shogun drew his sword, but was stopped by Lieutenant of the Left Division of Inner Palace Guards (Sakon no shōgen) Yoshinao. In the meantime, Board of Retainers junior officer (Kodoneri) Gorōmaru had apprehended Tokimune. Tokimune was handed over to Ōmi Koheiji, and Yoshimori and Kagetoki conducted inquest on the dead.

The next day, Tokimune was questioned about the motives of the nightly attack in front of a large audience of the shogun's gokenin. Lord Hōjō, Governor of Izu, Vice Governor of Kazusa, Lord Ema, former Governor of Bungo (Moro Takamitsu), Satomi Kanja, Miura Suke, Hatakeyama Jirō, Lieutenant of the Left Division of Outer Palace Guards Sawara Jūrō, Izawa Gorō, Ogasawara Jirō, Lieutenant of the Left Division of Outer Palace Guards Oyama, Lord of the Manor Shimokōbe, Inage Saburō, Naganuma Gorō, Hangaya Shirō, Chiba Tarō, Utsunomiya Yasaburō, Yuki Shichirō, Lieutenant of the Left Division of Inner Palace Guards Ōtomo, Lieutenant of the Left Division of Outer Palace Guards Wada, Kajiwara Heiza, Kano Suke, and Shingai Arajirō were present, among many other gokenin to the point that "there were too many to count." Kano Suke and Shingai began the questioning and Tokimune gave a detailed explanation about the revenge and its motives. After the questioning, at first Yoritomo proposed to pardon Tokimune for his bravery, but he was executed on the same day at the request of Suketsune's son Inubōmaru.

== Soga Monogatari's narrative ==
=== Revenge ===
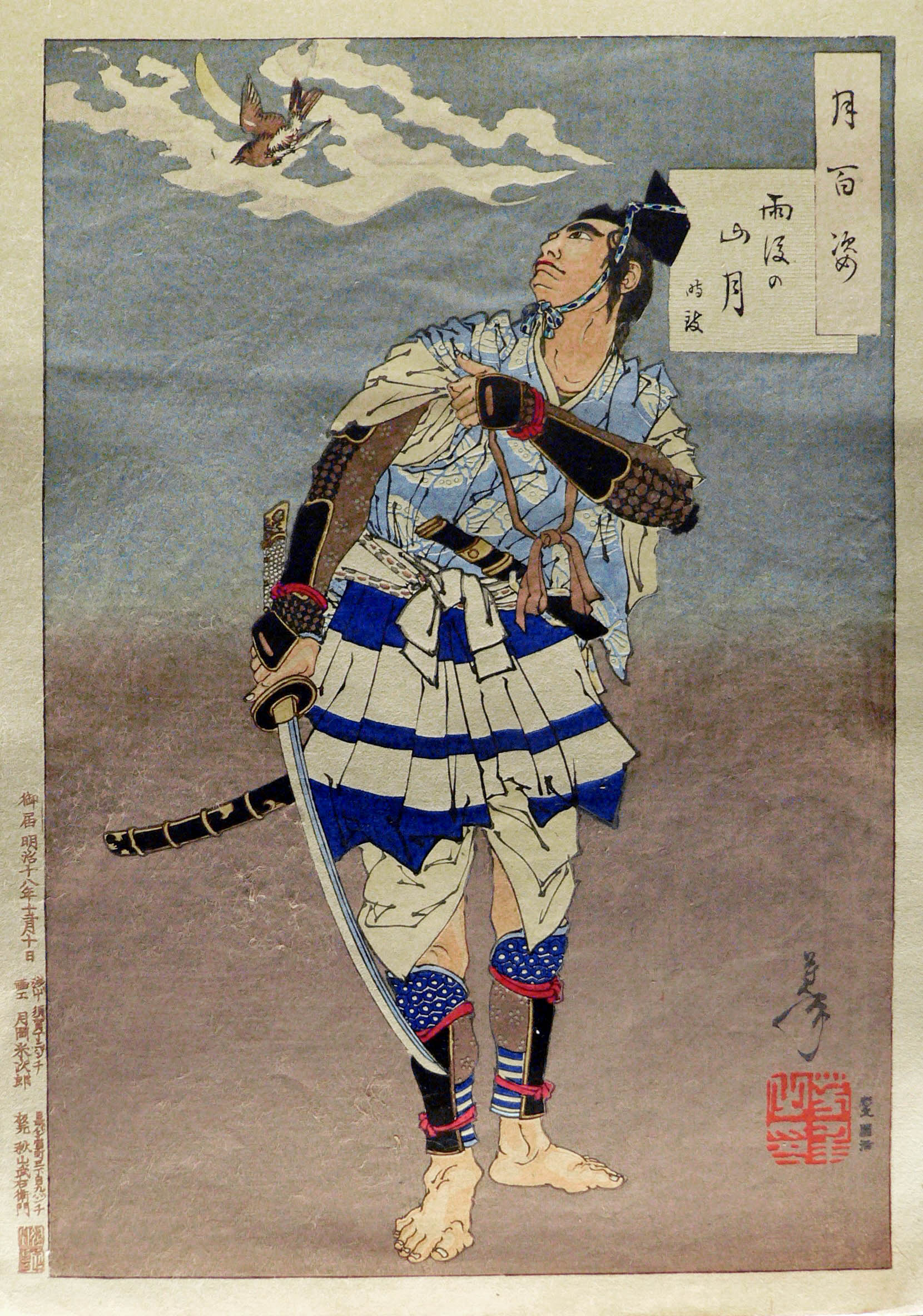
Soga Tokimune watches the moon after the rain before going to attack Minamoto no Yoritomo's quarters. From the ukiyo-e series One Hundred Aspects of the Moon by Tsukioka Yoshitoshi.

On June 28, 1193, the last night of the Fuji no Makigari, the participants were staying in Kamino, Fujino. The Soga brothers had prepared themselves for the revenge; Sukenari was armed with a shakudō tachi sword; and Tokimune with a hyōgogusari tachi sword and a copper sasuga sword. The two drew their swords and set off to find Suketsune. The brothers entered the mansion where Suketsune was staying, swinging their torches in search for Suketsune. There, the brothers found Suketsune sleeping with two prostitutes Ōtōnai and Kisegawa no Kamezuru. Sukenari told Tokimune to take care of Ōtōnai and to leave Suketsune to him. Tokimune refused and suggested that they attack him together and let Ōtōnai escape. Seeing their enemy drunk in deep sleep, Tokimune was overjoyed, but Sukenari wanted to wake him up. Sukenari then stabbed Suketsune in the shoulder and told him, "Hey, lord. Kudō Saemon-no-jō [Kudō Suketsune]. While waiting for enemies this important, you are sleeping like a fool. Wake up." When Suketsune attempted to get up and reach for his sword, Sukenari blew at him, after which Tokimune killed him, thus fulfilling their vow. When Ōtōnai woke up to the sounds of swords and condemned the brothers, they slashed her across the torso and cut her legs off. On the way out, the brothers decided to make sure that Suketsune was really dead, and stabbed and beat his body three times. It was later rumored that "his mouth was cut open."

After Suketsune was confirmed dead, the brothers left the building and proclaimed, "You have probably heard the rumors before. Now, see with your eyes. The young men of Soga have killed the enemy of their father, Kudō Saemon-no-jō, at a shogun's mansion, and now present themselves. Who feels obliged, kill us." However, no one answered. In the meantime, the torches left inside the building by the brothers had set the building on fire, and prostitutes tried to stop the fire with clothes. Because no one answered, Sukenari suggested that they meet with their mother once again and commit suicide in the mountains. Tokimune did not believe they could escape to the mountains and said that he does not want to bring shame and punishment to his family by going into hiding at their parents' house. He suggested that they kill samurai from all across the country, display the dead bodies at the shogun's mansion, and leave their names in history. Sukenari then said that his suggestion was to merely test Tokimune's will.

=== Massacre ===
After deciding to conduct a massacre, the Soga brothers fought ten samurai, Tairago Yahei, Aikō Saburō, Okabe Gorō, Hara Saburō, Gosho no Kuroyago, Unno Kotarō Yukiuji, Katō Tarō, Funakoshitō no Kitsukō Kojirō, Uda Gorō, and Usuki Hachirō at the Ide Mansion. The slashing of these ten samurai became known as jūbangiri ("slashing of ten").

The brothers stormed into the samurai stables and yelled that nightly attackers had entered. Tairago Yahei grabbed his sword and asked the brothers where the nightly attackers were, not knowing it was them. Sukenari then slashed Yahei in the back, who then ran off without a fight. Caused by the uproar, samurai in one to two thousand mansions began asking for their swords, bows, arrows and armors at the same time, causing such a noise that it "shook even the mountains." Hatakeyama Shigetada sent his subordinate Hangiwa no Rokurō to Wada Yoshimori to inform him that this incident was a revenge against Kudō Suketsune and was not important to the shogun. Thus, the mansions of Shigetada and Yoshimori stayed calm.

In the meantime, Aikō Saburō attacked the brothers. However, Tokimune cut him in the right shoulder, forcing him to retreat. Okabe Gorō then attacked Sukenari, but Sukenari cut two of his fingers off. Gorō then retreated and ran to the courtyard telling people not to hassle as there were only two enemies. After this, Hara Saburō attacked, but was wounded badly by Tokimune, who slashed him from the ribs all the way down to the hip bone. Next, Gosho no Kuroyago attacked, but Sukenari blew at him forcing him to retreat and wounded him in the neck cutting the hair on his temple. After this, Unno Kotarō Yukiuji and Katō Tarō attacked Sukenari. Tokimune cut Tarō in middle of the chest and Yukiuji in the shoulder blade. Next, Funakoshitō no Kitsukō Kojirō attacked, but had his elbow cut by Tokimune. After this, Uda Gorō exchanged blows with Sukenari, but was cut in the right arm and forced to retreat. Next, Usuki Hachirō blew at Tokimune, but Tokimune hit his sword into the ground and slashed his head off. It is said that none of the samurai had a chance at fighting the brothers.

After defeating ten samurai, the brothers entered the panicking crowd, cutting down so many that the number of victims is unknown. Stable keeper Tokitake initiated a light-up of the dark area unfit for battle. After the area was lit up by countless torches, Yōki Saburō attacked, but was cut in the shoulder by Tokimune. After this, Ichikawa Bettō Jirō attacked Tokimune, but was cut from the groin to the knee and crawled away.

Nitta Shirō Tadatsune joined the fight late and criticized the poor strategy of the samurai against just two enemies. He told the samurai to separate the two brothers and surround them. Tadatsune attacked Sukenari, who told him that he was hoping to fight with him as he was yet to meet a worthy enemy. Although Sukenari managed to cut Tadatsune's forearm and the hair on his temple, he was getting tired and his bloody sword slipped from his hand, forcing him to retreat. Hara Saburō tried to join but was cut in the side, after which Koshibagaki no Kage almost hit Sukenari's elbow causing him to lose control. Tadatsune took advantage of this, and cut Sukenari from the left shoulder all the way under the right breast. As his last words he said, "Where is Gorō [Tokimune]? Sukenari has been defeated by the hands of Nitta Shirō. If you have not been wounded yet, go and present yourself to Lord Kamakura [Minamoto no Yoritomo] unwaveringly," after which he fell down and died. Tokimune, having heard this, headed towards Sukenari cutting down all the samurai in his way, but was overpowered and forced to retreat.

=== Tokimune's apprehension ===
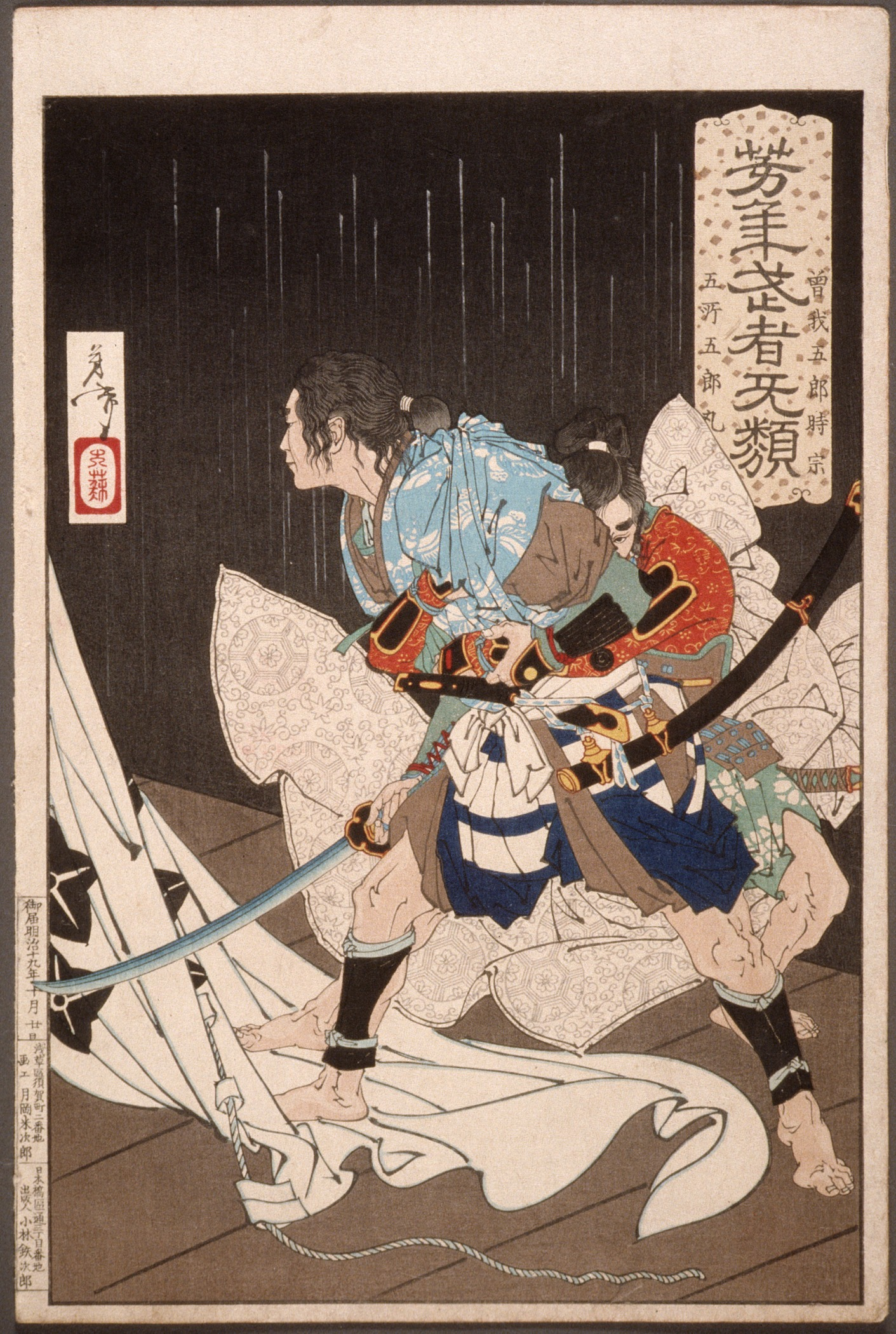
Gosho no Gorōmaru capturing Soga Tokimune. From the ukiyo-e series Warriors Trembling with Courage by Tsukioka Yoshitoshi.

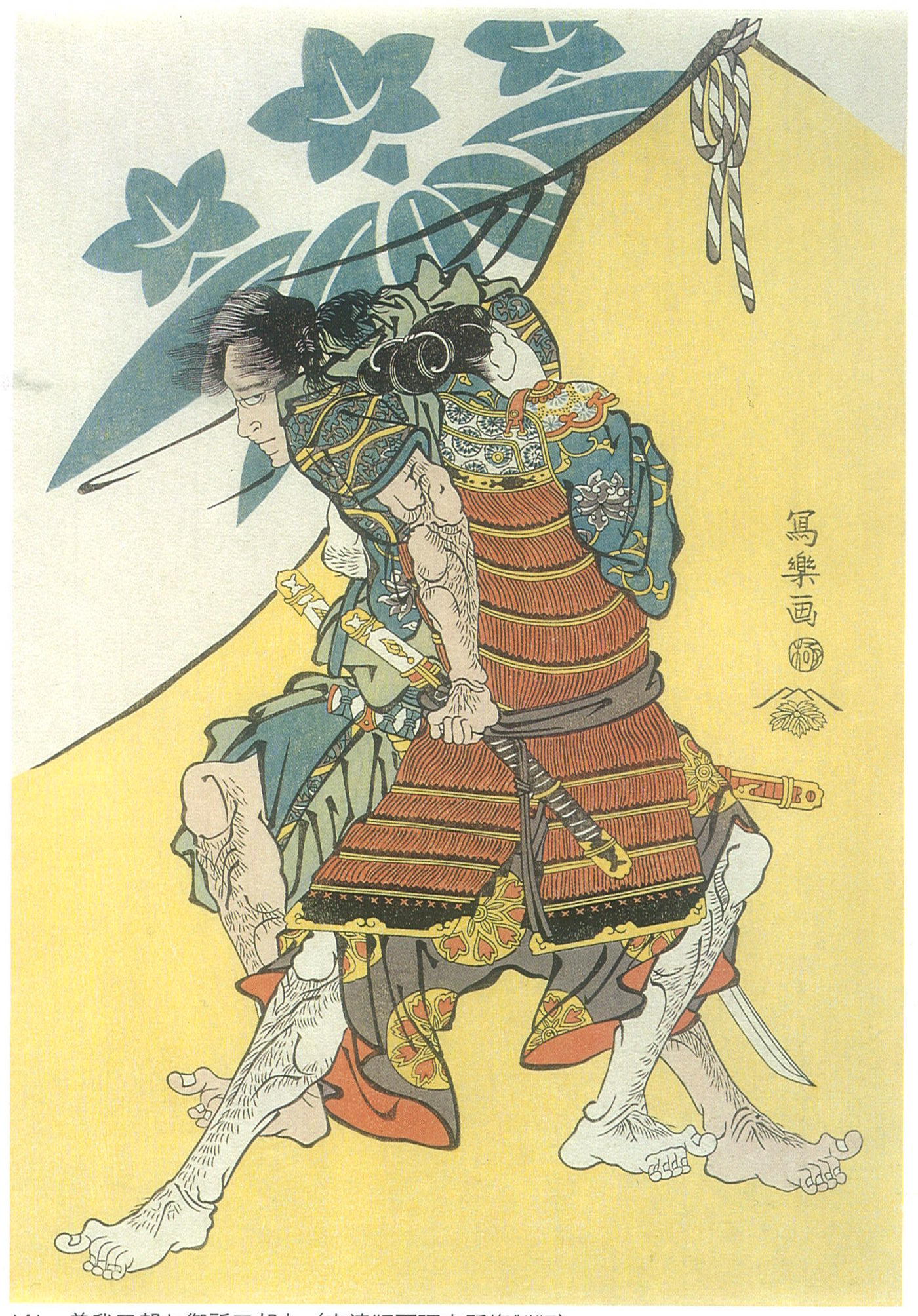
Gosho no Gorōmaru capturing Soga Tokimune by Sharaku

Now alone, it is said that Tokimune stood like an oni and no one dared to charge him. However, Hori Tōji charged Tokimune with a concealed sword, but a silver sheath gave him off. Tokimune attacked him right away and chased him into the shogun Yoritomo's living quarters. Gorōmaru, a young man famed for his "superhuman strength" and a Yoritomo's favorite, was disguised as a woman to ambush Tokimune. Tokimune did not notice him and was apprehended by Gorōmaru at the entrance, who locked his elbows and tried to bring him down with his own weight. However, Tokimune struggled and dragged him two or three ken, and Gorōmaru shouted that he had apprehended the enemy. Tokimune then tried to reach for his sword but could not find it. Finally, Kako Tarō and Miumaya no Koheiji arrived at the scene and the three grabbed Tokimune by the feet, arms, and bun, dragging him outside.

Caused by the turmoil, shogun Minamoto no Yoritomo came out with his haramaki armor on and sword drawn asking why the samurai were causing disorder near the shogun. Ōtomo Yoshinao calmed him down and Koheiji reported to Yoritomo that the nightly attackers had been taken down. Yoritomo told Koheiji to take care of Tokimune, after which Koheiji's retainer Kunimitsu bound him onto a pillar and kept a watch on him.

=== Tokimune's questioning ===
The next day, Tokimune was called in for questioning by Yoritomo about the motives of the massacre. When Ogawa Kojirō criticized having a noble-class person tied up like a bandit, Tokimune explained how being tied up for killing his father's killer was an honor of filial duty, and the public was impressed. Kano Suke and Shingai Arajirō began the interrogation, but when Arajirō tried to untie Tokimune's ropes, Tokimune strongly opposed and requested that the shogun question him. Yoritomo declined the request but showed up nonetheless.

When Yoritomo asked Tokimune about the revenge, Tokimune gave him a thorough explanation about the revenge and its motives. He lied about having bought the swords in Kyoto to cover up the fact that the swords were from his mentor's bettō. When Yoritomo asked why the brothers had chosen this occasion, Tokimune explained how they had been keeping a watch on Suketsune for years, but he had always been surrounded by 50 to 100 cavalrymen. Yoritomo expressed his understanding for the revenge, but asked him why the brothers had attacked innocent samurai. Tokimune explained that they had cut the samurai after seeing that all of Yoritomo's retainers were cowards that would run away upon seeing a sword. Yoritomo then asked why he had been apprehended by Gorōmaru. Tokimune explained that he had mistaken Gorōmaru for a regular retainer, and would have attacked him right away had he recognized him. When Yoritomo asked why he had entered the shogun's area, Tokimune responded that he had merely chased Hori Tōji there. Yoritomo doubted this and asked if he had a grudge against him. Tokimune responded that he had a grudge against Yoritomo for favoring Suketsune, and that Sukenari had told him to "present himself to the shogun" as his last words; killing the shogun would be a better way to leave their names in history than killing countless samurai. Yoritomo disregarded the grudge, and was so impressed by Tokimune's bravery that he expressed his desire to make Tokimune his retainer and save his life. However, Kajiwara told Yoritomo that Tokimune could not be forgiven as Suketsune's son Inubō (Itō Suketoki) and younger brother Kanabōshi (Kudō Sukenaga) would in turn seek revenge against Tokimune, and it was decided that Tokimune would be executed.

Yoritomo questioned Tokimune about any associates, and Tokimune answered that they had worked alone and that their half-brother Kojirō and cousin Miuchi Yoichi had turned them down. When Yoritomo asked if they had let their mother know about the revenge, Tokimune said there was no mother that would allow their sons to go and die, and broke out in tears. Yoritomo and the people at the scene were also brought to tears. Suketsune's nine-year-old son Inubō arrived at the scene and began beating Tokimune with a hand fan. Tokimune told him that he felt the same way when his father was killed, and told Inubō to beat him with a pine stick instead. After Inubō hit Tokimune with a pine stick, Yoritomo told him to step aside to continue the questioning.

After this, Sukenari's body was identified by Nitta Tadatsune and Yoritomo. Wada Yoshimori and Kajiwara Kagetoki conducted inquest on the dead.

== Interpretations ==
=== Hōjō Tokimasa Mastermind Theory ===
Hiroyuki Miura advocated the Hōjō Tokimasa Mastermind Theory in the Taishō era, which has had a great influence on the academia ever since. In Azuma Kagami and Soga Monogatari, after killing Suketsune, Tokimune also attempted to attack shogun Minamoto no Yoritomo, which is interpreted as a result of Tokimasa's secret maneuvers. Tokimasa had entered Suruga Province in advance as a preparation for his secret plan, and even when Yoritomo arrived at Fujino, he had visited Fujino in advance, which has brought conviction to this theory. Furthermore, before that, the Soga brothers had a strong relationship with Tokimasa. Tokimune had also had his coming-of-age ceremony (genpuku) at Tokimasa's mansion with Tokimasa as his guardian (eboshi-oya), Tokimasa bestowing the kanji "toki" (時) in his name upon Tokimune. Many still debate that Tokimasa, who had been acquainted with the Soga brothers, led Tokimune to attack Yoritomo.

=== Minamoto no Yoritomo Revenge Theory ===
In addition, Itō Sukechika had killed Yoritomo's eldest son, Chizuru Maru (Chizuru Gozen), just before being attacked by Kudō Suketsune. There is also a theory that the Soga brothers knew that Yoritomo was behind the attack on Sukechika.

== Aftermath ==
After the incident, Sukenari's mistress and a prostitute, Tora, mourned at the mansion of Ide in Fujino, the site of the revenge and the site where Sukenari died. A shrine was later erected in that place.

From the issue relating the samurai of the Hitachi Province that fled without defending Yoritomo during this incident, and the fact that Take Yoshimoto of the Hitachi Province unfurled the standard of revolt shortly after the incident, there is a theory that this deepened Minamoto no Yoritomo's suspicion towards his general, Minamoto no Noriyori.

There is also a theory that Minamoto no Noriyori, a half-brother of Yoritomo, did not participate in the Fuji no Makigari, and that it was related to the later exile of Noriyori.

== Differences between Azuma Kagami and Soga Monogatari ==
=== Yoritomo and the Soga brothers ===
The differences in Minamoto no Yoritomo's treatment of the Soga brothers between Azuma Kagami and Soga Monogatari are often noted. In the Azuma Kagami, Yoritomo shows little hostility toward the brothers, but rather shows generous treatment of them, such as when he proposes to pardon the captured Tokimune and orders respects to be paid after their deaths. On the other hand, in the Soga Monogatari, Yoritomo is continuously portrayed as being hostile towards the brothers, and he is seen ordering severe measures to be taken already before the revenge takes place; however, Yoritomo underwent a major change during his interrogation of Tokimune after the revenge, ultimately praising Tokimune, although this did not change his death penalty.

=== The revenge ===
The descriptions of the revenge have many points in common between Azuma Kagami and Soga Monogatari, but there are also many obvious differences. Both have in common that the scene of the revenge is set in Fujino, but Ide Mansion is not mentioned in the Azuma Kagami. The honorable tales of Kajiwara Kagetoki, Unno Yukiuji and Utsunomiya Tomotsuna, and the fushiki Soga (the part where the brothers lurk on Suketsune in the hunting grounds) are unique to the Soga Monogatari. Furthermore, the Azuma Kagami records the names of the gokenin present at Tokimune's interrogation, whereas the Manabon Soga Monogatari does not. The interrogation of the prostitutes is also unique to Azuma Kagami.

=== Jūbangiri ===
Some of the ten retainers slashed during the jūbangiri differ between Azuma Kagami and Soga Monogatari. Whereas Azuma Kagami records the ten retainers as Tairago Yahei, Aikō Saburō, Kitsukō Kojirō, Katō Ta, Unno Kotarō, Okabe Yasaburō, Hara Saburō, Horifuji Ta, Usuki Hachirō and Uda Gorō, Soga Monogatari records them as Tairago Yahei, Aikō Saburō, Okabe Gorō, Hara Saburō, Gosho no Kuroyago, Unno Kotarō Yukiuji, Katō Tarō, Funakoshitō no Kitsukō Kojirō, Uda Gorō, and Usuki Hachirō. Moreover, although both Uda Gorō and Usuki Hachirō appear in both, Uda Gorō is killed in Azuma Kagami whereas Usuki Hachirō is killed in Soga Monogatari. Additionally, unlike the Kanabon Soga Monogatari, the Manabon Soga Monogatari does not count the order of the victims.

== Soga Monogatari ==
The Revenge of the Soga Brothers was later summarized in Soga Monogatari. In the Edo period, the Revenge of the Soga Brothers became a popular subject in noh, kabuki, and ukiyo-e.

There is a group of works called "Sogamono" in noh, which are based on the Revenge of the Soga Brothers. The earliest example of a Sogamono performance is recorded in Kanmon Nikki, and is called "Soga Gorō Genpuku", and was performed on March 14, 1432.

From around the Enpō era (1673–1681), new Sogamono kabuki was born one after another, and it was especially popular in the 18th century. In Edo, it became a custom to perform a new Sogamono in the New Year, which continued until the Meiji era.

== In popular culture ==
=== Literature ===
- Soga Kyōdai no Mitsumei - Tennō no Shikaku (曾我兄弟の密命―天皇の刺客) by Naoki Takahashi (Bungeishunju)

=== Filmography ===
- Soga Kyōdai Kariba no Akebono (曾我兄弟狩場の曙) (1908) M. Pathe, Shōkichi Umeya
- Soga Jyubankiri (曾我十番斬) (1916)
- Eiroku Soga-tan (永禄曾我譚) (1917) Kobayashi
- Kosode Soga (小袖曽我) (1920)
- Youchi Soga (夜討曽我) (1923) Teikoku Kinema
- Soga (曽我) (1927)
- Nikkatsu Kōshinkyoku Soga Kyōdai (日活行進曲 曽我兄弟) (1929)
- Youchi Soga (夜討曽我) (1923) Makino Film Productions
- Adauchi Nihon Hare Takashi no Maki Soga Kyōdai (仇討日本晴 孝の巻 曾我兄弟) (1931) Teikoku Kinema
- Fuji no Akebono Shōnen Soga (富士の曙 少年曾我) (1940)
- Soga Kyōdai Fuji no Yashū (曽我兄弟 富士の夜襲) (1956) Toei, Yasushi Sasaki

=== TV series ===
- Soga Kyōdai (曾我兄弟) (1959) Nippon TV
- Kusa Moeru (草燃える) (1979) NHK Taiga drama
- The 13 Lords of the Shogun (鎌倉殿の13人) (2022) NHK Taiga drama

=== Manga ===
- Yumegatari Series: Amakakeru Hoshi (夢語りシリーズ 天翔ける星) by Seiko Yuguchi (Akita Shoten)

=== Music ===
- Haruo Minami - "Chōhen Kayō Rōkyoku Soga no Uchiiri"

=== Musicals ===
- Tōken Ranbu - Higekiri Hizamaru Sōki Shutsujin ~SOGA~ by Tōken Ranbu

== Gallery ==
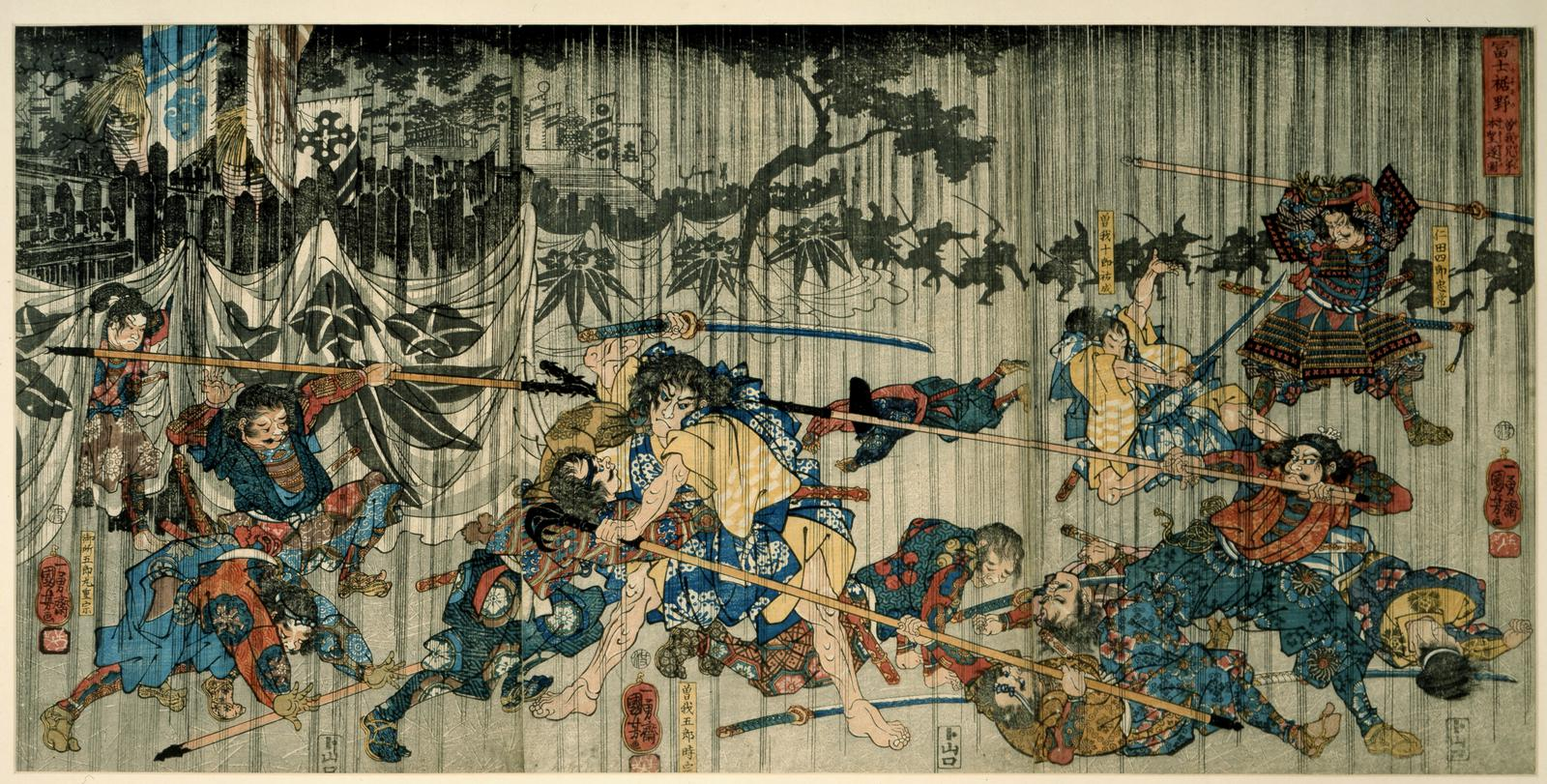
Moor at the Foot of Mt Fuji- Soga Brothers Achieving their Avowed Wish by Utagawa Kuniyoshi

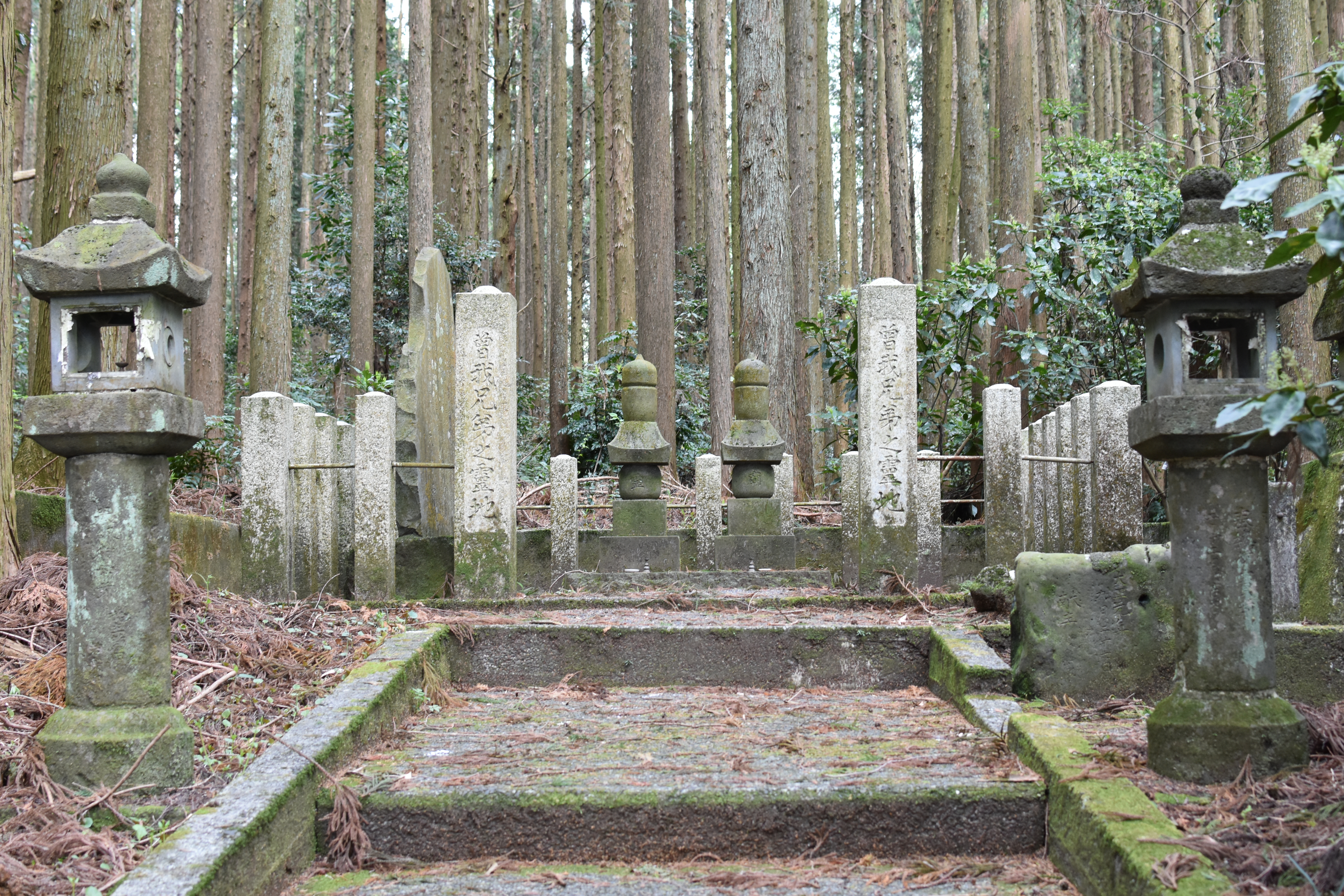
The Soga brothers' grave at Soga Hachiman Shrine, in Kamiide, Fujinomiya, Shizuoka Prefecture

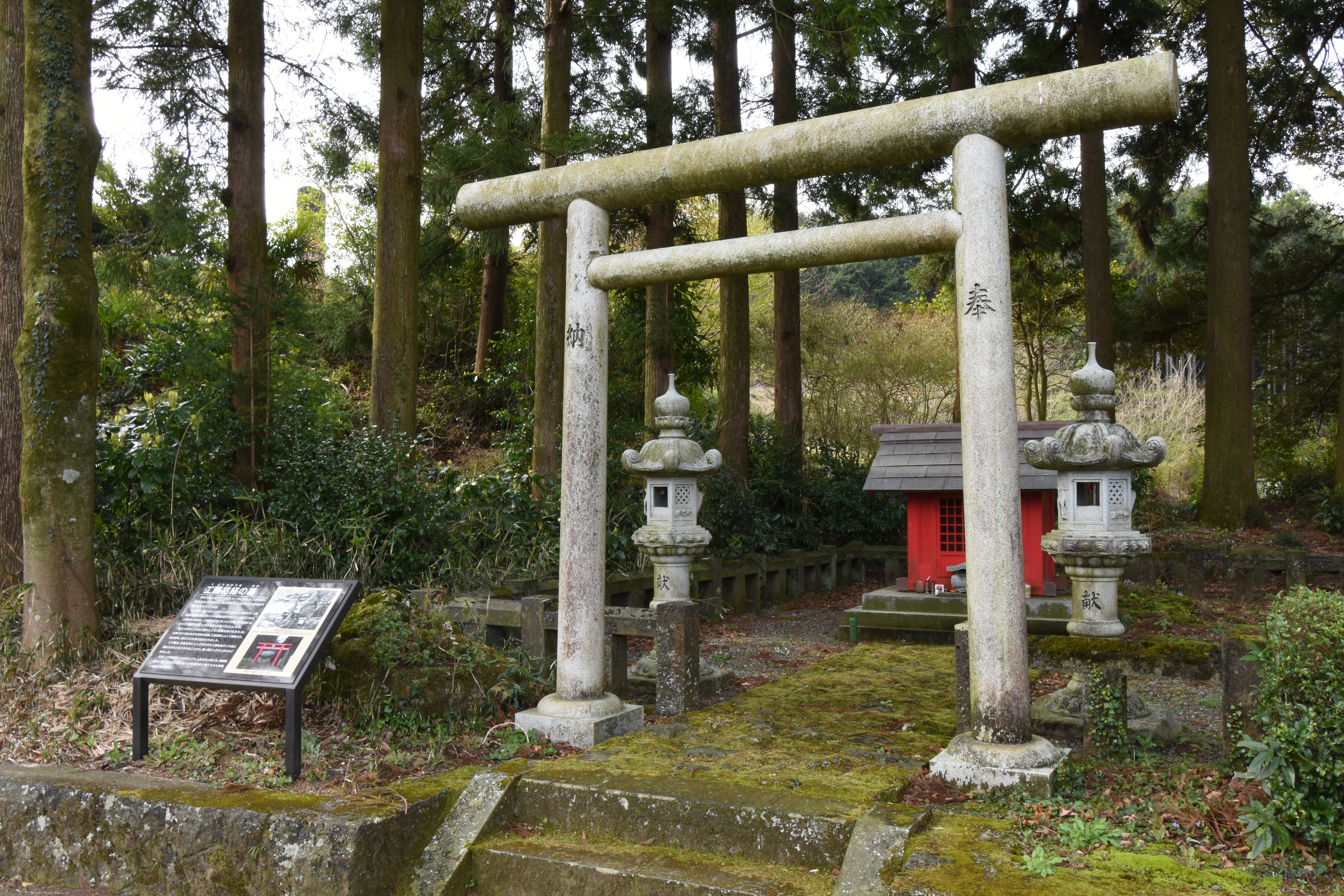
Kudō Suketsune's grave in Kamiide, Fujinomiya, Shizuoka Prefecture

== See also ==
- Fuji no Makigari
- Soga Monogatari
- Soga Tokimune
- Soga Sukenari
