= Kudō Suketsune =

Japanese samurai

Kudō Suketsune 工藤祐経
- Born: 1147
- Died: July 28, 1193 (aged 45–46)
- Occupation: samurai
- Spouse: Mangō Gozen
- Children: Itō Suketoki
- Father: Kudō Suketsugu

Kudō Suketsune (Japanese: 工藤 祐経; 1147 – June 28, 1193) was a Japanese samurai and gokenin in the late Heian and early Kamakura period. He was assassinated during the Revenge of the Soga Brothers incident.

== Life ==
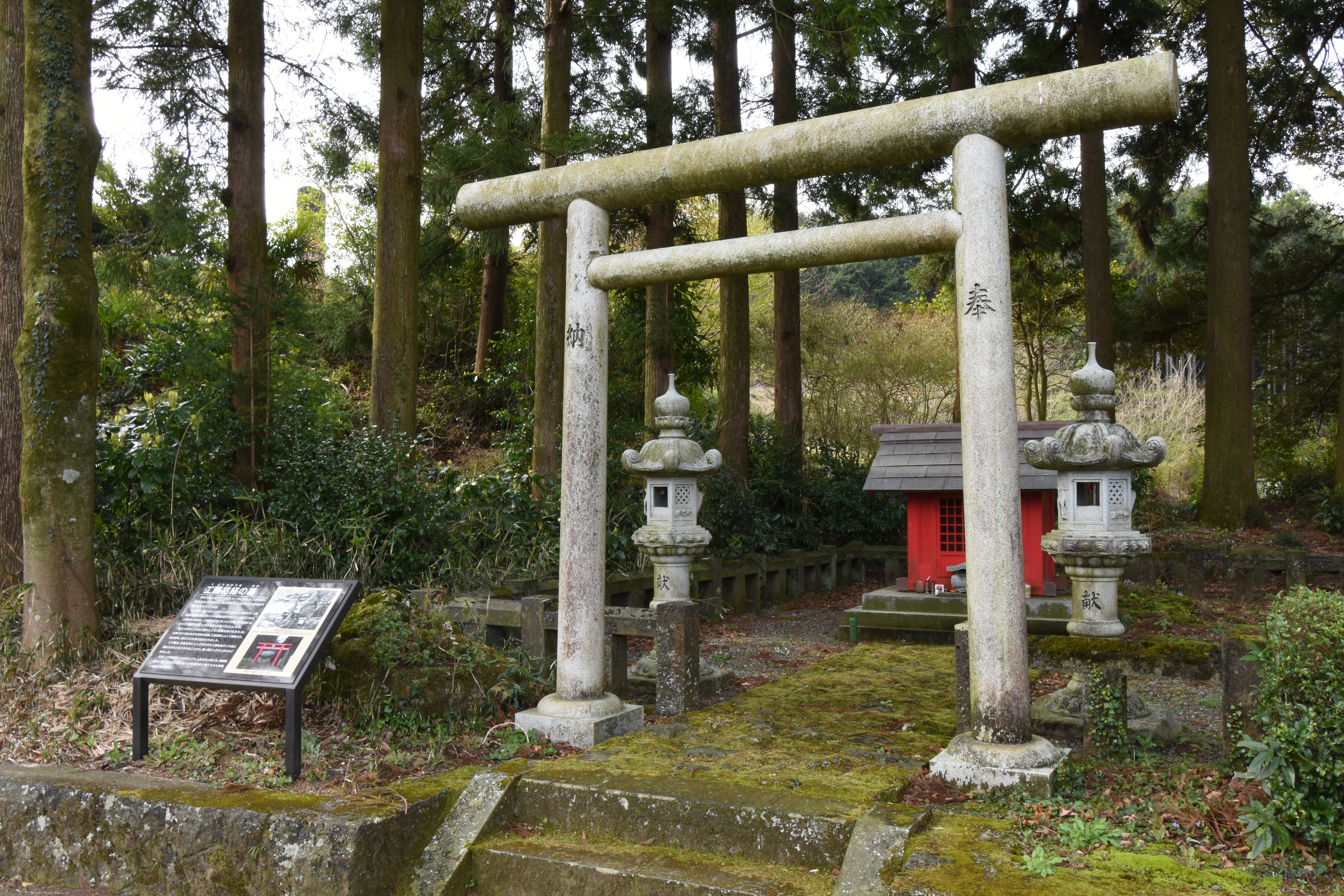
Kudō Suketsune's grave in Kamiide, Fujinomiya, Shizuoka Prefecture

Suketsune was born in 1147 as the son of Kudō Suketsugu.

According to the Azuma Kagami, when Suketsune had his coming-of-age ceremony (genpuku), his father promised that Suketsune would marry Mangō Gozen, the daughter of Itō Sukechika, and Sukechika would become Suketsune's guardian. However, Sukechika did not accept the fact that Suketsune, who was not the eldest son, would inherit the manor, and invaded Suketsune's territory following his father's death. Sukechika also made Mangō Gozen divorce Suketsune.

Suketsune was deeply angered over these events and ordered the assassination of Sukechika. In October 1176, a group of thugs attacked Sukechika, who was hunting in Okuno, Izu Province with his son Kawazu Sukeyasu. The arrow shot at Sukechika missed, and hit Sukeyasu instead, killing him.

In 1193, Suketsune participated in shogun Minamoto no Yoritomo's large-scale hunting event, the Fuji no Makigari, at the foot of Mount Fuji. At midnight on June 28, the final day of the hunting event, two brothers, Soga Sukenari and Tokimune, broke into the building where Suketsune and two prostitutes were resting. The two brothers killed Suketsune to avenge their father's death. Ōtōnai, a shinkan of Kibitsu Shrine in Bizen Province, was also killed in the incident. Sukenari was then killed by Suketsune's retainer Nitta Tadatsune. Tokimune attempted to assassinate the shogun, but was captured by Gosho no Gorōmaru. After the turmoil, Yoritomo questioned Soga Tokimune and considered saving his life, but Suketsune's son Inubusamaru (later Itō Suketoki) cried pleading for justice, and Yoritomo changed his mind and had Tokimune executed. This incident came to be known as the Revenge of the Soga Brothers.

== See also ==
- Revenge of the Soga Brothers
- Kawazu Sukeyasu
- Fuji no Makigari
