= Soga Hachiman Shrine =

Shrine in Shizuoka Prefecture, Japan

Soga Hachiman Shrine 曽我八幡宮
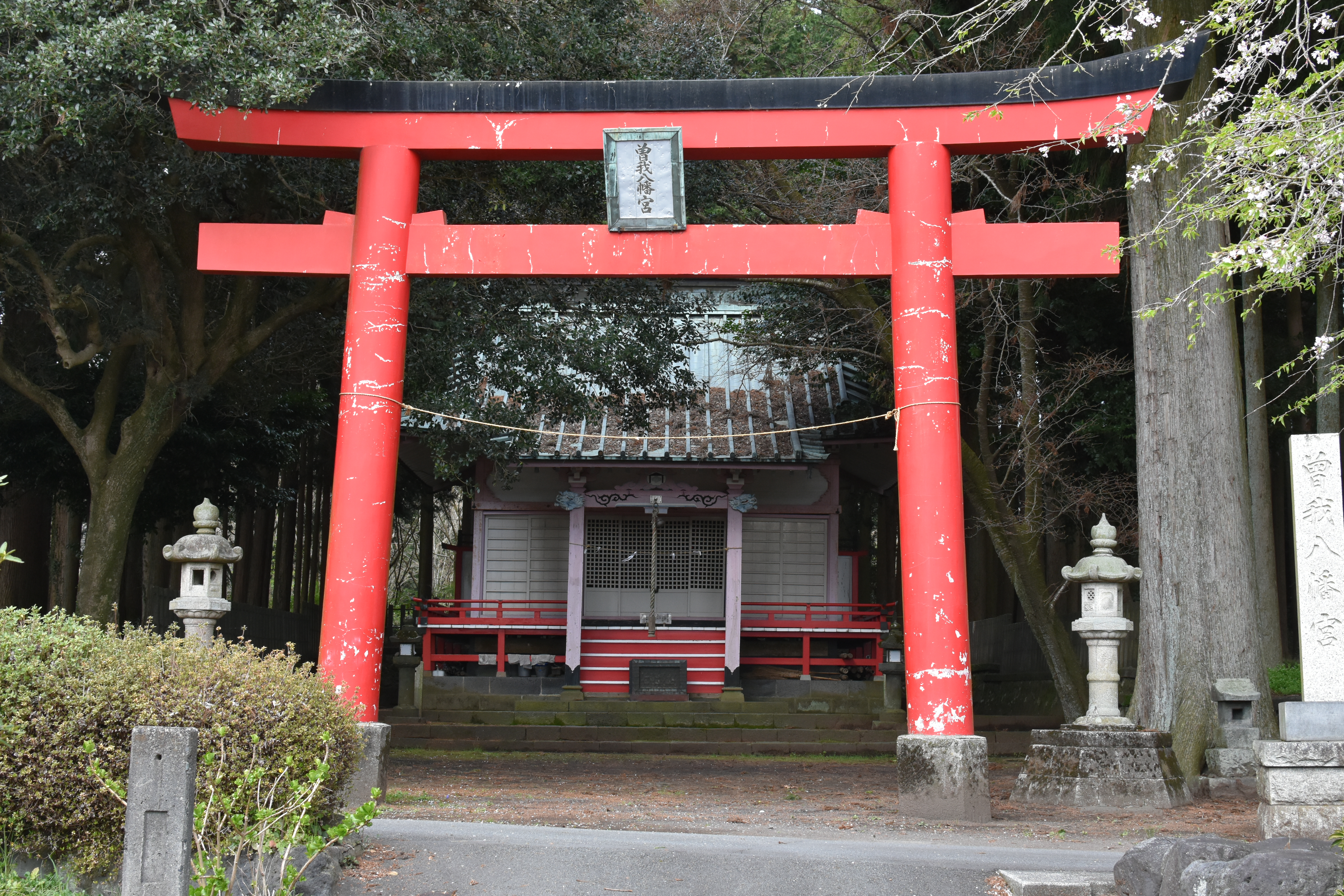
- Soga Hachiman Shrine

- Location within Japan

Religion
- Affiliation: Shinto
- Deity: Emperor Ōjin; Soga Sukenari; Soga Tokimune; Tora Gozen

Location
- Location: 1804, Kamiide, Fujinomiya, Shizuoka Prefecture, Japan
- Interactive map of Soga Hachiman Shrine 曽我八幡宮
- Coordinates: 35°18′15″N 138°35′49″E

Architecture
- Established: November 9, 1197 (legend)

Soga Hachiman Shrine (曽我八幡宮, Soga Hachiman-gū) is a Shinto shrine in Kamiide, Fujinomiya, Shizuoka Prefecture, Japan. The shrine enshrines Emperor Ōjin, Soga Sukenari, Soga Tokimune and Tora Gozen. There are three Soga Hachiman bunsha, or branch shrines, in Fujinomiya.

== History ==
According to Fuji-gun Jinja Meikan, the shrine deities are Emperor Ōjin, Soga Sukenari, Soga Tokimune and Tora Gozen, with statues of the four enshrined in the shrine. On the altar, there are wooden statues of the Soga brothers and Tora Gozen, with an equestrian statue of Emperor Ōjin in the middle.

According to the shrine legend, Minamoto no Yoritomo was moved by the filial piety of the Soga brothers during the Revenge of the Soga Brothers incident. Yoritomo is said to have sent Hatakeyama Shigetada to order Watanabe Mondo, a master craftsman in the area, to enshrine the spirits of the brothers in 1197. The shrine is said to have been built by Mondo. The statue of Emperor Ōjin is said to have been carved by Mongaku, who was an associate of Yoritomo during his exile, and the statues of the Soga brothers were made by Tamba Hōgen. Similar legends are recorded in other shrine legends, regional geographies, and other sources. It is said that the history of Soga Hachiman Shrine was in the hands of the Kimoto family, who were the guardians of the shrine, but it has since been lost, and only an inscription based on the legend remains. The inscription says that the shrine was established on November 9, 1197.

According to Suruga Shiryō (1861), a history of the shrine was handed down by the Ide clan, and states that the shrine's statues were given to Minamoto no Yoritomo by Mongaku. It states that Yoritomo ordered Niwa Yoshitaka to make statues of the Soga brothers. This history, whose date of production is unknown, titled "Soga Hachiman-gū Enki," is still extant. According to Soga Hachiman-gū Enki, Yoritomo ordered the shrine to be built by Okabe Yasutsuna.

In the Edo period, Soga Monogatari became popular in kabuki and other forms of theater. An exhibition was opened in Edo commemorating the Soga brothers, with the statues of the Soga brothers and other items related to them on display. The proceeds of the exhibition were used to perform a restoration work on the shrine.

The shrine is currently located in the Kamiide section, but until the Edo period, it belonged to Kariyado village.

== Bunsha shrines ==
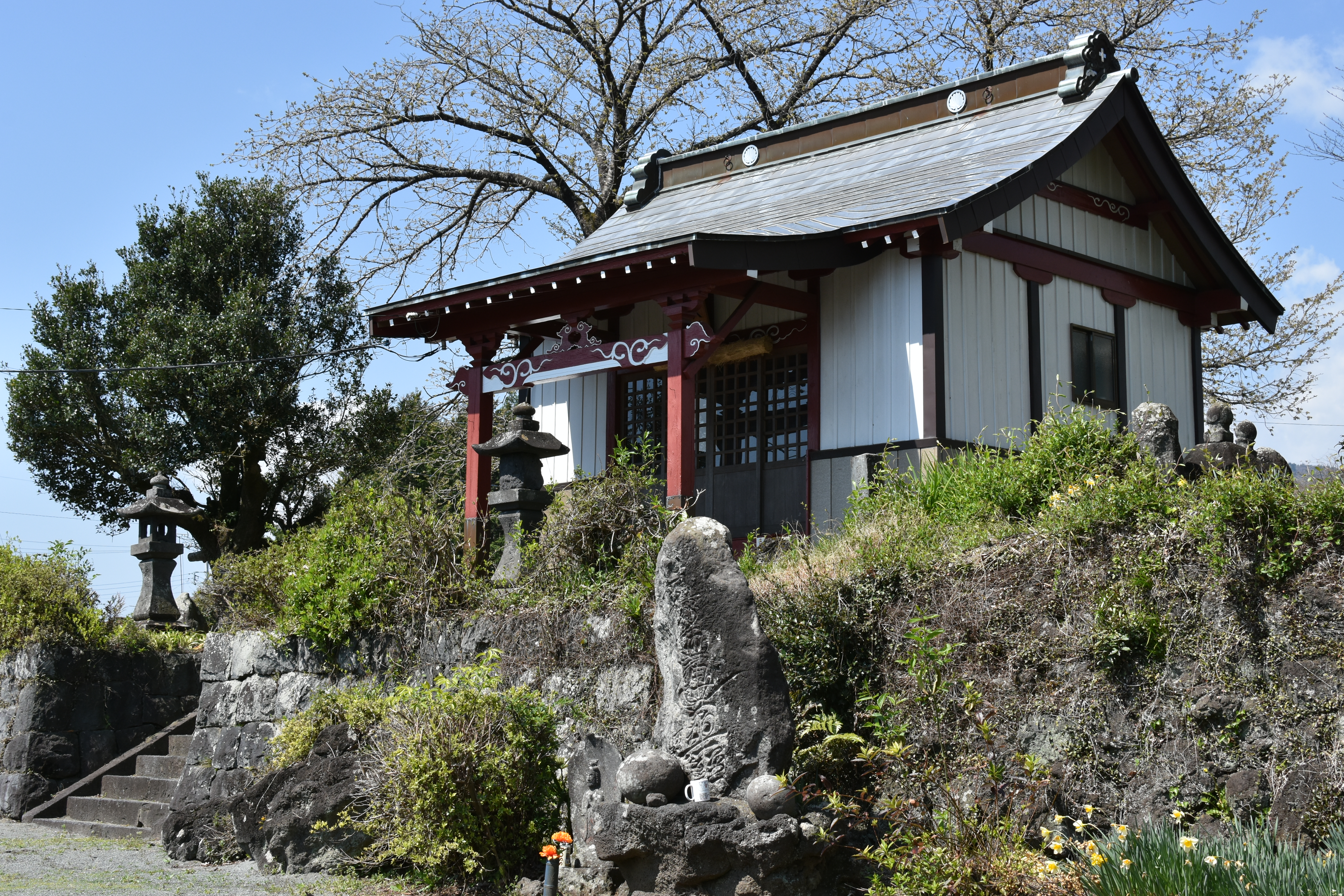
Bunsha Soga Hachiman Shrine in Nakaiide

There are several other Soga Hachiman shrines in Fujinomiya. There is a Soga Hachiman Shrine in Nakaiide, Kitayama, Fujinomiya, which was divided (bunrei) as a bunsha shrine from the original shrine in Kamiide in the Edo period. There is another one in Asashiki, Kitayama. There is also a Soga Hachiman Shrine in Inogashira, which is also known as Washitaka Hachiman Shrine. It is said that when the Soga brothers were killed, an eagle and a hawk (washi and taka in Japanese) flew away with the brothers' vital organs and buried them in Inogashira.
