= Fujino, Shizuoka =

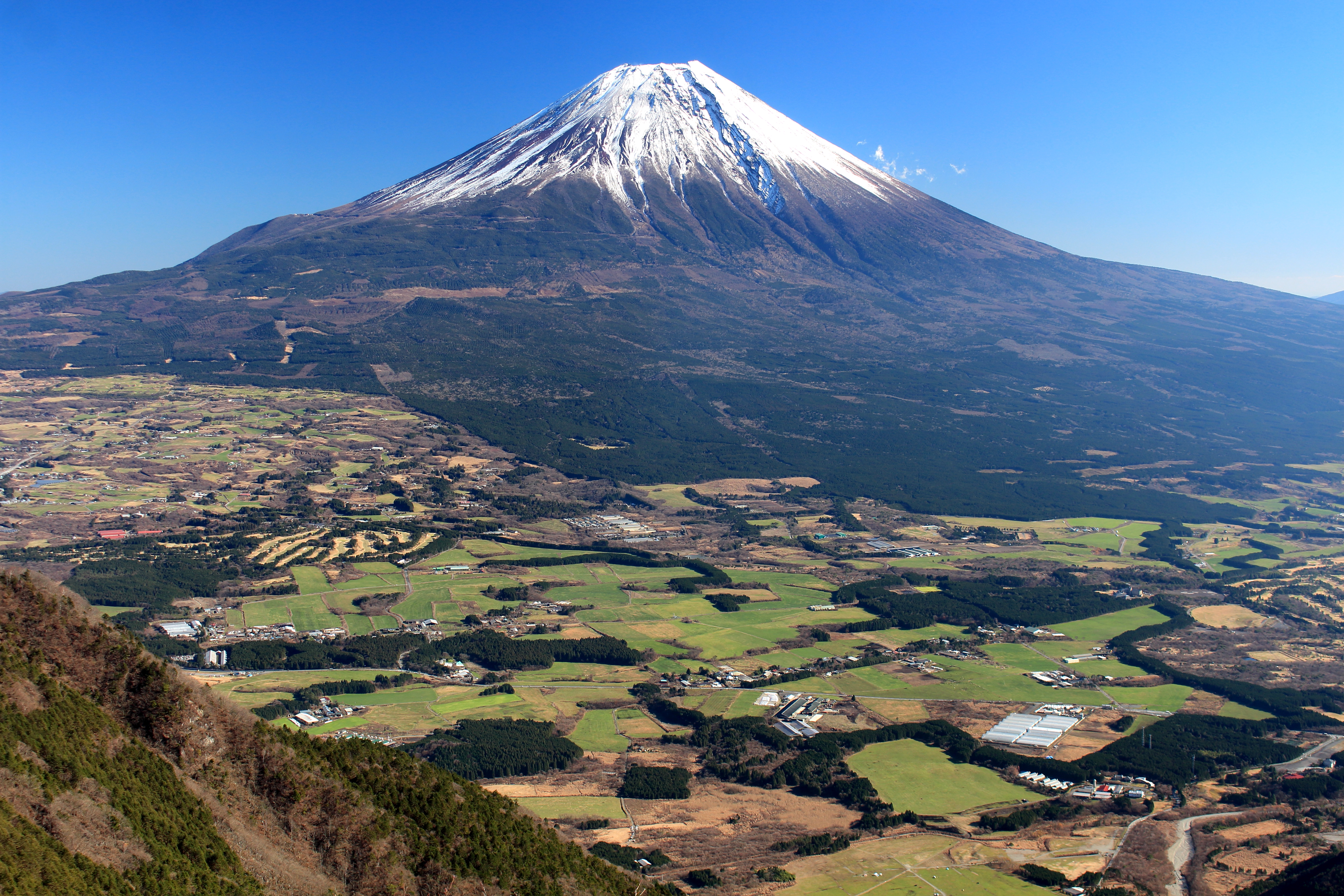
Fujino, located at the southwestern foot of Mount Fuji

Fujino (富士野) is a region covering the southwestern foot of Mount Fuji, located in Fujinomiya, Shizuoka Prefecture, Japan. Known as the location of the 12th century hunting event Fuji no Makigari, it is also the stage of the Revenge of the Soga Brothers incident.

== Overview ==
Fujino is an ancient place name at the southwestern foot of Mount Fuji, which can be seen in the Kamakura period historical chronicle Azuma Kagami. It is particularly known as the hunting grounds of Fuji no Makigari, a grand hunting event arranged by shogun Minamoto no Yoritomo in 1193. The hunters spent the majority of the time in Fujino, from June 15 to July 7. Azuma Kagami states "We are staying at the Fujino Goryokan after hunting in Aizawa" on May 15, 1193, and "hunting in Fujino" on May 16. The Revenge of the Soga Brothers incident occurred on May 28 in Fujino during the hunting event. Many people came to hear the news after the incident had occurred. It is said that a massive horde of countless gokenin and other influential people were crowding Fujino.

Historical materials disseminated on the subject of hunting in Fujino include Soga Monogatari and Fujino Ōrai, which was widely used in education as Ōraimono (primary education textbooks created mainly in the form of letters from the late Heian period to the early Meiji era).

== In Azuma Kagami ==
The specific range of ancient Fujino is unknown, but Azuma Kagami writes about the acting governor of Suruga Province Tachibana Tōshige, who lost in the Battle of Hachita, stating that "[his] severed head is exposed in Ide, right beside Fujino" on October 14, 1180. From this, it has been concluded that Ide (present-day Kamiide, Fujinomiya) is located beside Fujino. Furthermore, the place name "Mawari Fujino" appears in Azuma Kagami, and it was through Fujino that led to this battleground on October 13, 1180.

"Kamino's Goryokan in Fujino" appears in the text on May 28, 1193, stating that Kamino (present-day Kamiide) is located in Fujino. In addition, "Kamino" in "Kamino-no-michi and Kasuga-no-michi" appearing on October 14, 1180, is also the same place.

Shinchō Kōki states the following:

At the foot of [Mount] Fuji, in Kaminogahara and Ideno, all of the pages were breaking in horses at their heart's content.

— Ōta Gyūichi, Shinchō Kōki, Volume 15

From this, "Kaminogahara" has been identified as present-day city of Fujinomiya. In addition, "Fujino hunting, Soga brothers' nightly revenge" can be seen in Kamakura Hōjō Kyudaiki, but this description is based on Azuma Kagami and Shōgunki.

== In Soga Monogatari ==
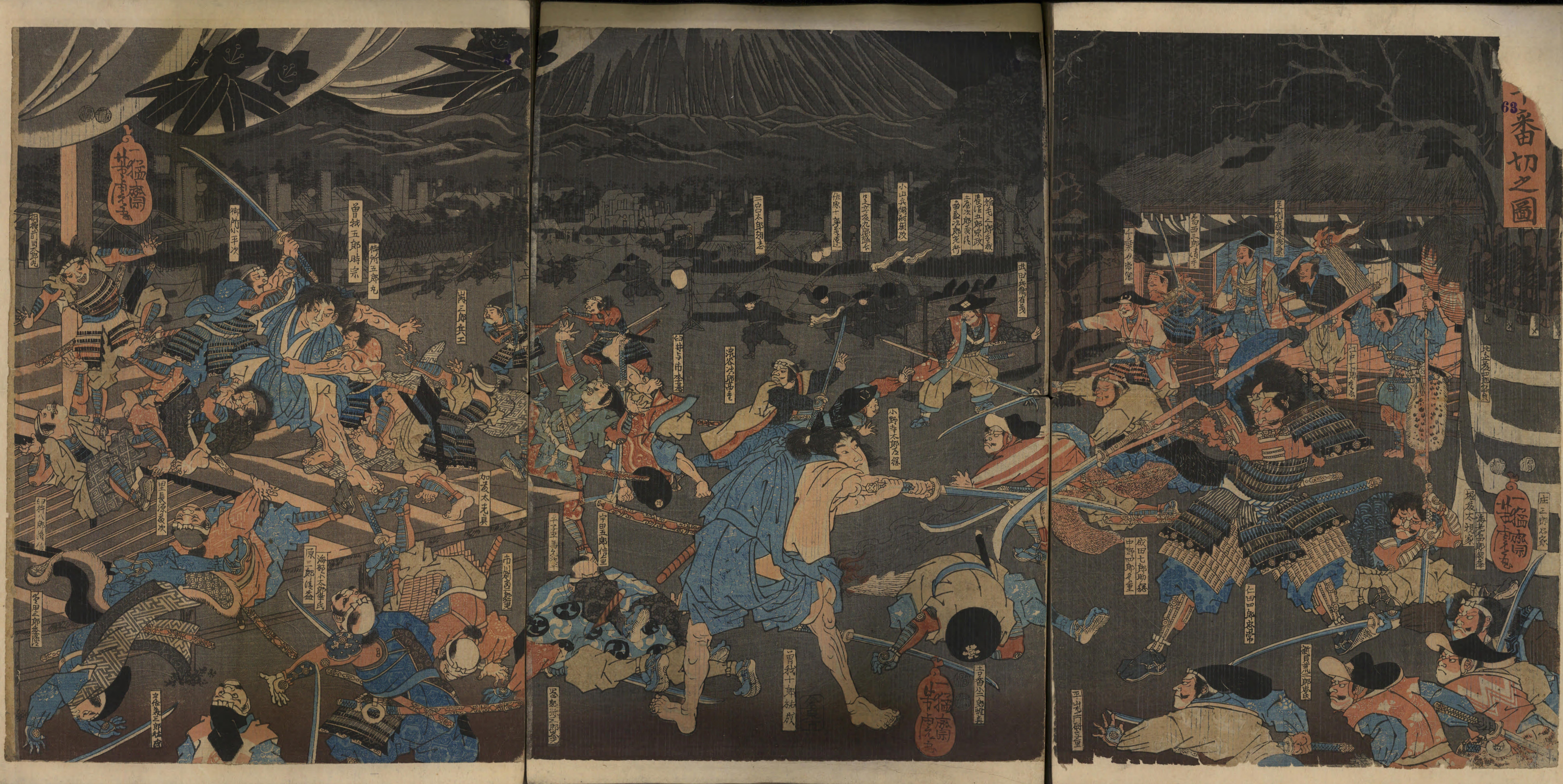
Scene of the Revenge of the Soga Brothers in Fujino

In Manabon Soga Monogatari, there is a scene in which Minamoto no Yoritomo says "there are many hunting grounds in eastern Japan, but there is no place more famous than Fujino." In Kanabon Soga Monogatari it is written that "With too few beaters, you have no business in vast Fujino." The vastness of Fujino and the scale of Fuji no Makigari are extoled in Soga Monogatari.

In addition, "Ide Mansion, foot of Fujino, Suruga Province" and "Ide Mansion, foot of Fujino" appear in Manabon Soga Monogatari. The Ide Mansion was located in Fujino, and it is described as the place of death of the Soga brothers.

In Unpo Irohashū, there is "Ide Mansion Soga", and in Horyaku Kanki, "Suketsune was killed at Ide Mansion." In this way, various historical texts link the Ide Mansion and Soga together. On the other hand, in Azuma Kagami, the Ide Mansion does not appear in the part describing the Revenge of the Soga brothers.

== In Sogamono ==
In kōwakamai, a group of songs called Sogamono are based on Soga Monogatari. In "Ichiman Hako'ō", there is a line saying "This life ends at Ide Mansion, aimed at 38 degrees, at last fulfilling the vow, leaving immortal fame to the house", with Ide Mansion appearing as the place of revenge. In "Kosode Soga", it says, "Upon leaving for Fujino, [they] will pay [their] mother a farewell-visit", beginning with a depiction of the Soga brothers saying farewell before their revenge in Fujino. The song continues, "Fujino is, according to rumor, a place of untimely snow", and the mother gives Sukenari a kosode in consideration of the cold weather in Fujino. In addition, there is a depiction of Tokimune being excited about the revenge saying, "[I shall] travel to Fujino and die fighting to my heart's content."

In "Youchi Soga", Hatakeyama Shigetada and Wada Yoshimori are seen as the supporters of the Soga brothers, and there is a part where Yoshimori states "leaping flames shall fly from Fujino tonight" advising that the revenge should take place that night. The Ide Mansion also appears in the song, saying, "Along with the croaking of the frogs, [I] leave the Ide Mansion."

== Fujino Ōrai ==
Fujino Ōrai is a historical document in which Fuji no Makigari in Fujino is communicated via letters. The subject matter also includes the Revenge of the Soga Brothers incident. Also known as the mother of Ōraimono, it has been the subject of many citations and has also been used as an educational textbook. Fujino Ōrai is also known outside of Japan, and it was introduced as a Japanese textbook in the Joseon period Gyeongguk daejeon. Although it is unknown when Fujino Ōrai was created, it has existed since the Nanboku-chō period.

The writings of the books are concentrated between 1486 and 1564, and the titles of all the existing books are "Fujino Ōrai" or "Mikari Fujino Ōrai". In Fujino Ōrai, the Revenge of the Soga Brothers incident took place at the Ide Mansion, and its location is given as "Yabute Mansion, Higashimiya-no-Hara, south of Fuji, Suruga Province". In addition, as mentioned above, the description of Fuji no Makigari in Fujino is also seen in Unpo Irohashū, but it is pointed out that this story was taken from Fujino Ōrai.

== See also ==
- Fujinomiya, Shizuoka
- Fuji no Makigari
- Revenge of the Soga Brothers
