= Tora Gozen =

Japanese woman in the Kamakura period

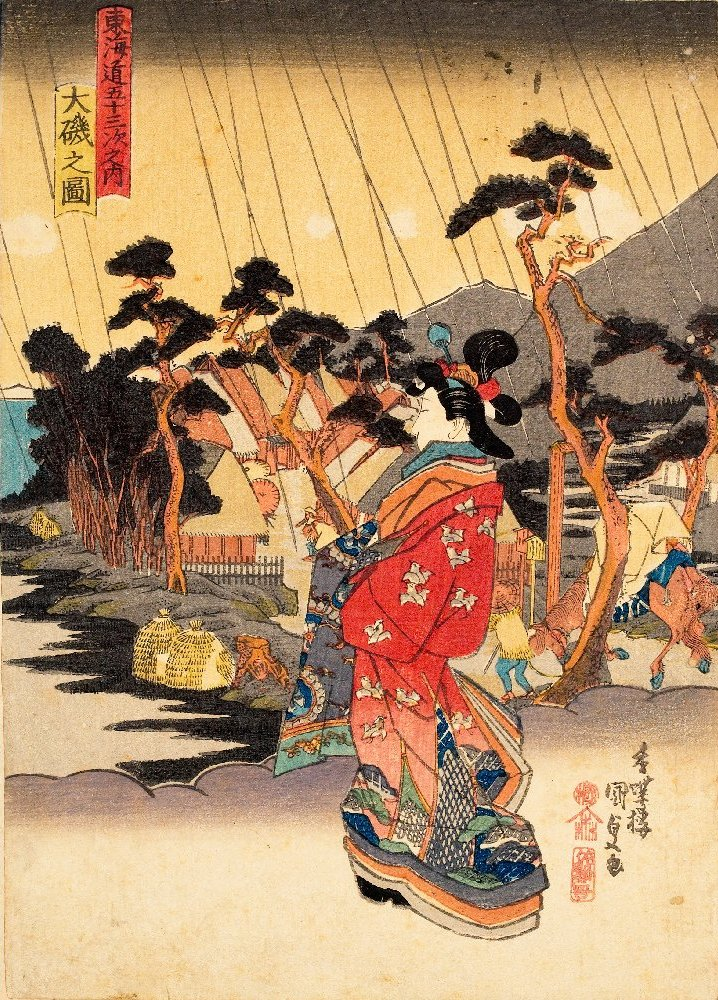
Tora Gozen in Tora-ga-ame (Tora's rain) by Kunisada

Tora Gozen (虎御前) was a Japanese prostitute of the early Kamakura period. She was the concubine of Soga Sukenari, one of the perpetrators of the Revenge of the Soga Brothers incident. She became widely known as a character in numerous kabuki and jōruri Sogamono plays which are based on the incident. Additionally, she is also known as Ōiso no Tora, Otora-san and Torajo.

== Life ==
It is said that Tora Gozen was a prostitute at Ōiso-juku in Sagami Province (in present-day Ōiso, Kanagawa Prefecture).

According to Soga Monogatari, she became the concubine of Soga Sukenari and remained faithful to him thereafter. It is said that she was 19 years old when the Revenge of the Soga Brothers incident took place, during which Sukenari and his younger brother Tokimune were killed.

After Sukenari's death, it is said that she became a nun in Hakone and traveled the lands. She visited sacred places in Kumano and other places holding memorial services before returning to Soga village for the first anniversary of the brothers' deaths. After this, it is said that she carried the brothers' bones on her neck to Shinano Province where she left the bones at Zenkō-ji temple.

It is said that Tora Gozen stayed in Yamaguwa (in present-day Sōsa, Chiba Prefecture) at the Oniō family home, the home of the Oniō brothers who are said to have served the Soga brothers, for seven years, praying for the repose of the Soga brothers' souls. The graves of Tora Gozen and the Soga brothers remain at the Oniō family cemetery in Yamaguwa, and an uchikake said to have been used by Tora Gozen is preserved there.

According to Soga Monogatari, Tora Gozen died at the age of 64.

== Legacy ==
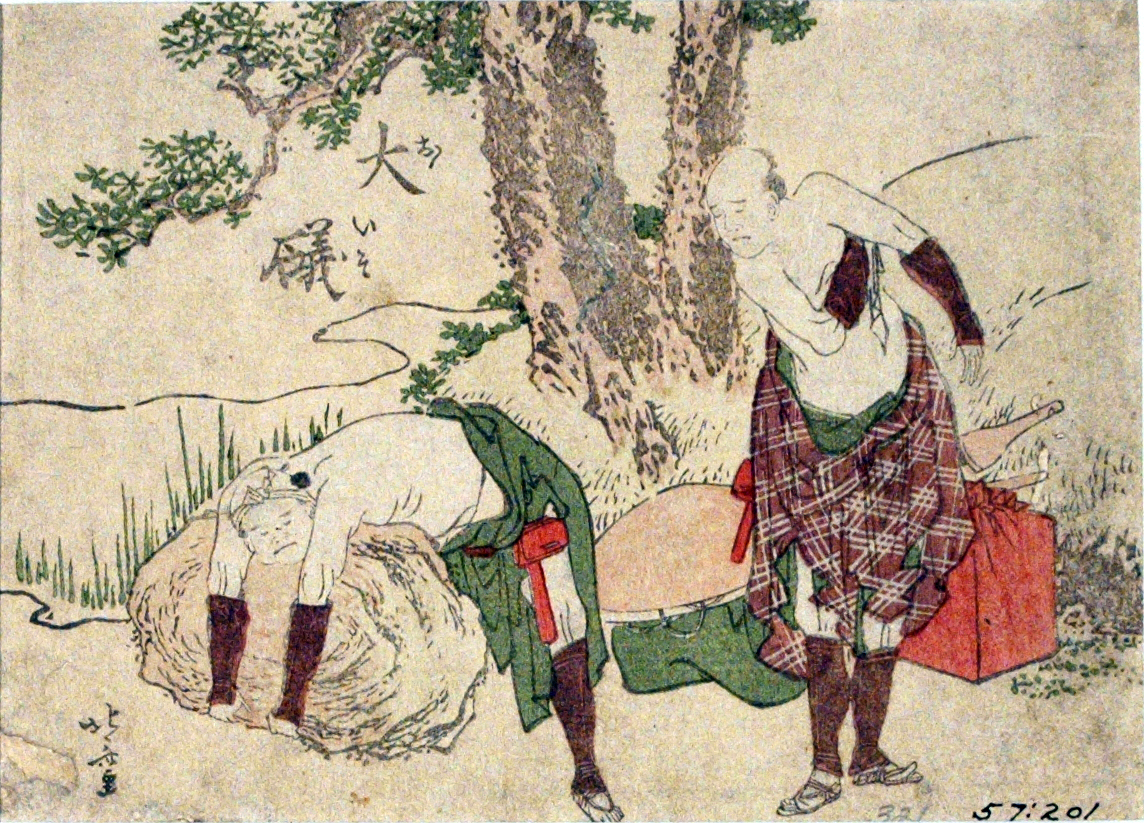
Traveler attempting to lift a Tora-ga-ishi by Hokusai

On May 28, the day of the Revenge of the Soga Brothers incident, it is said that Tora-ga-ame (Tora's rain) would fall, which is a metaphor of Tora Gozen's tears.

In the Edo period, many kabuki and jōruri Sogamono plays, in which Tora Gozen appears, were created. The story was also written in senryū poetry, and Tora Gozen's story was popularized.

There are stones called Tora-ga-ishi in Japan which are said to be stones on which Tora Gozen rested during her travels. It is believed that a traveling miko called Tora or Tōro, who practiced Mikkyō around these stones, became linked to Soga Monogatari.

== Historicity ==
Regarding Tora Gozen's historicity, it is believed that there was a traveling woman called Tora who told the story of Soga Monogatari, and that her name became fixed in the legend of Soga. Therefore, it has been challenged whether or not Tora Gozen was a real person of the Kamakura period. It is also believed that the name of a group of advocates that propagated Soga Monogatari was Tora, which later became a character in the story.

== In popular culture ==
=== Filmography ===
- Soga Kyōdai Fuji no Yashū (曽我兄弟 富士の夜襲) (1956) Toei film, Hizuru Takachiho as Tora Gozen

=== TV series ===
- Kusa Moeru (草燃える) (1979) NHK Taiga drama, Tokuko Watanabe as Tora Gozen
