= Sukeroku =

Kabuki play

Sukeroku 助六由縁江戸桜く
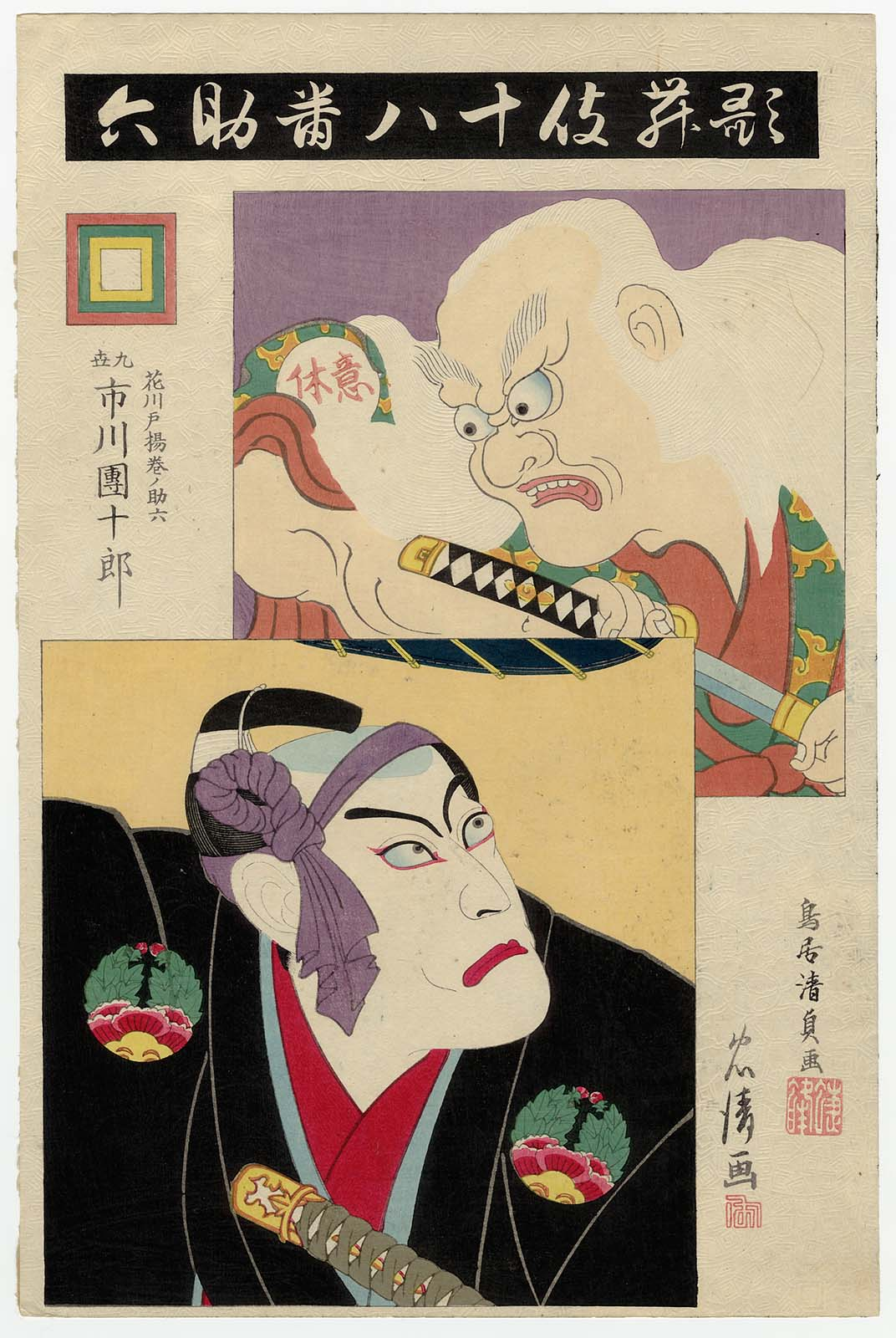
- A print of the play designed by Torii Tadakiyo and Torii Kiyosada (of the Torii school). The actor playing Sukeroku is Ichikawa Danjūrō IX.
- Original language: Japanese
- Written by: Tsuuchi Jihei II and Tsuuchi Han'emon
- Characters: Sukeroku, Agemaki, Ikyû, Manko, Shinbei
- Subject: "blood revenge"
- Setting: Yoshiwara

Premiere
- Date: 1713
- Place: Japan

Sukeroku (助六由縁江戸桜) is a play in the Kabuki repertoire, and one of the celebrated Kabuki Jūhachiban ("Eighteen Great Plays"). The play is known in English as Sukeroku: The Flower of Edo.

The play is strongly associated with the Ichikawa Danjūrō family of actors.

== Plot ==
Events take place in Yoshiwara, a pleasure district of present-day Tokyo. Agemaki is a courtesan who is frequented by Sukeroku (who turns out to be samurai Soga Gorō). Sukeroku is continually looking for fights. An old samurai called Ikyū arrives and tries to subtly persuade Agemaki away from Sukeroku. Sukeroku does not succeed in provoking Ikyū to draw his sword. A saké-seller named Shimbei shows up, and Sukeroku picks a fight with him, but Shimbei reveals himself to be Soga Jyūrō (Sukeroku's elder brother) in disguise. Sukeroku explains to his brother (and later his mother) that he tries to provoke people into drawing their sword. If the sword turns out to be Tomokirimaru (their fathers sword), the person who holds the sword is probably the killer of their father and revenge can be exacted.

Ikyū tries to convince the brothers to join him. To demonstrate his power he hacks a leg of an incense burner. Thus revealing that his sword is in fact Tomokirimaru and he is Iga Heinaizaemon, an enemy of the family, and their father's killer. Quite often the play ends here, although there are versions where Sukeroku kills Ikyū.

== History ==
The work is derived from The Tale of the Soga Brothers.

== In popular culture ==
The play is still regularly performed.

The Ichikawa family secured its control over the play in 1832 using the title Sukeroku Yukari Edo Zakura. As the play is extremely popular, other families have developed their own versions, such as Sukeroku Kuruwa no Momoyogusa performed by the Onoe Kikugorô line of actors.

In Junichiro Tanizaki's novel, "Diary of a Mad Old-Man", Sukeroku is referred to five times at the beginning of Chapter I.

Soga Gorō/Sukeroku is one of the playable fighters in the 2001 Xbox's exclusive fighting game Kabuki Warriors, alongside other famous Kabuki characters (such as Sato Tadanobu from Yoshitsune Senbon Zakura, Kumedera Danjo from Kenuki, Taira no Kagekiyo from Kagekiyo, among others).

In Kageki Shojo!!, one of the most recurring characters in both the manga and the anime, the legendary Kabuki actor Shirakawa Kaou XV (one of Kabuki's greatest tachiyaku, known for being a renowned aragotoshi (i.e. his main specialty is the aragoto style) and the father of Sarasa Watanabe, protagonist of Kageki Shojo!!) is known for his outstanding portrayal of Soga Gorō/Sukeroku (which is considered his best role of his entire repertoire of successful Kabuki roles).

== Translation ==
The play was translated into English by James R. Brandon as part of a book containing five Kabuki plays. The book has been reprinted by the University of Hawaii Press (in 1992). The book is also part of the UNESCO Collection of Representative Works.

== External references ==
- Holly Blumner and Naoko Maeshiba; "Sukeroku: A History." in 101 Years of Kabuki in Hawai'i; pages 42–44.
- Constantine Vaporis; "A Hero for the Masses: The Kabuki Play Sukeroku: Flower of Edo (1713)" in Voices of Early Modern Japan.
- Tamotsu Watanabe; Kabuki 101 monogatari; in Japanese
