= Soga Sukenari =

Japanese samurai

Soga Sukenari 曾我祐成
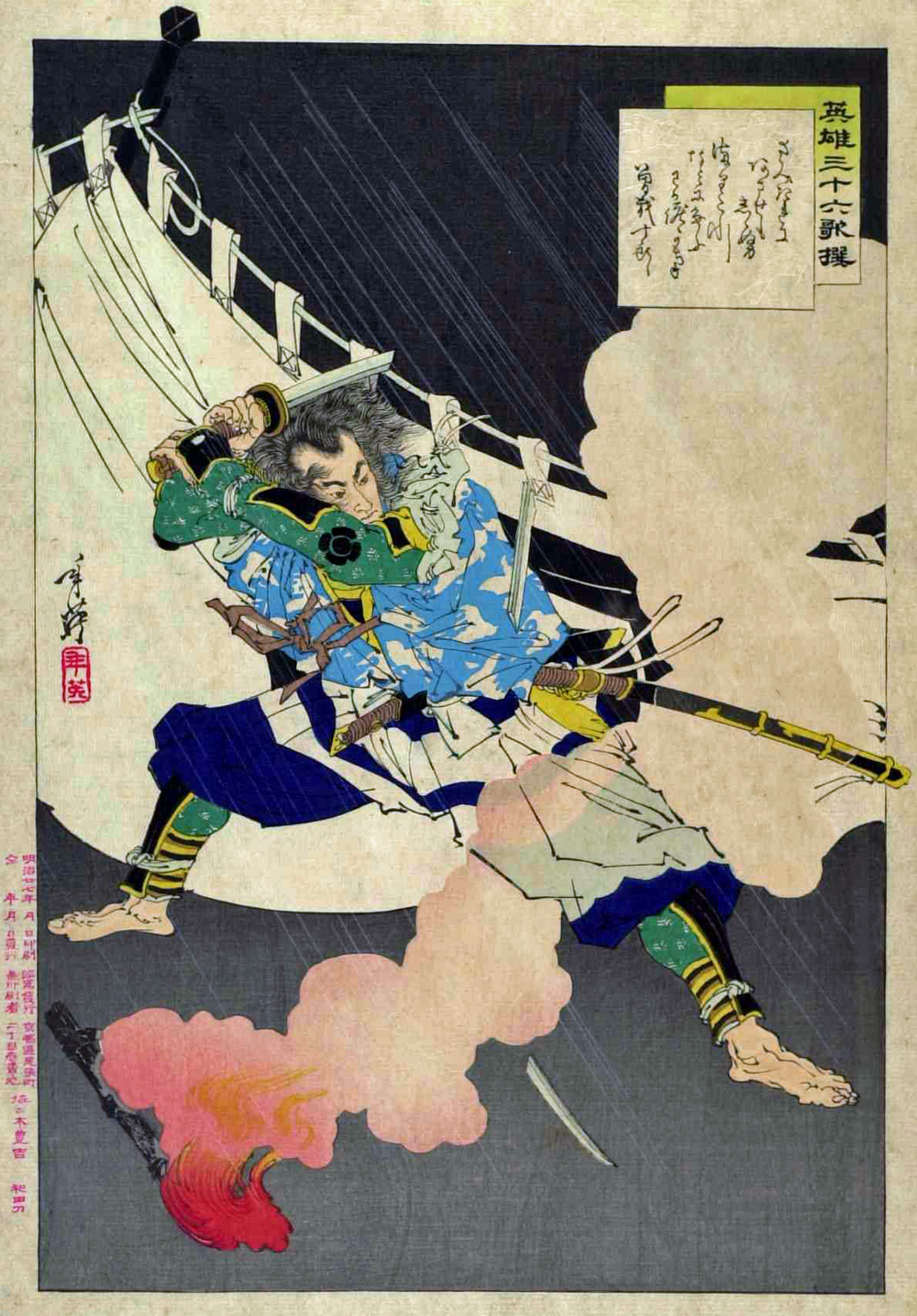
- Eiyū Sanjyūrokkasen: Soga Jūrō by Toshihide Migita
- Born: 1172
- Died: 28 June 1193 (aged 20–21)
- Other names: Jūrō, Ichimanmaru
- Occupation: Samurai
- Spouse: Tora Gozen (concubine)
- Father: Soga Sukenobu (stepfather); Kawazu Sukeyasu

Soga Sukenari (Japanese: 曾我祐成, 1172 - June 28, 1193) was a Japanese samurai in the early Kamakura period. He and his brother Soga Tokimune are known for being the perpetrators of the Revenge of the Soga Brothers incident. He is a central character in noh and kabuki Sogamono plays, which are based on the revenge. He is also known as Soga Jūrō.

== Life ==
=== Early life and family ===
Sukenari was born Kawazu Ichimanmaru (河津 一萬丸) in 1172, the son of Kawazu Sukeyasu, a gōzoku in Izu Province. He had a younger brother, Hako'ō (later Tokimune). Through his father, the eldest son of Itō Sukechika, he descended from the Itō clan, a branch of the Kudō clan, and through Fujiwara no Korekimi (727–789), the Fujiwara clan, a powerful family of Japanese regents and court nobility.

In 1176, when Ichimanmaru was four years old, his biological father, Kawazu Sukeyasu, was killed by Kudō Suketsune, who accidentally killed him during an assassination attempt on Ichimanmaru's grandfather Itō Sukechika. Suketsune and Sukechika had been quarreling over the inheritance of land. After Sukeyasu's death, Ichimanmaru's mother remarried to Soga Sukenobu, the lord of Soga Manor in Sagami Province (currently Odawara, Kanagawa Prefecture). Sukenobu became the stepfather of Ichimanmaru and Hako'ō, who thus became members of the Soga clan. The Soga clan was founded by Soga Sukeie, an eighth generation descendant of Taira no Yoshifumi, and they descended from the Kanmu Heishi line of the Taira clan through the Chiba clan, making them direct descendants of the 8th century Emperor Kanmu. Shortly after Sukenobu became his stepfather, Ichimanmaru had his coming-of-age ceremony (genpuku) with Sukenobu as his guardian (eboshi-oya). Ichimanmaru received the imina name Sukenari, having Sukenobu bestow the kanji "suke" (祐) in his name upon him. Sukenari, along with his younger brother, are said to have mourned for their biological father.

The Soga brothers had a difficult upbringing, and, as the elder brother, Sukenari took over the Soga family. Later, he lived under the protection of Hōjō Tokimasa, his uncle by marriage whose late wife was the daughter of Sukechika. Tokimasa would be the greatest supporter of the Soga brothers in the midst of their hardships, and the Soga brothers never forgot their father's vengeance.

According to Soga Monogatari, a prostitute from Ōiso-juku called Tora Gozen became Sukenari's concubine and remained faithful to him thereafter.

=== Revenge and death ===
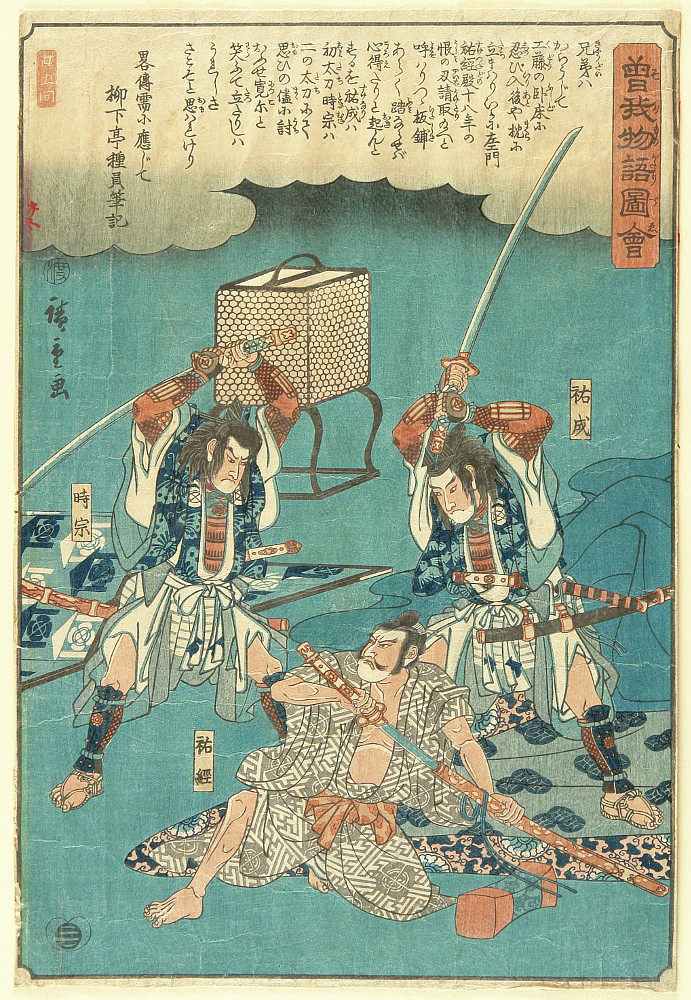
Soga brothers killing Kudō Suketsune by Utagawa Hiroshige

In June 1193, the Soga brothers, and their father's killer Suketsune, participated in the shogun Minamoto no Yoritomo's grand hunting event, called the Fuji no Makigari, at the foot of Mount Fuji. On June 28, 1193, the last night of the Fuji no Makigari, the brothers set off to kill Suketsune; according to Soga Monogatari, Sukenari was armed with a shakudō tachi sword; and Tokimune with a hyōgogusari tachi sword and a copper sasuga sword. Together, the brothers killed Suketsune, thus fulfilling their vow. They also killed a priest called Ōtōnai who had been accompanying Suketsune. The brothers then began a bloodbath and defeated ten samurai, which became known as jūbankiri ("slashing of ten"), and, according to Soga Monogatari, cut so many that the number of victims is unknown. After this, Nitta Tadatsune attacked Sukenari and the two began fighting. According to Soga Monogatari, Sukenari managed to cut Tadatsune's forearm and the hair on his temple; however, Sukenari was getting tired and his sword slipped from his hand, forcing him to retreat, after which Koshibagaki no Kage almost hit Sukenari's elbow causing him to lose control. It is said that Tadatsune took advantage of this, and cut Sukenari from the left shoulder all the way under the right breast, killing him. As his last words, Sukenari is said to have said, "Where is Gorō [Tokimune]? Sukenari has been defeated by the hands of Nitta Shirō. If you have not been wounded yet, go and present yourself to Lord Kamakura [Minamoto no Yoritomo] unwaveringly."

After Sukenari had been killed, Tokimune stormed into the shogun's mansion attempting to attack the shogun, but was apprehended by Gosho no Gorōmaru. Tokimune was executed the next day at the request of Suketsune's son, Itō Suketoki.

After the incident, Sukenari's concubine Tora Gozen was interrogated but was later released because she found innocent of any involvement. According to Soga Monogatari, she was 19 years old at the time of Sukenari's death. It is said that she held a memorial service for Sukenari, sacrificed a grey horse that he had given her and became a nun in Hakone. She is then said to have traveled around Japan holding memorial services before returning to Soga village for the first anniversary of the brothers' death. After this, it is said that she carried the brothers' bones on her neck to Shinano Province where she left the bones at Zenkō-ji temple.

The youngest brother of Sukenari was invited to Kamakura and joined the elder brothers in death by committing suicide by hanging. A biological brother of the Soga brothers, Hara Kojirō, was executed for this incident as a collective punishment for Minamoto no Noriyori losing his position and due to his connection to the incident.

== Graves ==
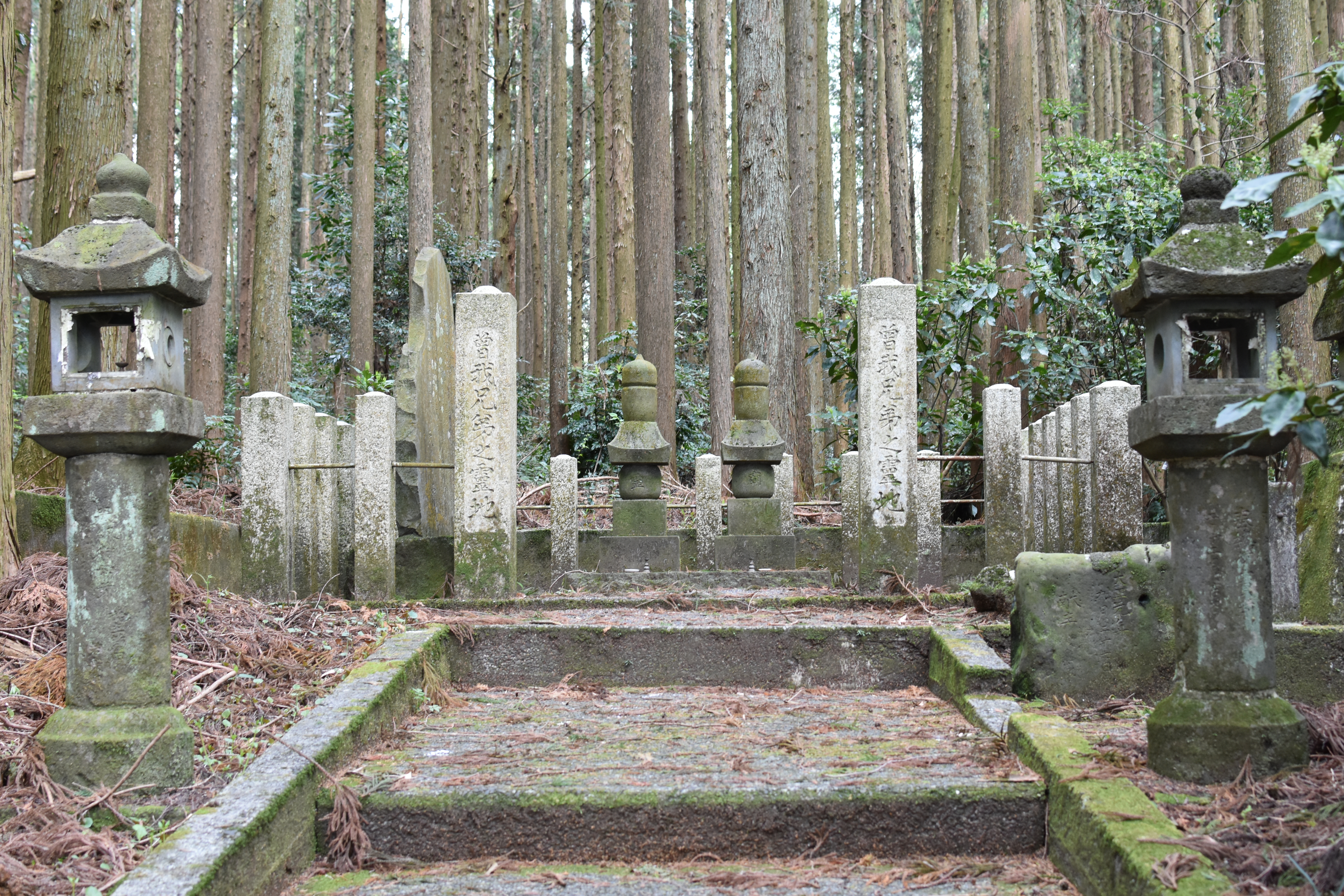
The Soga brothers' grave at Soga Hachiman Shrine, in Kamiide, Fujinomiya, Shizuoka Prefecture

There are the graves of Sukenari and Tokimune at Soga Hachiman Shrine in Kamiide, Fujinomiya, Shizuoka Prefecture. Nearby, there is the site of Nitta Tadatsune's cantonment, which is said to be the place where Sukenari was killed. There is another set of graves located at Jōsen-ji temple of the Soga Manor (in present-day Sogayatsu, Odawara, Kanagawa Prefecture) where the brothers grew up. These two gravesites are the two original gravesites of the Soga brothers. However, there are numerous other graves located around Japan dedicated to the Soga brothers' spirits, which are seen as goryō (vengeful ghosts).

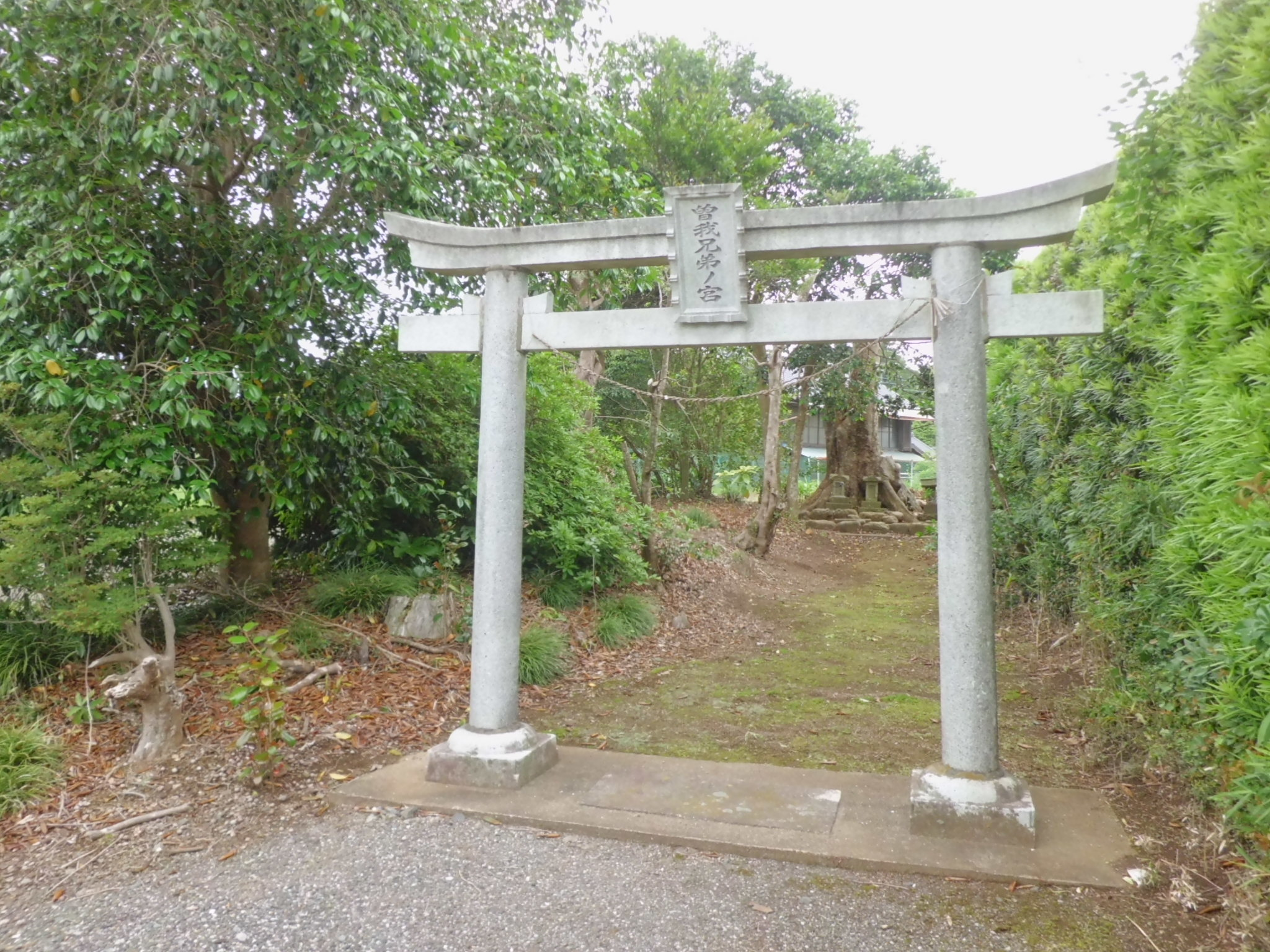
Soga Kyōdai no Miya Shrine in Yamaguwa, Sōsa, Chiba Prefecture

There are graves dedicated to the Soga brothers at Ikō-in temple in Yamaguwa, Sōsa, Chiba Prefecture. It is said that two brothers called Oniōmaru and Danzaburō served Tokimune's father Sukeyasu, and Danzaburō protected Sukenari and Oniōmaru protected Tokimune. The two are said to have continued their service under the Soga brothers after Sukeyasu was killed. It is said that after the Soga brothers were killed, the Oniō brothers buried the Soga brothers' bones in Yamaguwa, the Oniō brothers' home. The graves dedicated to the Soga brothers remain at the Oniō family cemetery. Furthermore, there is also the grave of Sukenari's concubine Tora Gozen at the same gravesite, and it is said that she stayed at the Oniō family home in Yamaguwa for seven years, praying for the repose of the Soga brothers' souls. An uchikake said to have been used by Tora Gozen is preserved there.

== Family ==
- Father: Kawazu Sukeyasu
- Stepfather: Soga Sukenobu
- Mother: Yokoyama Tokishige's daughter
- Brothers:
  - Soga Tokimune
  - Hara Kojirō
  - Risshi
- Stepbrothers:
  - Soga Suketsuna
- Concubine: Tora Gozen

== In popular culture ==
=== Filmography ===
- Soga Kyōdai Fuji no Yashū (曽我兄弟 富士の夜襲) (1956) Toei, Soga Sukenari portrayed by Chiyonosuke Azuma

=== TV series ===
- Kusa Moeru (1979) NHK Taiga drama, Soga Sukenari portrayed by Kiyotaka Mitsugi
- The 13 Lords of the Shogun (2022) NHK Taiga drama, Soga Sukenari portrayed by Kazuya Tanabe

=== Theater ===
Soga Sukenari appears in noh and kabuki in the Sogamono plays, which are based on the Revenge of the Soga Brothers incident.

- "Soga Kyōgen" (曽我狂言) is a story about the Revenge of Soga brothers.
- "Soga Moyōtateshi no Gosho-zome" (曽我綉侠御所染) is a story about the Soga brothers and the protagonist Gosho no Gorozō.

=== Art ===
Soga Sukenari has been the subject of several ukiyo-e paintings. The most famous include the following:

- Eiyū Sanjū Rokkasen: Soga Jūrō (1894) by Toshihide Migita
- Soga Gorō and Soga Jūrō (1860) by Utagawa Kunisada
- Dai Nihon Meisho Kagami; Tokyo Kaika Kyoga Meisho; Kokoku Nijushiko; Shinryu Nijushi Toki: Soga Gorō and Soga Jūrō by Tsukioka Yoshitoshi

== Gallery ==
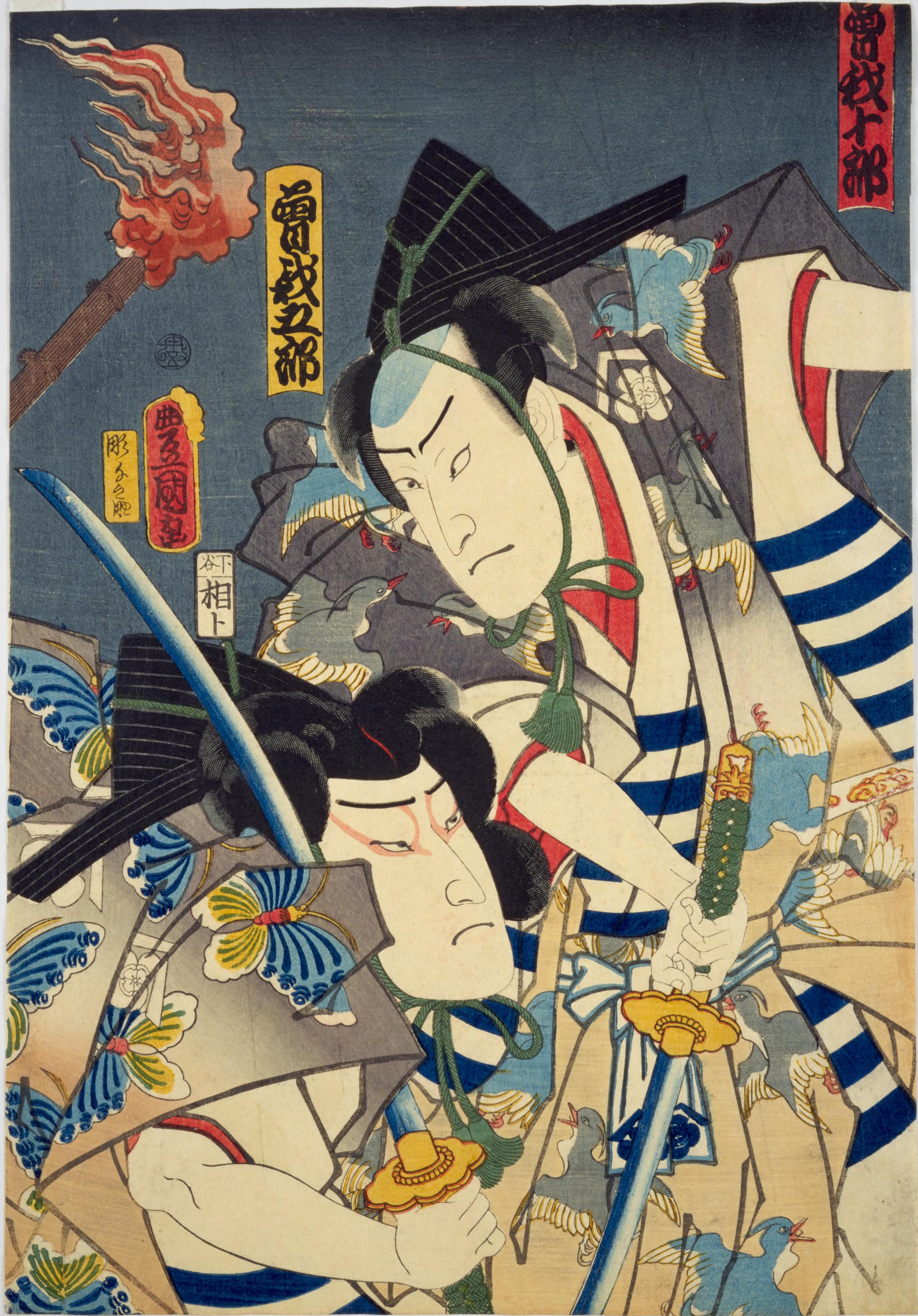
Soga Gorō and Soga Jūrō by Utagawa Kunisada

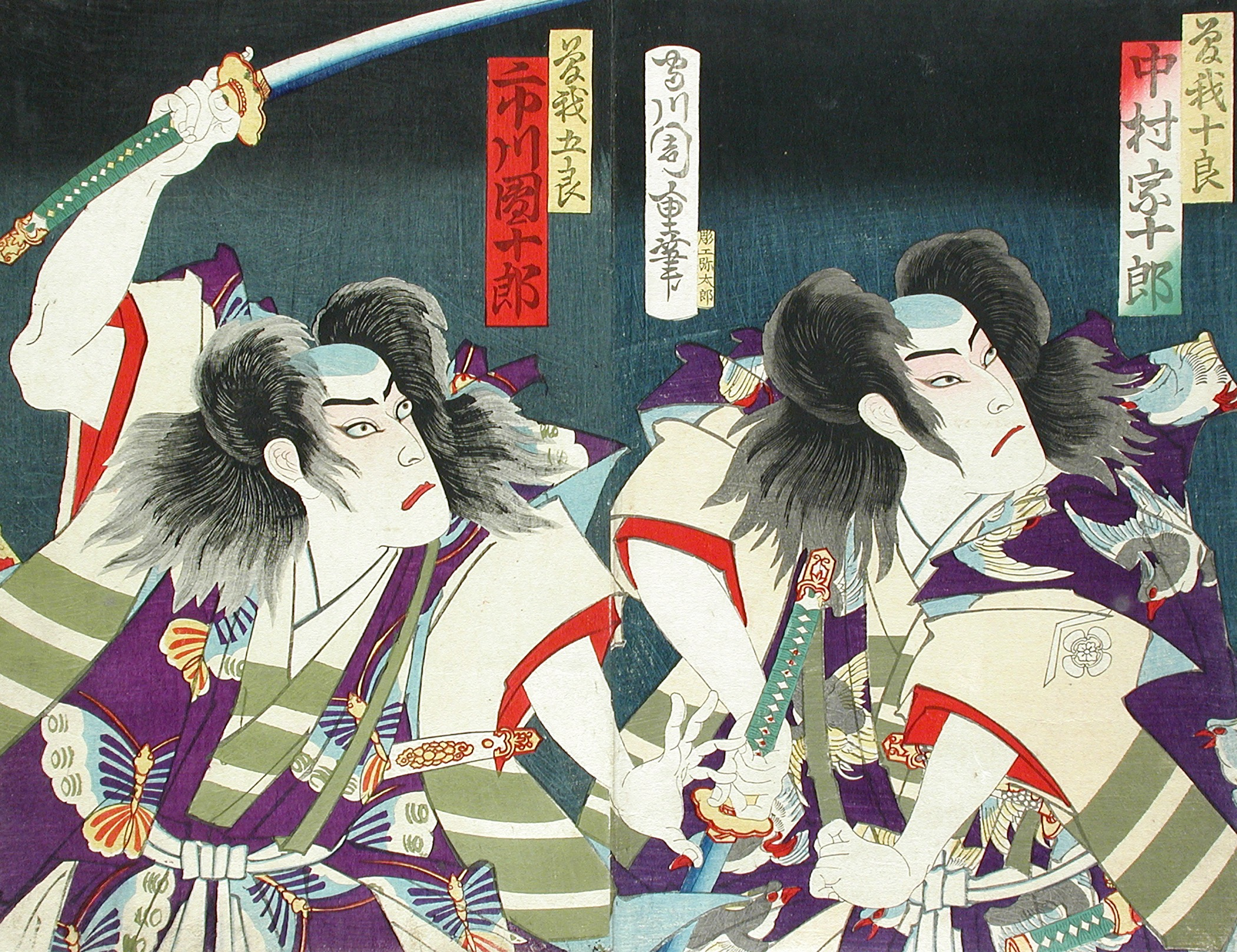
Soga Gorō and Soga Jūrō by Tsukioka Yoshitoshi

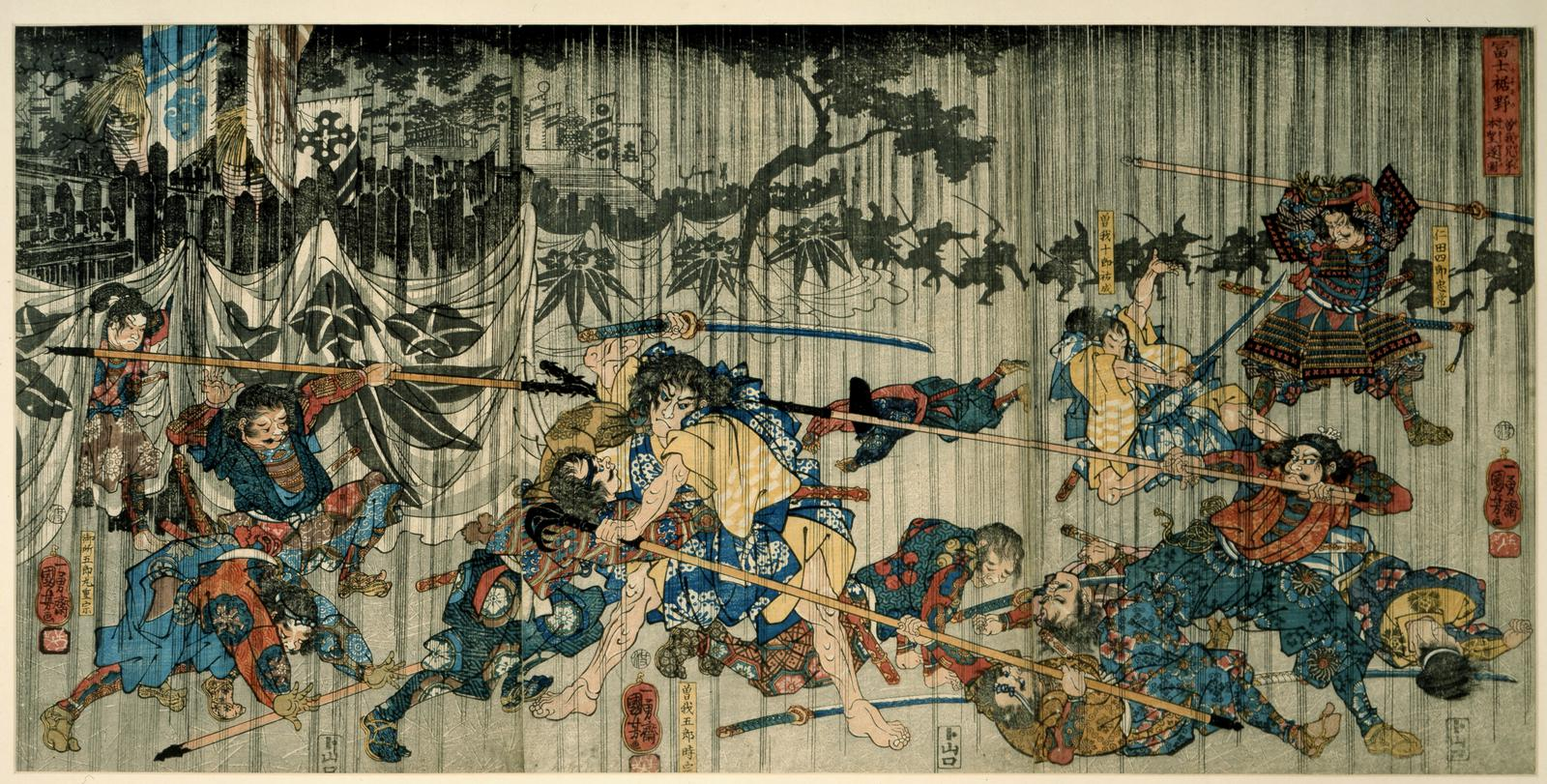
Moor at the Foot of Mt Fuji- Soga Brothers Achieving their Avowed Wish by Utagawa Kuniyoshi

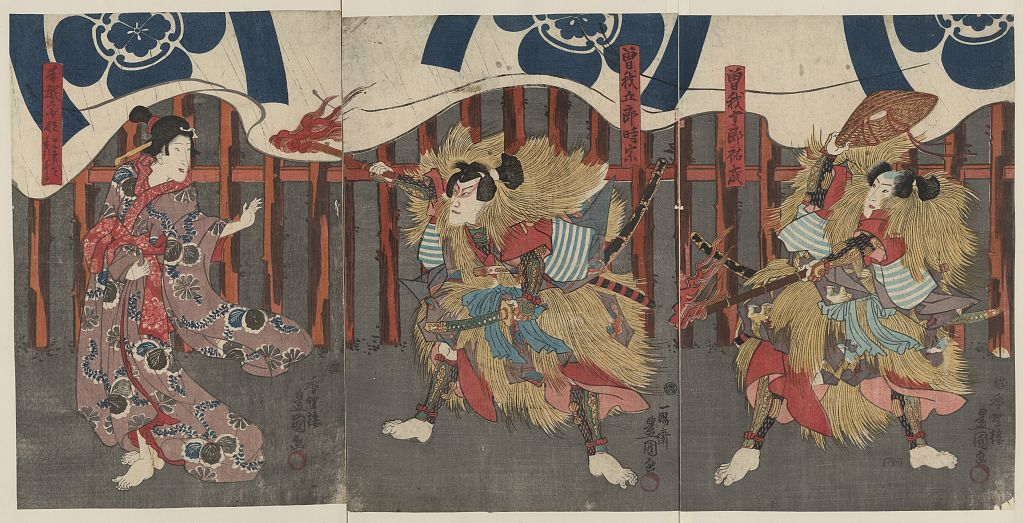
Soga Sukenari and Tokimune with Tegoshi no Sukuna by Utagawa Kunisada

== See also ==
- Revenge of the Soga Brothers
- Soga clan (Sagami Province)
