= Nitta Tadatsune =

Nitta Tadatsune 仁田忠常
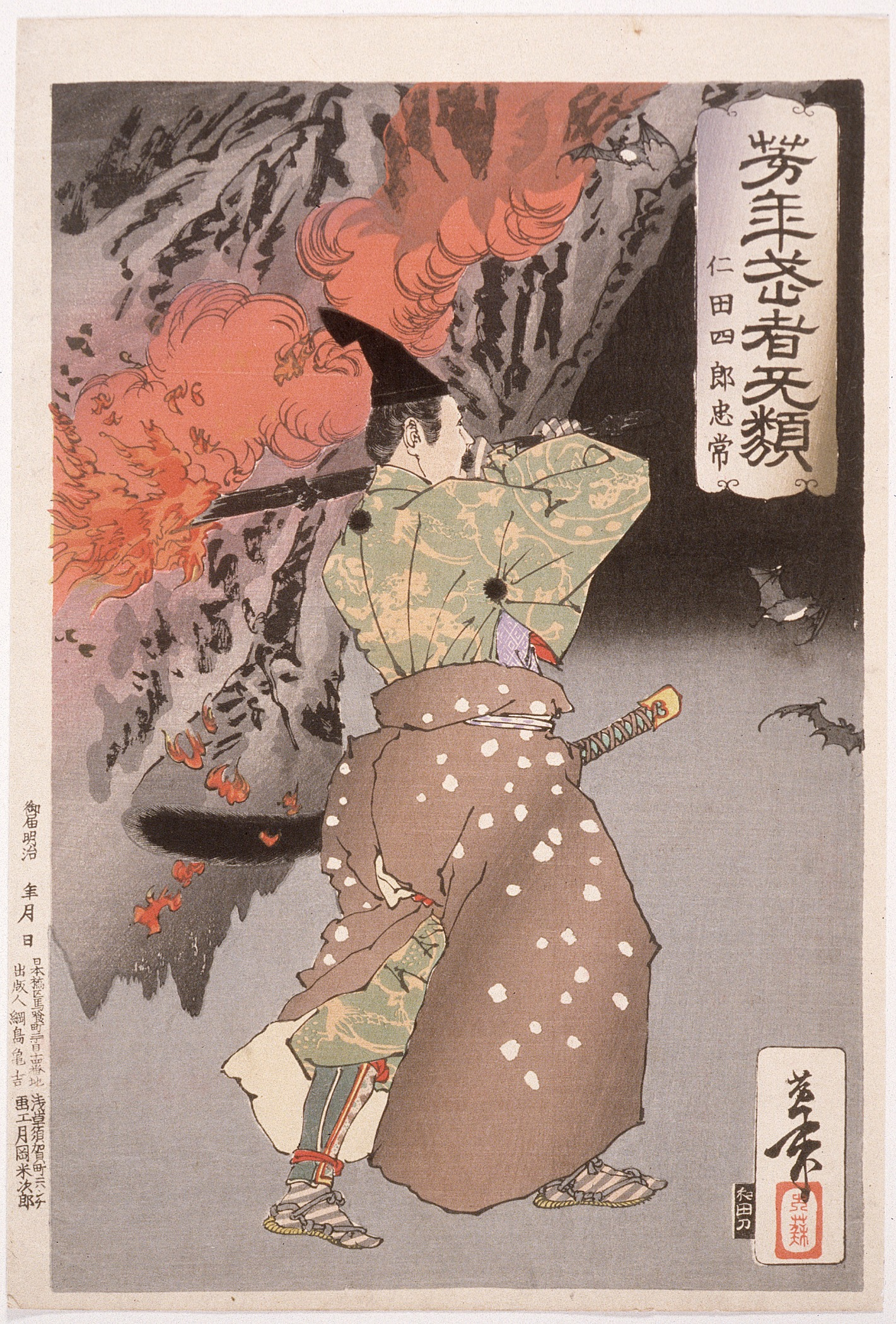
- Nitta Shirō Tadatsune Entering a Cave with a Torch by Yoshitoshi
- Born: 1167
- Died: October 12, 1203 (aged 37)
- Other names: Shirō
- Occupation: samurai lord

Nitta Tadatsune (仁田 忠常, 1167 – October 12, 1203) was a Japanese samurai lord and retainer of the Kamakura shogunate in the late Heian and early Kamakura period. He served as a close retainer to shoguns Minamoto no Yoritomo and Yoriie. He is known for killing Soga Sukenari during the Revenge of the Soga Brothers incident. In The Tale of the Heike he is called Nitan no Tadatsune. He is also called Shirō, his azana.

== Life ==
Nitta Tadatsune was born in 1167. His parents are not known but he was from the Kanō clan (a branch of the Kudō clan), descending from the Nanke House of the powerful Fujiwara clan.

Tadatsune was originally a resident of Nitta, Izu Province (present-day Kannami, Shizuoka Prefecture).

In 1180, he joined Minamoto no Yoritomo's troops, and played an active part in the punitive expedition of the Taira clan in the West. In March 1185, he moved to various parts of Chinzei (Saikaidō) serving Minamoto no Noriyori. He also participated in the conquest of Mutsu Province during the Battle of Ōshū.

In June 1193, during the grand hunting event, Fuji no Makigari, held by shogun Minamoto no Yoritomo, Tadatsune acted as an archer for Yoritomo. On June 28, 1193, the Soga brothers killed Kudō Suketsune at the event, an incident known as the Revenge of the Soga Brothers. The brothers began a bloodbath at the event, defeating ten samurai and slashing many others. Tadatsune joined the fight late, criticized the poor strategy of the samurai and told them to separate the two brothers and surround them. Tadatsune attacked Soga Sukenari, who told him that he was hoping to fight with him as he was yet to meet a worthy enemy. Although Sukenari managed to cut Tadatsune's forearm and the hair on his temple, Sukenari was getting tired and his sword slipped from his hand, forcing him to retreat. Koshibagaki no Kage almost hit Sukenari's elbow causing him to lose control. Tadatsune took advantage of this, and cut Sukenari from the left shoulder all the way under the right breast, killing him. According to legend, after killing Sukenari, Tadatsune jumped onto a wild boar.

When Tadatsune fell ill, Yoritomo would personally attend him, signifying that he had a great deal of trust in Tadatsune. Tadatsune's wife, who was said to be a virgin, drowned on the way to the Mishima Shrine where she prayed for his husband's recovery.

Tadatsune became a close retainer to Yoritomo's son, Minamoto no Yoriie. In 1203, Tadatsune killed Hiki Yoshikazu and wiped out the Hiki clan during the Hiki Yoshikazu Rebellion, ordered by Hōjō Tokimasa. Enraged by this, Yoriie ordered Tadatsune and Wada Yoshimori to assassinate the mastermind of the incident, Hōjō Tokimasa. Yoshimori did not follow Yoriie's orders and informed Tokimasa about the plan. On the other hand, Tadatsune's ambiguous behavior was deemed suspicious and caused Tokimasa's brother Hōjō Tadatoki to misinterpret Tatatsune's intentions. Following this on October 12, 1203, Tadatsune was killed by Katō Kagekado on behalf of the Hōjō clan, caused by Tadatoki's misunderstanding. Tadatsune was aged 37 at the time of his death.

In Soga Monogatari, although Tadatsune became known for his bravery after he jumped backwards onto a wild boar and killed it in front of Yoritomo, it is said that the boar was actually a Yama-no-Kami, and that he was divinely punished to be suspected of betrayal.

He is also known for exploring the Hitoana cave in Mount Fuji.

== Family ==
- Father: Unknown
- Mother: Unknown
- Brothers:
  - Nitta Gorō Tadamasa
  - Nitta Tadatoki
- Wife: Unknown

== In popular culture ==
=== Television drama ===
- Kusa Moeru (1979) Jouji Nakata as Nitta Tadatsune
- The 13 Lords of the Shogun (2022) Takakiji Hiroyuki as Nitta Tadatsune

== Gallery ==
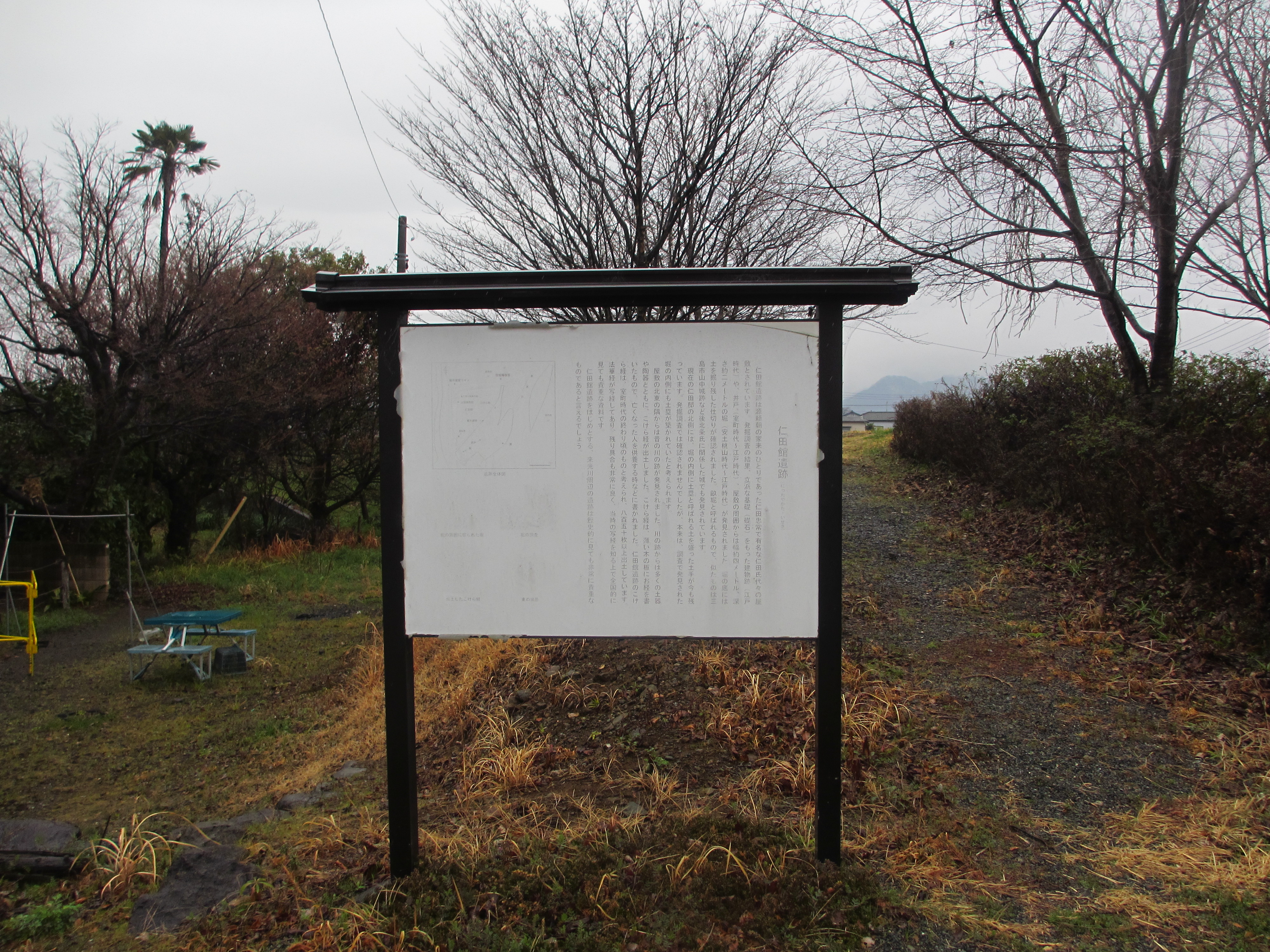
Site of Nitta Mansion near Nitta Station, Izu, Shizuoka Prefecture

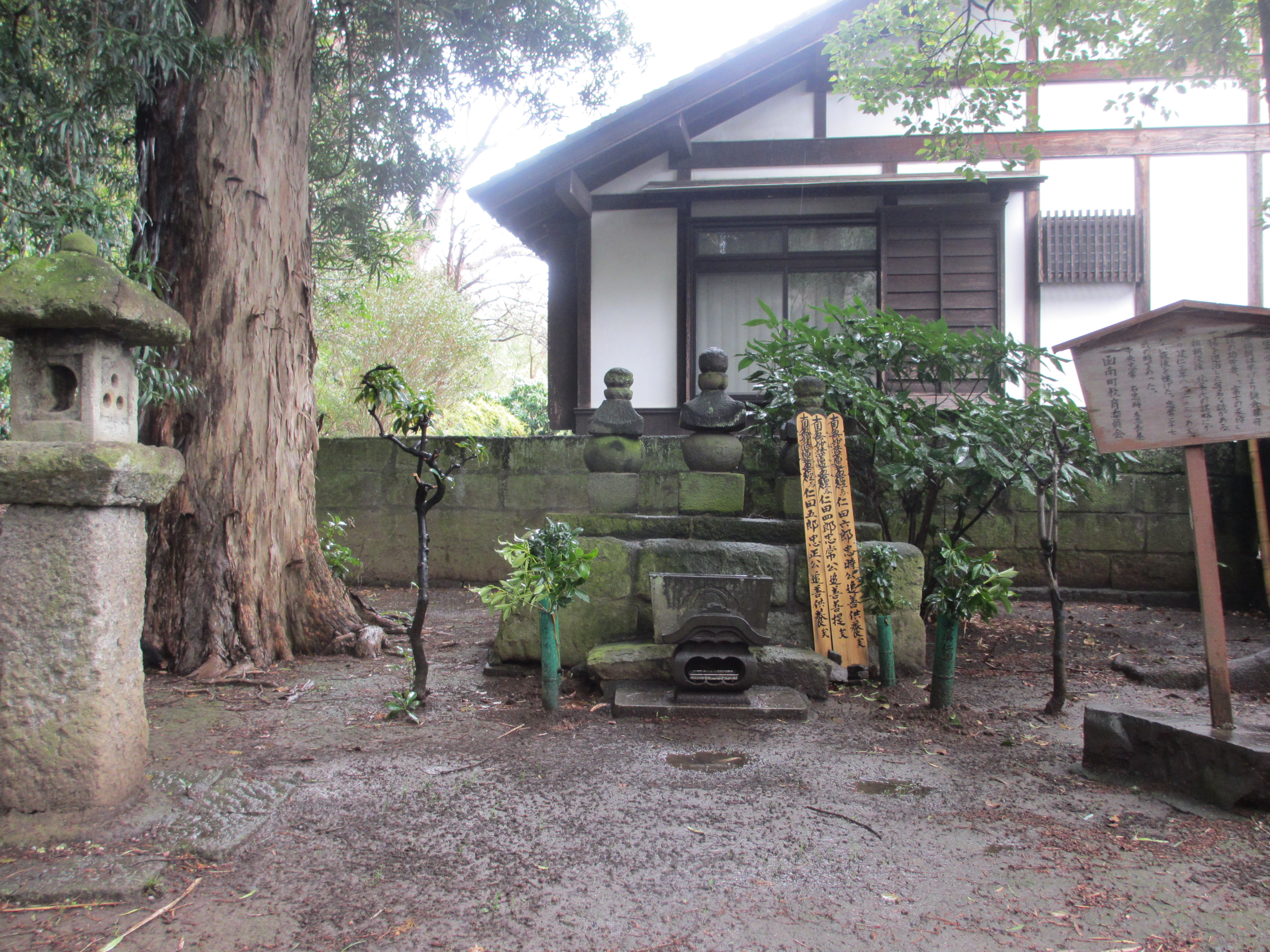
Graves of Nitta Tadatsune, Tadatoki and Tadamasa in 167‐1, Nitta, Kannami, Shizuoka Prefecture

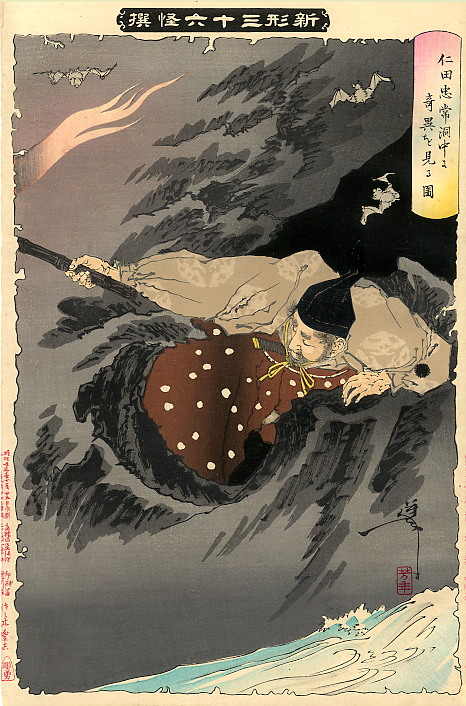
Nitta Tadatsune by Yoshitoshi in Apparition in a Cave

== See also ==
- Revenge of the Soga Brothers
