= Oyama Tomomasa =

Japanese samurai (1155–1238)

Oyama Tomomasa 小山朝政
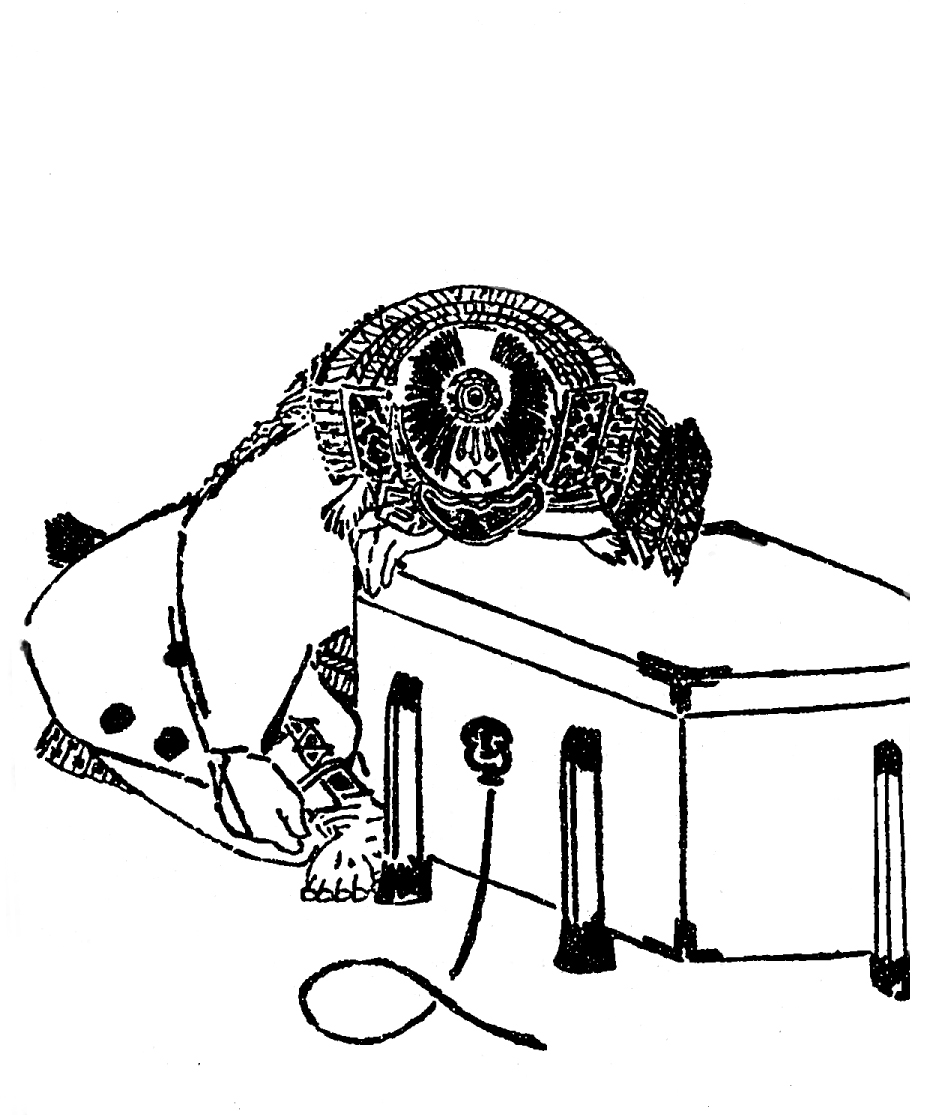
- Oyama Tomomasa in Zenken Kojitsu by Kikuchi Yōsai
- Born: 1155
- Died: May 15, 1238 (aged 82–83)
- Other names: Koshirō
- Occupations: samurai lord, gokenin
- Children: Oyama Tomonaga
- Parents: Oyama Masamitsu (father); Samukawa-no-ama (mother)

Oyama Tomomasa (小山 朝政, 1155 – May 15, 1238) was a Japanese samurai lord and gokenin of the late Heian and early Kamakura period. He served as shugo of Shimotsuke Province and Harima Province. He was an influential gokenin during the founding of the Kamakura shogunate. He was the 2nd head of the Oyama clan. He was also known as Oyama Koshirō.

== Biography ==
Tomomasa was born in 1155, in Shimotsuke Province, the eldest son of his father, Oyama Masamitsu, and his mother, Samukawa-no-ama. His father was a feudal lord and the leader of the largest samurai group in Shimotsuke, and had founded the Oyama clan at Oyama Manor in Tsuga, Shimotsuke Province. He descended from the Fujiwara clan through Fujiwara no Hidesato. His mother was the wet nurse of Minamoto no Yoritomo.

Tomomasa looked after his family home when his father was away in Kyoto during the early Jishō–Juei War. However, he eventually joined Minamoto no Yoritomo's forces through his mother's relation to Yoritomo.

He distinguished himself at the Battle of Noginomiya, defeating Minamoto no Yoshihiro, who had attacked Shimotsuke with Ashikaga Tadatsuna, in 1183. For this achievement, he was appointed jitō of Murata Shimo Manor in Hitachi Province and Higano township in Shimotsuke Province.

He participated in the Battle of Ichi-no-Tani in 1184.

An influential gokenin during the founding of the Kamakura shogunate, he joined Minamoto no Yoritomo in the Battle of Ōshū in 1189. He defeated the Northern Fujiwara forces in Monomigaoka allowing Yoritomo to advance to Takahaba Castle in Tamatsukuri before finally defeating the remaining Northern Fujiwara forces in Hiraizumi.

He accompanied Yoritomo during his entry to Kyoto in 1190, and was appointed Lieutenant of the Right Division of Outer Palace Guards.

He served as shugo of Shimotsuke Province and Harima Province.

Tomomasa died on May 15, 1238, at the age of 84.

== In popular culture ==
=== TV series ===
- Kusa Moeru (1979) NHK Taiga drama, Oyama Tomomasa portrayed by Minoru Ōkōchi
- The 13 Lords of the Shogun (2022) NHK Taiga drama, Oyama Tomomasa portrayed by Atsushi Nakamura

== Gallery ==
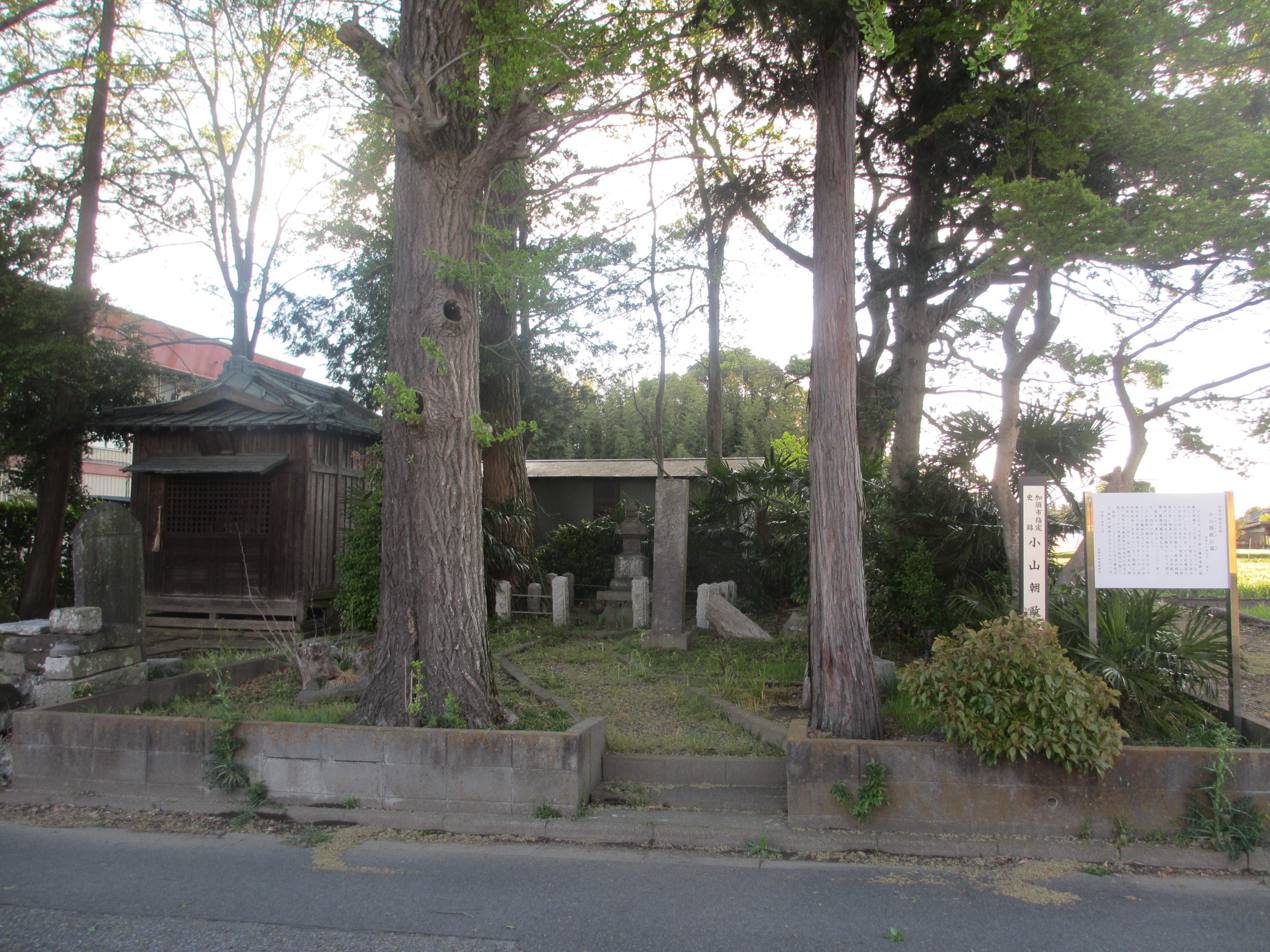
Oyama Tomomasa's tombsite at Tokushō-ji in Kazo, Saitama Prefecture (foundation dates to 1345)

Oyama Tomomasa's tombstone
