= Fuji no Makigari =

- Minamoto no Yoritomo
- Native name: 富士の巻狩り
- Date: June 8 - July 7, 1193
- Location: Fujino and Aizawa (the foot of Mount Fuji)
- Type: Hunting event
- Theme: Recreation, military exercise
- Motive: Showing off the authority of the shogun and carrying out military exercise
- Organised by: Minamoto no Yoritomo
- Participants: 700,000

Fuji no Makigari (富士の巻狩り) was a large-scale hunting event arranged by shogun Minamoto no Yoritomo from June to July 1193, centering around the foot of Mount Fuji in Japan. 700,000 people participated in the event, including a large number of the shogun's gokenin (retainers) and their beaters.

== Overview ==
Fuji no Makigari was held from June 8 to July 7, 1193, for about a month. Including the samurai's beaters, a total of 700,000 participated in the hunting event, and the historical chronicle of Azuma Kagami describes the scale of the event stating, "Such a crowd of archers that there is no point measuring." On June 8, 1193, the chronicle states "We arrived in Suruga Province to see the summer hunting event in Aizawa, Fujino" and "We are heading back to Kamakura from Suruga Province" on July 7, 1193. Ordered by Yoritomo, Hōjō Tokimasa was sent to Suruga Province on May 2 of the same year before the event for preparations. He directed the local gokenin and, together with Kanō Muneshige, constructed the mansions at the hunting site.

The participants spent the majority of the time in Fujino, from June 15 to July 7, with Azuma Kagami stating "We are staying at the Fujino Goryokan after hunting in Aizawa" on May 15, 1193. The Revenge of the Soga Brothers incident occurred at the event on May 28. Many people came to hear the news after the incident had occurred. It is said that a massive horde of countless gokenin and other influential people were crowding Fujino.

It is said that the purpose of Fuji no Makigari was to show off the authority of the shogun and to carry out military exercise. The hunting event began on the east side of the foot of Mount Fuji (what is currently Gotemba and Susono, Shizuoka Prefecture) and extended to the Asagiri Plateau (currently Fujinomiya, Shizuoka Prefecture) to the west. The land of Aizawa and Kamino, where the hunting was carried out, is located near the border between Suruga and Kai Provinces, which is also a major transit point from Kai to the Tōkaidō road, the most important of the Five Routes of the Edo period. In this way, it has been pointed out that the Minamoto clan of Kai (Kawachi Genji) intended to take control of the traffic route used to reach the Tōkaidō road.

== Participants ==
- Minamoto no Yoritomo
- Minamoto no Yoriie
- Hōjō Tokimasa
- Hōjō Yoshitoki
- Ashikaga Yoshikane
- Hatakeyama Shigetada
- Kajiwara Kagetoki
- Kajiwara Kagesue
- Kajiwara Kagetaka
- Kajiwara Kagesmochi
- Kajiwara Asakage
- Kajiwara Kagesada
- Soga Sukenobu
- Soga Sukenari
- Soga Tokimune
- Gosho no Gorōmaru
- Nitta Tadatsune
- Ōtomo Yoshinao
- Ogasawara Nagakiyo
- Miura Yoshizumi
- Miura Yoshimura
- Miura Yoshitsura
- Chiba Naritane
- Inage Shigenari
- Wada Yoshimori
- Yamana Yoshinori
- Oyama Tomomasa
- Oyama Munemasa
- Oyama Tomomitsu
- Satomi Yoshinari
- Sanuki Hirotsuna
- Kudō Suketsune
- Kudō Kagemitsu
- Kudō Yukimitsu
- Tsuchiya Yoshikiyo
- Kasuya Arisue
- Toki Mitsuhira
- Shishido Iemasa
- Hatano Yoshikage
- Aikō Suetaka
- Unno Yukiuji
- Fujisawa Kiyochika
- Mochizuki Shigetaka
- Sasaki Moritsuna
- Sasaki Yoshikiyo
- Shibuya Shigekuni
- Takeda Nobumitsu
- Yoshikawa Tomokane
- Katō Mitsukazu
- Moro Suemitsu
- Sahara Yoshitsura
- Inage Shigenari
- Naganuma Munemasa
- Utsunomiya Yoritsuna
- Yūki Tomomitsu
- Tairako Arinaga
- Kikkawa Tomokane
- Okabe Yasaburō
- Okabe Kiyomasu
- Hori Fujita
- Shimokōbe Yukihira
- Sawara Toshitsura
- Hangaya Shigetomo
- Itō Suketoki
- Usuki Hachirō
- Ōtōnai

All according to Azuma Kagami.

== Incidents ==
=== Minamoto no Yoriie's deer ===
On June 16, 1193, Yoritomo's 12-year-old son Yoriie shot a deer for the first time. Hunting was stopped and a festival was held in the evening. Yoritomo was rejoiced by his son's achievement and sent a messenger to his wife Masako, but she sent the messenger back, saying that a military commander's son being able to shoot a deer is nothing to celebrate.

=== Kudō Kagemitsu ===
During the hunting on June 27, a big deer suddenly ran before Yoritomo. Kudō Kagemitsu, who was near Yoritomo, shot at the deer. Kagemitsu, a master of archery, shot up to three times, but missed all his shots. Kagemitsu said, "I have been hunting for more than 70 years since I was 11 years old, but I have never failed to kill my prey. This must be the deer that Yama-no-Kami rides."

As people were already wondering about the strange incident, the same evening Kagemitsu fell ill and collapsed. Yoritomo thought this was very strange and considered ending the hunting event and returning home. However, after receiving advice from his shukurō (wise old men) the hunting continued the next day and for the following seven days.

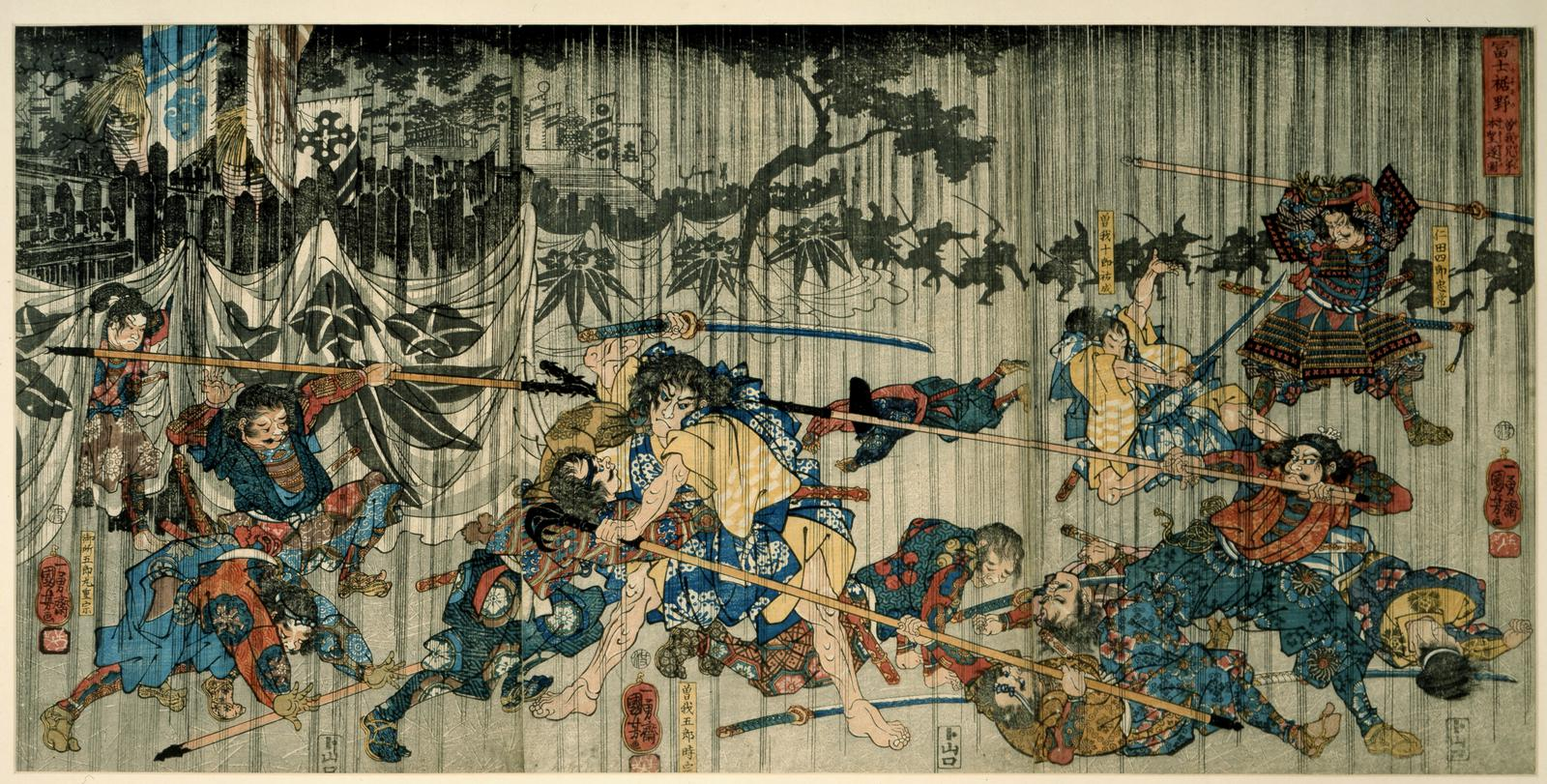
Moor at the Foot of Mt. Fuji - Soga Brothers Achieving their Avowed Wish

=== Revenge of the Soga Brothers ===
On June 28, 1193, on the last night of Fuji no Makigari, the Revenge of the Soga Brothers took place at the event causing a turmoil. The participants were staying in Kamino, Fujino (in present-day Kamiide, Fujinomiya, Shizuoka Prefecture). The Soga brothers, Soga Sukenari and Tokimune, entered Kamino no Goryokan, where Kudō Suketsune, the killer of their biological father, was staying, and killed Suketsune. Ōtōnai, who was drinking sake with Suketsune was also killed by the brothers. Two prostitutes, Tengo-no-Shuku and Kisegawa-no-Shuku, who were accompanying Suketsune, started screaming causing a big uproar at the scene. After the brothers killed Uda Gorō and nine other participants injuring Tairako Arinaga, Aikō Suetaka, Kikkawa Tomokane, Katō Mitsukazu, Unno Yukiuji, Okabe Yasaburō, Okabe Kiyomasu, Hori Fujita and Usuki Hachirō at the scene, the elder brother Sukenari was shot by Suketsune's subordinate Nitta Tadatsune. The younger brother Tokimune killed all the samurai one by one who attempted to stop him, and raided Yoritomo's living quarters. However, Gosho no Gorōmaru, who was in Yoritomo's bedchamber, took Tokimune down and captured him, thus ending the massacre and saving the shogun from a possible assassination attempt. After this, Yoritomo took Tokimune in for questioning and had him executed the next day.

== Related events ==
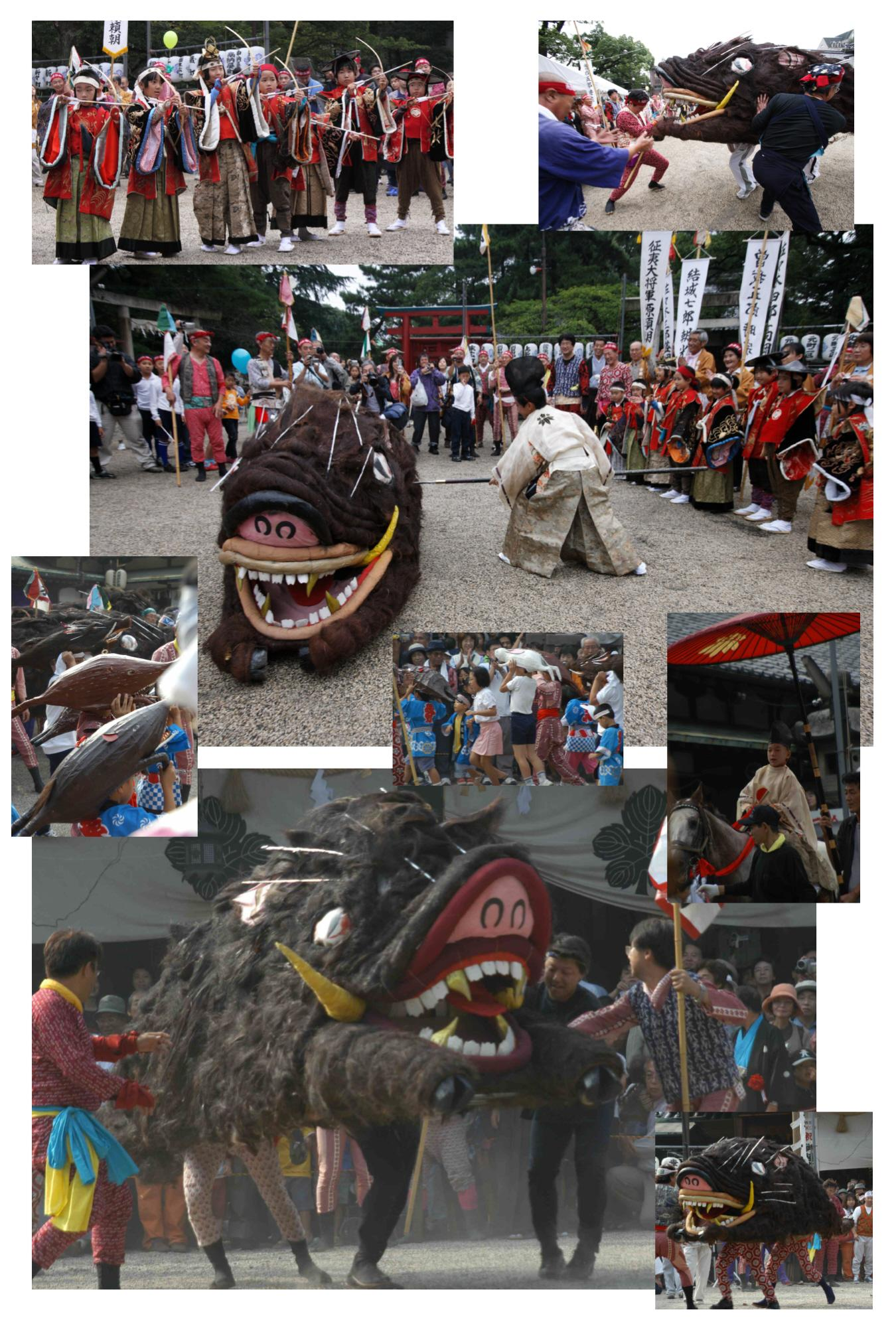
- Fuji no Makigari at Yokkaichi Festival in Yokkaichi: The rampaging wild boar is driven into the Suwa Shrine, and children dressed as samurai under Minamoto no Yoritomo shoot at it.
  Yokkaichi Festival, Fuji no Makigari procession
  - One of the processions in the Yokkaichi Festival, held in Yokkaichi, Mie Prefecture. It can be seen in the An'ei era (1772-1781), and it is also written about in the diary of the painter Shiba Kōkan in 1788, as "see the procession of Fuji no Makigari." Children dressed as samurai (Minamoto no Yoritomo on horseback, Hōjō Tokimasa, Soga Tokimune, etc.) wearing resplendent costumes shoot at a 4-meter-long papier-mâché wild boar. Fumio Niwa's Bodaiju, which received the Order of Culture, vividly depicts the appearance of this procession.
- Sannō Festival and Kanda Festival of the Edo period
  - Fuji no Makigari appears in Buyō Inshi's Seji Kenbunroku in "Volume 5: Things of the Townspeople", which records Fuji no Makigari-related festivals held in 1816.

== See also ==
- Minamoto no Yoritomo
- Revenge of the Soga Brothers
- Kamakura shogunate
