= Soga Monogatari =

War chronicle based on 'Revenge of Soga Brothers'

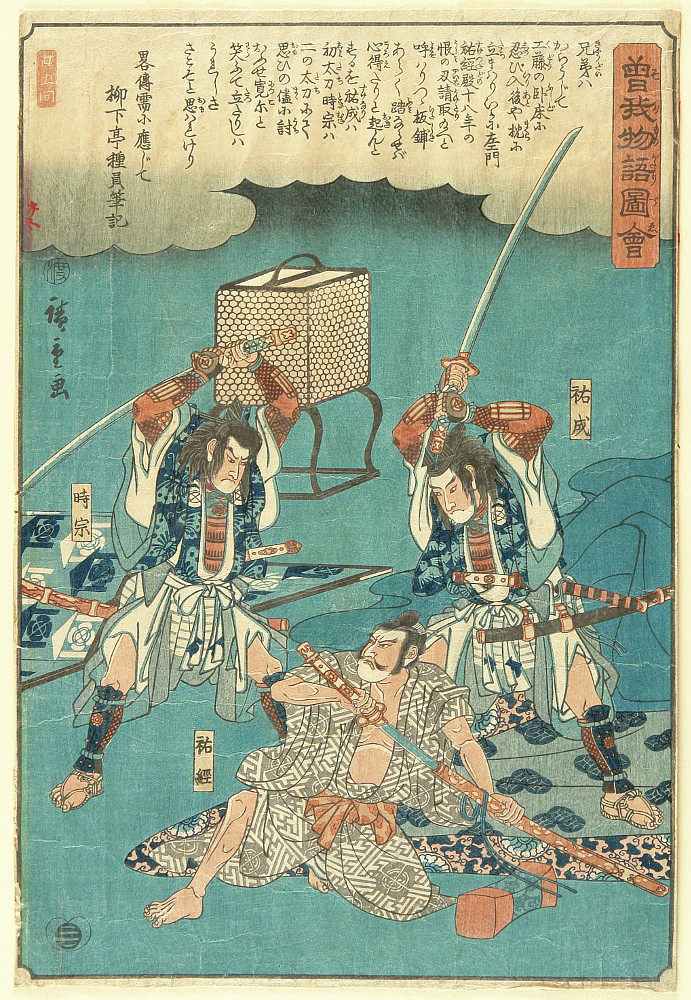
Soga Monogatari Zue by Utagawa Hiroshige

Soga Monogatari (曽我物語) is a Japanese military chronicle-tale based on the vengeance incident, Revenge of Soga Brothers. The story is often known as The (illustrated) Tale of the Soga Brothers or The Revenge of the Soga Brothers. It is sometimes written as Soga Monogatari Zue (The Tale of the Soga brothers in pictures). It is regarded by some as the last of the gunki monogatari or great "war tales".

== Plot ==
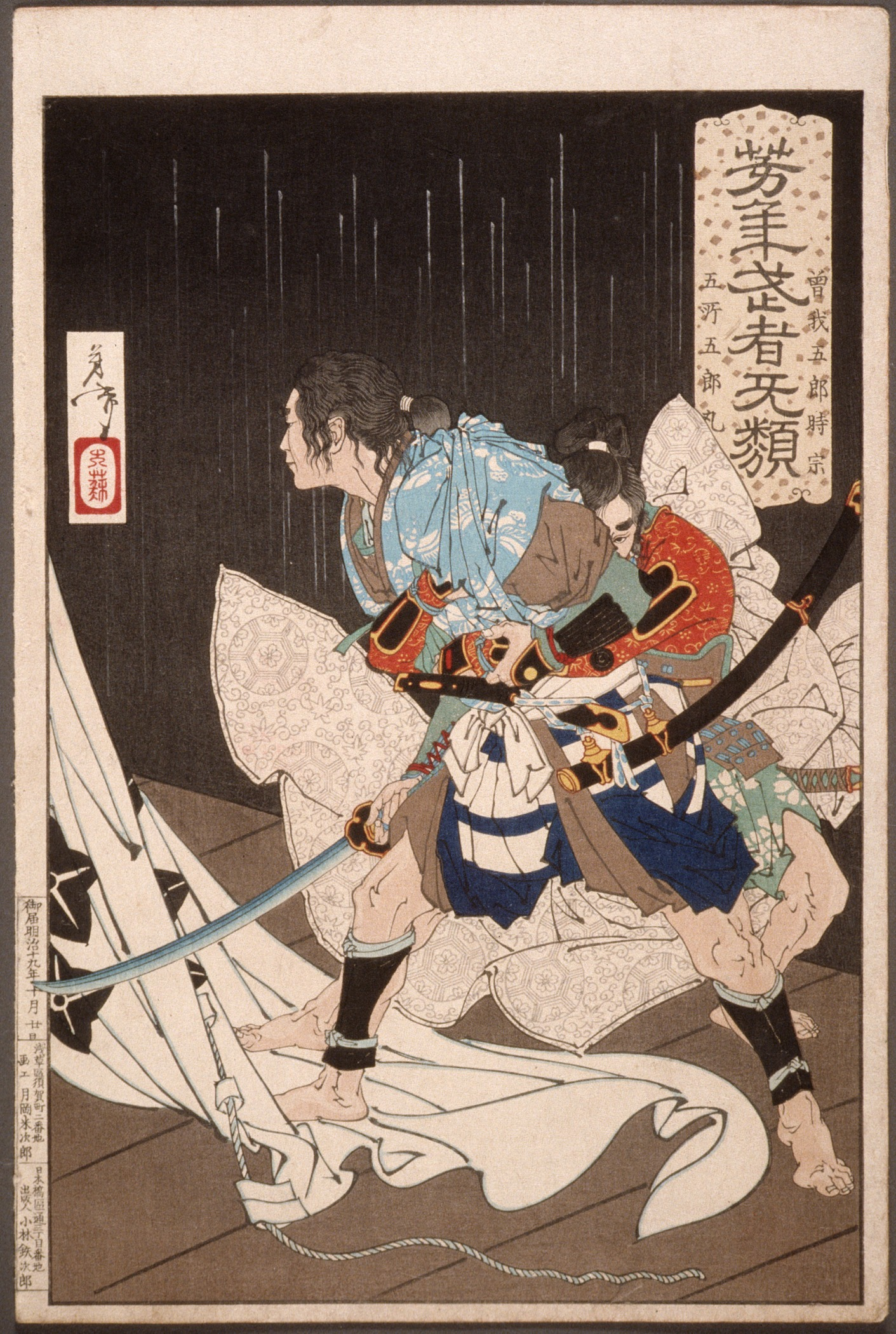
Gosho no Gorōmaru capturing Soga Tokimune. From the ukiyo-e series Warriors Trembling with Courage by Tsukioka Yoshitoshi.

Events take place in 12th-century Japan. The generally accepted version is that the father of the Soga brothers, Soga Sukenari and Soga Tokimune, was killed (the reasons differ, but it was probably an argument over land rights) when the two were infants. As adults the brothers became skilled fighters intent on avenging their father and retrieving his sword Tomokirimaru.

In May 1193, the Soga brothers participated in shogun Minamoto Yoritomo's hunting event Fuji no Makigari. On the last night of the event, the brothers took their revenge and killed their father Kudō Yūsuke. After the brothers killed ten other participants in a fierce battle, the elder brother Sukenari was shot by Yūsuke's subordinate Nitta Tadatsune. The younger brother Tokimune killed all the samurai one by one who attempted to stop him, and broke into Yoritomo's living quarters. However, Yoritomo's close vassal Gosho no Gorōmaru, who was in Yoritomo's bedchamber, took Tokimune down, thus ending the massacre and saving the shogun from a possible assassination attempt. The next day, Tokimune was brought in for questioning by Yoritomo about the motives of the incident, but was ultimately executed.

== Authorship ==
The Tale of the Soga Brothers cannot be traced to a single creator. Like most of these historical stories, it is the result of the compounding of (often differing) versions passed down through an oral or other tradition. The origin of the story may be true, but the story is probably romanticised. In some versions of the story it is only revealed at the end that the main character is actually one of the brothers.

== Theme ==
The Tale of the Soga Brothers is an example of "blood revenge", similar to a vendetta.

== In popular culture ==
The story has been the subject of many Noh, kabuki and bunraku performances. There are also updated versions such as Sukeroku (The Flower of Edo) (an 18th-century kabuki play, which is regarded as one of the Kabuki Jūhachiban). It is also said that the Soga tales in Kōwakamai are based on this tale.

The story and its performers have been popular subjects for woodblock prints, netsuke and okimono.

The story has also been the subject of a number of films.

== Notes ==
In Japan there are many statues of the brothers, such as the famous statue in the Hachiman Jinja in Kawazu, Shizuoka. According to tradition they were buried at the foot of Mount Fuji. There is a sculpture of their tombs among the stone statues in Hakone.

Otodome Falls is one of the locations in a version of the tale from the Kamakura period.

== Translations ==
The story was translated by Thomas J. Cogan. This translation was reviewed by Laurence Kominz in the Harvard Journal of Asiatic Studies.

== Gallery ==
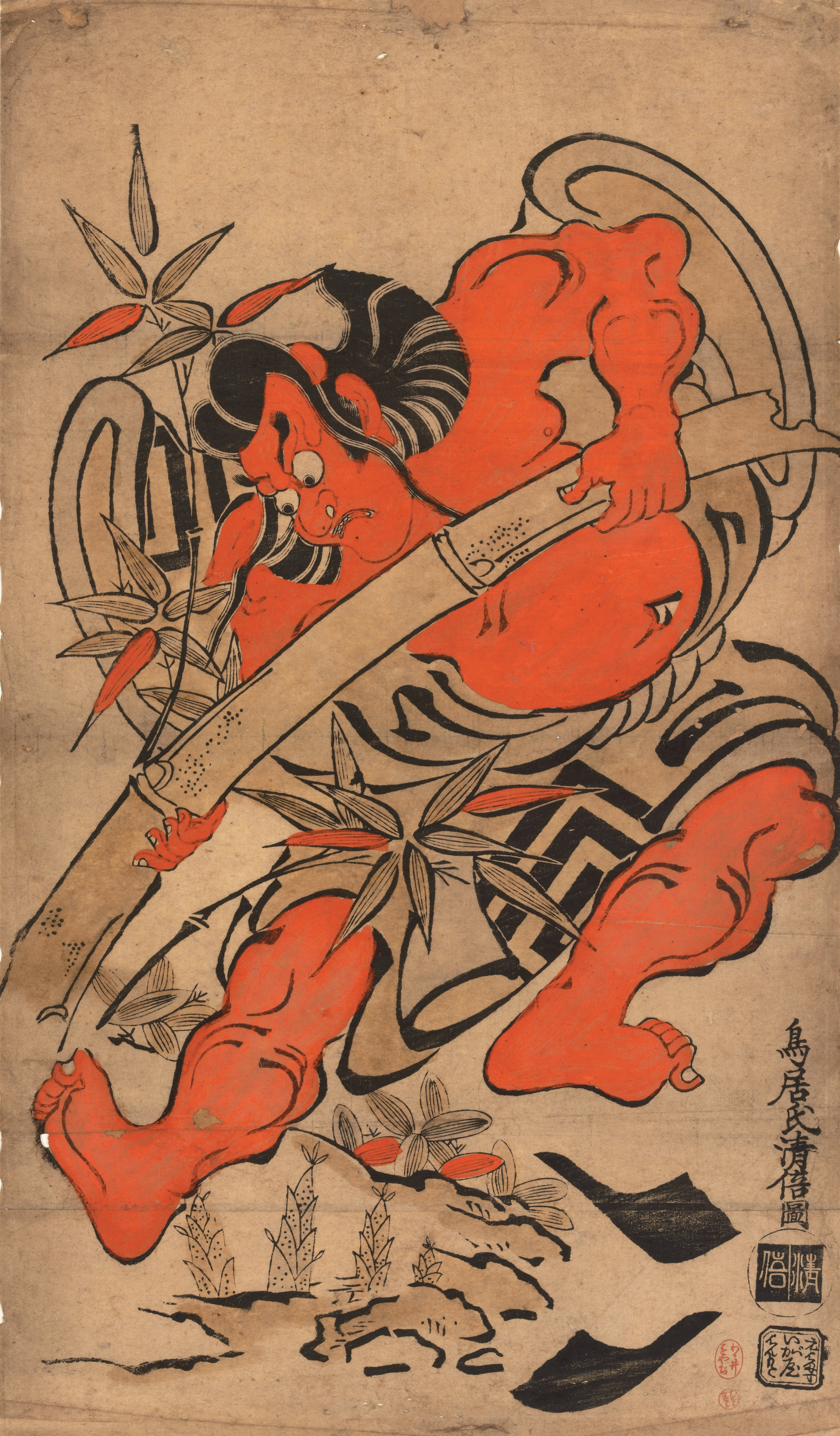
A print of Ichikawa Danjuro I in his role as Soga Gorō

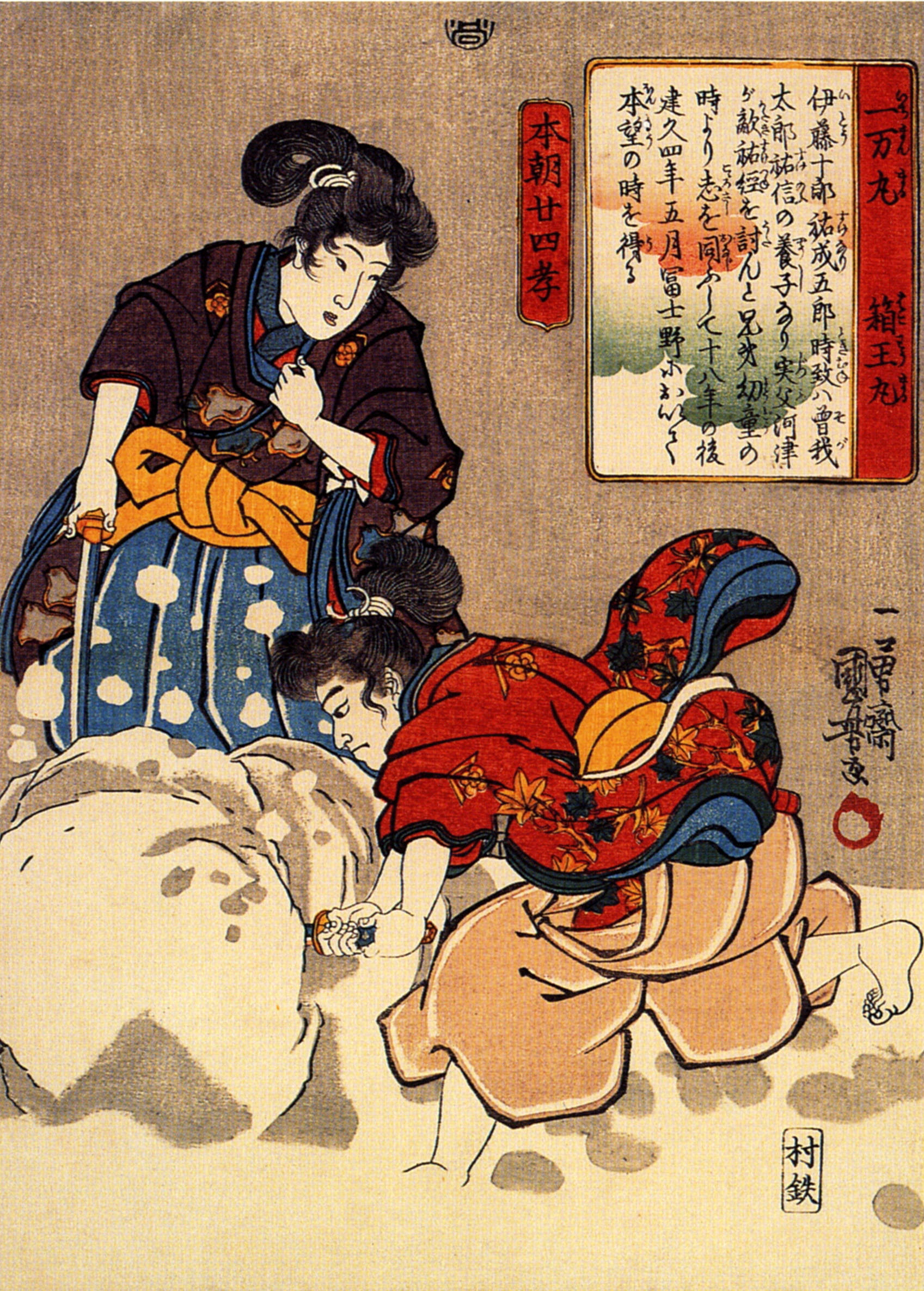
A print of the Soga brothers practising swordstrokes on a heap of snow

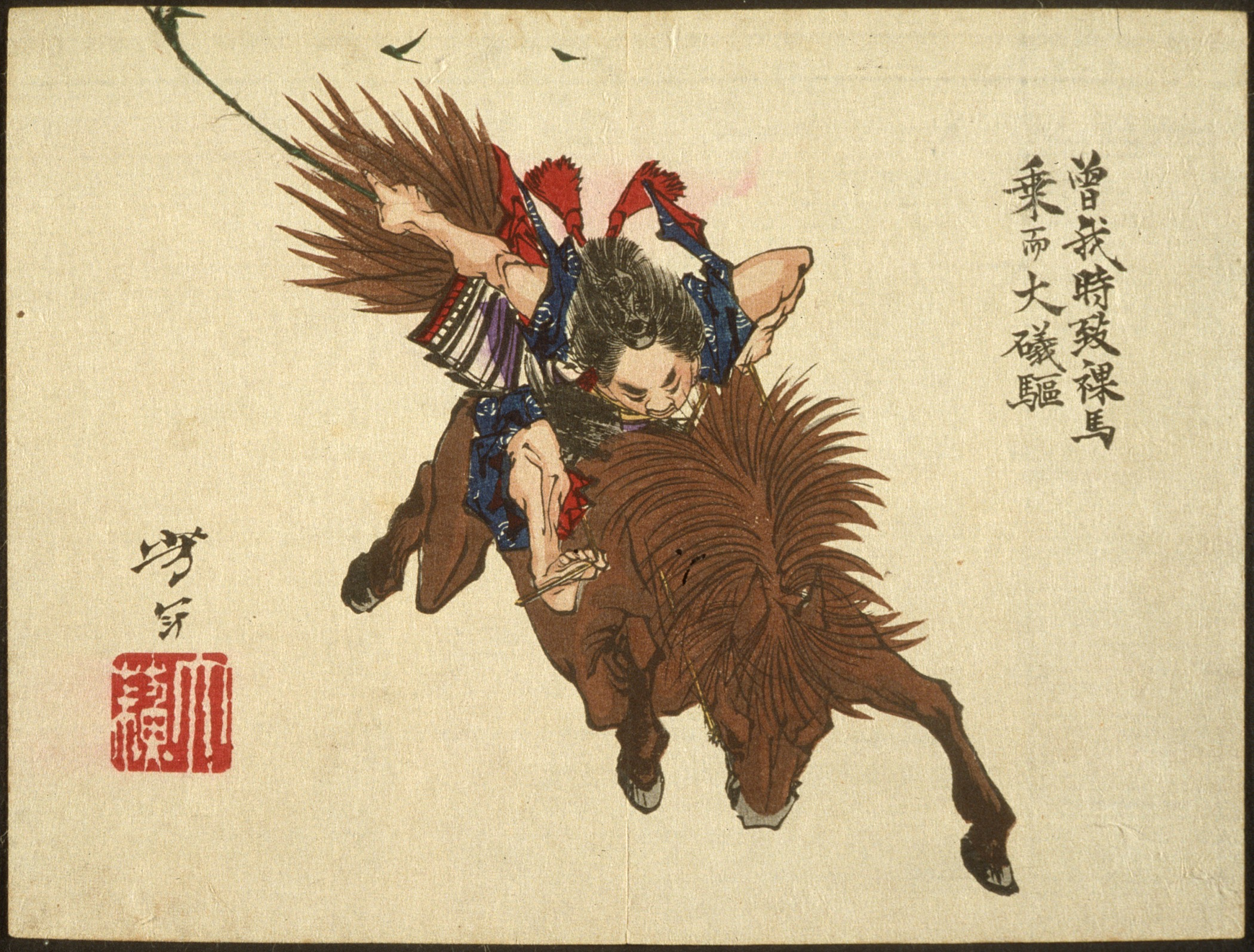
Gorō riding to Ōiso
