= Kusa Moeru =

1979 Japanese television series

- Genre: Taiga drama
- Written by: Takehiro Nakajima
- Directed by: Makoto Ohara
- Starring: Kōji Ishizaka; Shima Iwashita; Ken Matsudaira; Shōhei Hino; Sakae Takita; Tetsuya Takeda; Hiroshi Fujioka; Ryunosuke Kaneda; Mitsuko Kusabue; Shinjirō Ehara; Kyōko Maya; Keiko Matsuzaka; Onoe Tatsunosuke I Onoe Shoroku II
- Theme music composer: Joji Yuasa
- Opening theme: NHK Symphony Orchestra
- Country of origin: Japan
- Original language: Japanese
- No. of episodes: 51

Production
- Running time: 45 minutes

Original release
- Network: NHK
- Release: January 7 – December 23, 1979

Related
- The 13 Lords of the Shogun

Kusa Moeru (草燃える) is a 1979 Japanese television series. It is the 17th NHK taiga drama.

It is also the first Taiga drama to standardize the use of modern language in dialogue starting with this one onward. On the other hand, characters did not use first names to address others as it was considered disrespectful historically, instead used people's common names and court ranks as was custom for the time.

== Story ==
Kusa Moeru deals with the rise and fall of the Kamakura shogunate at the start of the Kamakura period. Based on Michiko Nagai's novels "Hojo Masako", "Enkan" etc.

The story chronicles the lives of Minamoto no Yoritomo and Hōjō Masako. As the drama producers found it difficult to create a solo female protagonist, they made the drama with dual protagonists in mind. Minamoto no Yoritomo's story ends halfway with his death, then Masako takes over the leading role for the last half. However, even with this structure, the first half emphasizes on Masako's perspective of events, making her essentially the main character of the entire story.

== Cast ==
=== Minamoto no Yoritomo's family ===
- Kōji Ishizaka as Minamoto no Yoritomo, the first shōgun of the Kamakura shogunate
  - Yōji Matsuda as young Yoritomo
- Shima Iwashita as Hōjō Masako
- Tomiyuki Kunihiro as Minamoto no Yoshitsune
- Hiromi Go as Minamoto no Yoriie, the second shōgun
  - Shingo Tsurumi as young Yoriie
- Saburō Shinoda as Minamoto no Sanetomo, the third shōgun
  - Taiki Matsuno as young Sanetomo
- Kimiko Ikegami as Ōhime

=== Minamoto no Yoritomo's vassals ===
- Shinjirō Ehara as Kajiwara Kagetoki
- Tetsuya Takeda as Adachi Morinaga
- Shōhei Hino as Adachi Kagemori
- Kei Sato as Hiki Yoshikazu
- Hiroshi Fujioka as Miura Yoshimura
- Toshio Shiba as Miura Taneyoshi
- Masaki Kyomoto as Komawakamaru (later known as Miura Mitsumura)
- Shin Kishida as Ōe no Hiromoto
- Kohji Moritsugu as Hatakeyama Shigetada
- Goro Ibuki as Wada Yoshimori
- Jouji Nakata as Nitta Tadatsune
- Hōsei Komatsu as Kazusa-no-suke Hirotsune

=== Hōjō clan ===
- Ryunosuke Kaneda as Hōjō Tokimasa
- Naoko Otani as Maki no Kata
- Ken Matsudaira as Hojo Yoshitoki
- Jin Nakayama as Hōjō Munetoki
- Junpei Morita as Hōjō Tokifusa
- Hisayuki Nakajima as Hōjō Yasutoki
  - Toshinori Omi as young Yasutoki
- Ryoko Sakaguchi as Nohagi, a.k.a. Hime no Mae, Yoshitoki's second wife
- Keiko Matsuzaka as Akane (fictional person), Yoshitoki's first wife

=== Taira clan ===
- Nobuo Kaneko as Taira no Kiyomori
- Kaneko Iwasaki as Taira no Tokiko, Kiyomori's wife
- Ken Nishida as Taira no Munemori
- Etsuko Ikuta as Taira no Tokuko

=== Others ===
- Tomomi Sato as Tokiwa Gozen
- Sakae Takita as Ito Sukeyuki
- Akira Kume as Ito Sukechika
- Isao Hashizume as Ito Sukekiyo
- Takeshi Kato as Ōba Kagechika
- Kyōzō Nagatsuka as Yamaki Kanetaka
- Keiko Matsuzaka as Kogiku
- Yumi Takigawa as Otowa
- Rokko Toura as Minamoto no Yukiie
- Shigeo Ozawa as Ashikaga Yoshiuji, Hōjō Yasutoki's son-in-law
- Rino Katase
- Yasuyoshi Hara as Soga Tokimune
- Toshio Kurosawa as Kokemaru
- Akihiro Miwa
- Akihiko Hirata as Ichijō Yoshiyasu
- Junko Natsu as Kyo no Tsubone
- Kōjirō Kusanagi as Chinnakei
- Mitsuko Kusabue as Tango no Tsubone
- Onoe Shoroku II as Go-Shirakawa
- Onoe Tatsunosuke I as Emperor Go-Toba
- Noboru Nakaya

== TV schedule ==
Episode	Original airdate	Title	Directed by	Rating
1	January 7, 1979	"Hirugakojima no Runin" (蛭が小島の流人)	Makoto Ōhara	27.9%
2	January 14, 1979	"Koibumi" (恋文)	Hiroyuki Eguchi	30.5%
3	January 21, 1979	"Futari Yoshitsune" (二人義経)	Shizuhiro Izuta	34.7%
4	January 28, 1979	"Masako Ryakudatsu" (政子略奪)	Makoto Ōhara	29.6%
5	February 4, 1979	"Muko-dono, Shūto-dono" (婿殿、舅殿)	Hiroyuki Eguchi	28.7%
6	February 11, 1979	"Misshi wa Hashiru" (密使は走る)	Shizuhiro Izuta	29.1%
7	February 18, 1979	"Yoritomo Tatsu" (頼朝起つ)	Makoto Ōhara	27.5%
8	February 25, 1979	"Ishibashiyama no Kassen" (石橋山の合戦)	Makoto Ōhara	27.3%
9	March 4, 1979	"Yoritomo Saiki" (頼朝再起)	Hiroyuki Eguchi	32.4%
10	March 11, 1979	"Kamakura e" (鎌倉へ)	Shizuhiro Izuta	30.3%
11	March 18, 1979	"Ani no Namida・Otōto no Namida" (兄の涙・弟の涙)	Makoto Ōhara	31.4%
12	March 25, 1979	"Kiga Mōja" (飢餓亡者)	Hiroyuki Eguchi	29.2%
13	April 1, 1979	"Wakagimi Tanjō" (若君誕生)	Shizuhiro Izuta	27.6%
14	April 8, 1979	"Masako Kyōran" (政子狂乱)	Makoto Ōhara	22.7%
15	April 15, 1979	"Ai no Katami" (愛のかたみ)	Hiroyuki Eguchi	24.0%
16	April 22, 1979	"Hitojichi" (人質)	Shizuhiro Izuta	27.1%
17	April 29, 1979	"Yoshitsune Shutsujin" (義経出陣)	Makoto Ōhara	25.8%
18	May 6, 1979	"Kiretsu" (亀裂)	Tōru Shōji	29.9%
19	May 13, 1979	"Kyō no Shirabyōshi" (京の白拍子)	Hiroyuki Eguchi	30.0%
20	May 20, 1979	"Dan-no-ura" (壇ノ浦)	Makoto Ōhara	27.5%
21	May 27, 1979	"Yoshitsune Gaisen" (義経凱旋)	Shizuhiro Izuta	24.4%
22	June 3, 1979	"Kamakura no Shikaku" (鎌倉の刺客)	Hiroyuki Eguchi	27.3%
23	June 10, 1979	"Miyako no Tōzoku-tachi" (都の盗賊たち)	Makoto Ōhara	23.3%
24	June 17, 1979	"Shizuka no Mai" (静の舞)	Makoto Ōhara	19.3%
25	June 24, 1979	"Yoritomo Jōraku" (頼朝上洛)	Shizuhiro Izuta	22.8%
26	July 1, 1979	"Hōō Hōgyo" (法皇崩御)	Hiroyuki Eguchi	22.6%
27	July 8, 1979	"Yoshitoki no Tsuma" (義時の妻)	Hiroshi Watanabe	25.6%
28	July 15, 1979	"Fuji no Makigari" (富士の巻狩)	Makoto Ōhara	24.5%
29	July 22, 1979	"Soga Kyōdai" (曽我兄弟)	Hiroyuki Eguchi	22.4%
30	July 29, 1979	"Ōhime Sakuran" (大姫錯乱)	Shizuhiro Izuta	19.2%
31	August 5, 1979	"Kuroi Tsumujikaze" (黒いつむじ風)	Makoto Ōhara	20.5%
32	August 12, 1979	"Yoritomo no Shi" (頼朝の死)	Hiroyuki Eguchi	23.5%
33	August 19, 1979	"Hime-gimi Dokusatsu" (姫君毒殺)	Shizuhiro Izuta	26.3%
34	August 26, 1979	"Yoriie Rangyō" (頼家乱行)	Tōru Shōji	24.4%
35	September 2, 1979	"Kajiwara Kagetoki no Metsubō" (梶原景時の滅亡)	Makoto Ōhara	25.0%
36	September 9, 1979	"Aku-zenji Zenjō" (悪禅師全成)	Hiroshi Watanabe	23.7%
37	September 16, 1979	"Hōjō no Inbō" (北条の陰謀)	Hiroyuki Eguchi	26.9%
38	September 23, 1979	"Hiki Metsubō" (比企滅亡)	Makoto Ōhara	25.6%
39	September 30, 1979	"Yoriie Tsuihō" (頼家追放)	Shizuhiro Izuta	26.7%
40	October 7, 1979	"Shuzen-ji" (修禅寺)	Hiroyuki Eguchi	24.1%
41	October 14, 1979	"Kashoku" (華燭)	Takashi Matsuhashi	25.5%
42	October 21, 1979	"Hatakeyama Tōbatsu" (畠山討伐)	Makoto Ōhara	31.7%
43	October 28, 1979	"Chichi to Ko" (父と子)	Shizuhiro Izuta	25.2%
44	November 4, 1979	"Go-Toba-in Shōka" (後鳥羽院頌歌)	Hiroyuki Eguchi	27.0%
45	November 11, 1979	"Sayogiku" (小夜菊)	Munehiro Anzai	24.2%
46	November 18, 1979	"Wada Gassen" (和田合戦)	Makoto Ōhara	24.3%
47	November 25, 1979	"Maboroshi no Fune" (幻の船)	Hiroyuki Eguchi	26.4%
48	December 2, 1979	"Funadama" (船霊)	Shizuhiro Izuta	24.9%
49	December 9, 1979	"Sanetomo Ansatsu" (実朝暗殺)	Makoto Ōhara	27.7%
50	December 16, 1979	"Miura Yoshimura no Sakubō" (三浦義村の策謀)	Hiroyuki Eguchi	22.5%
51	December 23, 1979	"Jōkyū no Ran" (承久の乱)	Makoto Ōhara	28.6%
Average rating 26.3% - Rating is based on Japanese Video Research (Kantō region).

Avg. Rating: 26.3% | Peak: 34.7%. All episodes still exist, however, 18 out of 51 episodes have distorted images and sound, as well as missing fragments.
