= Kudō Shigemitsu =

Kudō Shigemitsu 工藤茂光
- Born: Unknown
- Died: 1180
- Occupation: samurai
- Children: Kanō Muneshige
- Father: Kudō Suketaka

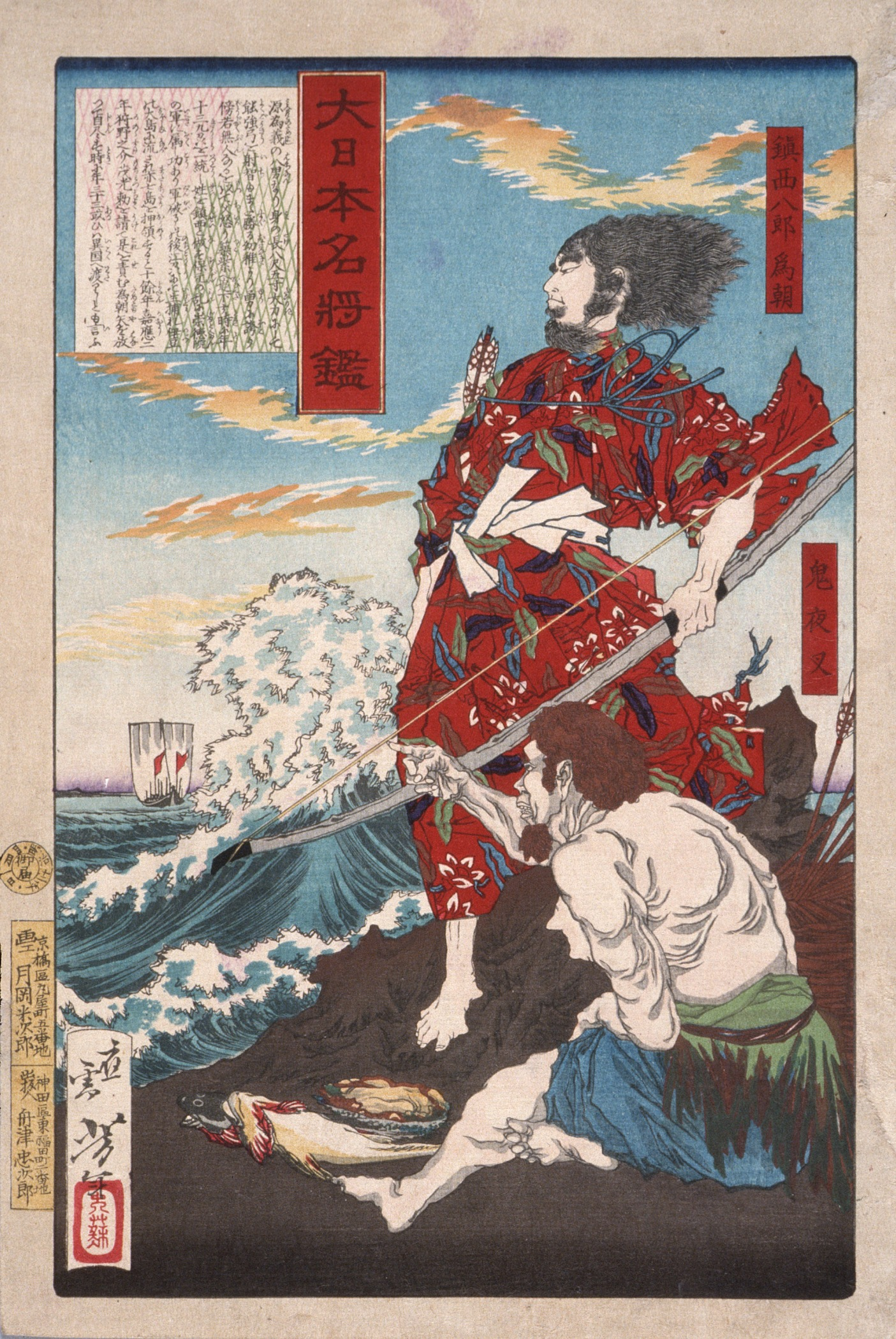
Minamoto no Tametomo watching the ship of a large army led by Shigemitsu (by Tsukioka Yoshitoshi)

Kudō Shigemitsu (工藤 茂光, died 1180) was a Japanese samurai lord and gōzoku of the late Heian period. He is the founder of the Kanō clan. He is also known as Kudō Mochimitsu.

== Life ==
Kanō Shigemitsu was born in Izu Province as the fourth son of Kudō Suketaka (Itō Ietsugu), the sixth head of Fujiwara Nanke's Kudō clan.

He was initially called Kanō, but later changed his family name to Kudō-suke (suke being one of the titles for kokushi officials) as he served as a kokushi official in his native Izu Province.

Shigemitsu reported Minamoto no Tametomo to the Imperial Court in 1170, who had looted peasants' food supplies needed for tax payment and abused the people of Ōshima after being exiled there during the Hōgen Rebellion in 1156. He also subjugated Tamemoto's warriors by taking the command of his army.

In 1180, he joined Minamoto no Yoritomo's call to arms, but committed suicide after being crippled during the Battle of Ishibashiyama.

== Family ==
Shigemitsu had a son, Kanō Muneshige.

Muneshige is said to be the ancestor of Kanō Masanobu, the founder of the Kanō school and the Kanō family, a family of distinguished Japanese painters.
