= Nōami =

Japanese artist (1397–1471)

Nōami 能阿弥 Ami 阿弥
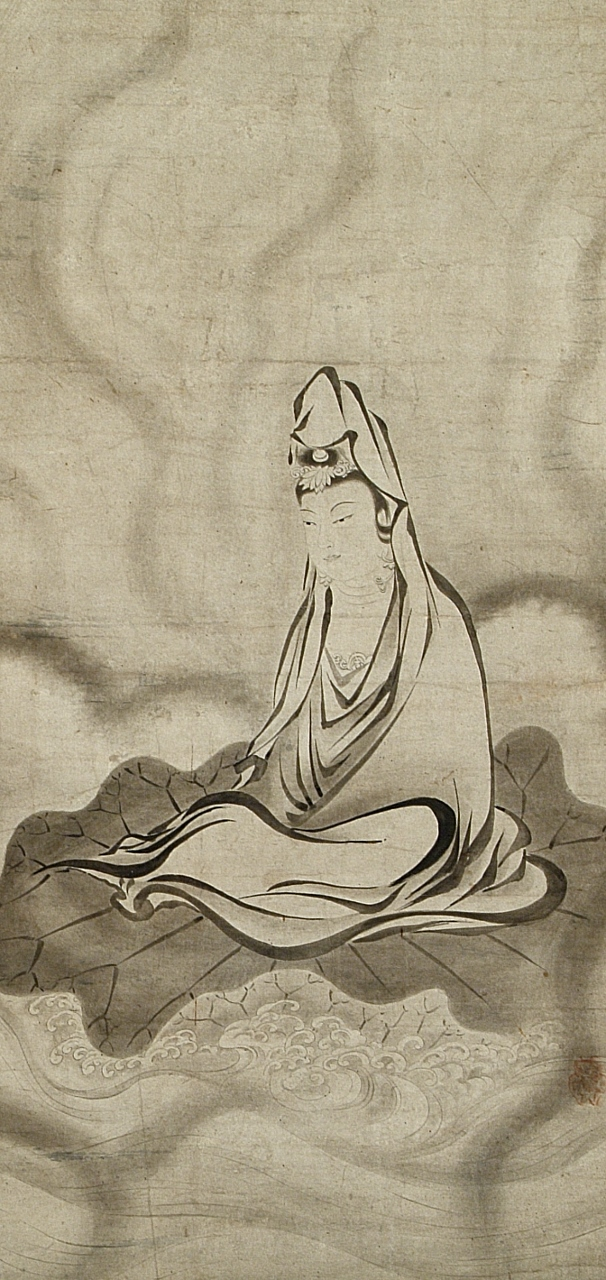
- Guayin in White Robe, 1473, Tokiwayama Bunko
- Born: Nakao Shinnō 中尾真能; 1397
- Died: 1471 (aged 73–74)
- Known for: Dōbōshū (artist and art connoisseur for the shogunate), Suiboku ink painting
- Patrons: Ashikaga Yoshinori and Ashikaga Yoshimasa

Nōami (能阿弥; 1397–1471) was a dōbōshū (artist and art connoisseur for the shogunate) in the service of the Ashikaga shogunate, an esteemed suiboku (monochrome ink) painter, renga (linked verse) poet and tate-bana flower artist. He was especially closely involved with the 6th shōgun Ashikaga Yoshinori and the 8th shōgun Ashikaga Yoshimasa. Nōami served the Ashikaga shogunate as the curator of the shogunate's collection of artworks known as the ‘Higashiyama Gomotsu’. An astute art connoisseur, Nōami collected and evaluated the imported artworks for the shogunate and developed elaborate guidelines for the display of artworks in shoin rooms such as the mannerisms for displaying hanging scrolls, ornamenting chigai-dana (staggered shelf alcove), displaying flowers and vases on alcoves, and displaying pieces on shoin writing desks. These guidelines are captured in the "Reference for the Display of Objects of Beauty" (Kundaikan Sō Chōki 君台観左右帳記) available from the National Diet Library Digital Collections. He served as an advisor in the ways of Japanese tea ceremony, kōdō (incense) and a variety of other elements related to the arts.

Nōami had a meaningful exchange with Murata Shukō. It is said that Nōami taught Shukō tate-bana flower arrangement and the appraisal of Chinese artworks while Shukō taught Nōami the daisu style of chanoyu (tea ritual).

An accomplished artist in his own right, Nōami was a student of Shūbun, and painted primarily landscapes, in the suiboku (monochrome ink) style. Together with his son Geiami and grandson Sōami, the three are known as the San-ami or "Three Ami's" and are among the most celebrated landscape painters in the Japanese tradition. Nōami is also known by his birth name of Nakao Shinnō 中尾真能, and by his buddhist name Shunōsai 春鷗斎.

== Selected works ==
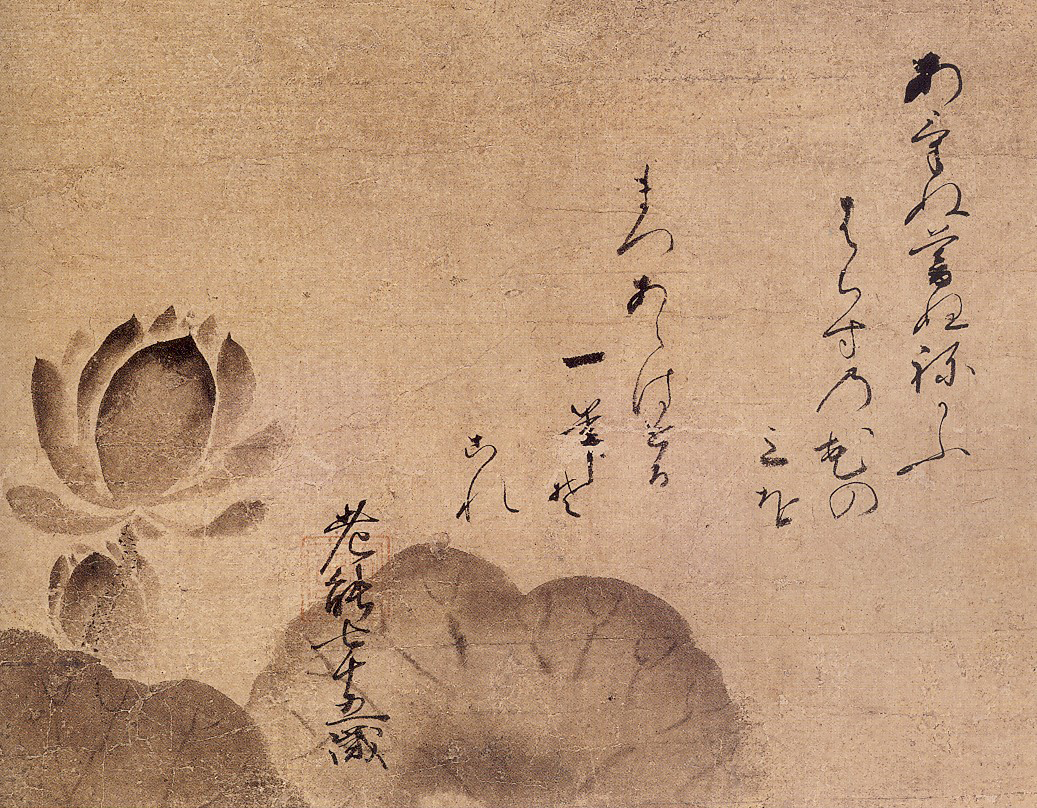
Lotus, Masaki Art Museum

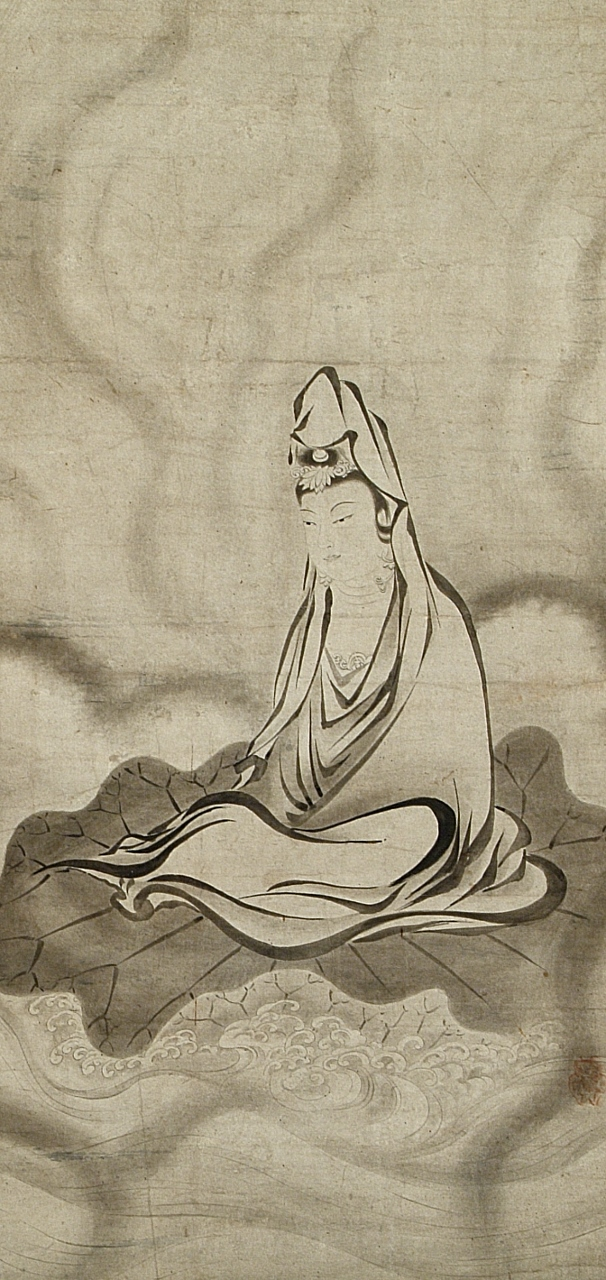
Kannon
