= Ishin Sūden =

16th century Japanese monk and diplomat

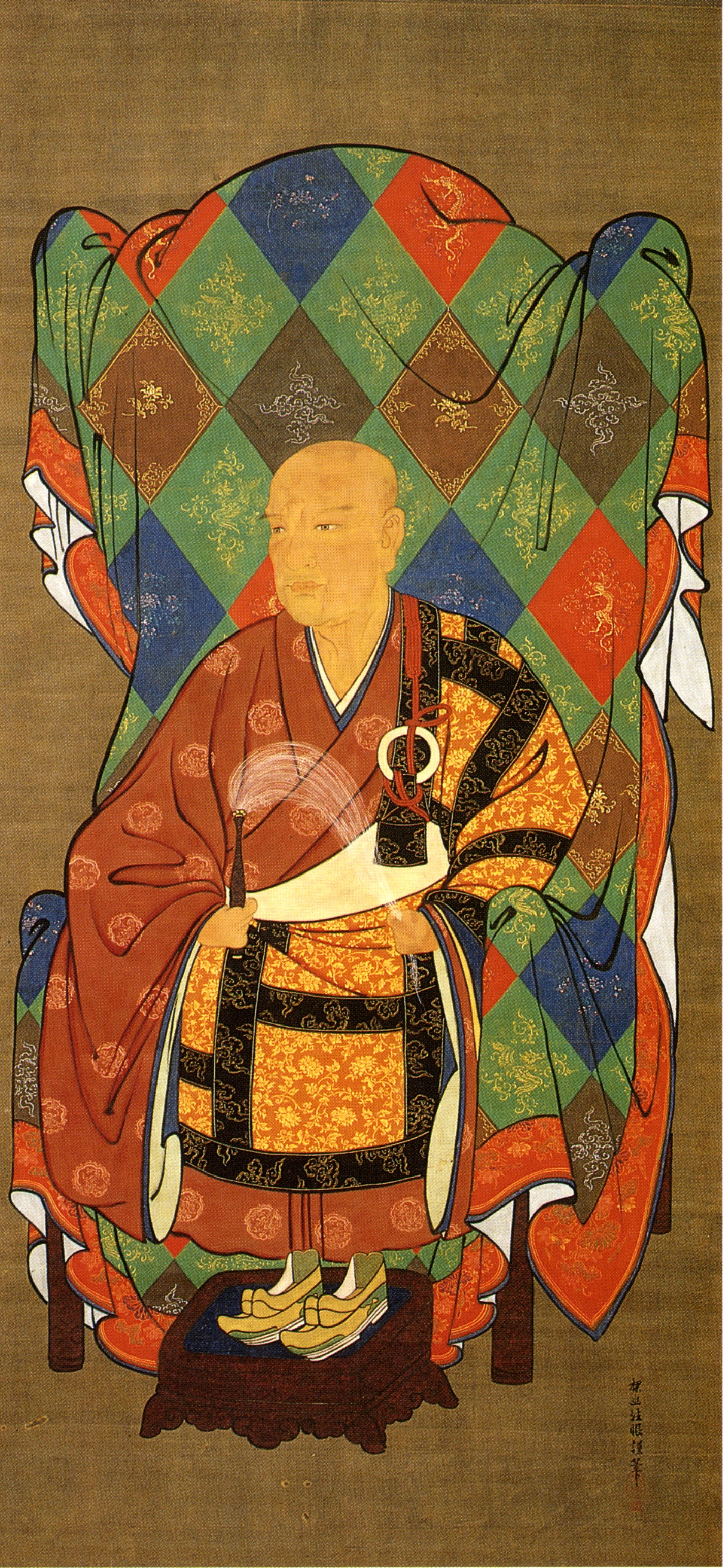
Portrait of Ishin Sūden by Kanō Tan'yū

Ishin Sūden (以心 崇伝; 1569 – 1633), also known as Konchi'in Sūden (金地院 崇伝), was a Japanese Rinzai Zen monk who was an advisor to Shogun Tokugawa Ieyasu, and later to shoguns Tokugawa Hidetada and Iemitsu on religious matters and foreign affairs. He was the 270th abbot of Nanzen-ji. He played a significant role in the initial development of the Tokugawa shogunate.

== Life ==
Sūden was born in 1569, in Kyoto, the second son of Isshiki Hidekatsu, a shogunate retainer of the Ashikaga shogunate. Born to a prestigious family, he was promised a future as a close associate of the Ashikaga shoguns. However, after the shogunate was overthrown in 1573, he became a disciple of the 266th Genpō Reizō at Nanzen-ji, the most prestigious of all government temples. He studied under Seishuku Tokurin at Takagamine Kinji-in and at Sanbō-in of Daigo-ji.

In October 1593, at the age of 24, he became the abbot of Fukugon-ji in Settsu Province and in November of the same year, of Sagami Zenkō-ji in Sagami Province. In 1605, at the age of 37, he became the abbot of Kenchō-ji, the first of the five temples of Kamakura.

In March 1605, he became the 270th abbot of Nanzen-ji, the highest position among the government temples, and received a purple robe from Emperor Go-Yōzei.

Sūden oversaw the administration of Shinto shrines and Buddhist temples in the country alongside Itakura Katsushige, and was involved in a great many diplomatic affairs along with advisors Hayashi Razan and Honda Masazumi. Sūden made his home at the Konchi-in temple he founded in Sunpu, and founded another one by the same name in Edo in 1618.

Sūden played an important role in negotiations with the Chinese Ming court over the reopening of trade and the problem of piracy. Sūden was also involved in communications with the Spanish authorities in Manila and with the Kingdom of Siam. He was instrumental in organizing and receiving Korean embassies to Japan. He drafted a great many communications during this period, some of the more notable ones being rejections of the notion that the shogun should be referred to as a "king" (王, ō), as this would imply subordination to the Emperor of China and tributary status within the Sinocentric world order.

Among his other works was the draft in 1615 of the Buke shohatto, which he then read at an assembly of daimyō at Fushimi, and the draft of the edict banning Christianity in the previous year. In 1616, he oversaw the funeral services for Tokugawa Ieyasu, along with priests Tenkai and Bonshun.

Sūden compiled all the diplomatic records of his period of service into the Ikoku nikki (Chronicle of Foreign Countries). He authored the Honkō kokushi nikki (Chronicles of Master Honkō), both of which remain valuable primary sources on the nature of diplomacy of the time, and on specific events.

== Selected works ==
- 影印本異国日記: 金地院崇伝外交文書集成 (Eiinbon Ikoku nikki: Konchiin Sūden gaikō monjo shūsei; Register of Foreign Affairs). Tokyo: Tokyo Bijutsu. ISBN 978-4-808-70544-2; OCLC 21946525
- 新訂本光國師日記 (Shintei Honkō kokushi nikki (Chronicles of Master Honkō). Tokyo: Zoku Gunsho Ruijū Kanseikai. OCLC 41561229
