= Special tea utensils =

Historic Japanese tea utensils

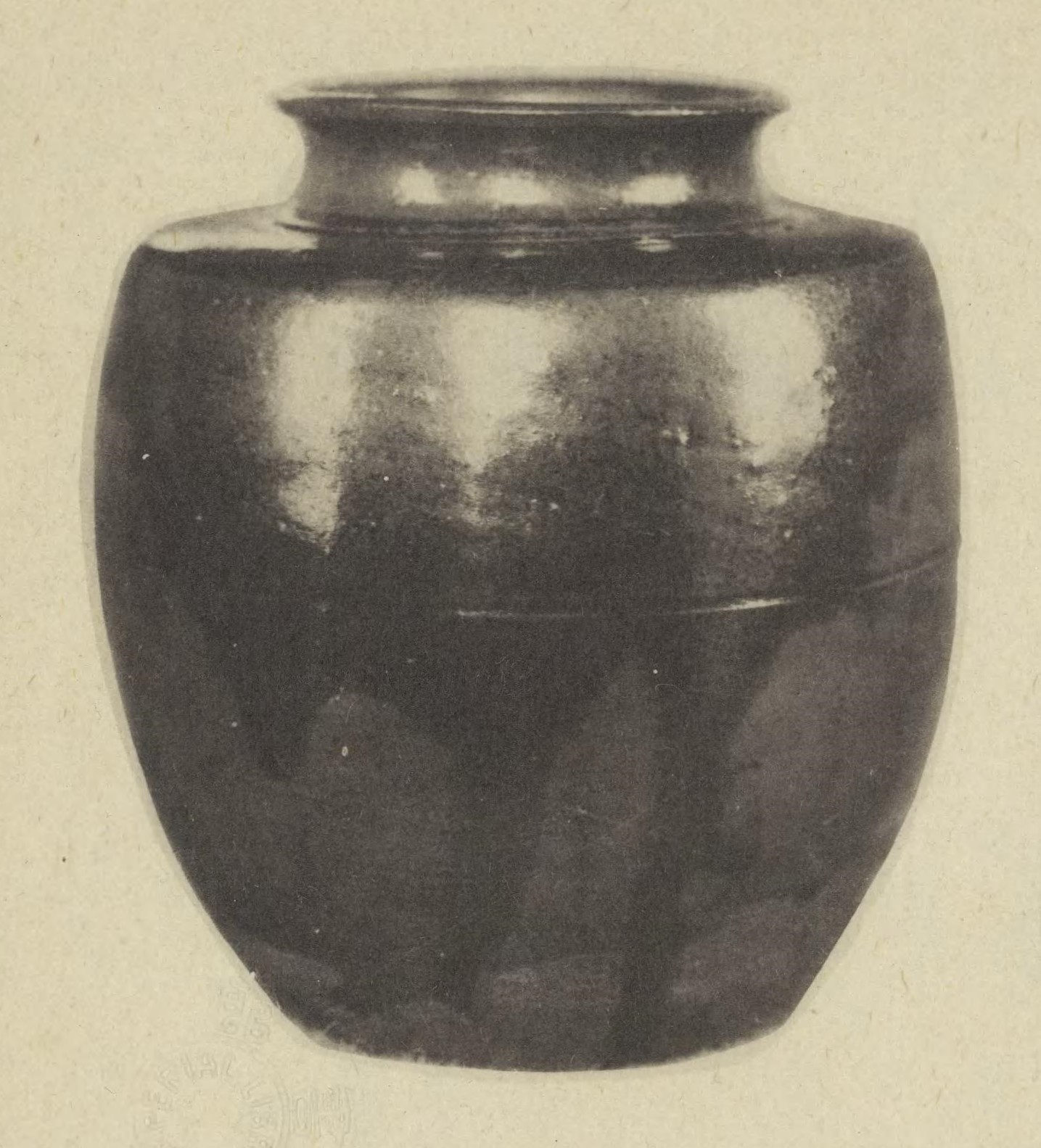
Hatsuhana tea caddy, Important Cultural Property, kept at the Tokugawa Memorial Foundation

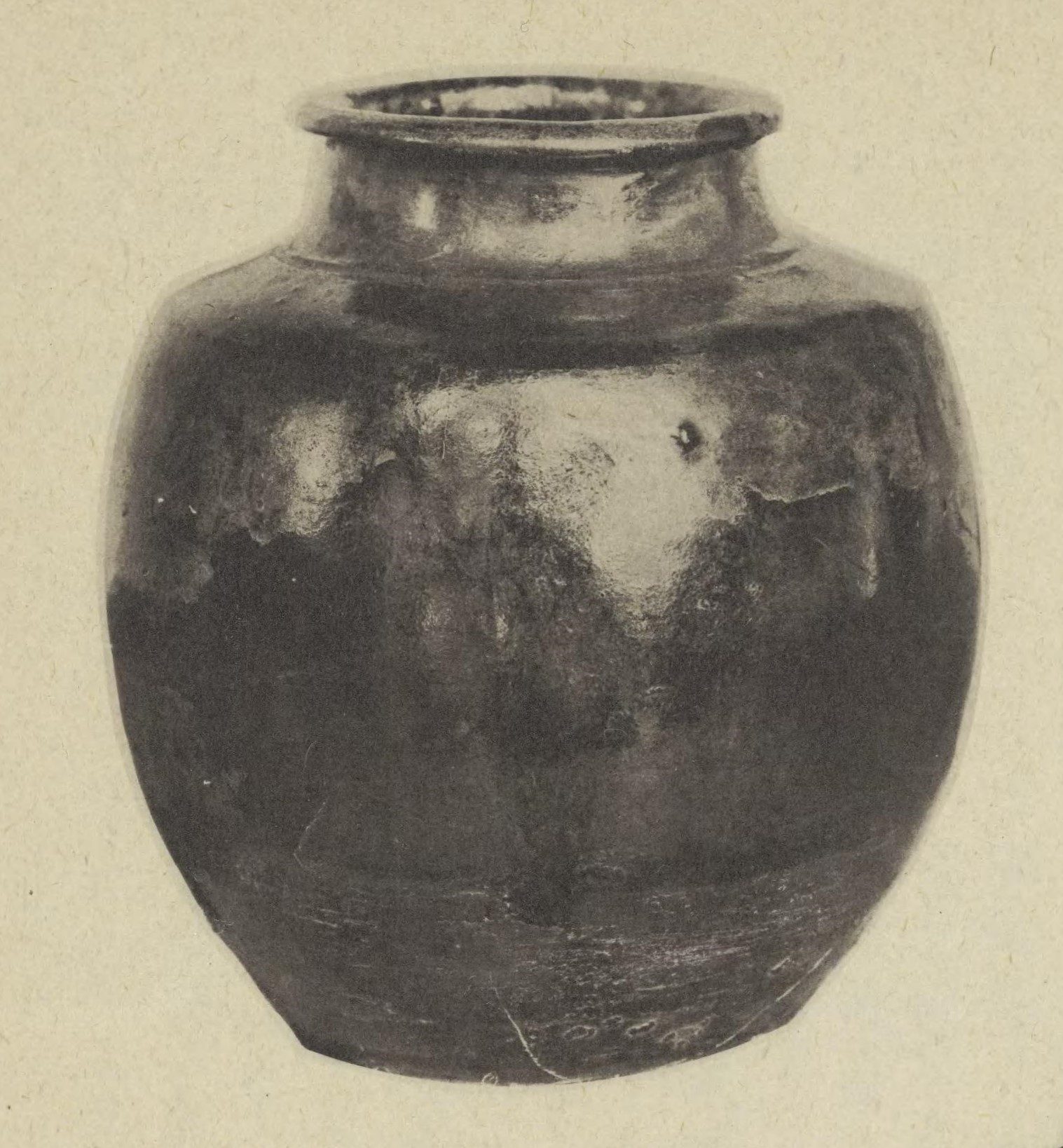
Nitta tea cady

The Special utensils (名物 meibutsu) are historic and precious Japanese tea utensils (茶道具).

They consisted of important tea bowls, kettles, spoons, whisks, etc. The classification came not only from value of the tool itself but also by the possessor and the inheritance.

== History ==
The Ashikaga shōgun accumulated a number of precious items into the treasury called Higashiyama Treasure (東山御物 Higashiyama gomotsu), which also contained a number of tea items. After the fall of the shogunate, the treasury broke up and many of the items were dispersed or lost. Those that have survived today are designed National Treasures by the government.

At the beginning of the Muromachi period, with the rise of the Japanese tea culture, the demand for tea was soaring, and an appreciation began to develop for locally made items and wares. Until then the most appreciated items by the aristocracy were items from China that started with the Tang dynasty. A classic example is Jian ware, which later developed into tenmoku. During the Warring States period, Chinese tea ware and items became a symbol of power for warlords.

The warlord Oda Nobunaga and his successor the regent Toyotomi Hideyoshi collected a number of important items, often from families he either defeated or were given to him as tribute. These added to his prestige and he would exhibit them to guests in his Golden Tea Room and at the Grand Kitano Tea Ceremony.

Items that have survived are inscribed as Important Cultural Property.

Amongst the meibutsu of the Warring States period are the:

- Tsukumo Kaminasu (九十九髪茄子)
- Hiragumo kettle
- Tenka San Nasu (天下三肩衝) refers to the following three eggplant-shaped tea caddies (茶入 chaire): Hatsuhana (初花), Nitta (新田) and Narashiba (楢柴肩衝)
- Shibata Ido chawan
- The three tea jars (茶壺 chatsubo) : Shōka, Mikaduki and Matsushima
- Ankoku-ji tea caddy
- Akaraku Hayafune (赤楽早船)
- Amidadou kettle (阿弥陀堂釜)
- Uesugi hyōtan (上杉瓢箪 "Uesugi gourd"), also known previously as the Ōtomo hyōtan (Ōtomo gourd)
- Chidori no kōro (千鳥香爐) incense burner, made out of celadon and black lacquer lid with a small handle in the shape of a plover (千鳥 chidori)

== In popular culture ==
Hyouge Mono (へうげもの Hepburn: Hyōge Mono, lit. "Jocular Fellow") is a Japanese manga written and illustrated by Yoshihiro Yamada. It was adapted into an anime series in 2011, and includes the meibutsu utensils throughout its story.

== See also ==
- Shimamono
- Mishima ware
- Tapayan
