= Buke shohatto =

Collection of laws issued by Japan's Tokugawa shogunate

The Buke shohatto (武家諸法度, lit. Various Points of Laws for Warrior Houses), commonly known in English as the Laws for the Military Houses, was a collection of edicts issued by Japan's Tokugawa shogunate governing the responsibilities and activities of daimyō (feudal lords) and the rest of the samurai warrior aristocracy. These formed the basis of the bakuhan taisei (shogunate-domains system) which lay at the foundation of the Tokugawa regime. The contents of the edicts were seen as a code of conduct, a description of proper honorable daimyō behavior, and not solely laws which had to be obeyed. By appealing to notions of morality and honor, therefore, the shogunate was able to see its strictures followed despite its inability to enforce them directly.

The edicts were first read to a gathering of daimyō by the retired shōgun Tokugawa Ieyasu, at Fushimi Castle in the seventh lunar month of 1615. They had been compiled by a number of scholars in service to the shogunate including Ishin Sūden and were aimed primarily at limiting the power of the daimyō and thus protecting the shogunate's control over the country.

The reigning shōgun at the time, Ieyasu's son Tokugawa Hidetada, formally promulgated the edicts shortly afterwards, and each successive shogun formally reissued them, reinforcing the restrictions on the daimyō and the control of the shogunate. Through these successive generations, however, the rules developed and changed significantly.

== Articles promulgated in 1615 ==
1. The samurai class should devote itself to pursuits appropriate to the warrior aristocracy, such as archery, swordsmanship, horsemanship, and classical literature.
2. Amusements and entertainments are to be kept within reasonable bounds and expenses for such activities are not to be excessive.
3. The han (feudal domains) are not to harbor fugitives and outlaws.
4. Domains must expel rebels and murderers from their service and from their lands.
5. Daimyō are to keep the social interactions with the people (neither samurai nor commoners) of other domains to a minimal .
6. Limiting the castles for each daimyō to only one. Castles may be repaired, but such activity must be reported to the shogunate. Structural innovations and expansions are forbidden without shogunate permission .
7. The formation of cliques for scheming or conspiracy in neighboring domains must be reported to the shogunate as quickly as possible , as must the expansion of defenses, fortifications, or military forces.
8. Marriages among daimyō and related persons of power or importance must not be arranged privately.
9. Daimyō must present themselves at Edo for service to the shogunate.
10. Conventions regarding formal uniform must be followed.
11. Miscellaneous persons are not to ride in palanquins.
12. Samurai throughout the realm are to practice frugality.
13. Daimyō must select men of ability to serve as administrators and bureaucrats.

The 1615 edict contains the core of the shogunate's philosophy regarding samurai codes of conduct. Similar policies would be imposed upon commoners as well, reissued and reinforced many times over the course of the Edo period.

Several items concern the need for frugality, a concept central to Confucian notions of proper governance. Others relate to sumptuary law, requiring people of certain stations to present themselves as such, in their dress, their modes of transportation, and in other ways.

Some items were included to prevent the formation of alliances against the shogunate, for example, the items regarding social interactions between domains and marriages among the daimyō families. The fudai daimyō bore less power, were more trusted by the shogunate, and could be easily punished by having their domains and privileges rescinded. However, the tozama daimyō were far more powerful and less trusted and the shogunate lacked the strength to directly impose by force its policies within the tozama domains and rightfully feared the military potential of an alliance between multiple tozama domains.

Regulations regarding the construction, expansion, and repair of fortifications also serve to prevent the build-up of military power that could be used against the shogunate, as does a reference to the policy of sankin-kōtai, by which daimyō were required to make elaborate pilgrimages to Edo regularly, to present themselves for service.

== Promulgated in 1635 ==
The edicts were reissued in 1629, and again in 1635, by the third Tokugawa shogun, Iemitsu. The new edicts made clear the shogunate's authority and its desire to assert control. Though there were many changes in this third promulgation, most of the stipulations were simply elaborations on the same themes. Daimyō were banned from quarreling, from forming alliances and parties, and from swearing oaths to one another. The system of sankin kōtai was more fully established at this time and described more specifically in the edict. Sumptuary regulations were elaborated upon.

This year is also quite significant for the implementation of a number of policies which can be grouped under the term kaikin (maritime prohibitions), and which are sometimes referred to as the Sakoku Edicts. Though the restrictions against overseas travel are not themselves mentioned in the 1635 version of the buke shohatto, a number of related policies regarding domestic travel and religion are described.

Some of the new stipulations were as follows:

1. Care must be taken to maintain roads, boats, bridges, and docks in order to facilitate swift communications.
2. Private toll barriers and embargoes are forbidden, as is the elimination of existing ferry routes.
3. Ships which can carry over 500 koku are forbidden to be constructed.
4. Lands owned by Shinto shrines and Buddhist temples must not be taken away from them.
5. Christianity is forbidden.

== Later promulgations ==
The edicts were reissued upon the succession of each of the shōguns. The promulgations under Tokugawa Ietsuna, Tokugawa Tsunayoshi, and Tokugawa Ienobu in 1663, 1683, and 1710 respectively saw significant stylistic changes, though with relatively minor amendments of substance. Among the new stipulations were bans on junshi (ritual suicide following the death of one's lord), abuses of power, the acceptance of bribes, and the suppression of popular opinion, along with stipulations regarding the proper succession of daimyōs within a clan or domain.

The following seven shōguns reissued the buke shohatto in its 1683 form, with only the most minor of stylistic changes. Though these were once pronounced along with the Shoshi hatto (laws for samurai), the latter became largely obsolete after 1683 and was absorbed into the wider body of shogunal orders and prohibitions (the kinrei-ko).
