= Shimamono =

Japanese tea utensils produced outside Japan, Korea and China

Shimamono (島物; "island objects") is a generic term for Japanese tea utensils produced outside Japan, Korea and China, mainly from Southeast Asia.

== History ==
Items from Korea, called kōraimono (高麗物), and from China, called karamono (唐物), are not considered shimamono.

They were imported with ships on trade routes and started becoming popular in the 15th and 16th centuries. The term therefore can be taken literally to mean "island objects". By the time of the rule of the Shōgun Tokugawa Yoshimune, imitation shimamono were also produced in Japan. However, at this point they were called "striped objects", but the pronunciation remained the same. As such they can be counted as part of Japanese pottery and porcelain.

The treatise Tōkikō describes the Japanese pottery trade with Asia and gives detailed descriptions.

== Types ==
Name	Kanji	Origins	Notes	Example image
Rusun ware	呂宋焼	Luzon	Pottery items. The merchant Ruson Sukezaemon (呂宋助左衛門) was particularly connected to the trade in Rusun ware during the rule of Toyotomi Hideyoshi in the 16th century. Grouped together with Mishima ware	
Annan ware	安南焼	Annam	Often blue and white pottery that was later produced in Japan as well. These were originally used as rice bowls but repurposed in Japan for tea. They feature simplified floral motifs as decoration, and their mark is an unusual high foot. A variant is in red and green colours, known as Beni Annan (紅安南). A rare chawan from the 16th century is kept at the Tokugawa Museum in Nagoya and inscribed as an Important Art Object.	Annam ware bowl with floral design, blue underglaze. 15-16th century, Vietnam
Nanban ware	南蛮焼	Southeast Asia	Items from southeast Asia without exact provenience	Nanban ware waste-water receptacle, Toyosuke IV, Toyoraku ware. Edo period, 19th century, Nagoya
Amakawa	アマカワ	Macau	White clay and grayish glaze. Grouped together with Mishima ware	
Mōru / Mo-ru	モウル / モール	Moluccas		
Tō Indu / Tenji	東インドゥ	eastern India		
Kōchi ware	交趾焼	southern China	Developed from Cochin ware from southern China. Generally in colours yellow, green and blue.	Octagonal dishes, Kōchi style, Sanrakuen, Edo period, 19th century
Nekoro	ネコロ	Nicobar Islands		
Taiwan	臺灣	Taiwan	Grouped together with Mishima ware	
Hannera	ハンネラ	Southeast Asia	A type of simple unglazed ware, often reddish or orange in colour	Waste water receptacle. "Hannera" type. Thailand, 17th century
Kinma	蒟醤	Siam or Burma	A style of lacquer ware with finely inlaid patterns	Tray. Lacquer, "Kimma" type. South-Eastern Asia, 17th century
Koma	独楽	Siam	Lacquerware, called "spinning top" (koma) because the colours are painted in concentrical rotating patterns	
Sahari	砂張	Southeast Asia	Is a general term for metalware, specifically an alloy mainly made of copper containing a small amount of silver and lead, mainly adding tin from southeast Asia origin. It appeared from the end of the Muromachi period until the Momoyama period. The products were initially not made as tea utensils, but found entry through tea masters.	

== See also ==
- Special tea tools

== Literature ==
Media related to Shimamono at Wikimedia Commons

- Gakuji, Hasebe (1993). "Nanban and shimamono: exported Southeast- Asian ceramics for Japan : 16th ... - Hasebe Gakuji - Google Books". books.google.com.
