= Higashiyama Treasure =

Japanese artifacts

The Higashiyama Treasure (東山御物 Higashiyama gyomotsu, Higashiyama gomotsu) was a collection of important and valuable artefacts by the Ashikaga shogunate. It is named after the residence of the 8th shōgun of the Ashikaga shogunate, Ashikaga Yoshimasa (1436–1490), in the eastern hills (東山 Higashiyama) of the capital city Kyoto. The items consisted mostly of karamono (Chinese items) and consisted of ceramics, lacquerware, paintings, calligraphy, and others. It represented the pinnacle of Higashiyama culture.

After the fall of the shogunate, the treasures were dispersed and some survived and are listed as either National Treasures or objects of Important Cultural Property.

The collecting of important items was continued by the warlords Oda Nobunaga and Toyotomi Hideyoshi, who laid great emphasis on Japanese tea utensils as chadō was developed. These were known as special tea utensils (名物 meibutsu, 大名物 Ōmeibutsu).

== List of existing items ==
- Summer Mountain (夏景山水図), National Treasure, Kuon-ji, Minobu, Yamanashi
- Autumn Landscape (秋景山水図), National Treasure, Konchi-in, Kyoto
- Winter Landscape (冬景山水図), National Treasure, Konchi-in, Kyoto
- Sakyamuni descending the mountain after asceticism / Snowy Landscape (出山釈迦図・雪景山水図), National Treasure, Tokyo National Museum
- Han-shan and Shi-de (寒山拾得図), Important Cultural Property, Tokyo National Museum
- (紙本墨画布袋図), Important Cultural Property, private collection
- (紙本墨画老子像), Important Cultural Property, Okayama Prefectural Museum of Art
- Insects and Flower Plants (草虫図), Important Cultural Property, Tokyo National Museum
- Bamboos and Insects (竹虫図), Important Cultural Property, Tokyo National Museum
- Plum Flower and Two Sparrows (梅花双雀図), Important Cultural Property, Tokyo National Museum

Name	Author	Remarks	Date	Format	Present location	Image
Summer Mountain (絹本著色夏景山水図, kenpon chakushoku kakei sansui-zu)	attributed to Hu Zhifu	—	Southern Song dynasty, 13th century	Hanging scroll, color on silk, 118.5 cm × 52.7 cm (46.7 in × 20.7 in)	Kuon-ji, Minobu, Yamanashi	Landscape with a mountain, tree and a person carrying a stick.
Autumn and Winter Landscapes (絹本著色秋景冬景山水図, kenpon chakushoku shūkei tōkei sansuizu)	attributed to Emperor Huizong of Song	—	Southern Song dynasty, 12th century	Two hanging scrolls, color on silk, each 128.2 cm × 55.2 cm (50.5 in × 21.7 in)	Konchi-in, Kyoto	Landscape with a priest on a mountain road.
Sakyamuni descending the mountain after asceticism (絹本墨画淡彩出山釈迦図, kenpon bokuga tansai shussan shuka zu) (I) Snowy Landscape (絹本墨画淡彩雪景山水図, kenpon bokuga tansai sekkei sansui zu) (II) Snowy Landscape (絹本墨画淡彩雪景山水図, kenpon bokuga tansai sekkei sansui zu) purportedly by Liang Kai (III)	Liang Kai	"III" was cut later to make the three paintings into a triad likely during the time of Ashikaga Yoshimitsu. Marked with the zakkeshitsu-in seal found on Chinese paintings imported to Japan by the Ashikaga. Originally designated as three distinct National Treasures, they came to be designated as a single National Treasure in 2007.	Southern Song dynasty, 13th century	Three hanging scrolls, ink and light color on silk, 110.3 cm × 49.7 cm (43.4 in × 19.6 in) (I), 110.8 cm × 50.1 cm (43.6 in × 19.7 in) (II), 117.6 cm × 52.0 cm (46.3 in × 20.5 in) (III)	Tokyo National Museum, Tokyo	Tall and narrow painting of a landscape with mountains and vegetation. In the bottom left there are two very small horsemen.

== See also ==
- List of National Treasures of Japan
