= Shingei =

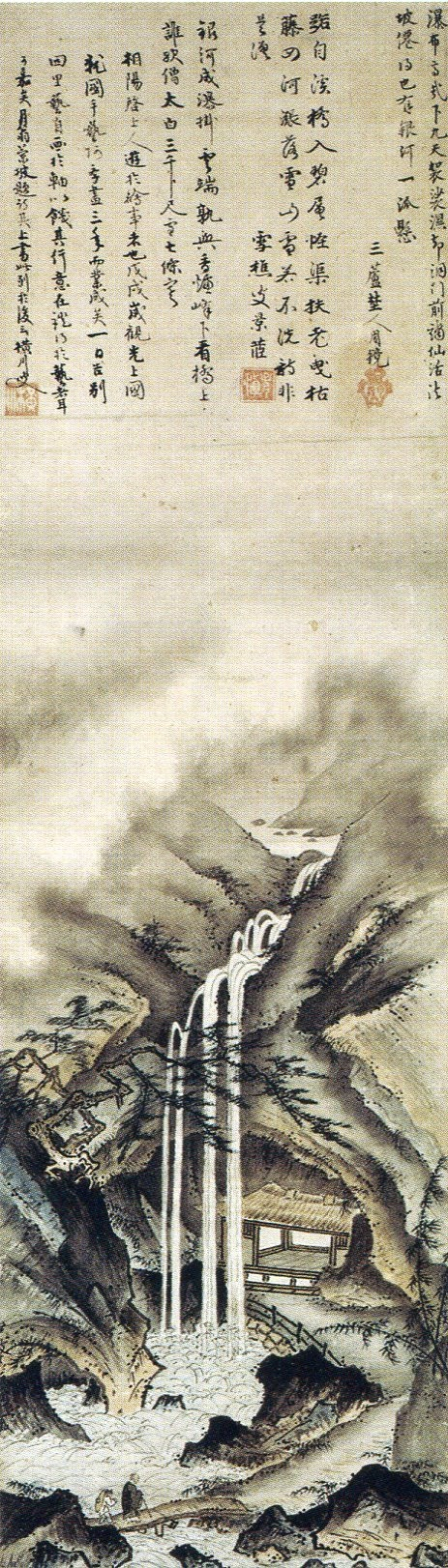
Shingei Geiami - Viewing a Waterfall. Exhibited at the Nezu Museum, Tokyo.

Shingei (真芸), also called Geiami (芸阿弥) or Shingei Geiami (真芸芸阿弥) (1431–1485) was a Japanese painter and cultural figure during the Muromachi period in the service of the Ashikaga shōgunate. Born into a family of renowned artists and curators known as the Ami family, he succeeded his father Nōami (Shinno) as curator of the Ashikaga art collection and developed his own career as a painter. He is known for his yamato-e paintings executed in Sumi-e (ink wash) style, continuing the tradition of Tenshō Shūbun. Together with his father and his son Sōami, he was part of the group referred to as the San-Ami ("Three Amis").

== Biography and Career ==
Shingei was active not only as a painter but also as a participant in the broader cultural activities of the Muromachi shogunate. As a member of the dōbōshū (同朋衆) under Ashikaga Yoshimasa, he contributed to a variety of artistic and aesthetic responsibilities, including scroll mounting, interior room arrangement (zashiki kazari), and the composition of linked-verse poetry (renga, 連歌) His position within the court placed him in proximity to cultural decision-making and ceremonial aesthetics at the highest level of Ashikaga governance.

== Notable Works: Viewing a Waterfall and more ==
In 1480 (Bunmei 12), Shingei completed the hanging scroll Viewing a Waterfall (観瀑図, Kanpaku-zu), which was presented as a parting gift to his student Kenkō Shōkei, a monk from Kenchō-ji Temple in Kamakura, upon the conclusion of his training. The painting includes colophons by three Zen monks from the Kyoto Gozan (Five Mountains), notably Getsuo Shukyo, and bears the signature "Gakusō Shingei, 50 years old" along with Shingei's red seal.

Viewing a Waterfall is the only authenticated surviving work attributed to Shingei. The painting is held by the Nezu Museum in Tokyo and is considered a key example of his mature style. The painting incorporates elements from the landscape traditions of Chinese Song Dynasty painters Ma Yuan and Xia Gui, but applies them in a manner consistent with the Japanese ink painting aesthetics of the period. The work has been cited as an early influence on the stylistic developments later associated with the Kanō school of painting.

In addition to his work as a painter, Shingei composed linked-verse poetry. Two of his renga verses were included in the Shinsen Tsukubashū, a poetry anthology compiled during the Muromachi period. His inclusion in the collection suggests participation in the literary culture of the Ashikaga court, alongside his visual and curatorial roles.
