= Kanō Muneshige =

Japanese samurai

Kanō Muneshige 狩野宗茂
- Born: Unknown
- Died: Unknown, after 1193
- Occupation: samurai
- Father: Kudō Shigemitsu
- Relatives: Kanō Yukimitsu (brother)

Kanō Muneshige (狩野 宗茂) was a Japanese samurai of the Kamakura period. He was the son of Kudō Shigemitsu, the founder of the Kanō clan. He is said to be an ancestor of Kanō Masanobu, the founder of the Kanō school of painting.

== Life ==
Born as a son of Kudō Shigemitsu, the fourth son of Kudō Suketaka (Itō Ietsugu), he was the sixth head of Fujiwara Nanke's Kudō clan. Muneshige served Minamoto no Yoritomo during the Genpei War.

In May 1193, Muneshige and Hōjō Tokimasa were in charge of the preparatory construction of mansions at the site of the Fuji no Makigari, a grand hunting event planned by Yoritomo. He then participated in the event later that month. After the brothers Soga Sukenari and Tokimune killed their father's killer, Kudō Suketsune, during the Revenge of the Soga Brothers incident on the last night of the hunting event, Muneshige was present at Tokimune's interrogation.

Ever since Muneshige, his descendants were called "Kanō-suke" (suke being one of the titles for kokushi officials) for generations. They served as kokushi officials in the Izu Province. The name "Kanō" comes from the Kanō Manor in Izu Province (currently near Kanō River in Odairakakigi, Izu, Shizuoka Prefecture), where the Kudō clan was based.

== Genealogy ==
Kanō Masanobu, the founder of the Kanō school and the Kanō family, a family of distinguished Japanese painters, is said to be a descendant of Kanō Muneshige.
