= Higashiyama culture =

Japanese cultural period

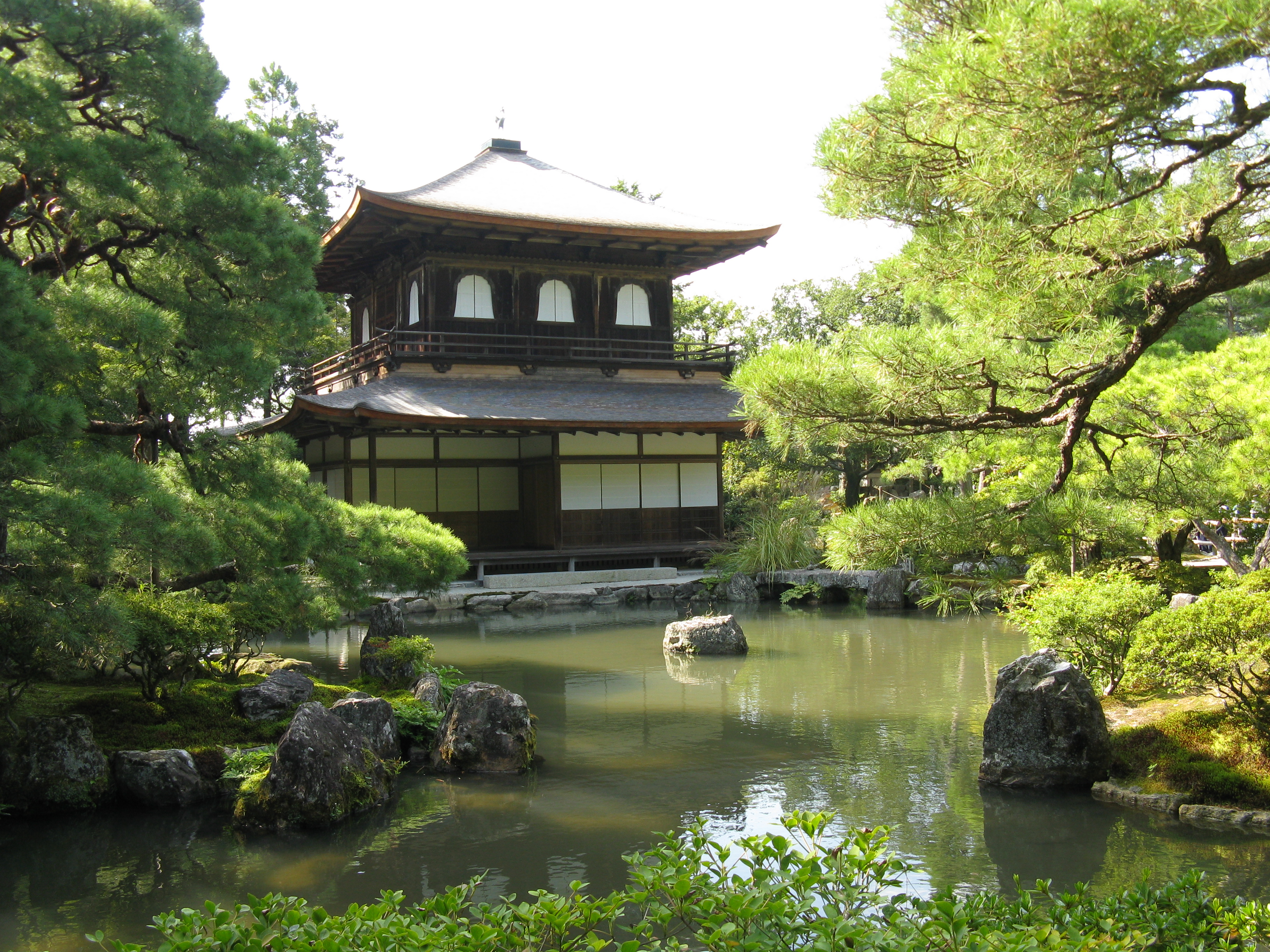
Silver Pavilion (Ginkaku) and garden of Jishō-ji, the residence of the Ashikaga shōgun in the Higashiyama hills of Kyoto

The Higashiyama culture (東山文化 Higashiyama bunka) is a segment of Japanese culture that includes innovations in architecture, the visual arts and theatre during the late Muromachi period. It originated and was promoted in the 15th century by the shōgun Ashikaga Yoshimasa, after he retired to his villa in the eastern hills (東山 Higashiyama) of capital city Kyoto.

== History ==
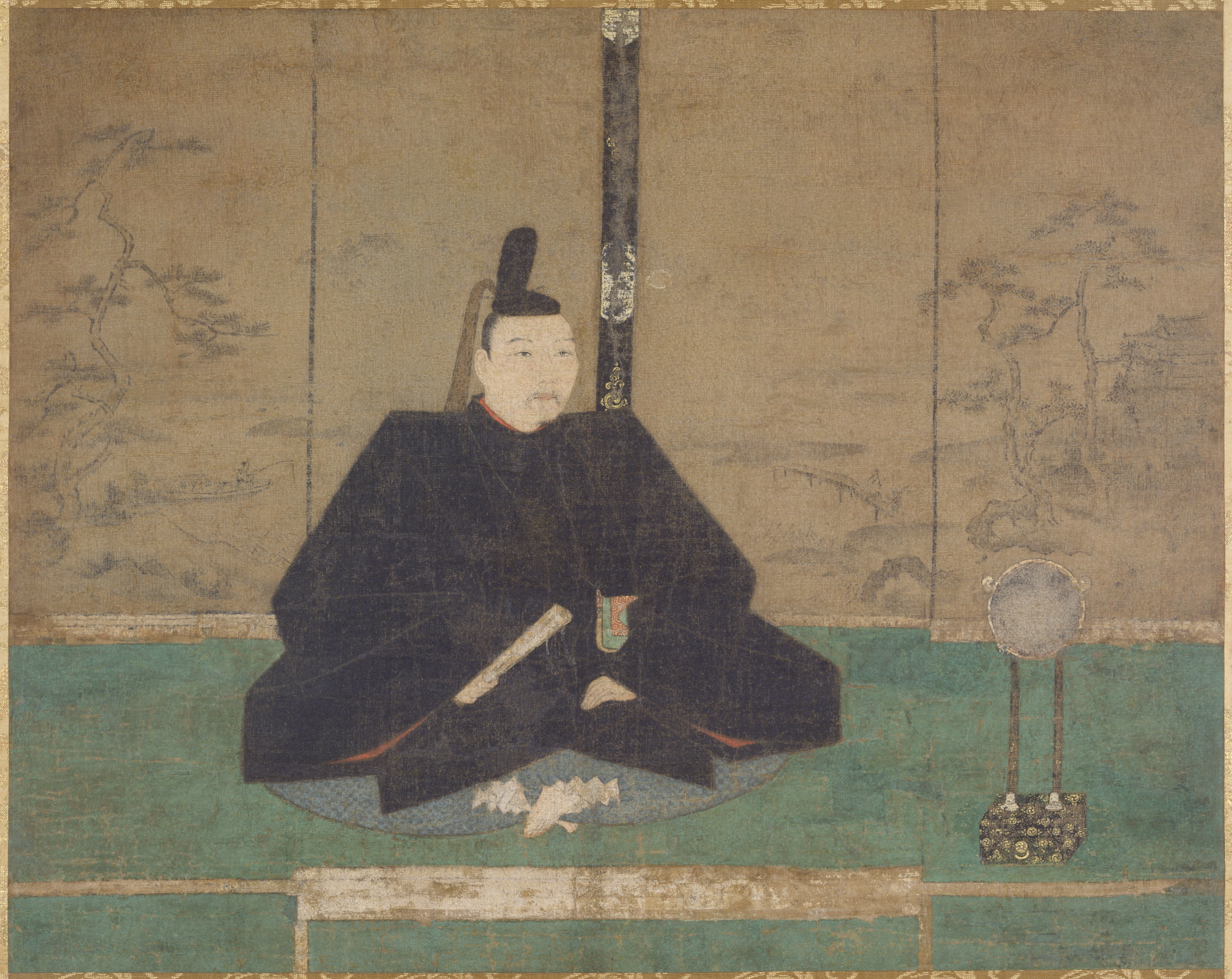
Shōgun Ashikaga Yoshimasa, who developed the Higashiyama culture (painting by Tosa Mitsunobu, latter half of 15th century)

The Ashikaga Shogunate of the 14th century renewed diplomatic relations with Ming Dynasty China under Yoshinori, in an overtly vassal relationship. Through access to Chinese culture, the Shogunate imported the latest cultural trends through the Shogun Yoshimasa but with a distinctly Japanese aesthetic. This is what became known as the "Higashiyama Culture" due to the centrality of Yoshimasa's influence, and named after the district in Kyoto where he built his retreat. Yoshimasa did not single-handedly contribute to the aesthetic, but recruited artistic talents, sponsoring them, and provided valuable critique.

Based largely on the ideals and aesthetics of Zen Buddhism, especially those temples under the Five Mountain System, and the concept of wabi-sabi, Higashiyama culture centered on the development of chadō (Japanese tea ceremony), ikebana (flower arranging), Noh drama, and sumi-e ink painting. Much of what is commonly seen today as Japanese Zen aesthetics originated in this period. Higashiyama culture is often contrasted with Kitayama bunka (北山文化), the "Kitayama Culture" came earlier in the Muromachi period. In this comparison Kinkaku-ji, representative of Kitayama culture is compared with Ginkaku-ji, representative of Higashiyama culture.

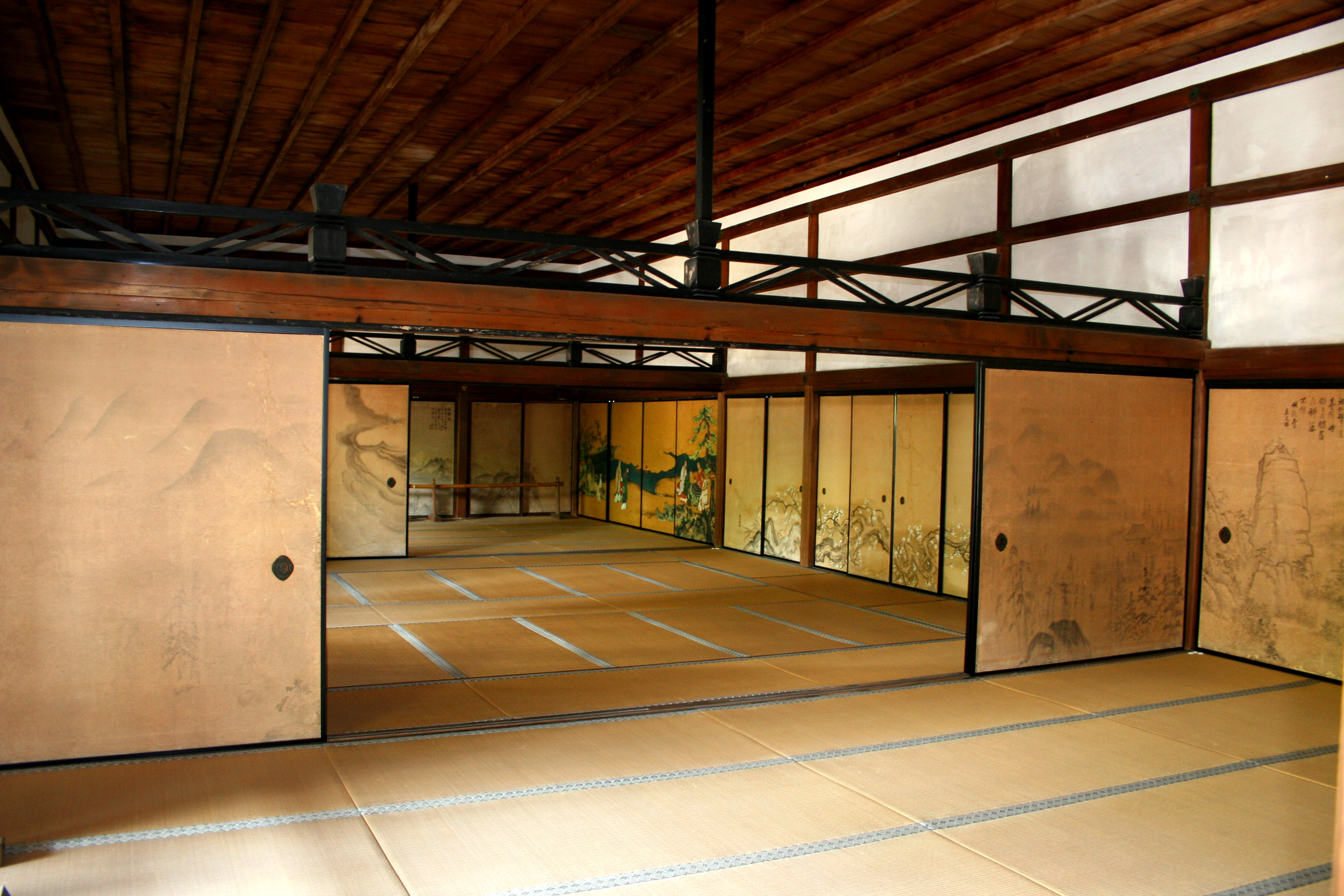
Interior of the Kuri, the main building of the Ryōan-ji, featuring elements of traditional Japanese style culture such as washitsu (fusuma, tatami, and shōji) which were stylized in the Higashiyama culture

Yoshimasa's retirement villa was turned into the temple Ginkaku-ji (the Temple of the Silver Pavilion) after his death. It is situated in Kyoto's Sakyō-ku, and was the center of the Higashiyama cultural outgrowth and known for its Zen and wabi-sabi aesthetics. The retired shogun invited many artists, poets, and court nobles to his villa, encouraging the development of their arts. A vast and priceless collection of artifacts came together, which was known as the Higashiyama Treasure.

== Notable people ==
Among the figures who influenced the Higashiyama culture are the following:

- Sesshū Tōyō - a Zen-Buddhist monk and painter
- Kanō Masanobu - founder of the Kanō school of painting.
- Sen no Rikyū - a master of the Japanese tea ceremony.
- Zeami Motokiyo - a master playwright of Noh theater.
- Sōgi - a master of renga poetry

== Examples ==
The Tōgu-Dō building structure includes a shoin-style room called the Dōjinsai. It originally had a fireplace built into the floor, and due to this, the Dōjinsai is considered the earliest extant example of a room designed for use as a tea room.

There were many architectural innovations in this period, exhibited in the Ginkaku-ji in particular, which would later become core elements in the shoin style of 17th century architecture. One of these elements was the tokonoma, a small alcove in which scrolls are hung, and flowers or other small articles are placed to enhance the aesthetic feel of the room. The great ink-painter Sesshū Tōyō spent much time at the Ginkaku-ji, and this period also saw the birth of the Kanō school of Japanese painting as well as an early version of the chanoyu tea ceremony. Tea ceremonies would be further formalized by Sen no Rikyū in the 16th century.

== Important dates ==
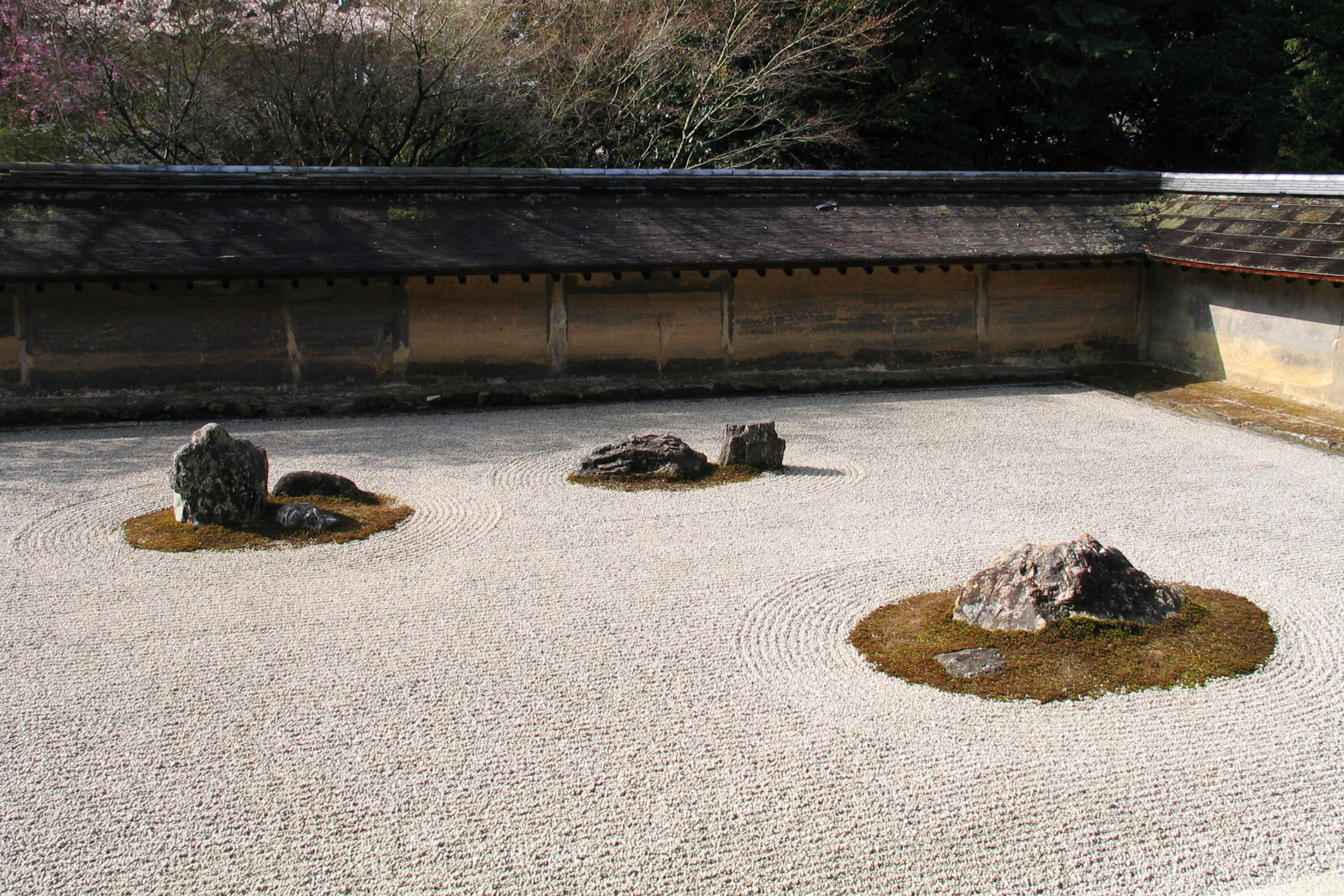
Karesansui of Ryōan-ji

Notable dates within this period include:

- February 21, 1482 (Bummei 14, 4th day of the 2nd month): Construction of the Silver Pavilion commenced.
- January 27, 1490 (Entoku 2, 7th day of the 1st month): The former-Shogun Yoshimasa died at age 56 in his Higashiyama-dono estate, which marked the beginning of the end of Higashiyama bunka.

== Examples ==
Examples of Higashiyama culture include:

=== Architecture ===
- Ginkaku and Garden of Jishō-ji
- Karesansui of Ryōan-ji
- Karesansui of Daisen-in

=== Calligraphy and painting ===
- View of Ama-no-Hashidate by Sesshū (Kyoto National Museum)
- Zhou Maoshu Appreciating Lotuses, a hanging scroll by Kanō Masanobu (Kyūshū National Museum)
- Seikōji engi emaki by Tosa Mitsunobu (Tokyo National Museum)
"View of Ama-no-Hashidate" by Sesshū

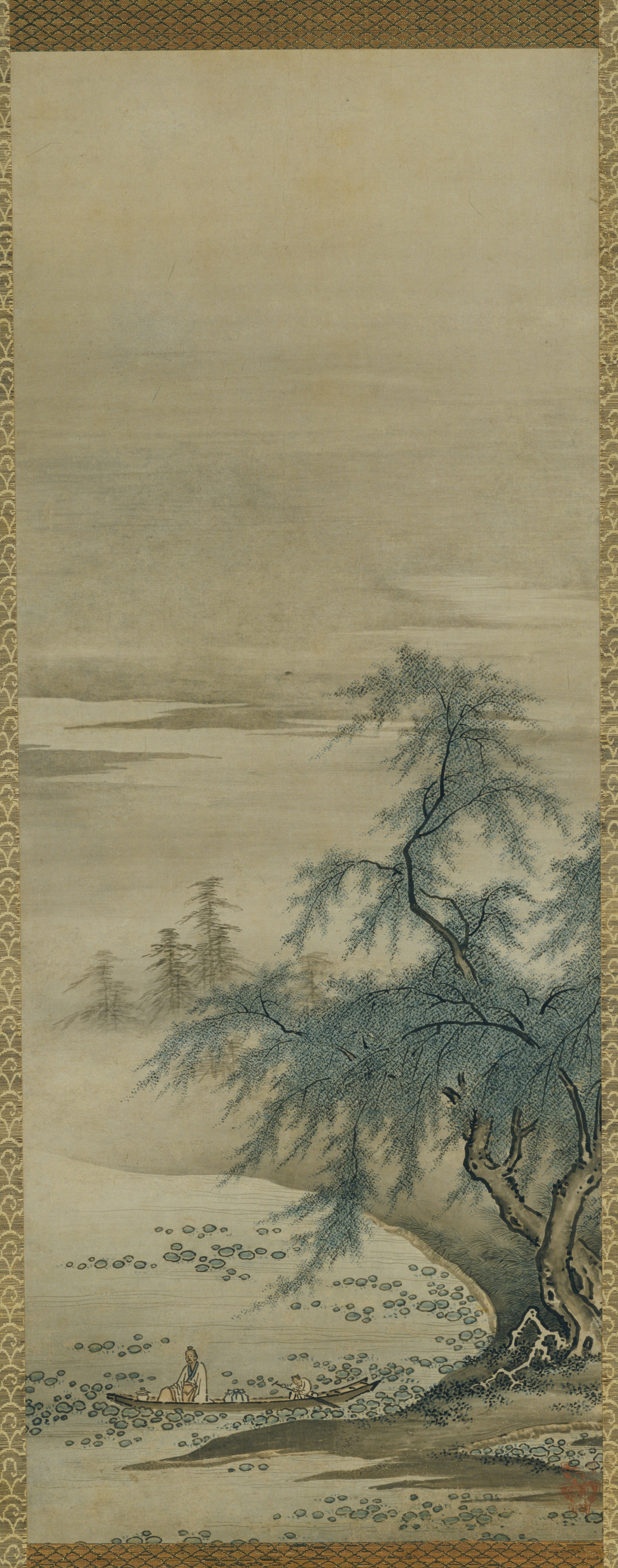
"Zhou Maoshu Appreciating Lotuses", a hanging scroll by Kanō Masanobu

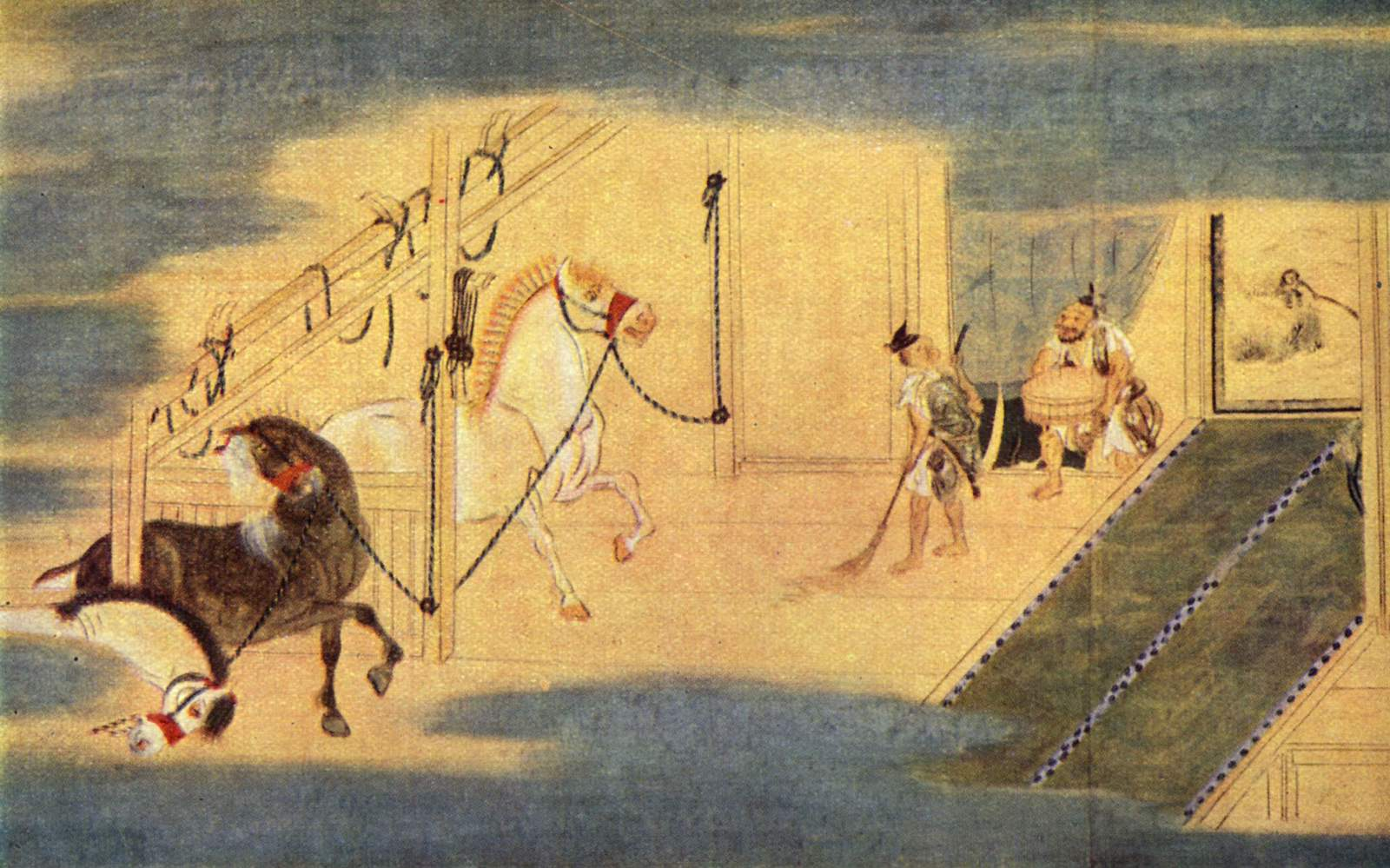
"Seikōji engi emaki" by Tosa Mitsunobu

== See also ==
- Culture of Japan
- Japanese art
- National Treasures of Japan
- Japanese architecture
