= Ginkaku-ji =

Zen buddhist temple in Kyoto, Japan

Coordinates: 35°01′36″N 135°47′54″E

Jishō-ji
- 慈照寺
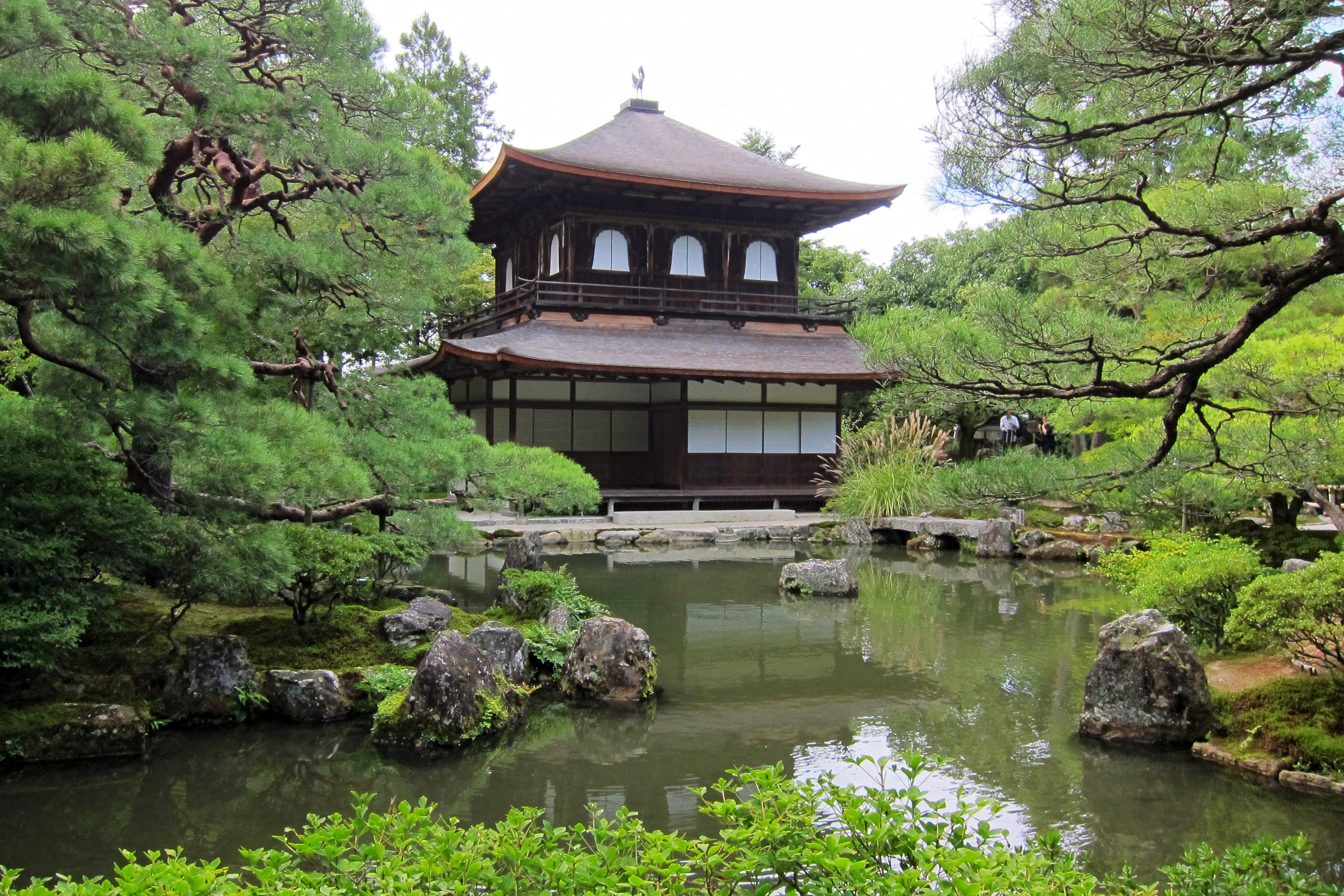
- The kannonden at Jishō-ji, commonly known as the Silver Pavilion (Ginkaku)

Religion
- Affiliation: Zen, Rinzai sect, Shōkoku-ji school
- Deity: Shaka Nyorai (Śākyamuni)

Location
- Location: 2 Ginkakuji-chō, Sakyō-ku, Kyōto, Kyoto Prefecture
- Country: Japan
- Interactive map of Jishō-ji

Architecture
- Founder: Ashikaga Yoshimasa
- Completed: 1490

Website
- Japanese Website

Ginkaku-ji (銀閣寺; Japanese pronunciation: [ɡʲiꜜŋ.ka.kɯ.dʑi], lit. 'Temple of the Silver Pavilion'), officially named Jishō-ji (慈照寺; [dʑi.ɕoː.dʑi], lit. 'Temple of Shining Mercy'), is a Zen temple in the Sakyo ward of Kyoto, Japan. It is one of the constructions that represent the Higashiyama Culture of the Muromachi period.

== History ==
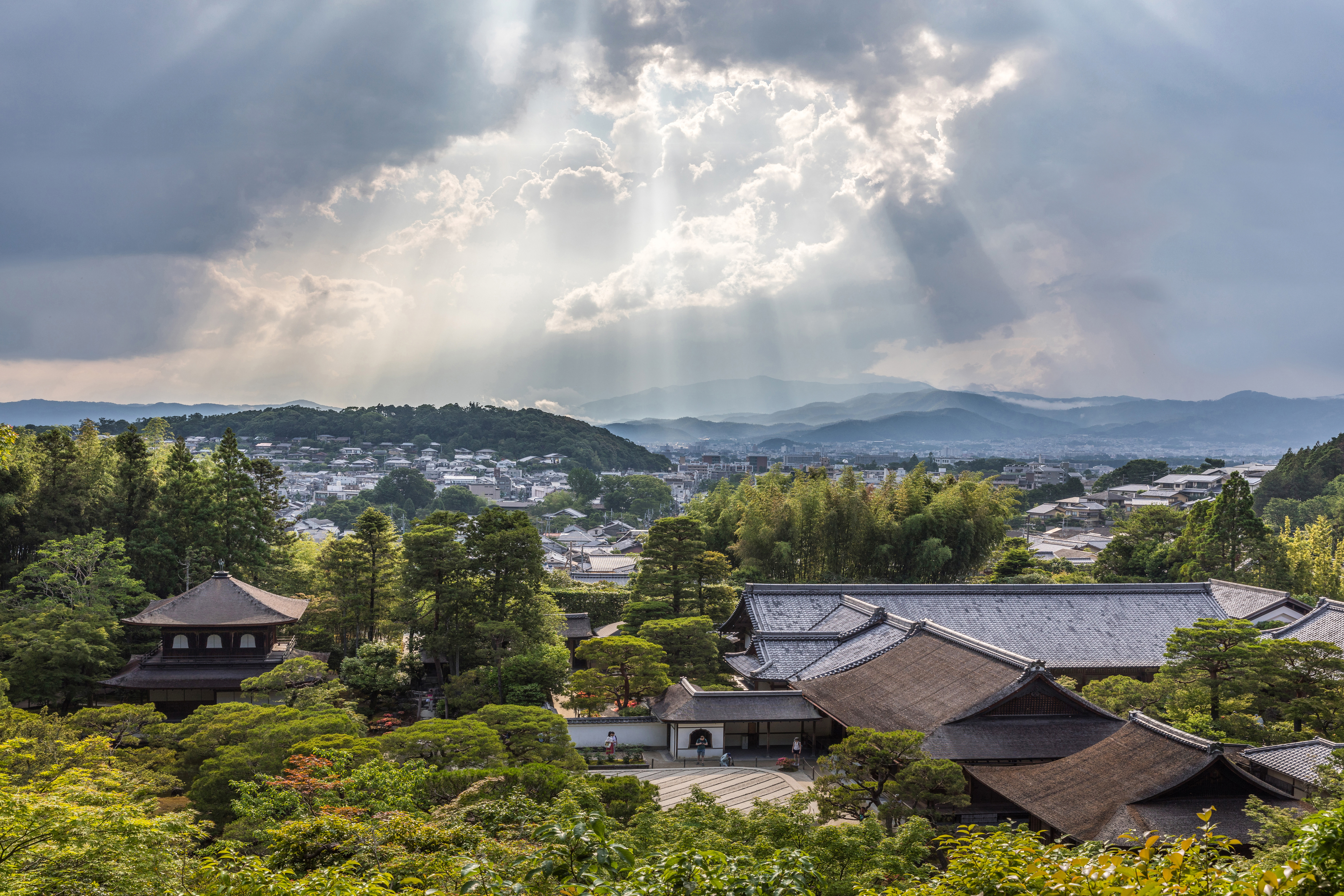
View of Ginkaku-ji and Tōgudō

Ashikaga Yoshimasa initiated plans for creating a retirement villa and gardens as early as 1460, and it functioned as a pleasure villa for the shoguns to rest from their administrative duties. After his death, Yoshimasa arranged for this property to become a Zen temple under the name Jishō-ji. The temple is today associated with the Shokoku-ji branch of Rinzai Zen.

The two-storied Kannon-den (観音殿; Kannon hall), is the main temple structure. Its construction began February 21, 1482 (Bummei 14, fourth day of the second month). For the structure's design, Yoshimasa sought to emulate the golden Kinkaku-ji, which had been commissioned by his grandfather Ashikaga Yoshimitsu. It is popularly known as Ginkaku, the "Silver Pavilion," because of the initial plans to cover its exterior in silver foil, but this familiar nickname dates back only as far as the Edo period (1600–1868).

During the Ōnin War, construction was halted. Despite Yoshimasa's intention to cover the structure with a distinctive silver foil overlay, this work was delayed so long that the plans were never realized before Yoshimasa's death. The present appearance of the structure is understood to be the same as when Yoshimasa himself last saw it. This "unfinished" appearance illustrates one of the aspects of "wabi-sabi" quality.

Like Kinkaku-ji, Ginkaku-ji was originally built to serve as a place of rest and solitude for the Shōgun. During his reign as Shōgun, Ashikaga Yoshimasa inspired a new outpouring of traditional culture, which came to be known as Higashiyama Bunka (the Culture of the Eastern Mountain). Having retired to the villa, it is said Yoshimasa sat in the pavilion, contemplating the calm and beauty of the gardens as the Ōnin War worsened and Kyoto was burned to the ground.

In 1485, Yoshimasa became a Zen Buddhist monk. After his death on January 27, 1490 (Entoku 2, seventh day of the first month), the villa and gardens became a Buddhist temple complex, renamed Jishō-ji after Yoshimasa's Buddhist name.

After extensive restoration, which started in February 2008, Ginkaku-ji is again in full glory to visit. The garden and temple complex are open to the public. There is still no silver foil used. After much discussion, it was decided not to refinish the lacquer to the original state. The lacquer finish was the source of the original silver appearance of the temple, with the reflection of the silver water of the pond on the lacquer finish.

== Garden ==
In addition to the temple's famous building, the property features wooded grounds covered with a variety of mosses. This Japanese garden was supposedly designed by the great landscape artist Sōami.

In the later periods of Japanese garden history, fine stones were transported from a ruined or impoverished garden to a new one. According to the book Landscape design: A Cultural and Architectural History by Elizabeth Barlow Rogers, "In 1474, following his retirement from the shogunate, Yoshimasa (1436-1490), had some of the stones and pine trees of the Flowery Palace and Muromachi Hall, both of which had been devastated by civil warfare, removed to his villa retreat at the base of Higashiyama (the Eastern Hills). There he lived from 1438 until his death, when the villa was converted to the Zen temple, Jisho-ji, or Ginkakuji (the Temple of the Silver Pavilion), as it is better known."

The Zen culture is not entirely represented in this garden because it was financed by the shogunate as a retreat and the primary use was aesthetic enjoyment. Instead of being designed by and for the use of monks, practitioners of zazen, or seated meditation.

Ginkakuji was constructed in relation to its surroundings. This is described in the Journal of Asian Studies by Ichito Ishida and Delmer M. Brown, "The southeast corner of the first floor has openings in the walls, since a pond is located on that corner of the building, beyond which the moon rises between the peaks of Higashiyama. And since a lake extending northeastward reflected light that suffices even for reading, the room on the northeast corner has been planned as a library. Therefore, the natural objects do not merely surround the building, twisting it out of shape but supply intrinsic motivation for the structural design." The sand garden of Ginkaku-ji has become particularly well known; and the carefully formed pile of sand which is said to symbolize Mount Fuji is an essential element in the garden.

== Gallery ==
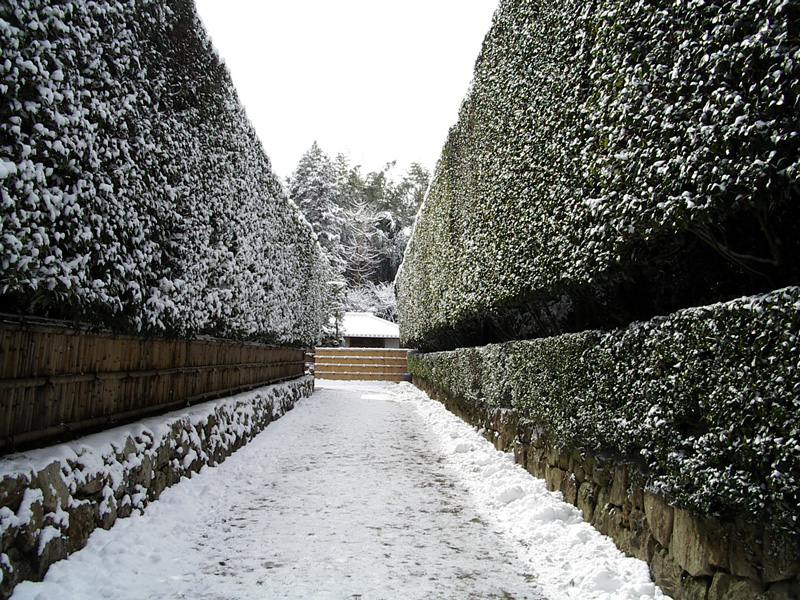
Entrance way of the temple

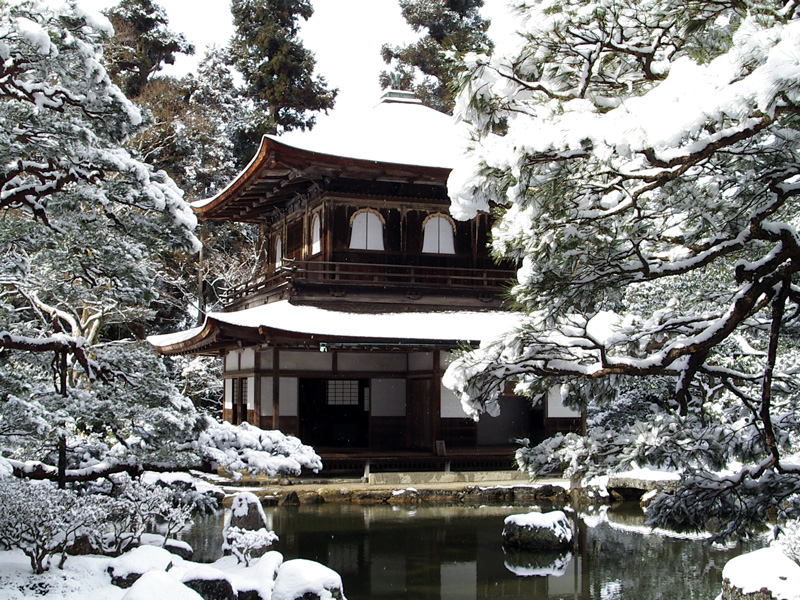
Ginkaku-ji temple on a snowy day

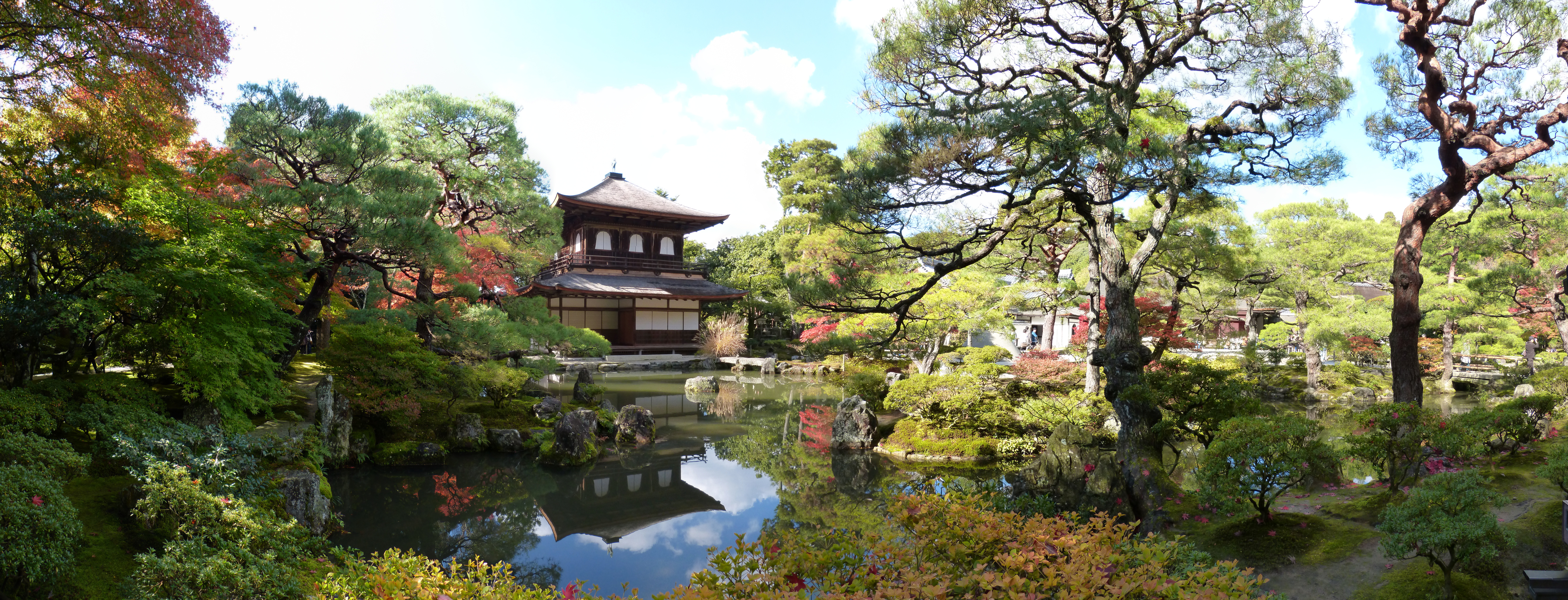
View from the pond in autumn

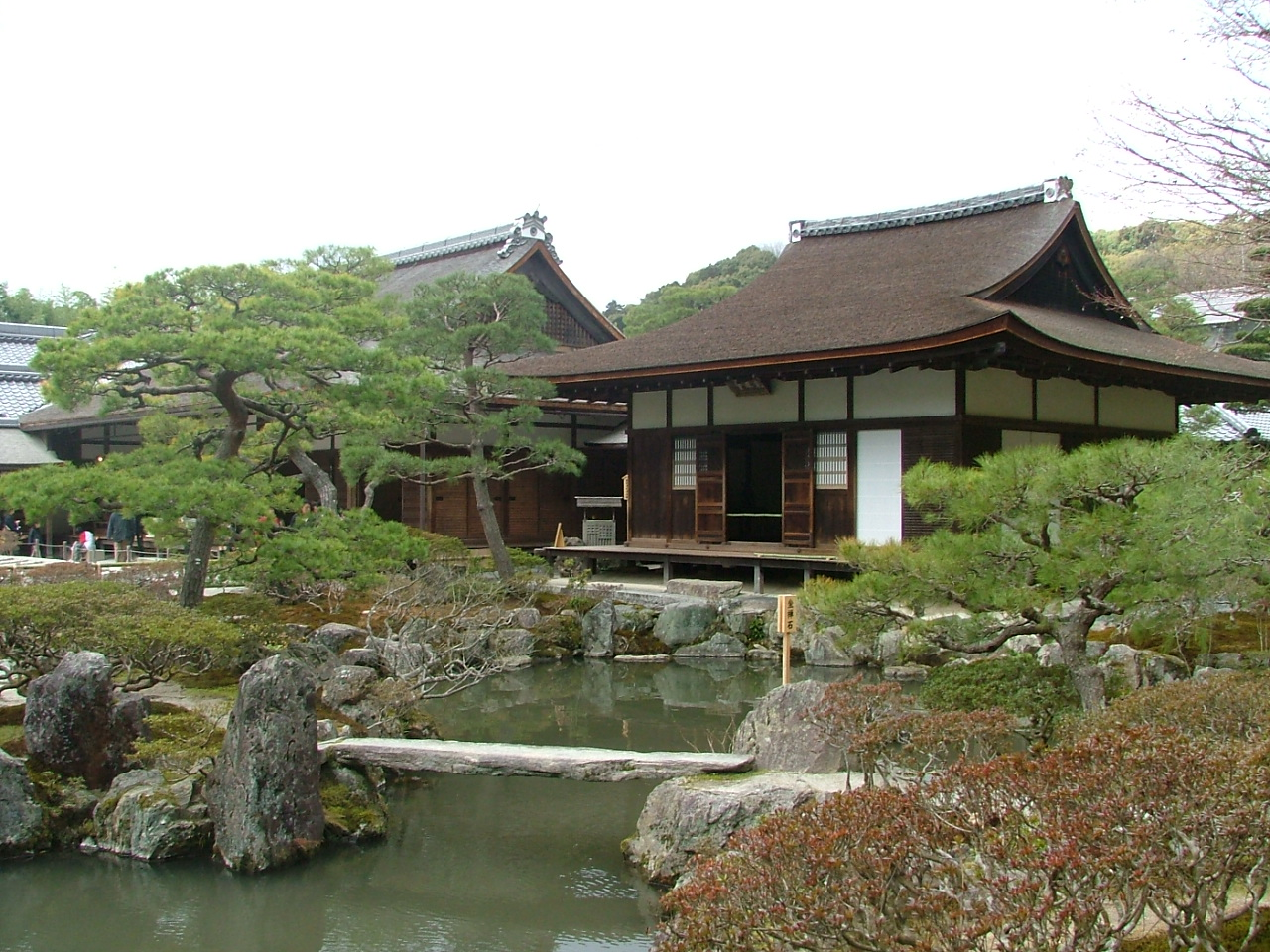
Tōgu-dō (1486), a National Treasure

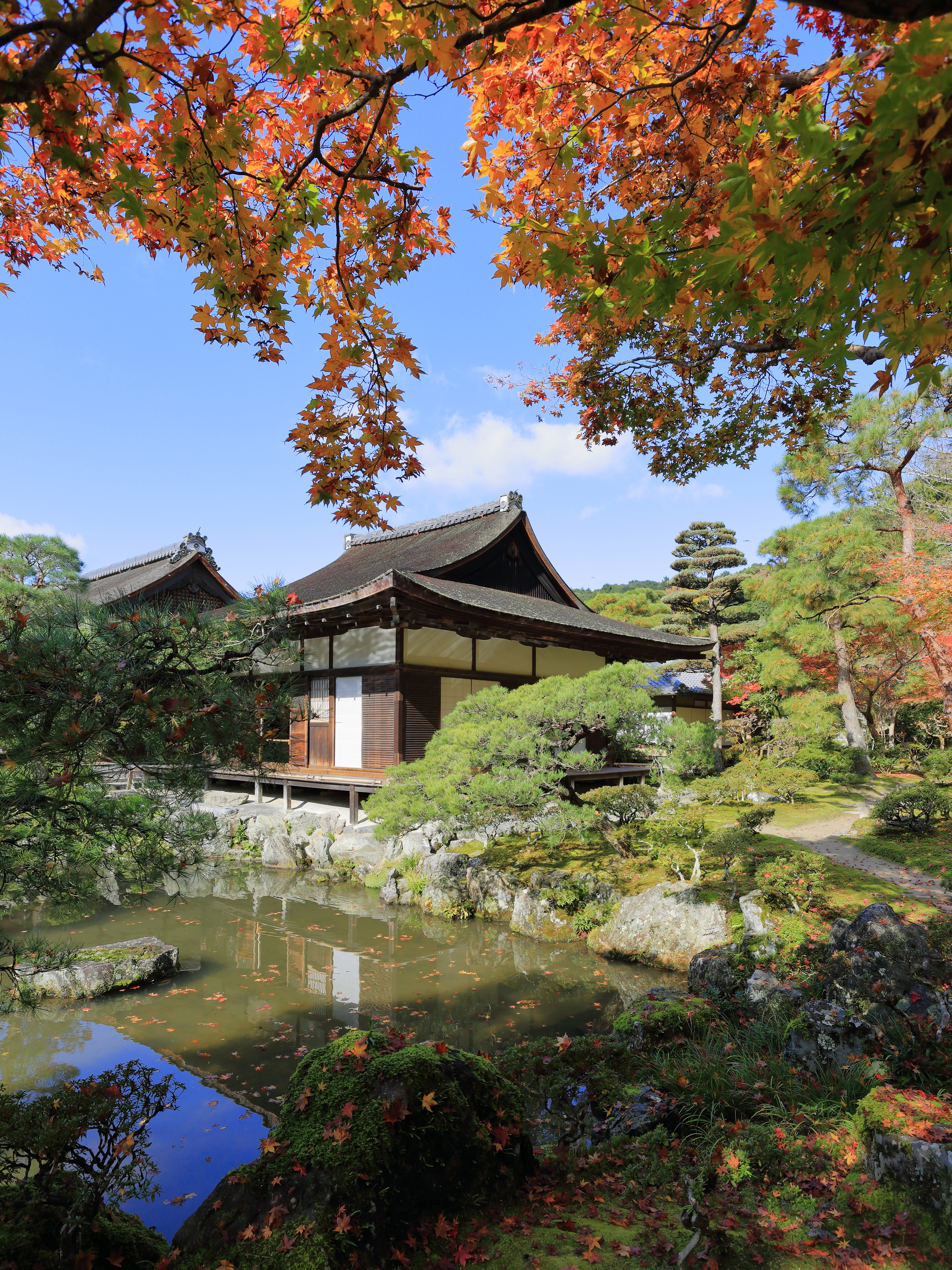
Tōgudō in autumn

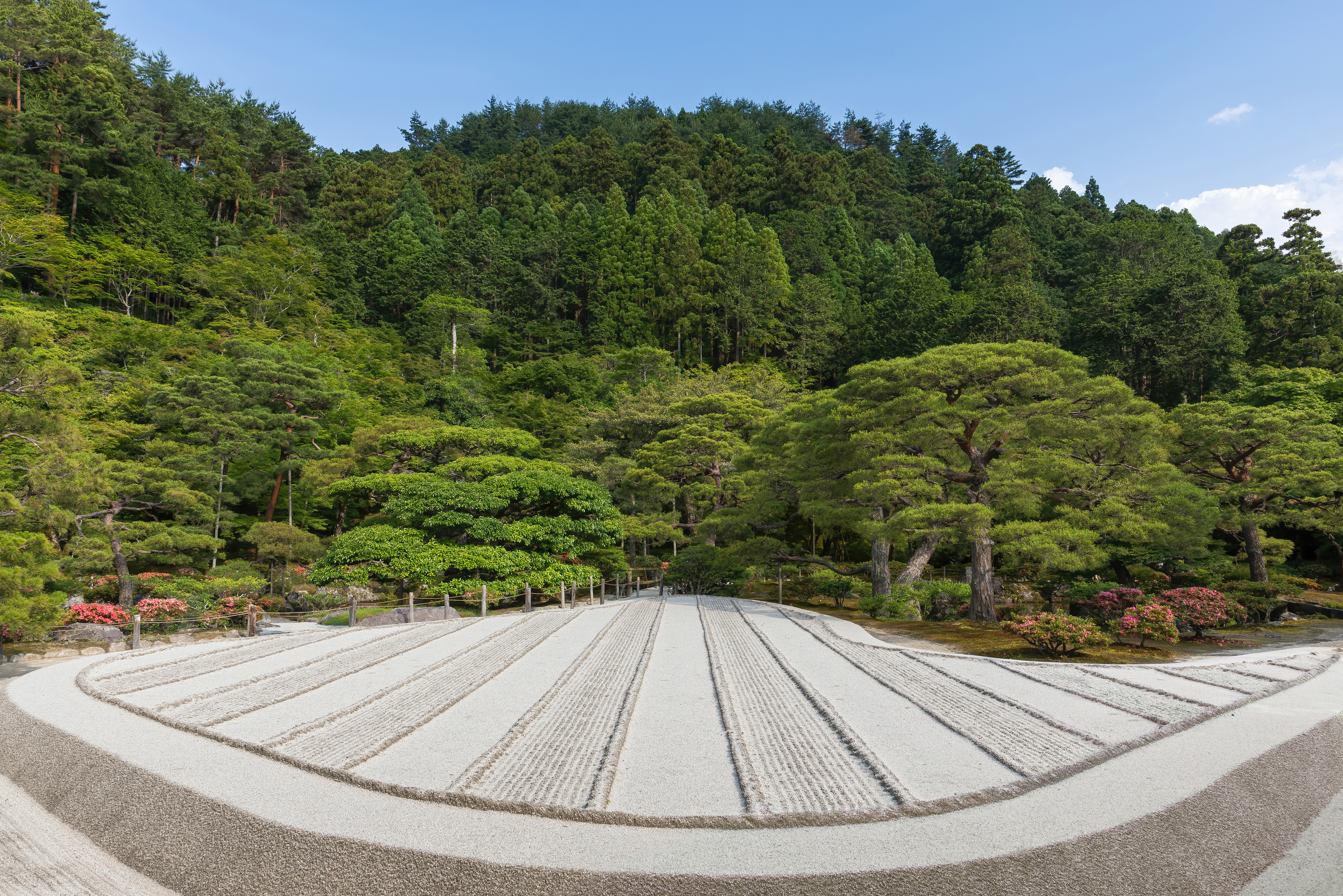
Ginshadan

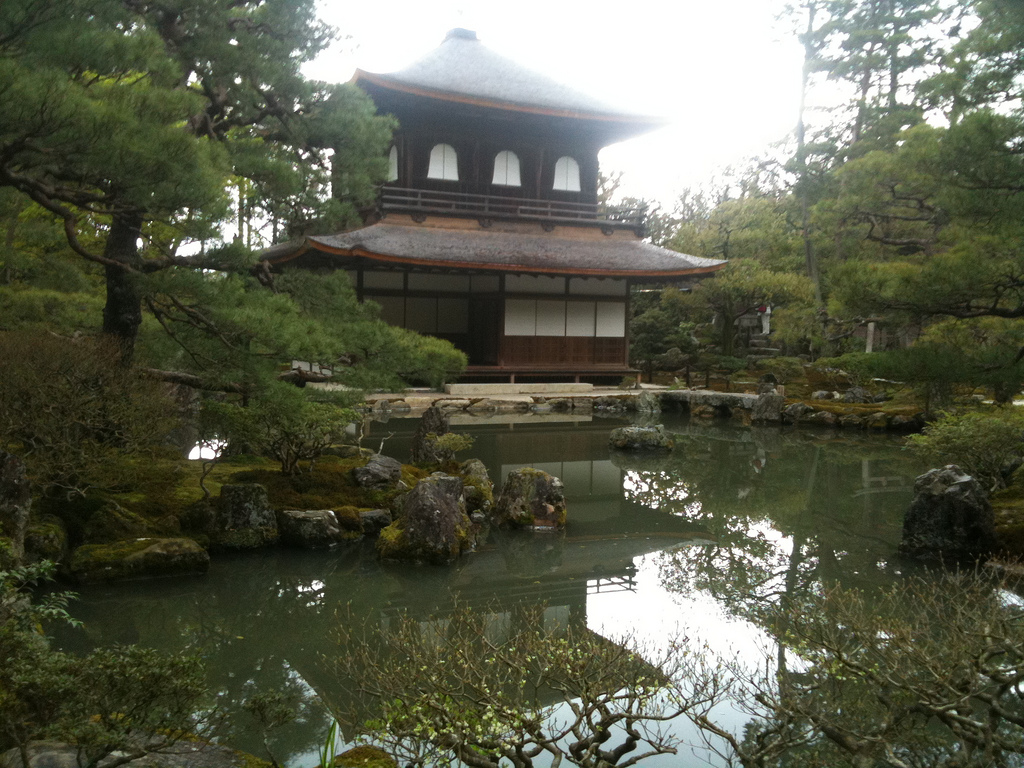
Kannon-den or "Kannon Bodhisattva Hall"

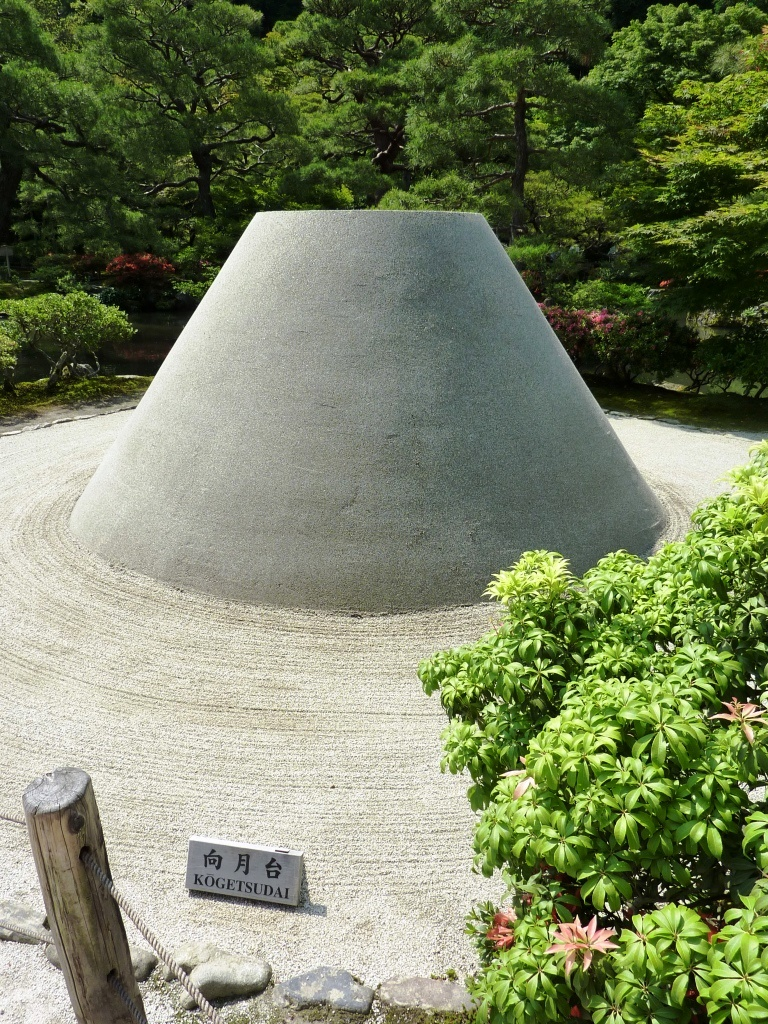
Kōgetsudai

== See also ==
- Historic Monuments of Ancient Kyoto (Kyoto, Uji and Otsu Cities)
- List of National Treasures of Japan (residences)
- List of Special Places of Scenic Beauty, Special Historic Sites and Special Natural Monuments
- Tourism in Japan
