= Mishima ware =

Japanese pottery style

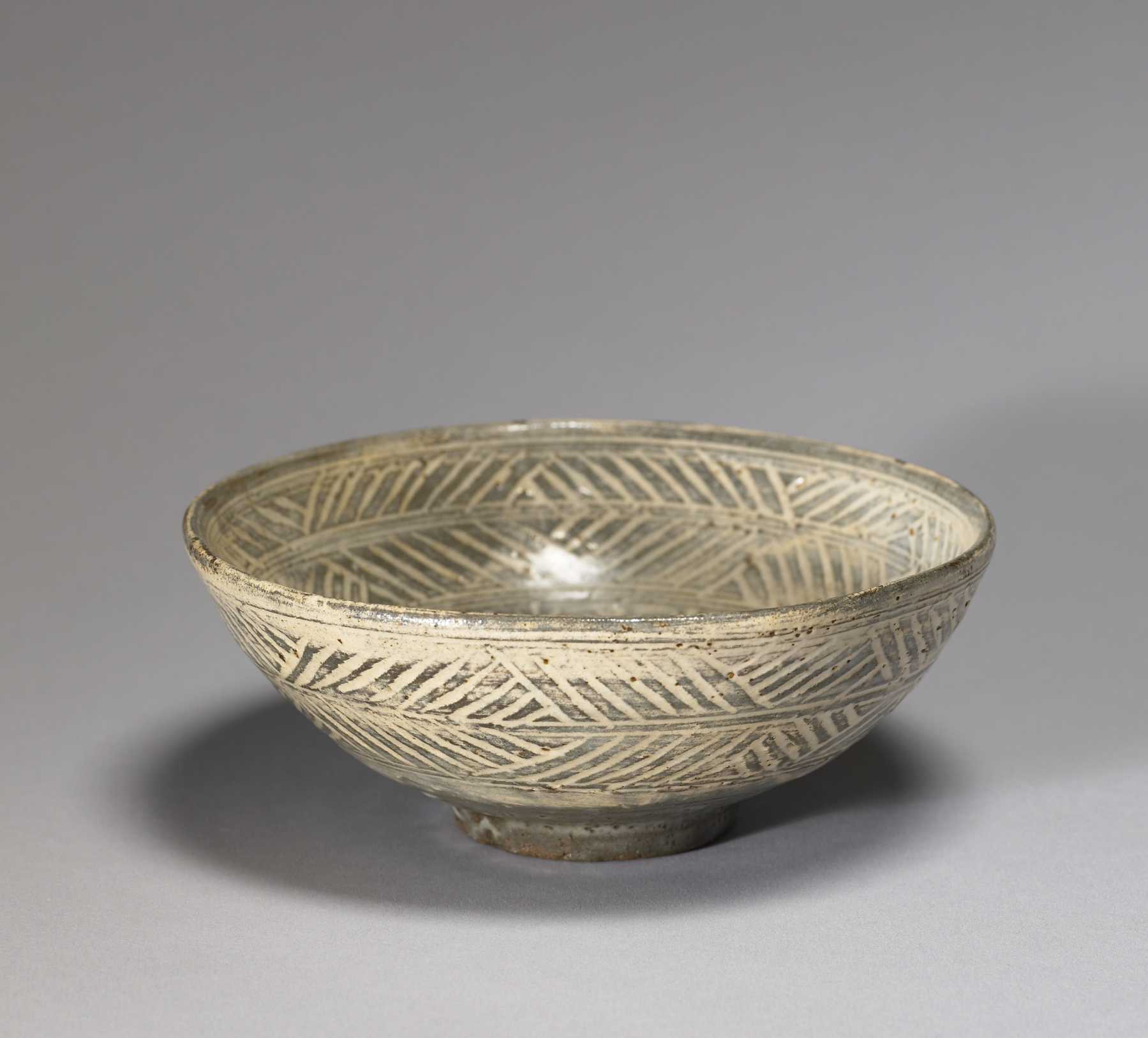
Hori-Mishima stoneware tea bowl with inlaid slip under glaze, Joseon dynasty, c. 1580 – c. 1610. Made to order in south Gyeongsang Province for the Japanese market.

Mishima ware (三島焼) refers to different types of imported and adopted Japanese pottery. Mishima originally refers to the shimamono pottery imported from the islands of Taiwan, Luzon, and "Amakawa" (Macau). They were characterized by being roughly-made and often uneven, thus epitomizing the Japanese aesthetic of wabi-sabi. In later centuries, it came to refer to imported ceramics (Gohon) from Korea with the slip inlay style. This style was imitated and produced locally in Japan.

== Shimamono Mishima ==
As described in the Tōkikō, Mishima (literally "three islands") originally referred to shimamono pottery imported from the islands of indigenous Taiwan, Luzon, and "Amakawa" (Macau). Luzon Mishima (Rusuntsubo) were usually made from purple-black clay and usually had a green glaze. Native Taiwanese Mishima (Hagi Mishima) were made from light-colored clay and were decorated with a row of round knobs and had black marks on the bottom. Amakawa Mishima are made from white clay with a gray-colored glaze.

== Korean Mishima ==
In the 17th century, it was applied to the imported Korean slip inlay style pottery from Buncheong (then known specifically as Gohon), made at the instigation of the shōgun Tokugawa Iemitsu. The style of which goes back to Goryeo (935-1392) when bowls decorated in this way were known as Korai-jawan or Korai tea bowls.

It was later imitated by kilns in Yamashiro Province. The copies were often imperfect, which is probably why they were later classified along with the traditional Mishima ware.

In Gohon Mishima ware, bowls were inlaid with various motifs such as floral and animal depictions. To create these motifs, a potter would begin by engraving the design in the body. Next, the engravings would be filled with contrasting colored clay (or slip). Finally, the bowl is then covered it with a transparent glaze. This technique peaked in Korea during the 12th and 13th-century Goryeo celadons, deemed "first under heaven." It is also referred to as zogan.

Another technique with a somewhat similar style is called Sgraffito. With this technique, the potter scratches through a coating of slip to reveal the underlying clay.

== See also ==
- Onta ware, which also uses the slip technique
