= Sōami =

Japanese artist (1455–1525)

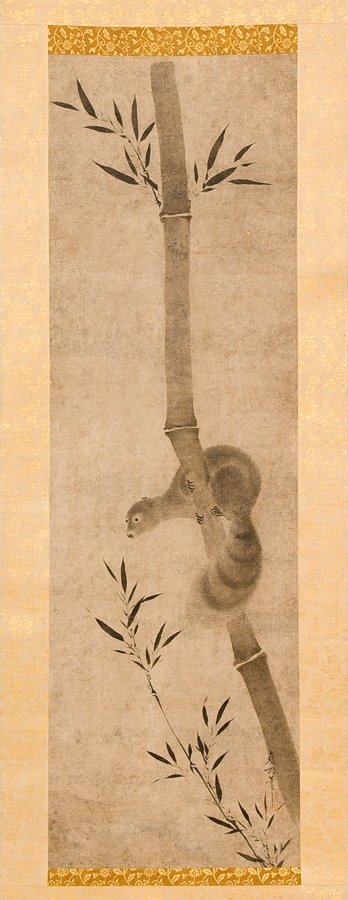

Sōami (相阿弥; died 1525) was a Japanese painter and landscape artist.

== Family ==
Sōami was the grandson and son of the painters and art connoisseurs Nōami and Geiami, respectively.

== Career ==
Sōami was in the service of the Ashikaga shogunate and is claimed to have designed the rock garden of the Ginkaku-ji temple.

Unlike many of his contemporaries, Sōami's paintings were in the style of China's Southern School; some of his greatest pieces covered over twenty panels, and depicted Japanese landscapes using Chinese methods. His work was among the first nanga or Southern School work in Japan. Sōami is most known for his Landscape of the Four Seasons (Eight Views of the Xiao and Xiang Rivers) (at Archive.org).

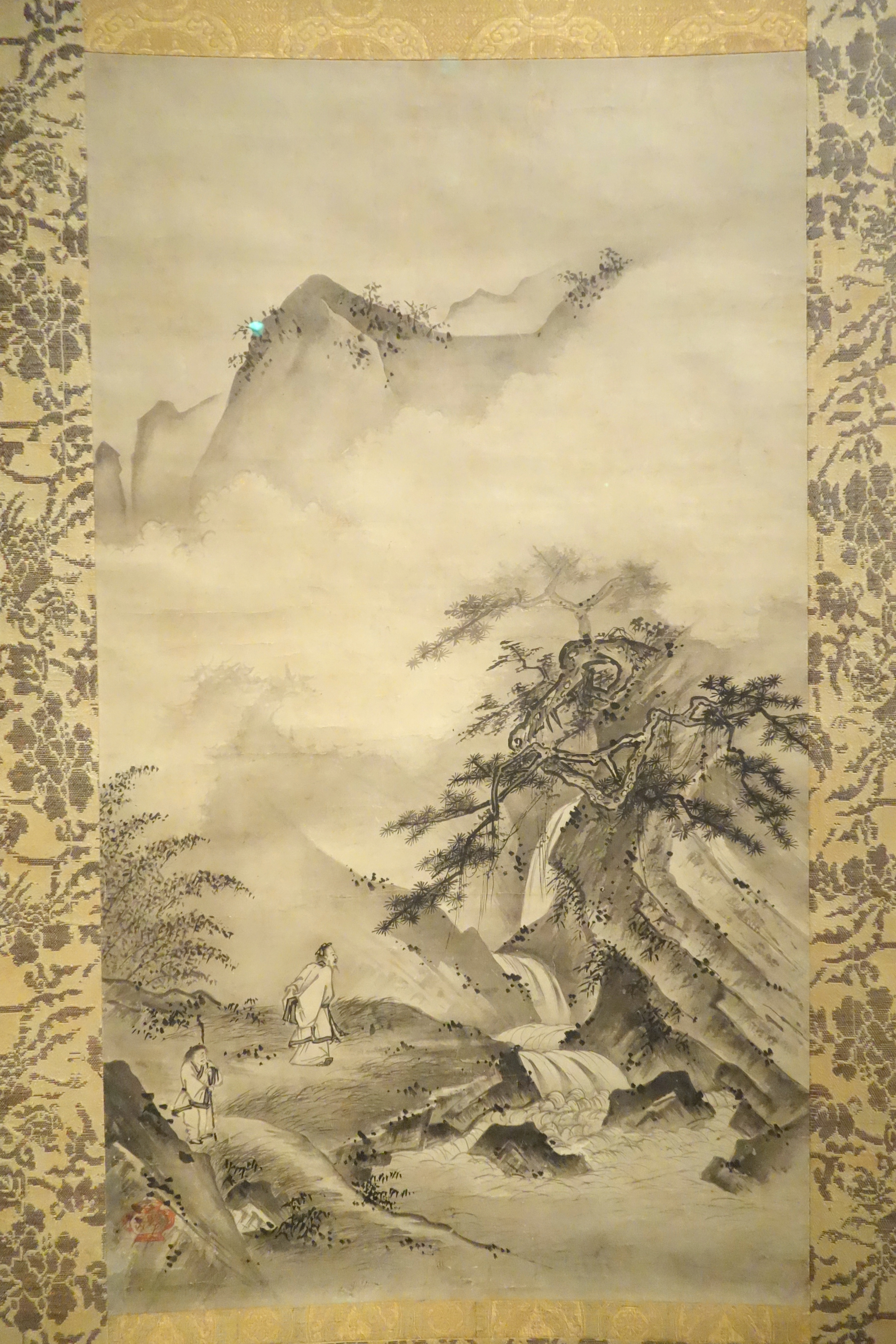
Li Bai viewing the waterfall at Mt. Lu, by Soami (d. 1525), Japan, Muromachi period, approx. 1500–1525, hanging scroll, ink on paper - Asian Art Museum of San Francisco

== Famous works ==
- Ryōan-ji: Zen temple whose rock garden may have been designed by Soami
- Seika: A style of flower arrangement supported by Soami
- Daisen-in: A Zen temple noted in part for screen paintings attributed to Soami
