= Tōkikō =

The Tōkikō (陶器考: Investigations of Pottery) is a treatise that describes the Japanese shimamono pottery trade with southeast Asia and India and gives detailed descriptions.

It was written in 1854 by Tanaka Yonisaburo (田内米三郎) and published in 1883 in Tokyo. Fay-Cooper Cole in his work "Chinese Pottery in the Philippines" from 1912 gives an English translation of two chapters which describe pottery of Luzon (Rusun) and Nanban trade.
