= Kanō Masanobu =

Japanese painter (1434–1530)

- 狩野 正信
- Born: c. 1434
- Died: c. August 2, 1530 (aged 95–96)
- Occupation: Painter
- Known for: Founder of the Kanō school
- Relatives: Kanō Muneshige (ancestor)

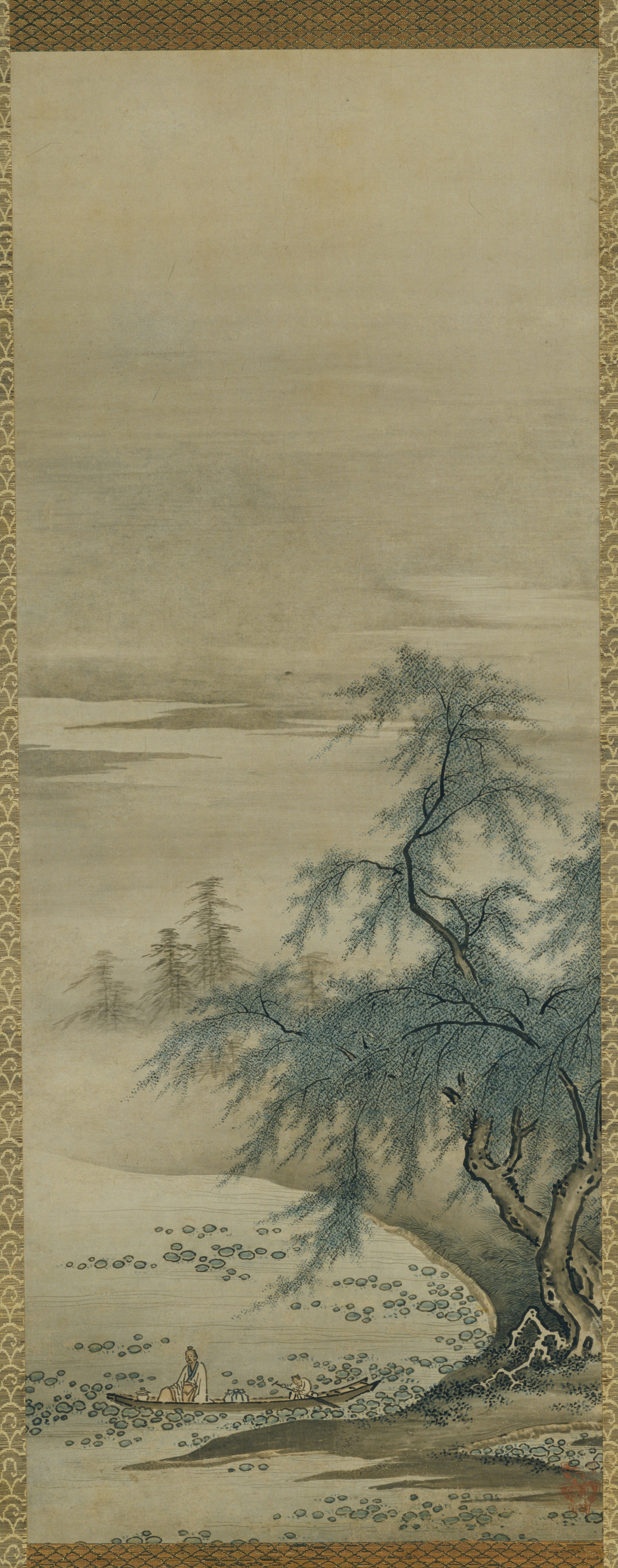
Zhou Maoshu Appreciating Lotuses, a hanging scroll by Kanō Masanobu

Kanō Masanobu (狩野 正信; 1434? – August 2, 1530?, Kyoto) was a Japanese painter. He was the chief painter of the Ashikaga shogunate and is generally considered the founder of the Kanō school of painting. Kano Masanobu specialized in Zen paintings as well as elaborate paintings of Buddhist deities and Bodhisattvas.

== Life and work ==
Masanobu's father had been a samurai and amateur artist named Kanō Kagenobu. Masanobu would start the line of professional artists of the Kanō family. As an artist, Masanobu, like many in his day, was influenced by the priest-painter Tenshō Shūbun, and some sources indicate that he may have received the bulk of his artistic education under Shūbun. Masanobu worked in the suiboku ink and wash style, derived from Chinese painting, but brought a Japanese touch to the style with more defined forms. Very few of his works survive with Zhou Maoshu Appreciating Lotuses being an exception.

Kanō Masanobu would serve the Ashikaga shogunate as an official painter (御用絵師, goyō eshi), succeeding Sōtan to the post. Although Masanobu's father was a samurai, the family was provincial and therefore he did not hold a court rank. Instead of a rank, he had gained his position in service due to a mix of both achievement and social capital. This led to some criticism as aristocrat Shūzan Tōki expressed disdain towards Masanobu stating he was not a "born court painter."

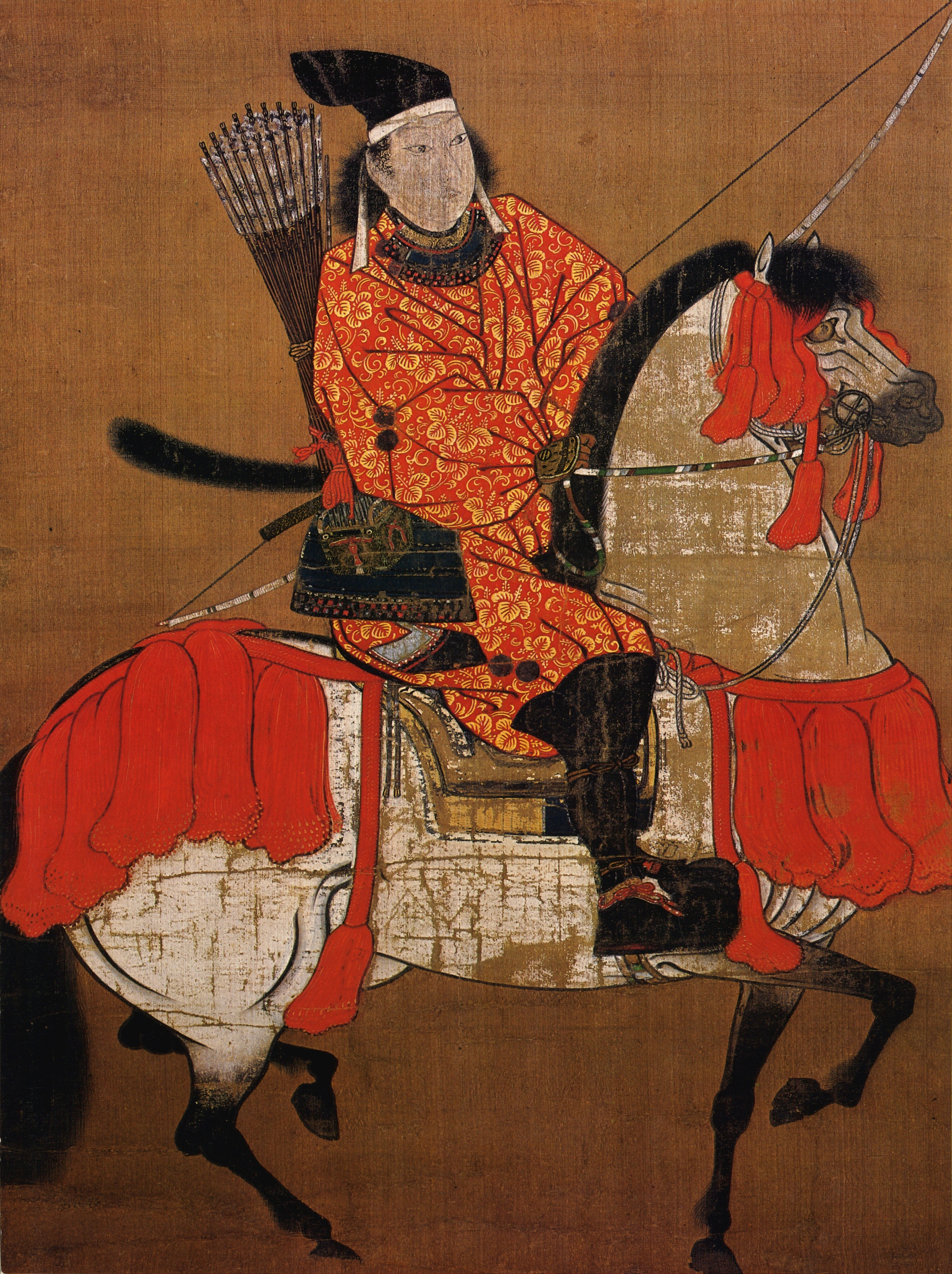
Shogun Ashikaga Yoshihisa

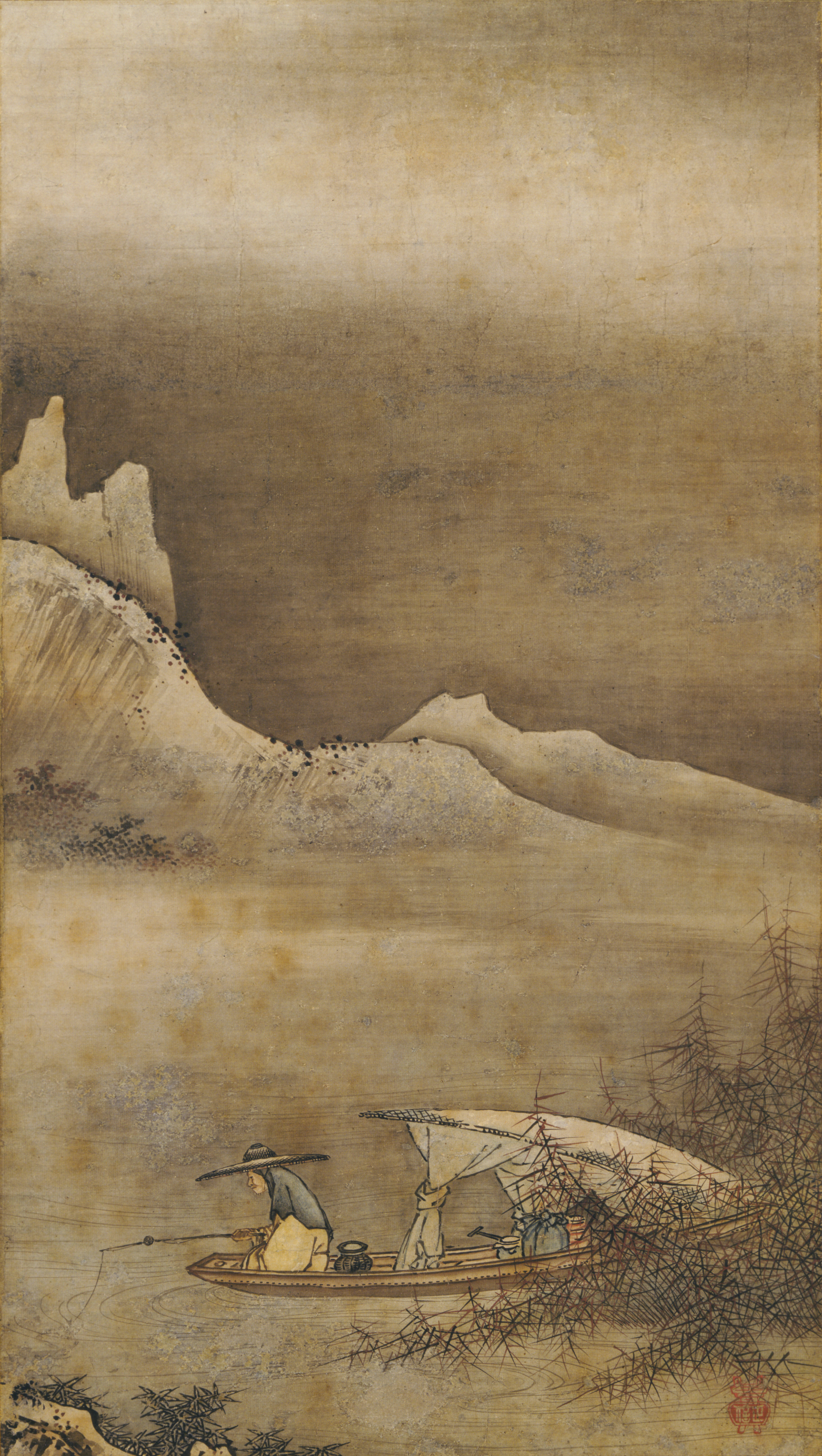
Landscape, Kyushu National Museum

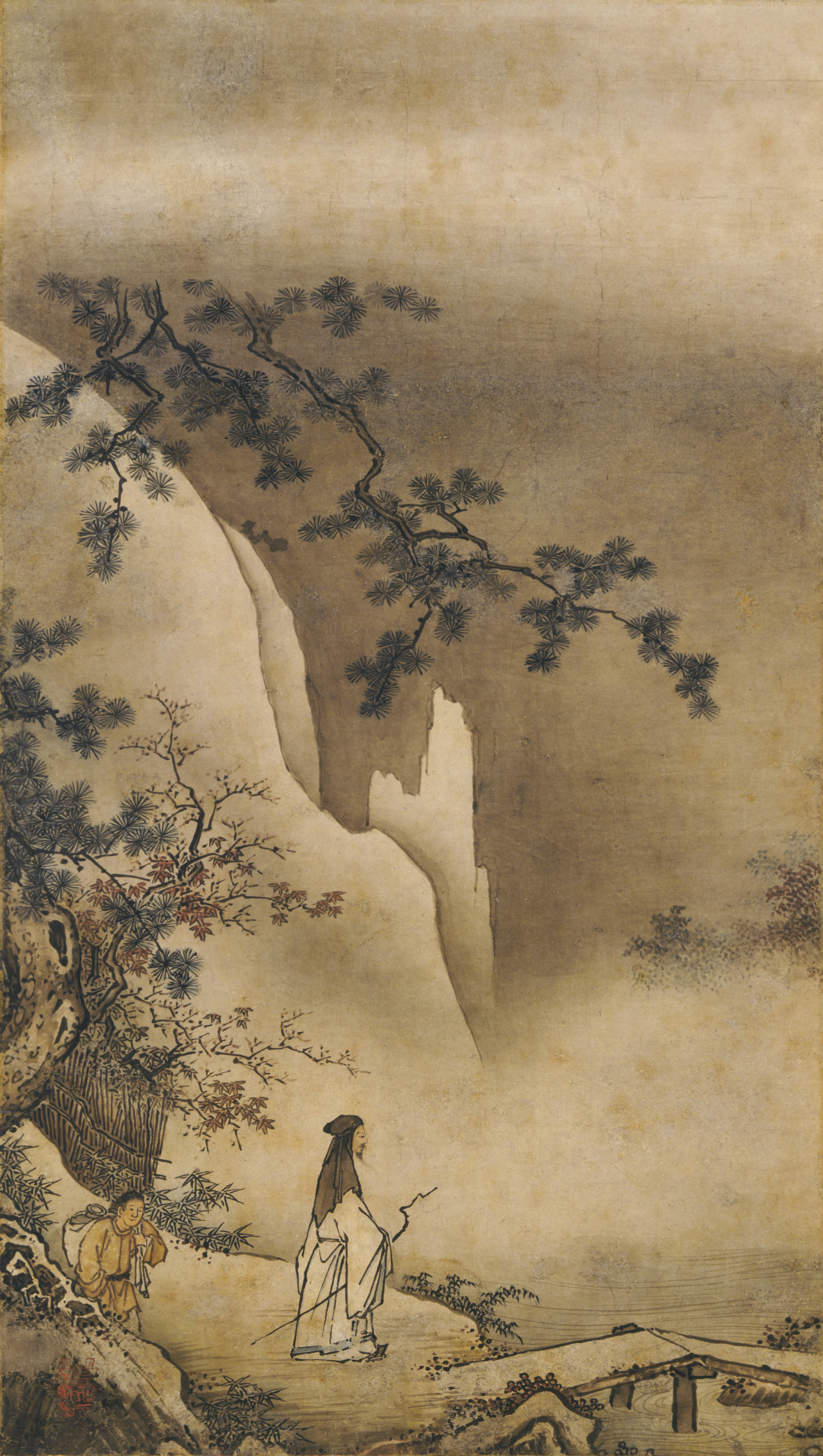
Landscape, Kyushu National Museum

== Legacy ==
The Kanō school would maintain its dominance as the dominant painting style for over 400 years from Masanobu's time up through the Meiji Restoration (1868). However, the school's style is neither purely nor mainly Masanobu's legacy, as the distinct Kanō style is linked more to Masanobu's son Kanō Motonobu, who took over as head of the school after Masanobu.

== Genealogy ==
Masanobu is said to be a descendant of Kanō Muneshige, a samurai of the Kamakura period of the Kanō clan, through his father, Kanō Kagenobu. Through this lineage, Masanobu would descend from the Fujiwara clan through the Kudō clan.

== See also ==
- Higashiyama Bunka in the Muromachi period
