= Konchi-in =

Buddhist temple in Kyoto, Japan

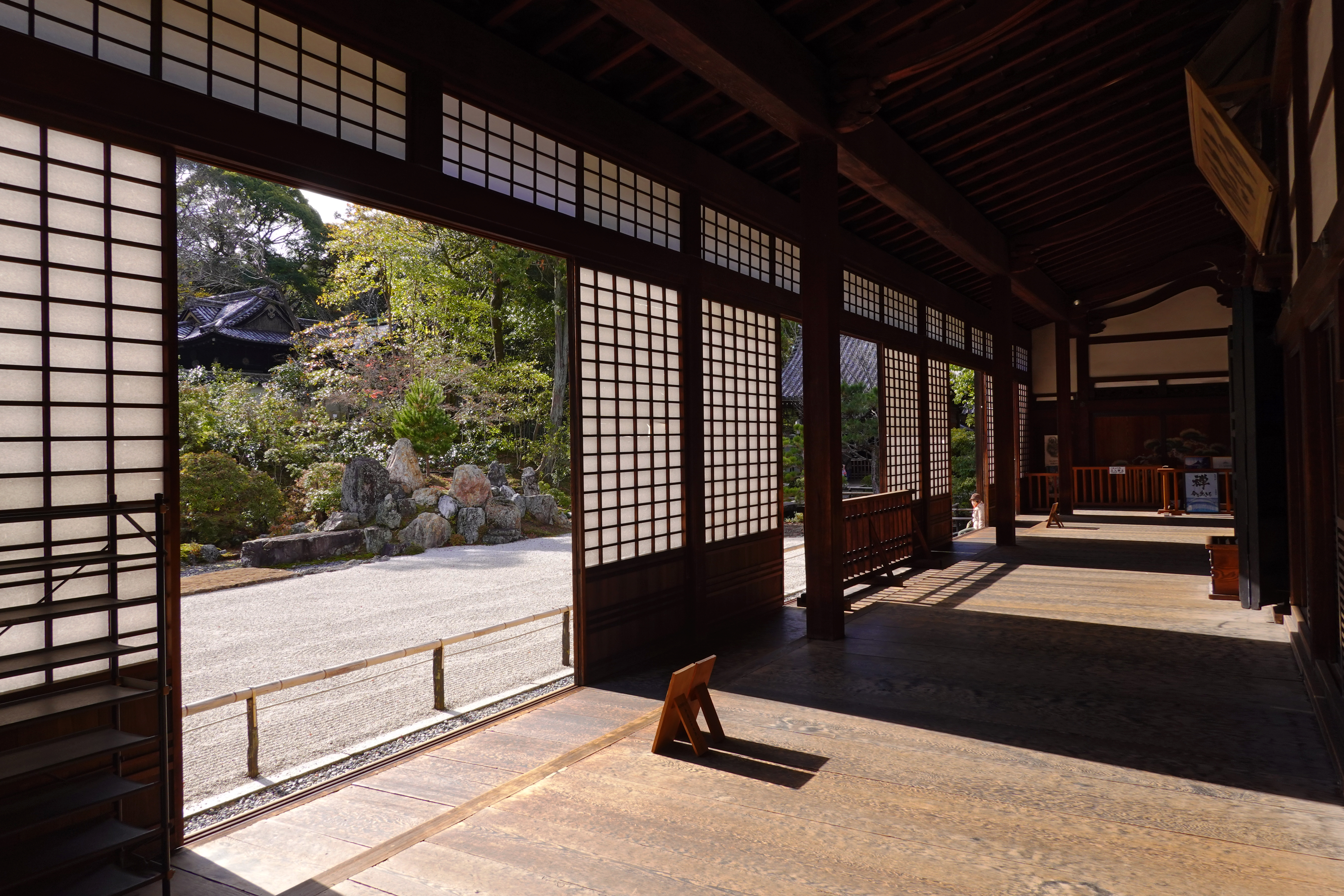
Crane and Turtle Garden of the Konchi-in

Konchi-in (金地院) is a Buddhist temple in Sakyō-ku, Kyoto, western Japan.

The temple is renowned for its Crane and Turtle Garden.
