= Gosho =

Gosho might refer to:

== People ==
- Gosho clan, Japanese family
- Gosho Aoyama, Japanese manga artist
- Heinosuke Gosho, Japanese film director
- Gosho no Gorōmaru, Japanese samurai
- Gosho Ginchev, Bulgarian footballer
- Gosho Motoharu, Japanese martial artist

== Places ==
- Kyoto Gosho (Kyoto Imperial Palace), former ruling palace of the Emperor of Japan
- Akasaka Gosho (Akasaka Palace), current residence of the Emperor of Japan
- Fukiage Gosho (Fukiage Palace), main residence of the Emperor of Japan
- Sentō Gosho (Sentō Imperial Palace), Emeritus Imperial Palace of Japan
- Yanagi-no-Gosho, a palace in Japan
- Horigoe Gosho, Horigoe Palace ruins archeological site
- Gōshō-ji (disambiguation), a number of Buddhist temples in Japan, including:
  - Gōshō-ji (Takarazuka)
- Gosho Park, a park in Zimbabwe
- Gosho-ha Hyōhō Niten Ichi-ryū, Japanese martial arts school
- Gosho Dam, a dam in Japan
