= Kim Ji-hoon =

Kim Ji-hoon or Kim Ji-hun (Korean: 김지훈) is a Korean name consisting of the family name Kim and the given name Ji-hoon, and may refer to:

- Kim Ji-hoon (director) (born 1971), South Korean film director
- Kim Ji-hoon (singer) (1973–2013), South Korean singer
- Kim Ji-hoon (actor, born 1981), South Korean actor
- Kim Ji-hoon (gymnast) (born 1984), South Korean gymnast
- Kim Ji-hoon (sailor) (born 1985), South Korean sailor
- Kim Ji-hoon (boxer) (born 1987), South Korean boxer
- Kim Ji-hun (wrestler) (born 1992), South Korean Greco-Roman wrestler
- Kim Ji-hoon (actor, born 2000), South Korean actor and singer, member of TRCNG
- Jihoon Kim, South Korean operatic bass in the United Kingdom
- Kim Ji-hoon, South Korean director of video game developer Project Moon, developers of Lobotomy Corporation, Library of Ruina, and Limbus Company
