= L Corp =

L Corp may refer to:

- LexCorp, a fictional company in the DC Universe
- Lobotomy Corporation, an indie horror management simulation video game
