= Limbus Company =

2023 turn-based strategy video game

- Developer: Project Moon
- Director: Kim Ji-hoon (game dev)
- Composers: Mili; Studio EIM
- Platforms: Microsoft Windows, iOS, Android
- Release: February 26, 2023
- Genre: Action role-playing
- Mode: Single-player

Limbus Company is an indie gacha management and action role-playing visual novel video game for Microsoft Windows and mobile devices using iOS or Android, developed and published by South Korean studio Project Moon. It was released worldwide on February 26, 2023. The game is set in the same dystopian, hyper-capitalist world known as "The City", where all of Project Moon's other works take place, including Lobotomy Corporation, Library of Ruina, and multiple webcomics such as Leviathan and The Distortion Detective, but takes place some time after the events of all those stories.

The game has gacha elements, making it possible to spend real money to acquire Lunacy (the in-game currency) or tickets used to acquire Sinner Identities or their respective Extermination of Geometrical Organ (E.G.O) outside of the base units given to the player.

== Gameplay ==
When entering a battle stage, the player is able to choose a certain amount out of 12 selectable characters, known as "Sinners", usually 5 to 7, to fight. Each Sinner can be equipped with an Identity that defines their base skills, and a set of powerful skills, known as "E.G.O". Each E.G.O skill has an assigned power level (ZAYIN, TETH, HE, WAW, and ALEPH), and a Sinner may only equip one of each. Newer stages using the Chain Battle format allow the player to substitute backup Sinners in when an on-field Sinner dies, effectively allowing the player to use all 12 Sinners.

In normal unfocused fights, the player drags a pointer across two rows of icons. Each icon represents one of a Sinner's skills, with Sinners gaining additional skill slots under various circumstances. The aim is to form a chain of skills to use against enemies. In focused fights against enemies known as "Abnormalities" or bosses, players instead will be able to dictate which Sinner's attack should target which enemy, or a specific body part of the enemy. Chaining attacks of the same color, or Sin Affinity, activates Resonance, which increases the damage of the attacks included. Using skills additionally yields "Sin Resources" of that attack's Sin Affinity.

Every Skill has a minimum Base Power, a certain number of Coins, and a Coin Power that determines the effect of each Coin. Attacking Skills are also classified into different damage types: Slash, Blunt, or Pierce. Different enemies are resistant, neutral, or weak to different damage types. Finally, every skill has an Attack Weight behind it, determining how many enemies it will hit. Skills with more than 1 Attack Weight may deal a fixed amount of damage to all targets, or hit targets randomly a certain number of times, known as an Unfocused Volley.

When a Sinner and enemy Clash, both flip their 'Coins' that are placed above the name of the skill to determine their attacks' Final Power, with Sanity Points (SP) determining a character's luck in flipping heads. Heads will alter the skill's Base Power by the Coin Power (typically an increase; a decrease instead for certain Identities and E.G.Os), while tails leaves the Final Power as is. When one side has a higher Final Power, they win the clash, the loser loses one of their coins, and the coins are re-flipped. This process continues until one side loses all their coins, after which the winner launches their attack using their remaining coins.

Some characters' skills may also have Unbreakable Coins, colored in red. As per their name, Unbreakable Coins will not break even if that coin flip was lost (their coin power will not count in future flips), and allow a character to attack even if they lost the clash. Unbreakable coins that lose clashes will become "Cracked," setting their Coin Power to +1. Moreover, some unplayable units' attacks have Excision Coins, colored in green. These coins gain power when clashing against red coins and can destroy Unbreakable Coins in a clash, acting like an Unbreakable Coin when losing a clash.

At the start of each turn, each Sinner rolls a random Speed value within a defined range. A Sinner may clash with any enemy with a lower Speed than them, and can only attack enemies with equal or higher Speed than them with an Unopposed Attack. However, a Sinner may clash with any enemy that is directly targeting them, irrespective of Speed.

The player can choose to attack using a Sinner's E.G.O. skill in place of their bottom skill in the dashboard. E.G.O skills are often significantly more powerful than a sinner's normal skills; however, doing so spends the Sinner's SP and a number of collected Sin resources. The lower a Sinner's sanity is when they use an E.G.O. skill, the higher chance they have to launch a "corroded" E.G.O. skill, which is more powerful, but additionally targets allies and renders that Sinner uncontrollable for one turn. The player can use a corroded E.G.O. skill without this risk by "Overclocking" the E.G.O. skill, unleashing its corroded variant at the cost of additional Sin resources and SP.

The player may also choose to replace a Sinner's bottom skill with their respective defense skill, of which there are three types. Guard skills generate a shield that resists a certain amount of damage, Evade skills dodge attacks whose power are lower than or equal to the evasion's power, and Counter skills unavoidably attack an enemy after the Sinner is attacked (unless the Sinner is Staggered before activating the counter). There are also clashable variants of Counter and Guard skills, meaning they can clash with an enemy's attack and halt it entirely; Clashable Guards, which always have an unbreakable Coin, will reuse the coin to reduce damage taken no matter the result of the clash.

When a character's health falls below a certain limit (Varies between enemies and Sinners), they become Staggered, greatly increasing the damage they take and preventing them from acting next turn. Many Identities and several enemies have multiple Stagger Thresholds that allow them to be Staggered repeatedly, amplifying the effects each time.

During Canto X, the gameplay changes notably as players enter the "Grand Magasin Sisyphe"-- a virtual realm where they can freely explore and interact with their surroundings in the Symbolic, a free-roaming game mode stylized after RPGMaker horror games. Supplementing the usual combat system is the ability to purchase items from designated shopkeepers, upgrading their combat abilities in both the Symbolic (a new combat system) and Shadowed (the combat system usually employed by the game).

=== Gacha system ===
Identities and E.G.O. can be obtained using the game's gacha system, called "Extraction". Extractions can be performed using "Lunacy", a currency obtained from clearing stages, clearing the weekly "Mirror Dungeon" game mode, or from in-app purchases. Alternatively "Extraction Tickets" can be used, which can be obtained from the battle pass and various events. Some Extraction Tickets allow for 10 Extractions at once, known as Decaextraction Tickets, and others guarantee Identities of certain rarities or released in certain seasons. "Egoshards" for the different Sinners can be spent at the "Dispenser" to purchase identities and E.G.O. skills directly, alternatively, Limbus Company offers an option called “Paid Lunacy" in which you can use to buy E.G.O. from the in-game shop. “Egoshards” are obtained from Egoshard Crates or from performing Extractions. Egoshards can be obtained through Extractions, or through by opening Egoshard Crates obtained from events and the battle pass. Most Identities and E.G.O. are permanently available; however some are only obtainable during Walpurgisnacht events that occur every few months, while Identities and E.G.O from the previous season cannot be obtained using Egoshards until the next season.

== Setting ==
Following the previous installments in the series, Lobotomy Corporation and Library of Ruina, Limbus Company takes place in a dystopian city-state simply known as "the City". The City comprises twenty-six districts, each unique in technological advancements and culture. Each district is locally governed by a Wing, a megacorporation named after a letter of the alphabet that operates using a unique technology known as a Singularity. The Wings are led by the Head, a conglomerate consisting of A Corp, B Corp, and C Corp, that also enforces universal taboos of the city. Each District is physically split into a Nest, the urban residence supported by the Corps, and the Backstreets, poverty-stricken areas overrun by criminal Syndicates and outside of the Corps' protection.

Many people in the City work as Fixers, contractors who take jobs relating to various fields of expertise. Each Fixer is assigned a numerical grade based on their skill and experience, with 9 being the lowest and 1 being the highest. Fixers that perform impressive feats, or surpass Grade 1 Fixers in certain aspects, will be promoted to the rank of Color Fixer and granted a unique title based on a color and concept they are associated with. Fixers may work together in small Offices or Associations, or work on their own. The Hana Association, one of the largest associations in the city, is responsible for assigning licenses and fixer grades.

Occasionally, humans overcome with intense emotion will hear the voice of a woman named Carmen. People who listen to and obey her words will transform into monstrous entities called Distortions. Inversely, those who fully refuse her offer may manifest "Effloresced" E.G.O equipment in the form of armor, tools and/or weaponry that greatly empower their combat capabilities and provide supernatural abilities. Collectively referred to as the Distortion phenomenon, the concept holds great significance to the game's plot and the plot of Library of Ruina.

The player takes the role of Dante, an amnesiac with a clock-shaped prosthetic head. Just before they are about to be executed, Dante is rescued by the Limbus Company Bus Department, who inform them of their new role as the manager of the team and their quest to find the Golden Boughs, rare and powerful artifacts that spawned across the city after the fall of Lobotomy Corporation, which are believed to be remnants of L Corp's technology. The game is split into chapters, named "Cantos", which are all character-driven and delve into the Sinners' past and trauma on their journey. There are also "Intervallos" in between Cantos, serving as secondary stories that may provide context for the following Canto.

=== Characters ===
The main party of Limbus Company is composed of 13 "Sinners", brought together under a contract with the titular Limbus Company. Dante is considered one of these Sinners, though they do not actively participate in combat. Joining them are Vergilius and Charon, who serve as the team's guide and bus driver respectively.

| Sinner # | Name | Voice actor | Literary reference |
|---|---|---|---|
| 1 | Yi Sang | Min Seung-woo | Kim Hae-gyeong (Yi Sang), Korean writer and poet, and his short novel The Wings. |
| 2 | Faust | Park Ji-yoon | Faust, titular protagonist of the play written by Johann Wolfgang von Goethe |
| 3 | Don Quixote | Kim Yea-lim | Don Quixote, titular protagonist of Don Quixote written by Miguel de Cervantes (Note: The character's true name is later revealed to be Sancho, who has taken up the alias Don Quixote in the place of the real one unknowingly.) (Note: Notably also heavily references the musical Man of La Mancha in both her weapon and in-game quotes.) |
| 4 | Ryōshū (Note: "Ryōshū" is the original reading of the protagonist's name 良秀 as seen in Uji Shūi Monogatari, which Hell Screen is a reworking of.) | Yi Sae-ah | Yoshihide, the protagonist of the short story Hell Screen by Ryūnosuke Akutagawa (Note: The character's true name is later revealed to be Yoshihide, who has taken up the alias Ryōshū after her daughter Araya misread her name as "Ryōshū".) |
| 5 | Meursault | Kwon Sung-hyuk | Meursault, main character of the novella The Stranger by Albert Camus |
| 6 | Hong Lu | Kim Sin-woo | Jia Baoyu, main character of the novel Dream of the Red Chamber by Cao Xueqin (Note: The character's true name is later revealed to be Jia Baoyu, who has taken up the alias Hong Lu in order to not tarnish the value of his true name.) |
| 7 | Heathcliff | Hong Seung-hyo | Heathcliff, main character of the novel Wuthering Heights by Emily Brontë |
| 8 | Ishmael | Jang Ye-na | Ishmael, narrator and main character of the novel Moby-Dick by Herman Melville |
| 9 | Rodion | Yoon A-young | Rodion Raskolnikov, main character of the novel Crime and Punishment by Fyodor Dostoevsky |
| 10 | Dante | N/A (Note: Dante's voicelines comprise entirely of clock ticking.) | Dante Alighieri and his narrative poem The Divine Comedy |
| 11 | Sinclair | Kim Da-ol | Emil Sinclair, main character of the bildungsroman Demian by Hermann Hesse |
| 12 | Outis (Note: "Outis" is an alias translating to "Nobody" that Odysseus uses to refer to himself to Polyphemus briefly in the Odyssey.) | Kim Bo-na | Odysseus, the protagonist of the epic poem Odyssey by Homer |
| 13 | Gregor | Choi Han | Gregor Samsa, main character of the novel The Metamorphosis by Franz Kafka |

== Music ==
The game's original soundtrack is generally composed by Studio EIM, with the main theme, "In Hell We Live, Lament", being sung by the Japanese indie music group Mili and featuring vocalist KIHOW from the Japanese pop rock band Myth & Roid. Prior to Limbus Company, Mili had worked with Project Moon on their previous game Library of Ruina. Over the course of Limbus Company's updates, Mili began to compose the themes for the final boss fights in Cantos, including "Between Two Worlds", "Fly My Wings", "Compass", "Through Patches of Violet", "Hero", "TIAN TIAN", "SAIKAI", and "Rendezvous".

At the end of every Canto, each of the Sinners perform their own rendition of the song "Pass On" ("Sarajinae 사라지네").

== Reception ==
According to its website, it reached 180,000 total pre-registrations before releasing.
