= Tobe, Yokohama =

Tobe 戸部町
- District
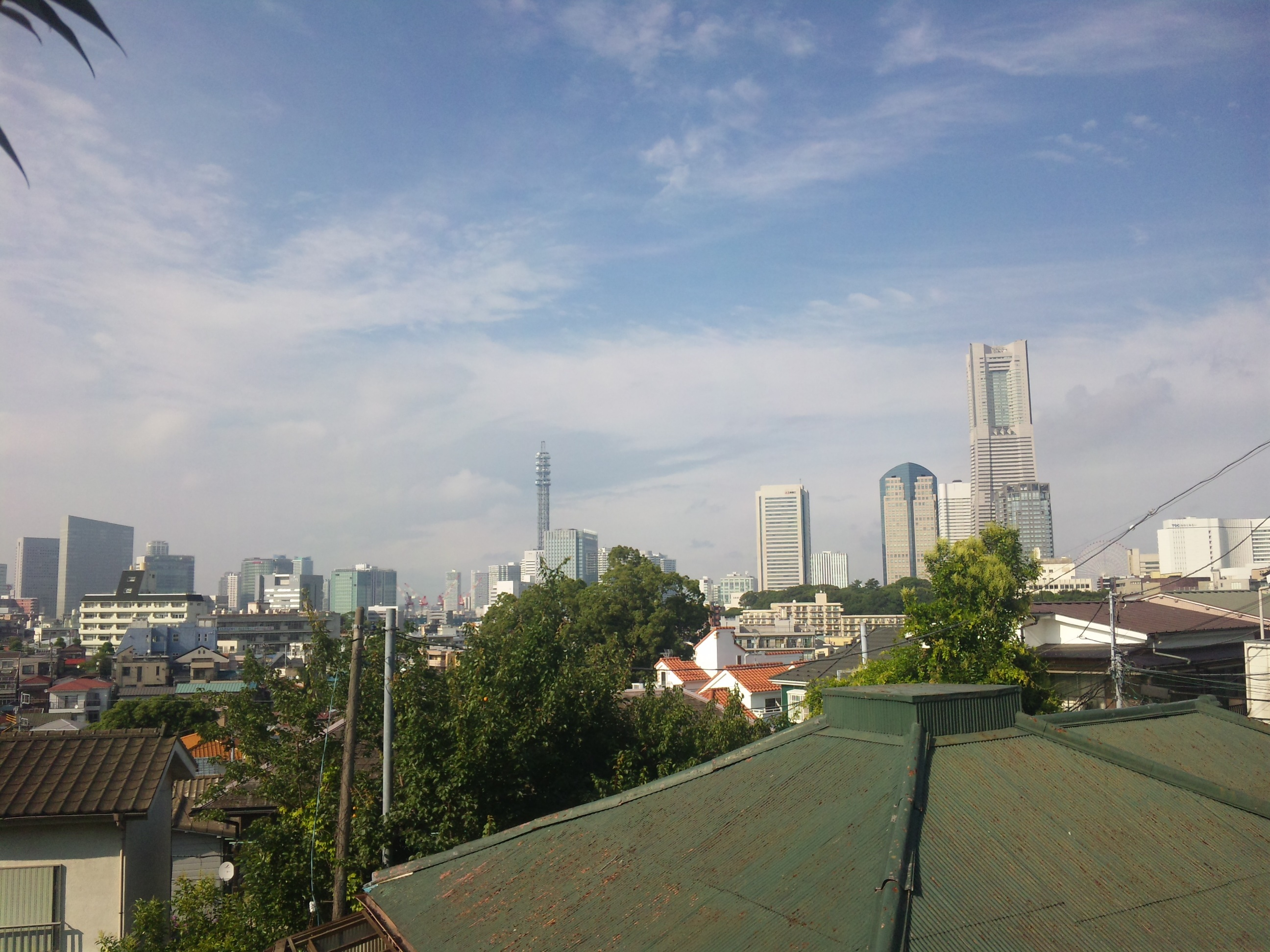
- View of Minato Mirai from Tobe

- Location within Japan
- Coordinates: 35°27′12.24″N 139°37′26.55″E
- Country: Japan
- Region: Kantō
- Prefecture: Yokohama
- Ward: Nishi-ku
- Town: 1859
- Yokohama City: 1889

Area
  - Total: 14 ha (35 acres)

Population (2021)
  - Total: 4,046
  - Density: 30,000/km^{2} (78,000/sq mi)
- Time zone: UTC+9 (Japan Standard Time)

Tobe (戸部町, Tobe-chō) is a district in Yokohama, Kanagawa Prefecture, Japan. It was formerly a town chartered in 1859 as a governmental center for the Port of Yokohama, though only a portion of it remains as present-day Tobe. The current district consists of seven sub-districts, Tobe-chō 1-chōme to 7-chōme, and does not implement the Japanese district-block-lot addressing system. As of 2021, it had a population of 4,046.

== History ==
The name Tobe is said to derive from Tobe Minbu who lived in the old town area.

Located in Kuraki District, Musashi Province, it was called Tobe-gō in the Sengoku period. In the Edo period it was called Tobe-mura, and was territory under the direct control of the Tokugawa shogunate. During Bunsei era, Nogeura was established as Noge village (present-day Noge-chō) inside Tobe.

In 1859, when the Port of Yokohama was opened, Yokohama Road was built in Tobe, and government offices such as the Kanagawa Governor's Office, government houses, and a prison (present-day Yokohama Prison) were concentrated in Tobe to control the port. Machiya were also formed and Tobe was established as a town, changing its name to Tobe-chō.

As the urban area of Yokohama expanded, a number of new towns were established which separated from Tobe - Miyazaki-chō was established in 1870, Ise-chō in 1872, and Oimatsu-chō and Tsukioka-chō in 1876. In addition, the coastal area was reclaimed for the construction of a railroad (later known as the Tōkaidō Main Line), and Sakuragi-chō and other towns were established. In 1878, the District, Town, and Village Arrangement Act made the areas along Yokohama Road in Tobe, which had already been urbanized, part of Yokohama Ward. In 1889, Yokohama City was established as a municipality. The town was renamed Tobe-chō, Yokohama City on April 1, 1889, when the city was incorporated.

The remaining area of Tobe was again renamed Tobe-chō, Kuraki District under the District and Township Arrangement Act, and became Ōaza-Tobe in Toda village, Kuraki District when the municipal system was enforced in 1889. Toda village became Toda-chō when the town system was enacted in 1895, and was incorporated into Yokohama City in 1901. At the time, the name of the former Ōaza-Tobe in Toda-chō was changed to Nishi-Tobe-chō, as there was already a Tobe-chō in the city. As new towns were established and separated due to several revisions of municipal districts and the implementation of residential indication after the incorporation of Yokohama City, only a small portion of the original Nishi-Tobe remains as the present-day Nishi-Tobe.

== Former area ==
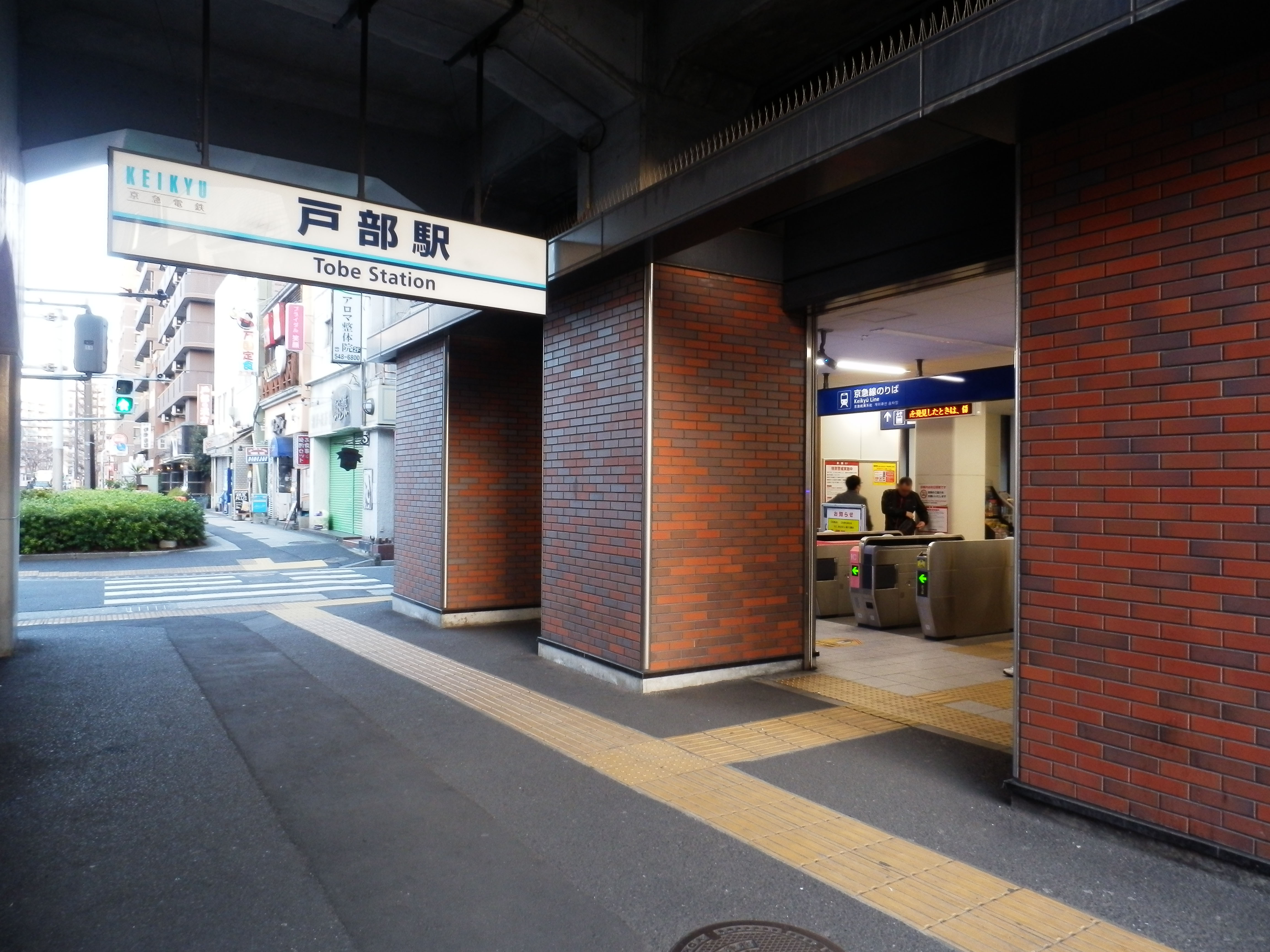
Tobe Station

The former Tobe town area consists of the following present-day districts. The area had a population of about 40,000 as of 2021.

=== Tobe-chō ===
In 1878, when the District, Town and Village Arrangement Act was enacted, this area became part of Yokohama Ward together with Miyazaki, Ise and Oimatsu (all separated from Tobe) because they had already been urbanized. It is a long and narrow district along the Yokohama Road (present-day Tobe-dōri), which has become a historic shopping district.

=== Tobehon-chō ===
Formed in 1966 through the merger of Kōbai-chō, Ishizaki-chō, Tenjin-chō, and part of Tobe-chō. National Route 1 runs through the area, and Tobe Station and Tobe Police Station are located here.

=== Nishi-Tobe-chō ===
Toda-chō was incorporated into Yokohama City, and Ōaza-Tobe became Nishi-Tobe-chō. In 1928, the districts of Nishimae, Fujidana, Hamamatsu, Goshoyama, Sakainotani, Sugiyama, Ogida, Tenjin, Kōbai, and Ishizaki were established. Northwest of Nogeyama remains as present-day Nishi-Tobe-chō.

=== Ise-chō ===
Established in 1872, it was named after the Iseyama Kōtai Shrine. The Negishi Line runs through the area, close to the Ise-chō shopping district.

=== Goshoyama-chō ===
The name derives from Gosho no Gorōmaru who is said to have lived there.

=== Momijigaoka ===
Established in 1928 from parts of Ise-chō and Tobe-chō, it is a hilly area on Momiji-zaka, and is an educational area with the Kanagawa Prefectural Library, Kanagawa Prefectural Music Hall, and Yokohama Noh Theater in Kamonyama Park, the former site of the Kanagawa Governor's Office.

=== Chūō ===
Established in 1966 through the merger of Sugiyama-chō, Ogida-chō, and part of Nishimae-chō, it is the center of Nishi Ward, where administrative buildings such as the Nishi Ward Office are concentrated. Sugiyama Shrine, the shrine of the former Tobe, is located here.

=== Oimatsu-chō ===
Established in 1876, it was named after the many old pine trees of the area. In 1935, it absorbed Tsukioka, which was established in the same year. Nogeyama Zoo, and the Yokohama Central Library are located there.

=== Miyazaki-chō ===
Established in 1870, it was named after Miyagasaki, the old name of the area, and the Iseyama Kōtai Shrine. In addition to the shrine, there are many religious facilities in the area, including Narita-san Yokohama Betsuin Enmei-in Temple, Mantoku-ji Temple, and Momiji-zaka Church of the United Church of Christ in Japan.

=== Nishimae-chō ===
The Nishimae shopping district along Hodogaya Street was separated as a center and is currently the smallest district in the ward.

=== Fujidana-chō ===
The name derives from a wagashi-shop in front of the Yokohama streetcar stop, and was adopted as the name of the district at the request of the residents.

=== Hamamatsu-chō ===
It was named after a pine tree when the area was a salt field. There is the Hamamatsu-chō intersection, the junction of National Route 1 and Route 16.

=== Sakainotani ===
In 1913, when the Yokohama City Tramway was opened, the Sakainotani cut was cut through the valley, and currently Fujidana Urafune-dōri runs through it.

== Geography ==
The former town area is located in the south of Nishi Ward, bordered by diluvial uplands of Nogeyama to the south and west, Hiranuma across the Ishizaki River to the north, and Sakuragi and Minato Mirai to the east.

== Services ==
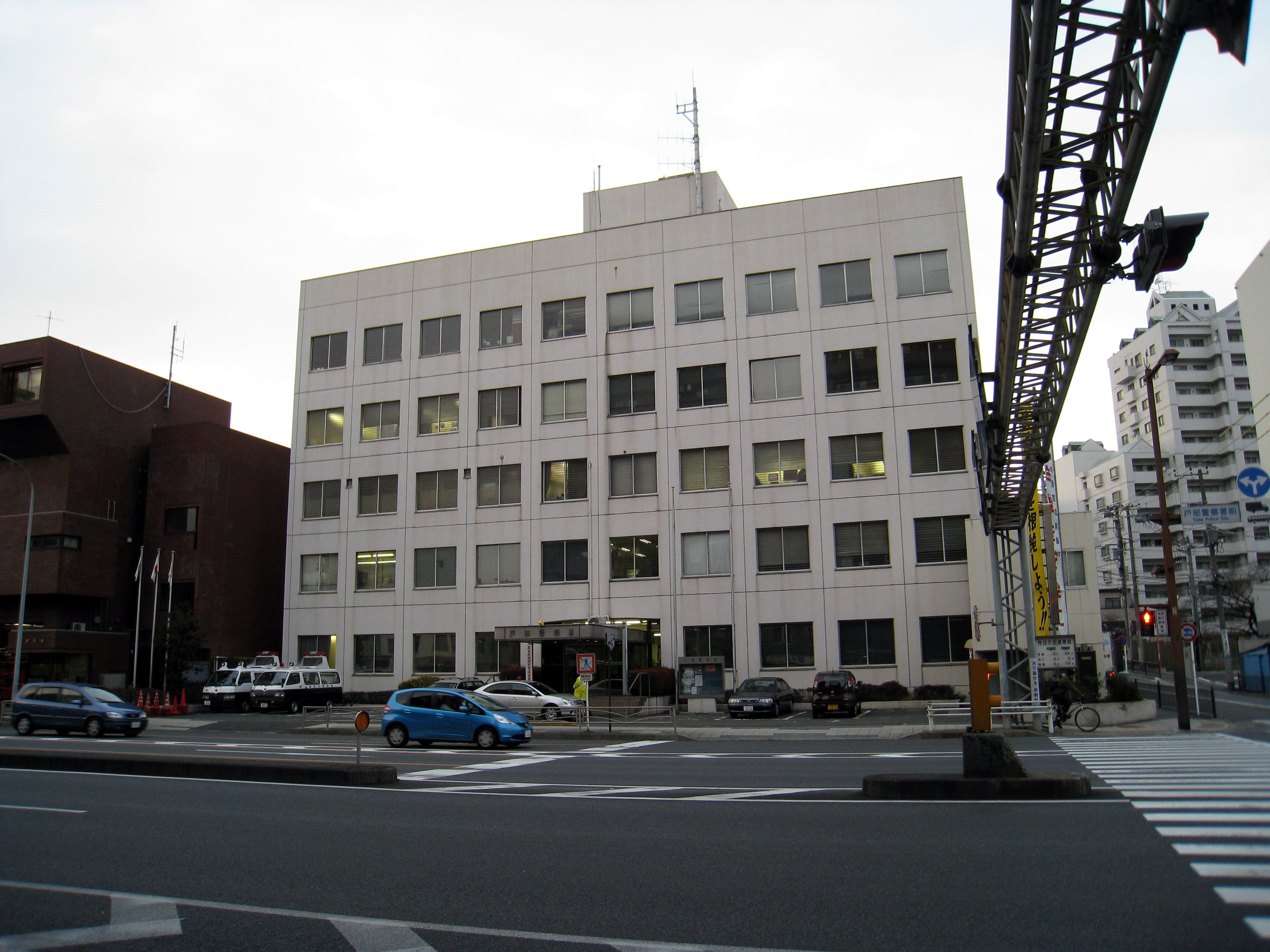
Tobe Police Department

=== Police ===
- Tobe Police Department
  - Ise Police Station
  - Takashima Police Station

=== Japan Post ===
Postal code: 220-0042

- Kanagawa Postal Office

== Education ==
=== School districts ===
- Yokohama City Tobe Elementary School
- Yokohama City Oimatsu Junior High School

== Economy ==
In 2016 there were 168 establishments employing 1,475 workers in Tobe, according to the 2016 Economic Census Survey.
