= Gōshō-ji =

Gōshō-ji is the name of numerous Buddhist temples in Japan, and may refer to:

- Gōshō-ji (Utazu) (郷照寺) in Utazu, Kagawa Prefecture, temple No. 78 in the Shikoku Pilgrimage
- Gōshō-ji (Takarazuka) (毫摂寺) in Takarazuka, Hyōgo Prefecture
