= Gosho clan =

Notable Japanese family

Gosho 御所
- Home province: Owari; Buzen
- Parent house: Fujiwara clan
- Titles: Senior Sixth Rank; Fifth Rank
- Founding year: 12th century
- Dissolution: still extant

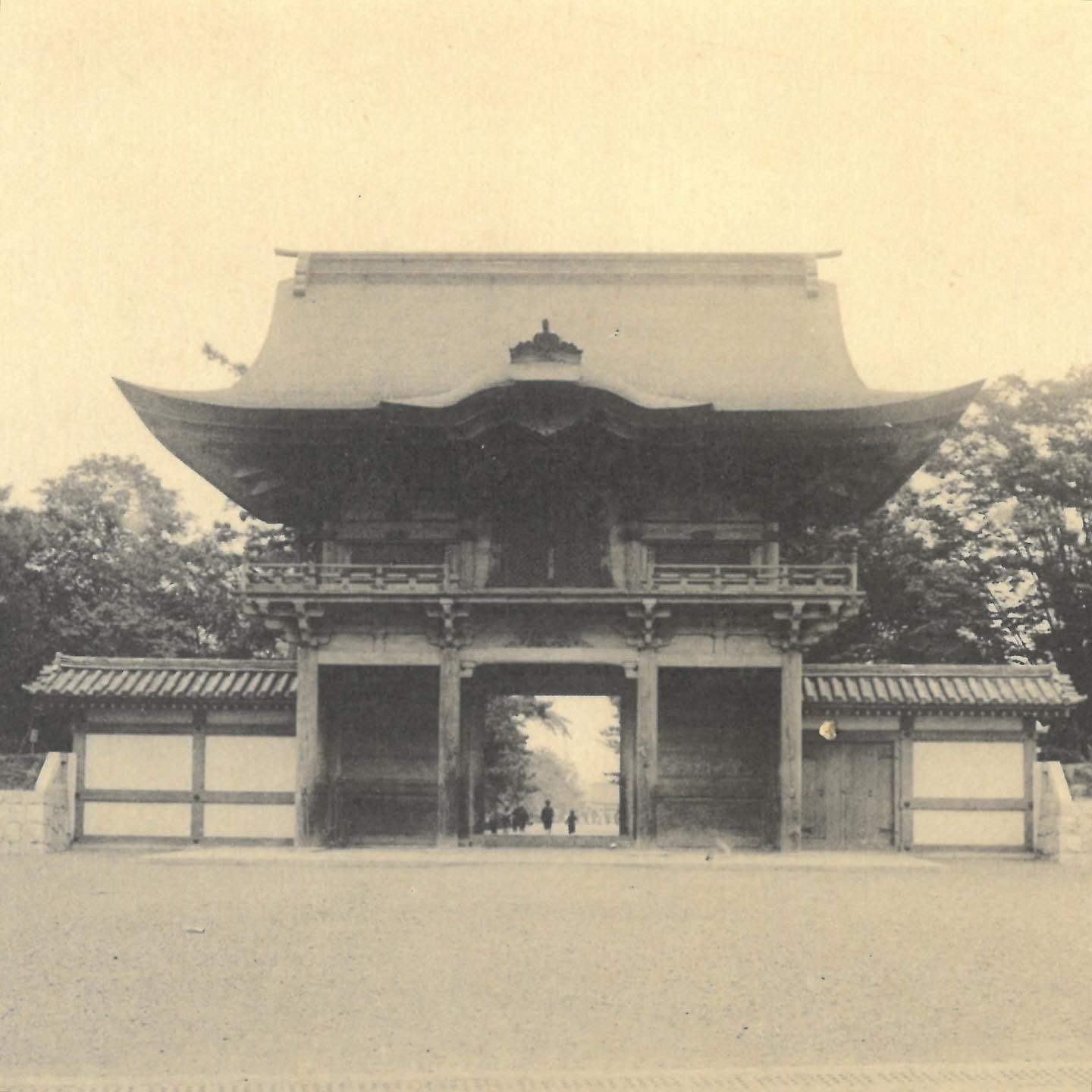
Western Gate of the Atsuta Complex where the Atsuta Palace was located (Meiji era)

The Gosho clan (御所氏 or 五所氏, Gosho-shi) is a Japanese shake family. An ancestor Gosho no Gorōmaru was a samurai and close retainer of shogun Minamoto no Yoritomo during the early Kamakura period, and members later served as shinkan officials at the Atsuta Shrine in the Nanboku-chō and Muromachi periods. They have been a prominent family (meizoku) in Usa, Buzen Province, in the area of Fukuoka and Ōita Prefecture.

== Origins ==
According to Fujiwara Shizoku Seishi Ichiran, the Gosho clan is a branch of the Fujiwara clan. Their origins are in Atsuta, Owari Province (present-day Atsuta, Nagoya, Aichi Prefecture). They took the name Gosho from the Atsuta Palace (Atsuta Gosho) that they lived in as the daikan of the Atsuta Shrine.

== History ==
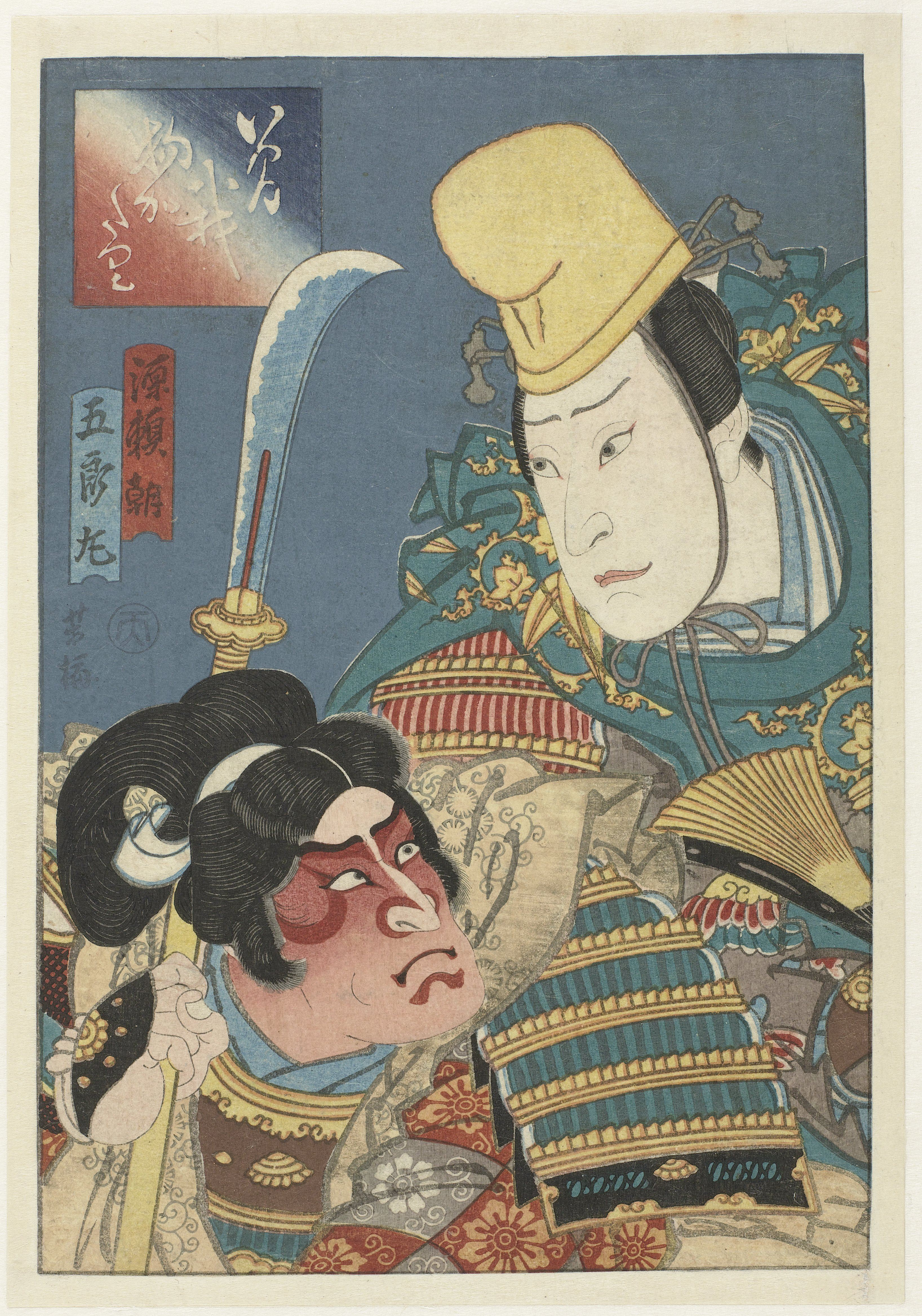
Gosho no Gorōmaru and Minamoto no Yoritomo (Utagawa Yoshiume)

In the late 12th century, Gosho no Gorōmaru became a close retainer of shogun Minamoto no Yoritomo, and is recorded in the historical chronicle Azuma Kagami and the chronicle-tale Soga Monogatari. In 1193, Gorōmaru participated in the shogun's grand hunting event Fuji no Makigari, during which on June 28, 1193, the Soga brothers, Soga Sukenari and Soga Tokimune, killed Kudō Suketsune and planned an attack on the shogun, an incident known as the Revenge of the Soga Brothers. The brothers began a bloodbath at the event during which Sukenari was killed and after which Gorōmaru apprehended Tokimune before he could attack the shogun. Gorōmaru's apprehension of Tokimune marked an end to the revenge incident, and this story survives in noh and kabuki Sogamono theater.

According to legend, Gosho no Gorōmaru was the lord of Tobe (in present-day Yokohama) in the Kamakura period and succeeded the former lands of the Mutō clan. A tomb of Gorōmaru and a monument exist in Goshoyama, Yokohama, part of the historic Tobe, but there is no further information on his activities in the area. Tobe was originally territory of the Mutō clan until Mutō Sukeyori descended to Kyushu and established the Shōni clan. However, apart from legend, it remains uncertain who succeeded the Mutō clan's domains in Musashi Province. Goshogaoka, Goshogayatsu and Goshonoyato in Koshigoe, Kamakura, Kanagawa Prefecture are named after Gorōmaru's mansion whose remains exist there.

In June 1196, the Gosho clan descended to Kyushu with Ōtomo Yoshinao, the newly appointed Governor of Buzen and Bungo Provinces and Defense Commissioner of the West who was also a retainer of Yoritomo. On June 11, 1196, they entered Kyushu from Hamawakiura, Hayami, Bungo Province (present-day Ōita Prefecture).

Later, members served in several positions such as magistrate general (sōbugyō) or administrator general (sōkengyō) of the Atsuta Shrine. They succeeded the court rank of Senior Sixth Rank and the position of officer of divine offerings (ōuchibito), a position passed down from generation to generation in the Moribe no Sukune clan, and began the hereditary succession of the position. Gosho no Gorōmaru's (a descendant of the 12th century Gosho no Gorōmaru) son, head priest (saishu) Hataya Taifu Masatsugu, succeeded as ōuchibito in 1334. In 1442, Moribe Gorōmaru succeeded the same position. In 1470, Moribe Yasutomi was appointed Fifth Rank. The Moribes, along with several members of the Gosho clan succeeding the name Moribe, served as ōuchibito of the Atsuta Shrine from 686 until 1872 for over 1,100 years from first generation Moribe no Sukune Hikoya until 24th generation Moribe Kiyonobu.

The Gosho clan has been a prominent family (meizoku) in Usa, Buzen Province (part of present-day Fukuoka and northern Ōita Prefecture). In Usa, Ōita Prefecture, the tradition says they are descendants of shinkan of the Atsuta Shrine.

== See also ==
- Atsuta Shrine
- Kamakura shogunate
- Gosho no Gorōmaru
