= Gōshō-ji (Takarazuka) =

Buddhist temple in Hyōgo Prefecture, Japan

Gōshō-ji 毫摂寺
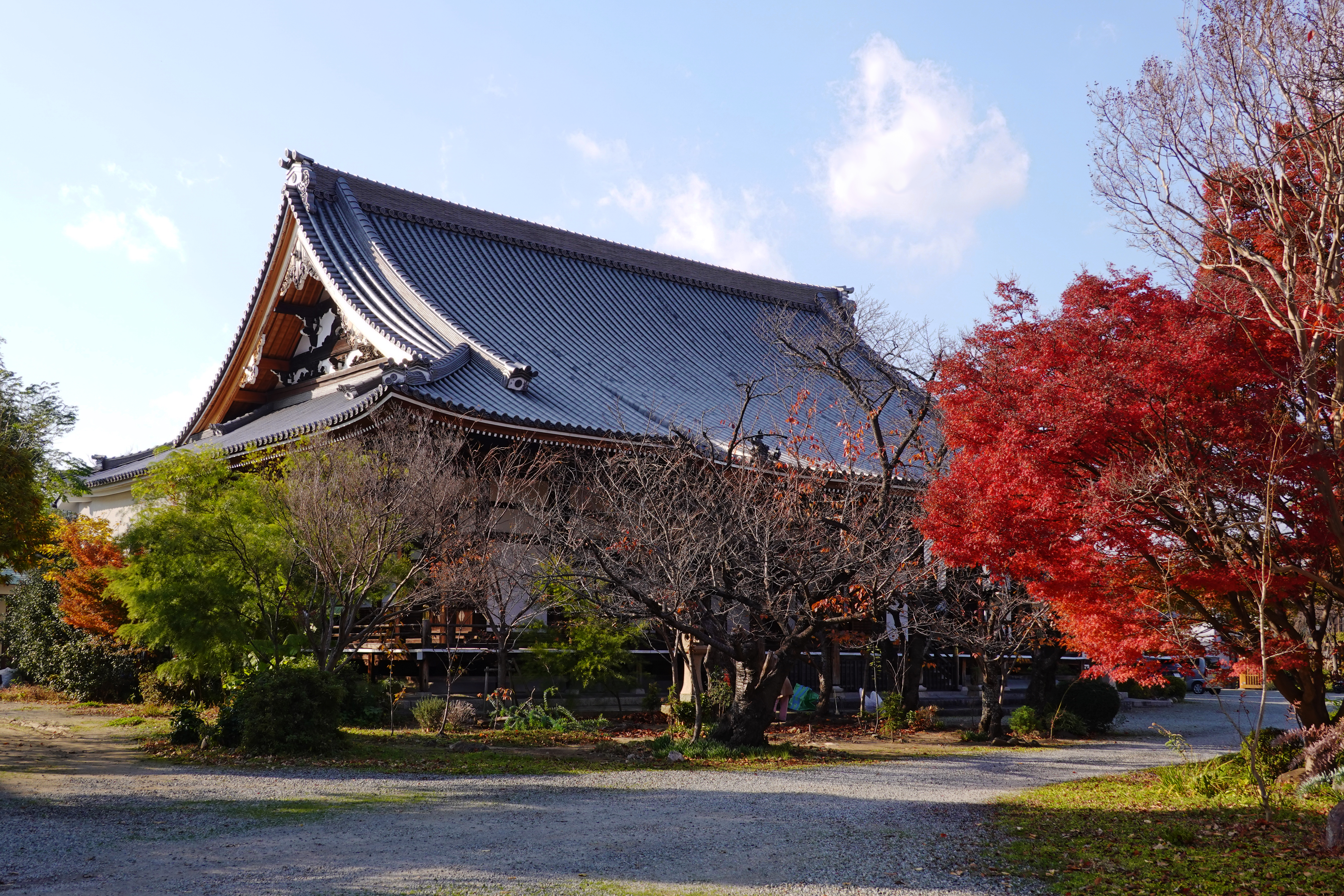

- Location within Japan

Religion
- Affiliation: Jōdo Shinshū Honganji-ha

Location
- Location: 5-5-12 Kohama, Takarazuka, Hyōgo Prefecture
- Country: Japan
- Coordinates: 34°48′24″N 135°21′52″E

Architecture
- Founder: Yoshihide
- Completed: 15th century

Gōshō-ji (毫摂寺, gōshō-ji) is a Jōdo Shinshū Buddhist temple in Takarazuka, Hyōgo Prefecture, Japan. The other name of this temple is Kohama-gobō (小浜御坊). Kohama is the name of the area around the temple and along the Arima Kaidō, which connected Osaka and Kyoto to Arima Onsen during the Edo period.

== History ==
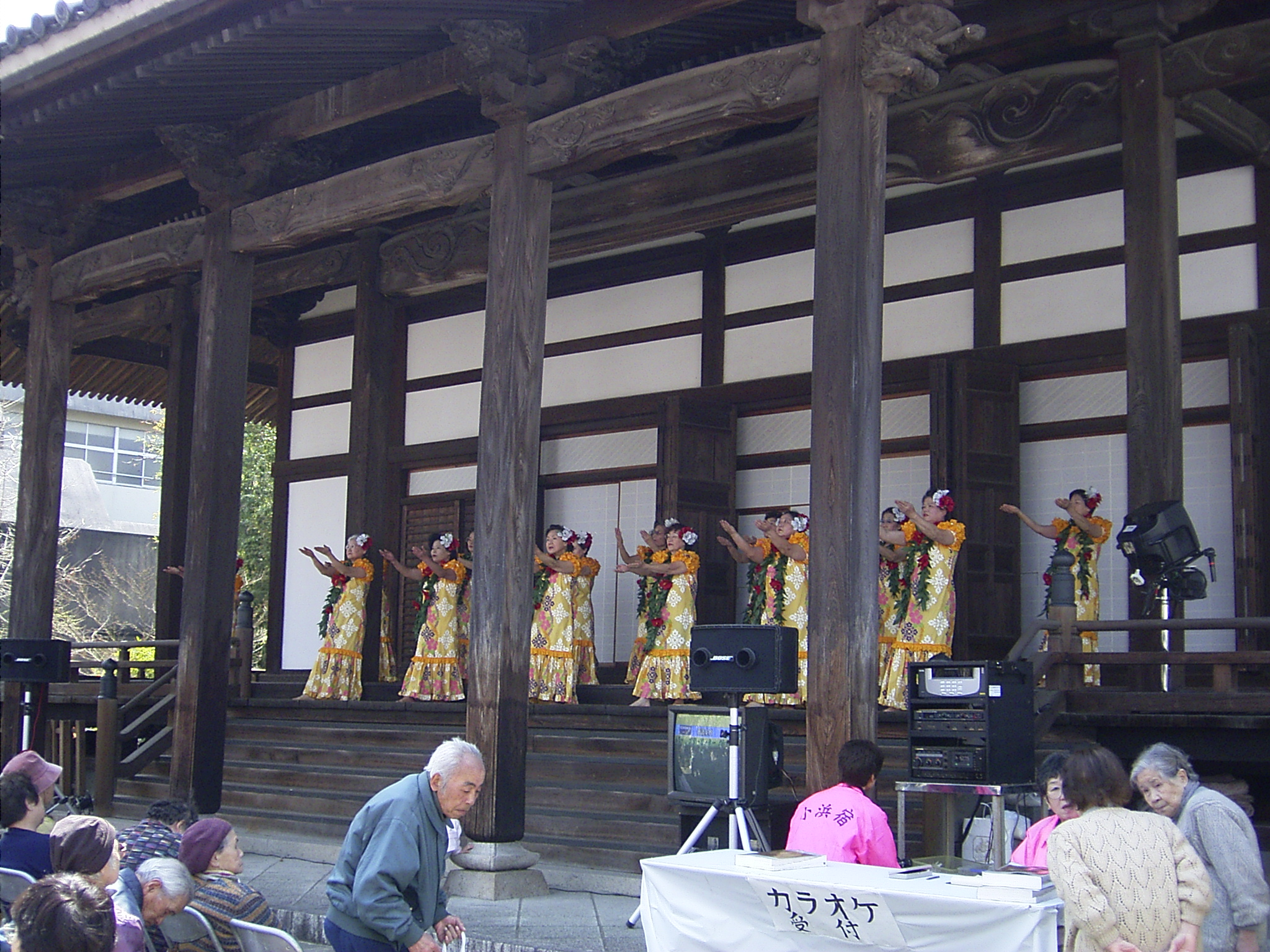
Gōshō-ji

Gōshō-ji is said to have been established during the Meiō era (1492 to 1501). During the Sengoku period of the 16th century, the town of Kohama developed into a typical temple town (寺内町 jinai-machi) around Gōshō-ji. However, the town and the temple were burned down by General Fukushima Masanori (福島正則) in 1595, by order of Toyotomi Hideyoshi, because it was the hometown of one of the wives of Toyotomi Hidetsugu, called either Kohama-hime (小浜姫) or Kame-hime (亀姫). Hideyoshi had already killed both Hidetsugu and his Kame-hime. Even though Hidetsugu was a nephew of Hideyoshi, his loyalty came into doubt and Hideyoshi suspected he might try to usurp power from either him or Toyotomi Hideyori, the only son of Hideyoshi.

During the Meiji Period, Gōshō-ji was given the title of bekkaku (別格, special) by the sect.

== Access ==
- Mefu-Jinja Station of Hankyu Takarazuka Line
