= Kamonyama Park =

Park in Yokohama, Japan

Coordinates: 35°27′11″N 139°37′32″E

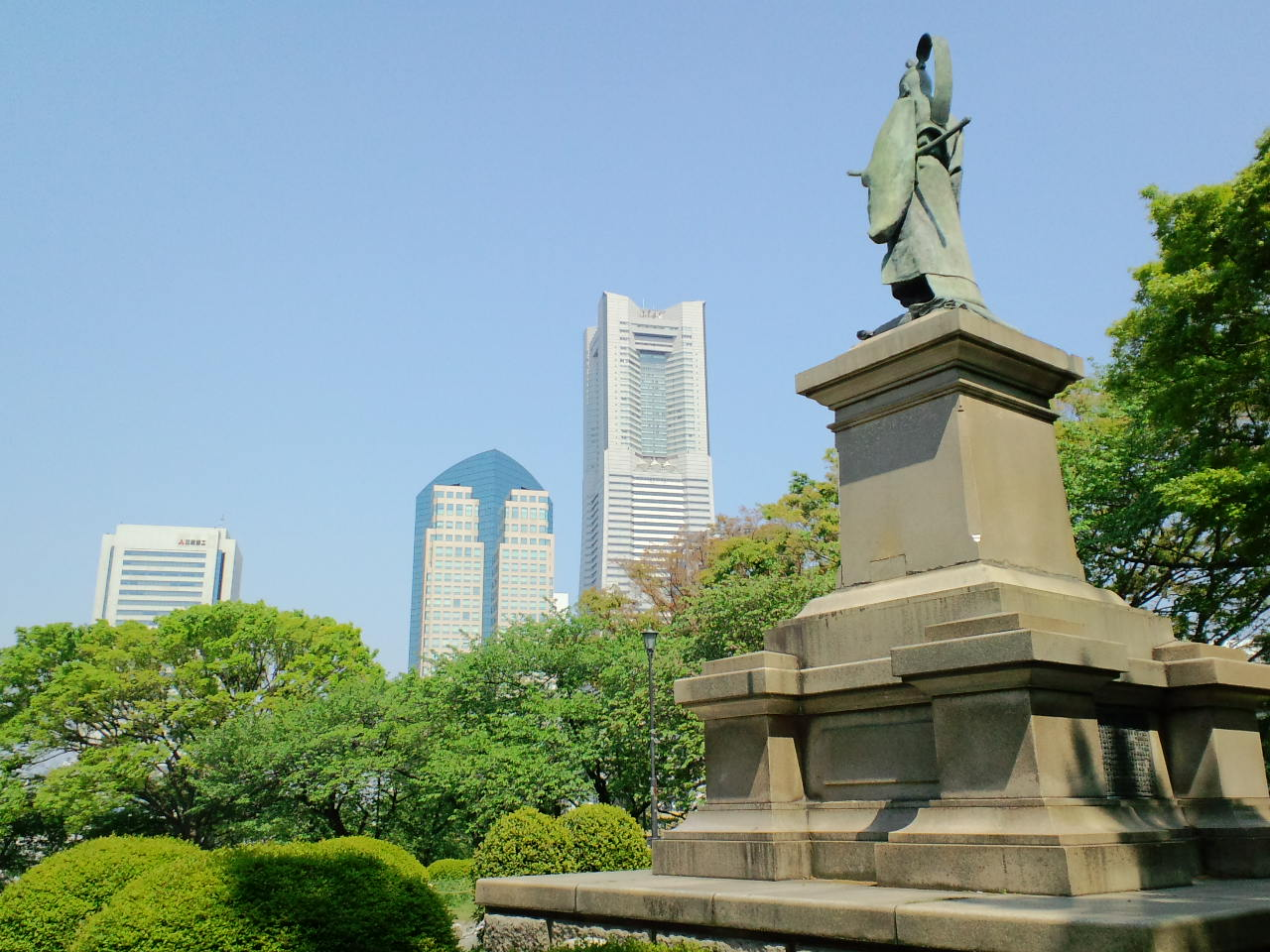
Kamonyama Park, Yokohama, Japan, with the tall buildings of Minato Mirai 21 in the background

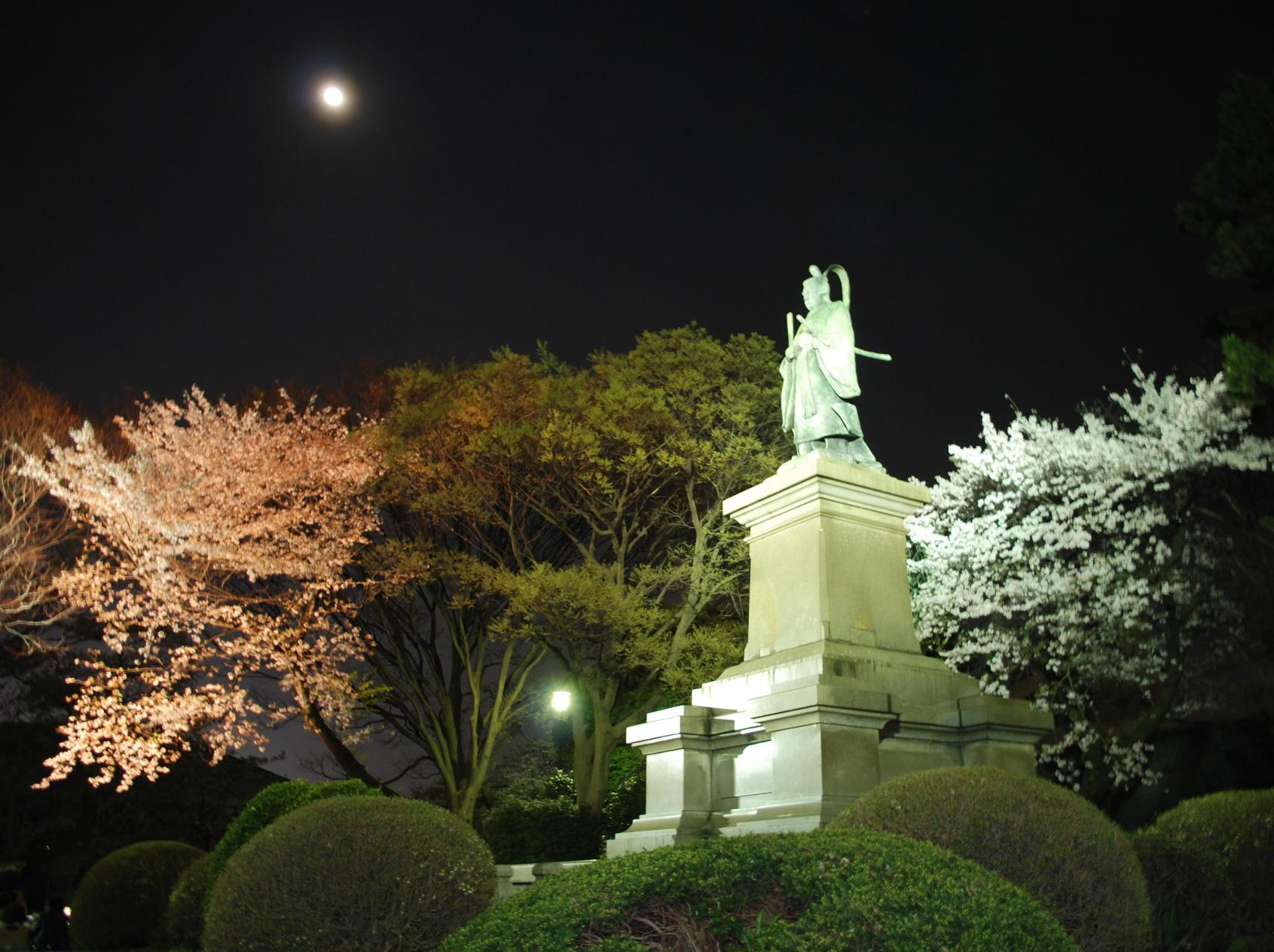
Cherry blossom viewing in Kamonyama Park, at night

Kamonyama Park (Japanese: 掃部山公園) is a park in Nishi-ku, Yokohama City, Kanagawa Prefecture, Japan. Located on a hill overlooking Minato Mirai 21, a statue of Naosuke Li, who played key role in the opening of Yokohama Port in 1859, stands in the park. the park is also a popular destination for cherry blossoms during spring.

== History ==
Until the Edo period, it was simply a hill overlooking the sea, and was called Fudoyama.

In the early Meiji era, as the official residences of the foreign railway engineers, such as Edmund Morel, who was involved in the opening of Japan's first railway between Shimbashi Station (now Shiodome Freight Terminal) and Yokohama Station (currently Sakuragicho Station), were built there. This place was called Railway Hill.

The hill was purchased by the Hikone Domain in 1884, and became the property of the Li family. In 1909, a statue of Naosuke Ii was erected to commemorate the 50th anniversary of the opening of Yokohama Port. At the unveiling ceremonies, Aritomo Yamagata, Hirobumi Ito, Masayoshi Matsukata, and Kaoru Inoue were all absent, as they were against the memorandum of the statue's purpose, with Ii as the person who opened the country. After that, it came to be called Kamonyama from "Kamon-no-kami", which was Naosuke Ii's official position in the Edo shogunate.

In 1914, the hill was donated to Yokohama City by the Li family and was renamed as Kamonyama Park. During World War II, Li's statue was removed by the government's metal recovery instructions, but in 1954, the statue was rebuilt by the city of Yokohama to commemorate the 100th anniversary of the opening of the country.

About 200 cherry trees were planted in the park and In 1996, the Yokohama Noh Theater was built inside of the park.

== Transportation ==
Kamonyama Park is a 10-minute walk from Sakuragicho Station.

== See also ==
- Excursion destinations in Yokohama
