= Library of Ruina =

2021 deck-building video game

- Developer: Project Moon
- Publishers: Project Moon (PC, XONE); Arc System Works (NS, PS4)
- Platforms: Windows; Xbox One; Nintendo Switch; PlayStation 4
- Release: Windows, Xbox One; August 10, 2021; Nintendo Switch, PS4; April 25, 2024
- Genres: Role-playing, deck-building, visual novel
- Mode: Single-player

Library of Ruina is an indie deck-building role-playing game developed and published by Project Moon. Initially released for Windows and Xbox One on August 10, 2021, it is a sequel to the 2018 game Lobotomy Corporation.

The game generally received positive reviews for PC, but mixed to negative reviews on console. A sequel, Limbus Company, was released in 2023 for Windows, iOS, and Android devices. The light novel The Distortion Detective is a side story that takes place during the events of Library of Ruina. Project Moon's manhwa, Leviathan, (later turned into a web novel) is an interquel that takes place between Library of Ruina's true ending and the start of Limbus Company.

== Gameplay ==
=== Overview ===
The titular library is split up into ten unlockable floors for fighting against enemies, or "guests", in battles known as "receptions". Before the start of each reception, players enter the preparation phase where they can change equipment and inspect opponents' stats, including HP, Stagger Resist (SR), resistance values, and equipment. A reception may span over multiple acts; players upon clearing an act will return to the preparation phase for the next act. Librarians' equipment cannot be changed in-between acts; they lose status effects that retain from the last act, but will keep their HP and Emotion level, and their Stagger Resist is recovered to full.

Library of Ruina's story is primarily shown in a visual novel format. Cutscenes about guests and miscellaneous discussions are shown once a reception starts and ends, typically delivered through conversations between two library residents, Angela and Roland.

=== Combat ===
A screen shot depicting gameplay for Library of Ruina during a reception.

The player's main method of defeating guests is with Combat pages, which are items used to attack and defend in combat through predetermined actions. The number of Combat Pages usable in a single Scene is equal to the number of Speed Dice a character has. Attacks deal both physical and stagger damage, affecting characters' HP and SR respectively. If a character's SR reaches zero, they will be unable to move and receive fatal damage from all attacks until their SR resets the next turn. A character dies (for the ongoing reception) if their HP reaches 0.

Upon starting the Scene, all characters' Speed dice will randomly roll a low or high number or value, determining its Speed and the order of characters' actions. Librarians can redirect Combat pages towards them if they possess higher Speed than their target. Most characters (except bosses) start a reception with 1 or 2 Speed dice.

If a librarian redirects a Combat page or opposes a Combat page directed at them, they enter a clash where both sides' Combat pages' actions interact with each other. Two dice will roll and the highest value will act; if both dice roll the same value, actions will be canceled out. Else, the attack counts as a one-sided action where attacks are not opposed.

The player needs to carefully manage available resources, namely 'Light' (a form of combat stamina) and Combat pages, which return into the deck to be randomly picked upon usage. If the librarian's current Light is lower than the cost of any available Combat page, or if the librarian has no Combat pages to initiate action, they will be unable to act. Light points and Combat pages are naturally restored by one unit per turn or by raising the Emotion level of that character, which will restore all Light points.

Emotion level is a mechanic that raises whenever a character wins or loses a clash, or when their dice rolls its maximum or minimum value. The group will gain an emotional level-up after their average emotion level reaches a certain point. When the emotion level rises, the player must choose one Abnormality page to apply to a librarian. Abnormality pages come in two colors, green (Awakening) and red (Breakdown), each with its own beneficial effects and drawbacks. The emotion level can rise up to five times per battle, with a total of five Abnormality pages to be picked.

=== Key and Combat pages ===
After clearing a battle, the player will receive books of the defeated enemies. Burning these books randomly gives the player Key pages and Combat pages, color-coded based on rarity and quantity. Colors including green (paperback), blue (hardcover), purple (limited), and gold (objet d'art) are available. (green being the lowest rarity, and gold being the highest) You can only have a set number of copies per key page. (5 greens, 4 blues, 3 purples, and 1 gold)

Key pages serve as the game's "armor" items and can be assigned to the librarians. Each gives unique stats, damage resistances, and passives. For game progression purposes, players' Key pages may not share the same strengths or vulnerabilities with the characters as enemies.

Combat pages are the game's "weapon" items. Some Combat pages are unique to a specific character and their Key pages. Pages will have at least one offensive (attacking an enemy) or defensive (defending against attacks or dodging attacks entirely) die, color-coded in red and blue, respectively.

The unique yellow-colored "Counter" die is played against an unopposed Combat page and can replay upon winning a clash until the unopposed Combat page ends. While most Combat pages are melee, there are ranged Combat pages that take action before Melee pages, Mass Attack pages that take first action regardless of Speed, and On Play pages that take effect immediately upon selecting a target.

=== Abnormality battles ===
Players can fight in Abnormality battles, boosting the respective floor's realization level and power. Many of the Abnormalities present in-game originate from the prequel, Lobotomy Corporation. Every Abnormality battle has a certain gimmick or mechanic the player must figure out to defeat them.

After completing an Abnormality battle, a new librarian will be unlocked for the floor. Including the Patron Librarian, five librarians in total will be available per floor. Players can customize a librarian's name, appearance, and combat dialogue. Completing Abnormality battles also grants Abnormality pages used in battles. The Abnormality pages can be split into two categories: Awakening and Breakdown. The Awakening Abnormality cards are the green ones and provide a small benefit with no downsides. The Breakdown Abnormality cards are red, with both a strong benefit and a downside. The severity of the downside depends on the card itself.

=== Floor realizations ===
After the player has completed all of the Abnormality battles on a floor, they can begin the floor's Realization: a multi-segmented puzzle battle against either Angela or Roland as they suffer from an emotional meltdown, taking after the floor's Abnormalities' appearances and abilities. Completing the Floor realization will grant E.G.O. pages exclusive to that floor. While not mandatory, only through completing all Floor realizations (sans the Kether floor) can the player unlock the game's true ending.

== Plot ==
=== Setting ===
Library of Ruina takes place in a dystopian world known as the City, which is made of twenty-six districts. The City is governed by a reclusive organization known as the Head, while the Nests are run by Wings, mega-corporations that harness powerful technologies known as Singularities. The backstreets are crime-riddled areas controlled by various crime syndicates. Outside of the City are the Outskirts, a barren hell-like wasteland, and the Ruins, eldritch landscapes beyond the Outskirts.

Throughout the City, there are many offices run by Fixers, mercenaries regulated by the government. Each Fixer is assigned a grade (from rank 9 to color fixer) based on their skill and experience.

Following the events of Lobotomy Corporation, the AI Angela creates the Library out of the light produced by Lobotomy Corporation's Seed of Light, creating an incident known as the "White Nights and Dark Days". This incident and its aftermath, mainly the Distortion phenomenon, directly influence the game's plot. The Library is divided into multiple floors, each representing a topic that corresponds to a category of the Korean Decimal System. Each floor is attended by a patron librarian, who themselves are the former Sefirot of Lobotomy Corporation, and is further managed by assistant librarians, who are former Lobotomy Corporation employees that were turned into books during the Library's creation.

Before Angela opens the Library, a low-level Fixer named Roland appears in it and is forcefully recruited by Angela to be her assistant and one of the patron librarians of the Library, managing the floor of General Works. Angela wishes to find the "one perfect book" that contains the answers she desires and turns her into a complete human. She sends out Invitations and has Roland and her other librarians battle the guests. If the guests win, they are allowed to take books from the library and leave with said rewards; if they lose, they become a book themselves, their knowledge added to the Library.

=== Story ===
The player follows Angela's journey toward the "one perfect book" in the Library from the view of Roland, a Fixer who becomes her servant after trespassing into the Library uninvited.

The story is broken up into various chapters. As Roland's past is gradually shed light on and Angela comes closer to becoming human, the Library becomes an ever-growing threat to the City, urging the Associations (organized groups of fixers, often centered around a single theme) to take action. Argalia, a mysterious Fixer known as the "Blue Reverberation" recruits various characters into a group known as the "Reverberation Ensemble" for an unknown cause, culminating in them breaking into the Library, scattering to the ten floors to claim the Light for their greatest performance that will overturn the City. The Library ultimately emerges victorious after a hard-fought battle.

Just as Angela finally gains a human body, Roland betrays Angela and reveals his true motive for coming to the Library: to make her suffer as revenge for her actions instigating the Distortion phenomenon and indirectly causing the death of his wife Angelica, a former Color Fixer known as the "Black Silence". Roland ultimately fails to defeat the Library and pleads for Angela to kill him, or he will kill her if she falters.

If all of Angela's Floor realizations have not been completed, she will kill Roland and the Librarians and obtain the one true book. Now burdened by the guilt of killing her friends and countless cityfolk, Angela refuses to leave the Library and continues her aimless destruction for years before letting a nameless follower end her life. To avoid this ending, the realizations needed to be completed are on the floors of History, Technological Sciences, Literature, and Art. If all of Roland's Floor realizations have not been completed, Roland will swiftly behead Angela before returning to the City, his life spiraling into alcoholism, drug abuse and wanton slaughter before eventually dying meaninglessly in a gutter. The player must complete the realizations of the floors of Natural Sciences, Language, Social Sciences, Philosophy, and Religion or they will be locked to this ending.

If all Floor realizations have been completed and Angela and Roland choose to forgive each other, Angela will release the culminated Light and resurrect all lives the Library has taken, kickstarting the Kether floor realization against Carmen, founder of Lobotomy Corporation's Seed of Light and actual mastermind behind the Distortion phenomenon. Meanwhile, Roland and the Library fight back the returned Reverberation Ensemble, now empowered by the Light, for 7 days; Roland saves Angela from dissipating inside the Light and kills Argalia for good.

The Library soon receives the arrival of Zena, Luda and Baral, agents sent by Head to quell dissidents against the government and those who break important rules of the City. The agents aim to expel the Library from the City, exterminate Angela as an illegal artificial intelligence, and reclaim the body of Garion, a former Arbiter of the Head who now works as one of the Library's patron librarians. Facing great retaliation from Roland and fellow librarians Gebura and Binah, the Head agents decide to instead stick to their main plan and expel the Library into the Outskirts. As they step outside of the Library, Angela and Roland reconcile as they decide to reopen the location under a new direction.

== Development ==
Library of Ruina was developed by South Korean studio Project Moon.

=== Music ===
The majority of Library of Ruina's soundtracks were created by two music studios, South Korean game sound studio Studio EIM and Japanese indie band Mili. Studio EIM composed music for the main menu, receptions, Abnormality suppressions, and floor realizations. In a typical reception, the floor's background music changes corresponding to its emotion level. For Library of Ruina, Mili made a mini album, To Kill A Living Book, with seven out of the eight songs being tailored to specific characters. A small number of other tracks were borrowed from the prequel installment, Lobotomy Corporation.

== Release ==
Library of Ruina was initially released for Windows via Steam's early access program on May 15, 2020, before being fully released for Windows and Xbox One on August 10, 2021. Versions for Nintendo Switch and PlayStation 4 were made available by publisher Arc System Works on April 25, 2024.

== Reception ==
Reception

Aggregate score
Aggregator	Score
Metacritic	NS: 55/100

Review scores
Publication	Score
Nintendo Life	4/10
TouchArcade	3.5/5
Siliconera	7/10

The Nintendo Switch version received "mixed or average" reviews according to review aggregator Metacritic.

Daniel Tack of Game Informer praised the game's music, mechanics, and narrative, but did not give the game an official rating. Alice Bell of Rock Paper Shotgun described the game as "extremely odd" and "extremely terrifying". Russell Troxel praised the game, stating that it is "worth every penny they’re asking".

On consoles, the game was generally positively noted for its narrative and voice acting, but was criticized for its performance issues, confusing gameplay and sluggish interface. Shaun Musgrave, in his review on TouchArcade, said the Nintendo Switch version has "fantastic characters and sublime music" with a new Japanese voiceover option. He found the console version's stability issues a downgrade from the PC counterpart, which he noted was already poorly optimized, and commented its text size is too small to be playable.

Charlie Wacholz of Nintendo Life gave it a negative review, criticizing confusing gameplay, clunky menus, and performance issues. He found the game difficult to play in longer sessions due to its text being almost illegible on screen, and compare its trial-and-error gameplay to "a mild bout of Stockholm Syndrome". He scored it a 4 out of 10. Kazuma Hashimoto from Siliconera left a mixed review, calling its voice acting "top notch" and enjoying its turn-based battle system for its complexity. However, he noted the Nintendo Switch version suffers from slapdash interface, whose font size is too cramped and small to read, especially in handheld mode. He rated the game 7 out of 10.
