= Gosho no Gorōmaru =

Gosho no Gorōmaru 御所五郎丸
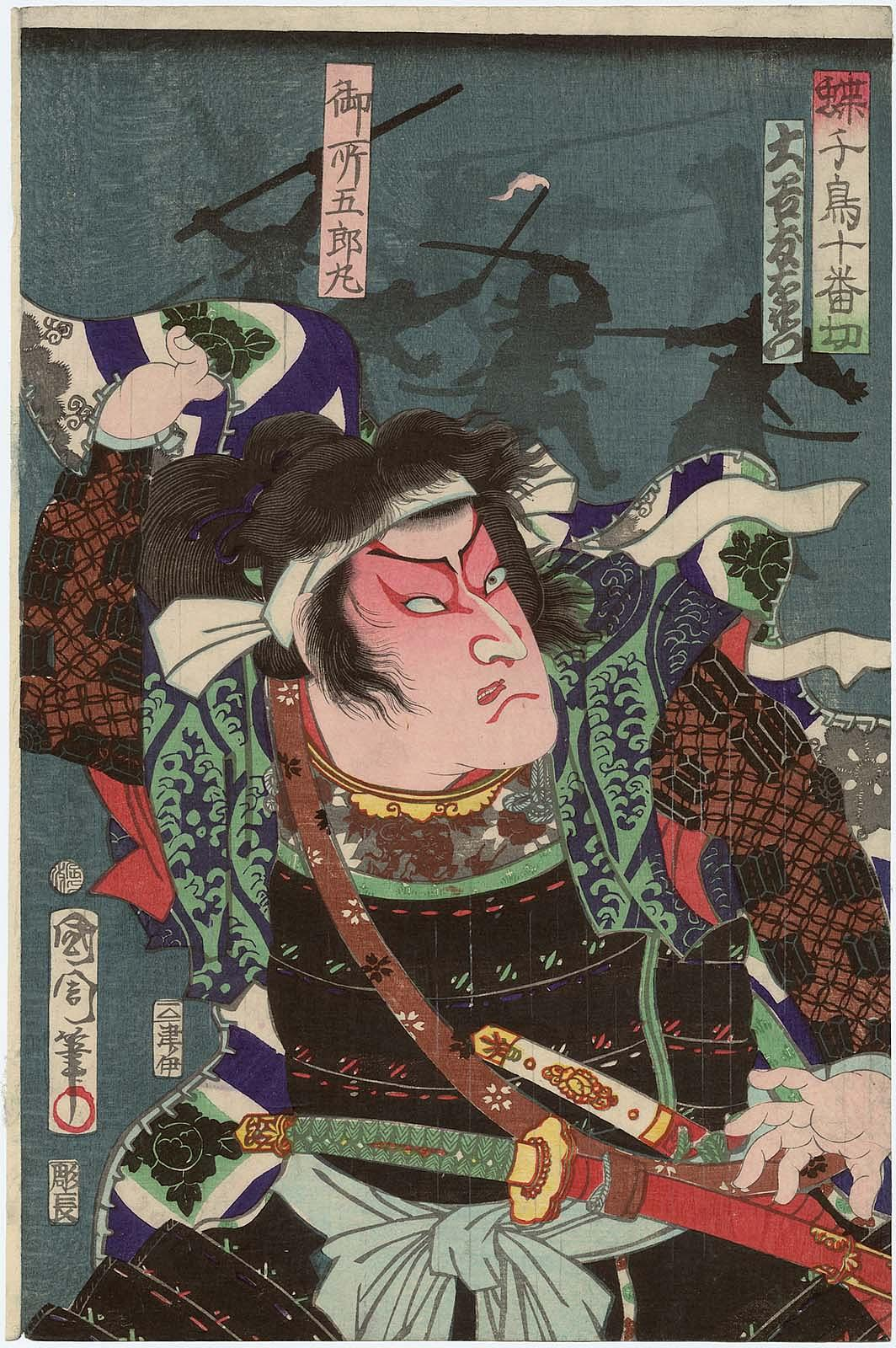
- Chō chidori jūbankiri: Gosho no Gorōmaru Woodblock print by Toyohara Kunichika
- Born: Heian-kyō, Japan
- Died: after 1193
- Other name: Shigemune
- Occupation: Samurai

Gosho no Gorōmaru (御所 五郎丸) was a Japanese samurai and retainer of the Kamakura Shogunate in the late Heian and early Kamakura period. He is best known for saving the shogun Minamoto no Yoritomo during the Revenge of the Soga Brothers incident in 1193 by capturing Soga Tokimune. According to legend, he was the lord of Tobe. His legacy survives in noh and kabuki drama and in place names in Kanagawa Prefecture. In kabuki he is known as Gosho no Gorozō. His imina is Shigemune (重宗) but he is best known by his azana Gorōmaru.

== Life ==
According to Soga Monogatari, Gorōmaru was born in Heian-kyō (present-day Kyoto). He served as a samurai at the Enryaku-ji temple, but left the capital at the age of 16 after avenging the death of his lord. He then moved to Amari Manor in Kai Province (present-day Nirasaki, Yamanashi Prefecture), and was a retainer of Ichijō Tadayori. Gorōmaru became well known for his great strength and horse-riding skills.

After Tadayori was killed in 1184, it is said that Gorōmaru became a retainer of Minamoto no Yoritomo after Yoritomo had thought that, "He is an excellent man" upon seeing him. Gorōmaru became a close retainer of Yoritomo and is said to have been his favorite.

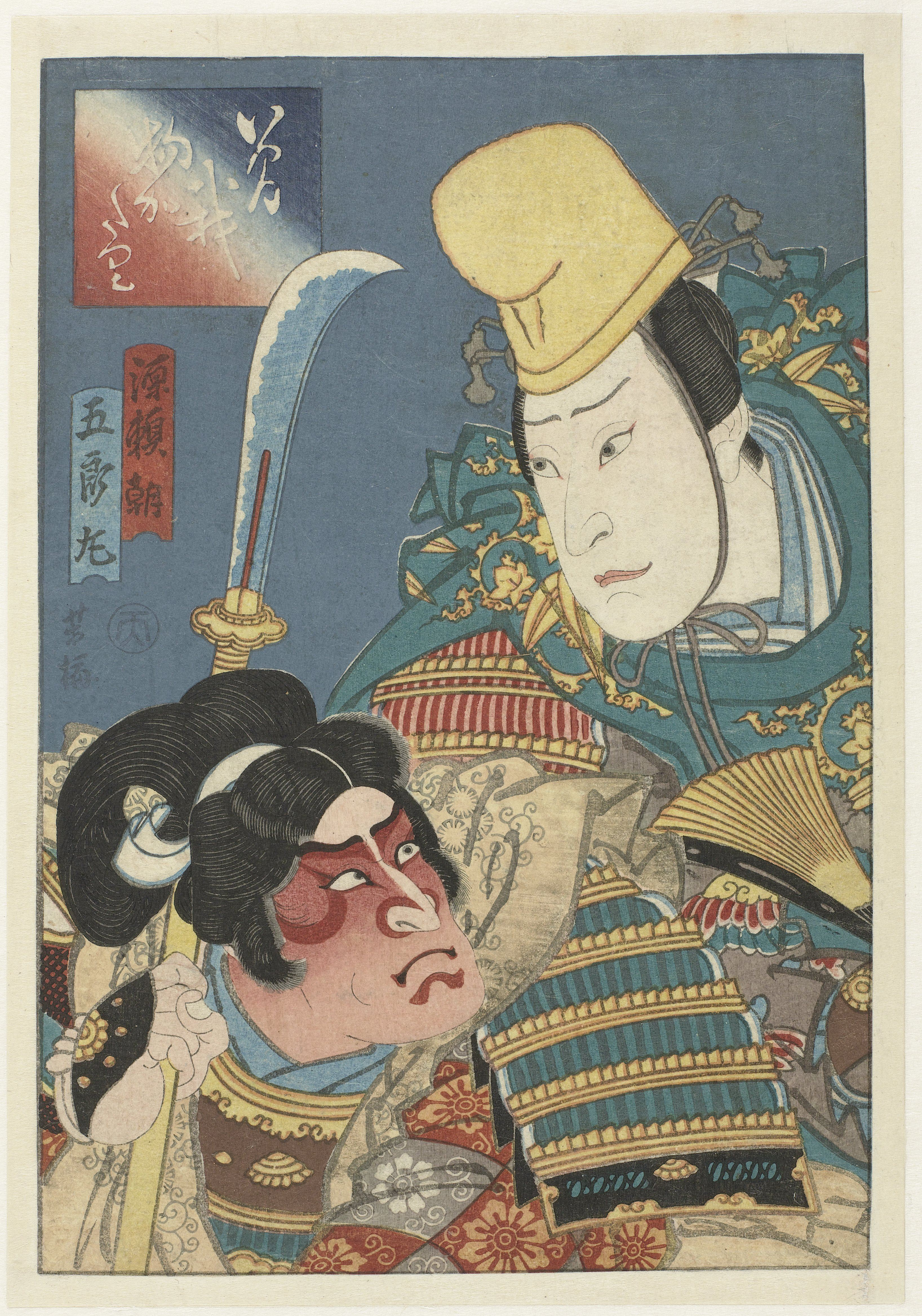
Gosho no Gorōmaru with Minamoto no Yoritomo by Utagawa Yoshiume

In June 1193, Gorōmaru participated in the grand hunting event Fuji no Makigari held by shogun Minamoto no Yoritomo. On June 28, 1193, the Soga brothers killed Kudō Suketsune at the event and planned an attack on the shogun, an incident known as the Revenge of the Soga Brothers. The brothers began a bloodbath at the event, defeating ten samurai and slashing many others, during which the elder brother Soga Sukenari was killed by Nitta Tadatsune. The younger brother Soga Tokimune set off to find the shogun and stormed into the shogun's mansion. Gorōmaru, who had been keeping an eye on the situation at the mansion, apprehended Tokimune before he could attack the shogun. According to Soga Monogatari, Gorōmaru locked Tokimune's elbows, tried to bring him down with his own weight and shouted that he had apprehended the enemy. It is said that Tokimune struggled and tried to find his sword, but gave up when he could not find it. Tokimune was tied up for questioning and executed the next day. Gorōmaru's apprehension of Tokimune marked an end to the Revenge of the Soga Brothers incident.

According to legend, Gorōmaru was the lord of Tobe (in present-day Yokohama) in the Kamakura period and succeeded the former lands of the Mutō clan. A tomb of Gosho no Gorōmaru and a monument exist in Goshoyama, Yokohama, part of the historic Tobe, but there is no further information on his activities in the area. Tobe was originally territory of the Mutō clan until Mutō Sukeyori descended to Kyushu and established the Shōni clan. However, apart from legend, it remains uncertain who succeeded the Mutō clan's domains in Musashi Province.

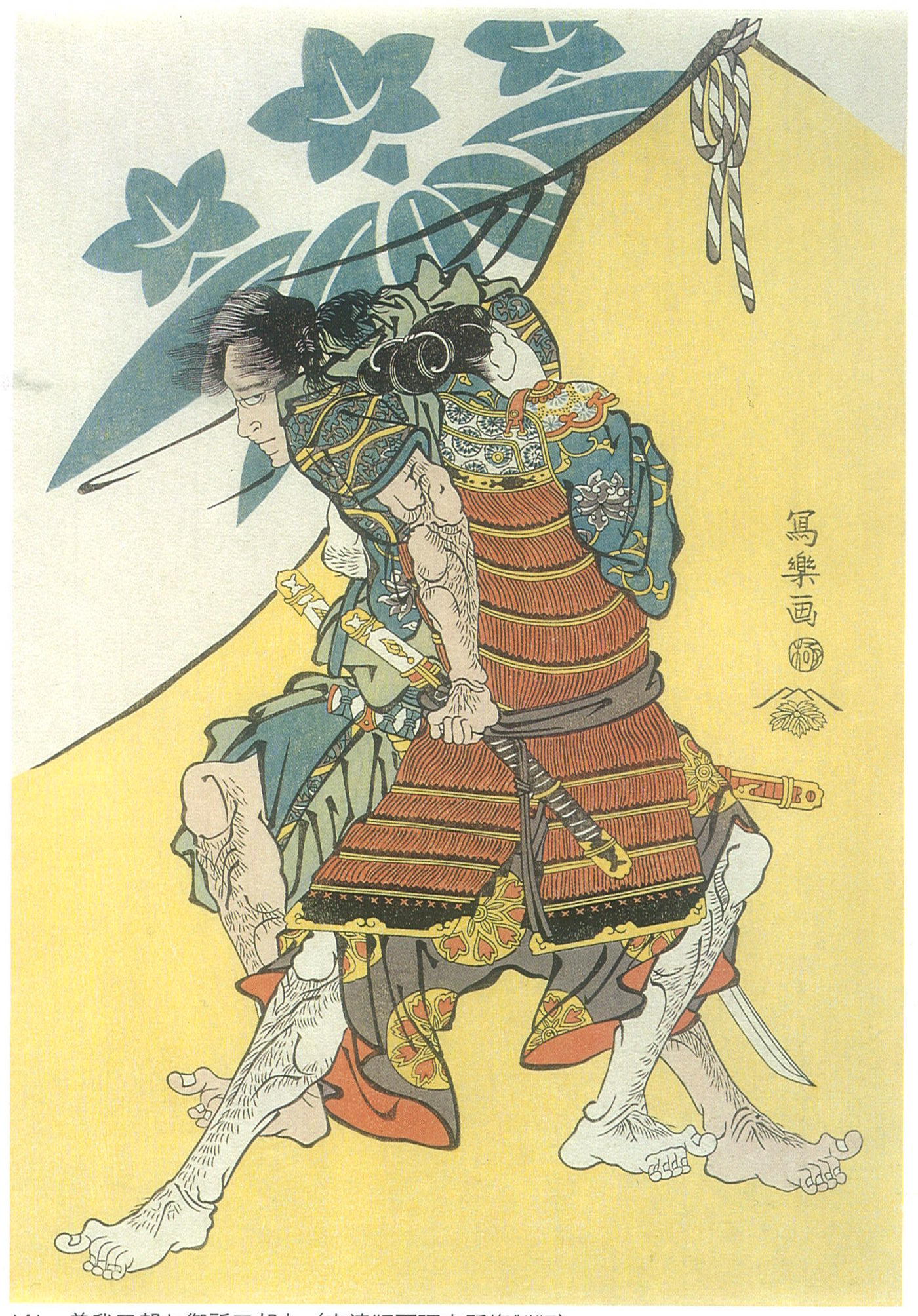
Gosho no Gorōmaru capturing Soga Tokimune by Sharaku

Gorōmaru is said to have been an excellent horse-rider and a man of valor with "the strength of seventy-five people". Kanabon Soga Monogatari describes Gorōmaru: "Among them, Gorōmaru appears superior. Wearing a one-shaku-eight-sun [54.5 cm or 1.8 ft] tachi in his moegiodoshi dō-maru [light green-braided armor], he lightly struck with a knurled seven-shaku [2.1 m or 6.9 ft] iron pole and stood on the shank of the horse." Jūbangiri describes Gorōmaru saying, "He is eighteen years old, but has the strength of eighty-five people." During Tokimune's questioning, Tokimune is said to have explained that he had mistaken Gorōmaru for a regular retainer, and would have attacked him right away had he recognized him.

In Soga Monogatari, it is written that Gorōmaru put a women's usuginu (a thin robe) over his haramaki armor, supposedly disguising as a woman catching Tokimune off guard. It is said that this was against the morals of samurai (bushidō), and Gorōmaru was exiled from Kamakura to Yagoshima in Kai Province. However, the Kamakura period Azuma Kagami and the early version of Soga Monogatari do not mention him disguising as a woman; this was most likely added later for dramatization.

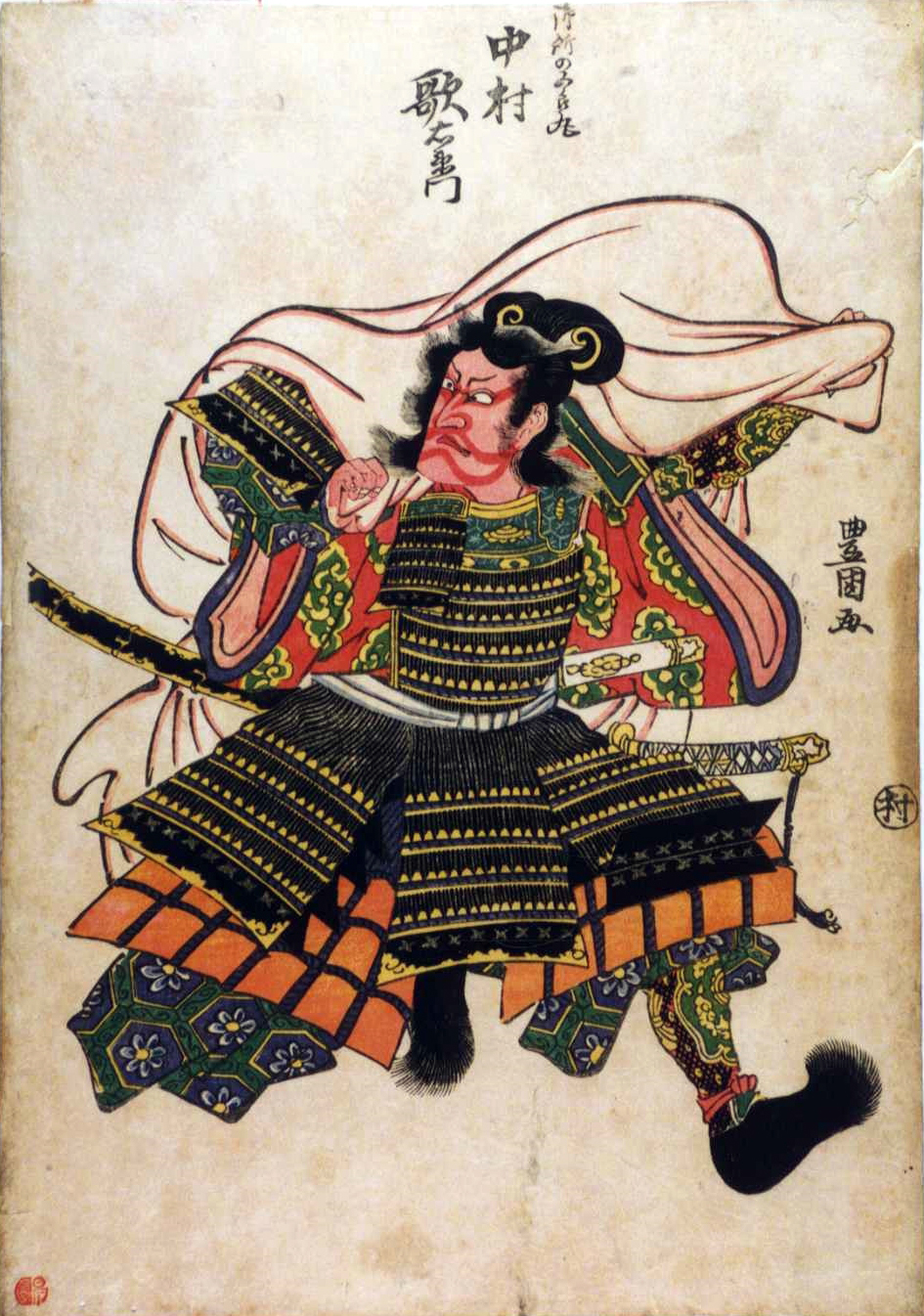
Gosho no Gorōmaru by Utagawa Toyokuni

== Genealogy ==
Gorōmaru is an ancestor to the Gosho family. The name Gosho originated from the Atsuta Palace (Atsuta Gosho) where a member of the family lived in as the daikan of Atsuta Shrine in Owari Province. Gorōmaru's descendants later went to Kyushu with Ōtomo Yoshinao.

== Historic sites ==
The remains of Gorōmaru's mansion and a stone monument can be found in Gosho no Gorōmaru Park located in Goshogaoka, Koshigoe, Kamakura, Kanagawa Prefecture. There are large stones which are said to be garden stones of the mansion. The place names Goshogaoka, Goshogayatsu and Goshonoyato in the Koshigoe area derive from the mansion. There is also Gosho Tanuki Park nearby in Gosho, Koshigoe.

In Goshoyama, Yokohama, there is a tomb of Gosho no Gorōmaru, which is protected by the Goshoyama Town Council. It is said that Gorōmaru lived in the Goshoyama area. The tomb has a gorintō pagoda, a shrine, and a black marble monument describing Gorōmaru's involvement in the Revenge of the Soga Brothers incident and the history of the tomb. An annual Gosho no Gorōmaru festival, featuring a parade with a portable shrine and dashi, is held on May 5 by the town council and Gorōmaru Association. A number of human bones were discovered near the tomb, and the area may be a gravesite of Daikyō-ji temple whose time of foundation and closing are unknown.

There is a tomb of Gosho no Gorōmaru in Yagoshima, Minami-Alps, Yamanashi Prefecture. In front of the tomb is a temple dedicated to Kannon, with a statue of Kannon Bodhisattva, which is said to protect Gosho no Gorōmaru. Locals hold an annual memorial service for Gorōmaru at the end of August.

== In popular culture ==
=== Theater ===
Gorōmaru appears in noh and kabuki in the Sogamono plays.

- Soga Moyōtateshi no Gosho-zome (曽我綉侠御所染), commonly known as Gosho no Gorozō; the protagonist Gosho no Gorozō is modeled after Gosho no Gorōmaru.
- Soga Kyōgen (曽我狂言) is a story about the Revenge of Soga Brothers in which Gosho no Gorozō is a supporting character.

=== Film ===
- Soga-kyōdai Fuji no Yashū (曽我兄弟 富士の夜襲), Toei film, Fushimi Sentarō as Gosho no Gorōmaru, Director: Yasushi Sasaki, (1956)

=== Art ===
Gosho no Gorōmaru has been the subject of several ukiyo-e paintings. The most famous include the following:

- Soga Gorō and Gosho no Gorōmaru (1794) by Sharaku
- Warriors Trembling with Courage: Soga Tokimune and Gosho no Gorōmaru (1886) by Tsukioka Yoshitoshi
- Buei Moyu Kagami by Utagawa Kuniyoshi

== Gallery ==
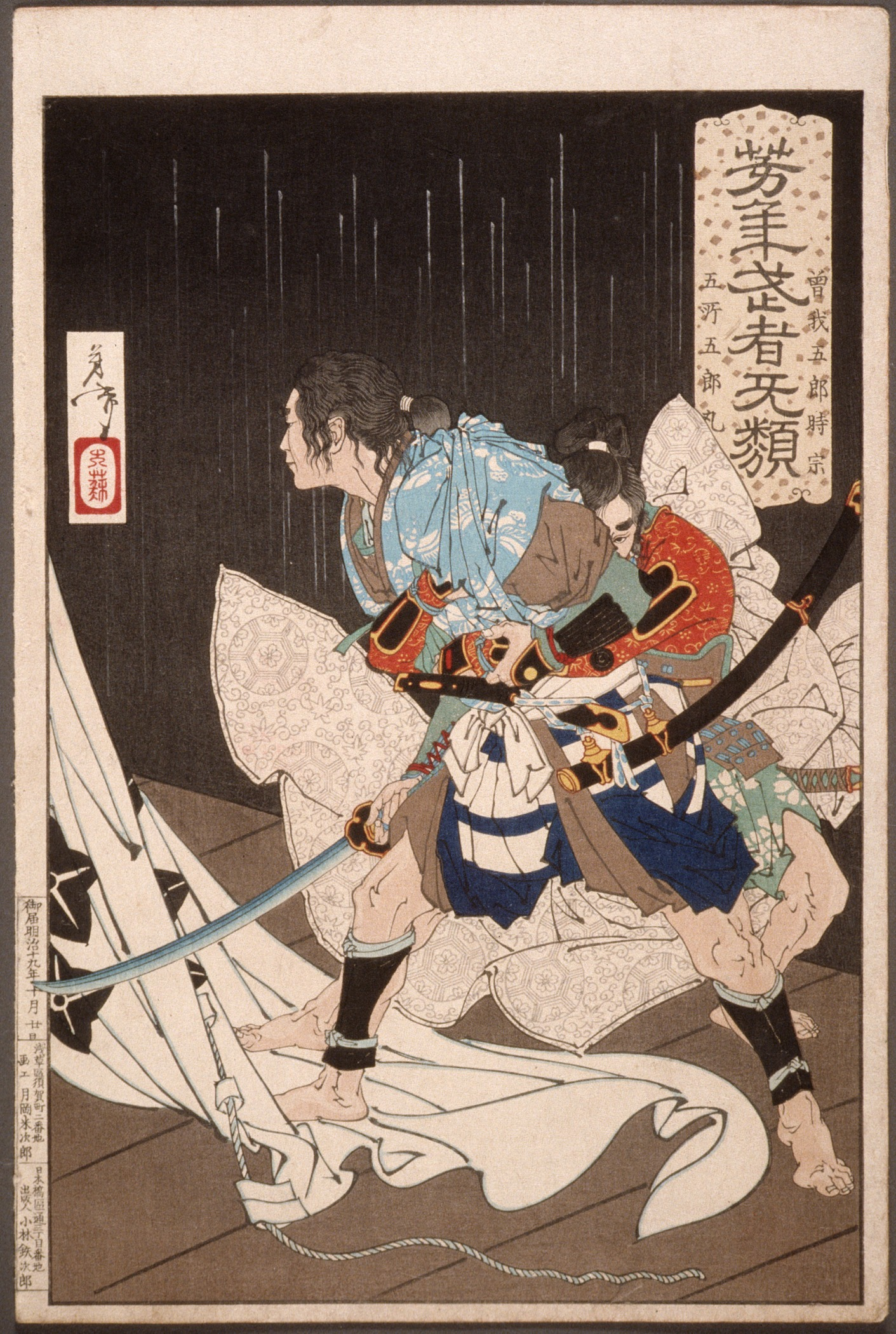
Soga Tokimune and Gosho no Gorōmaru by Tsukioka Yoshitoshi

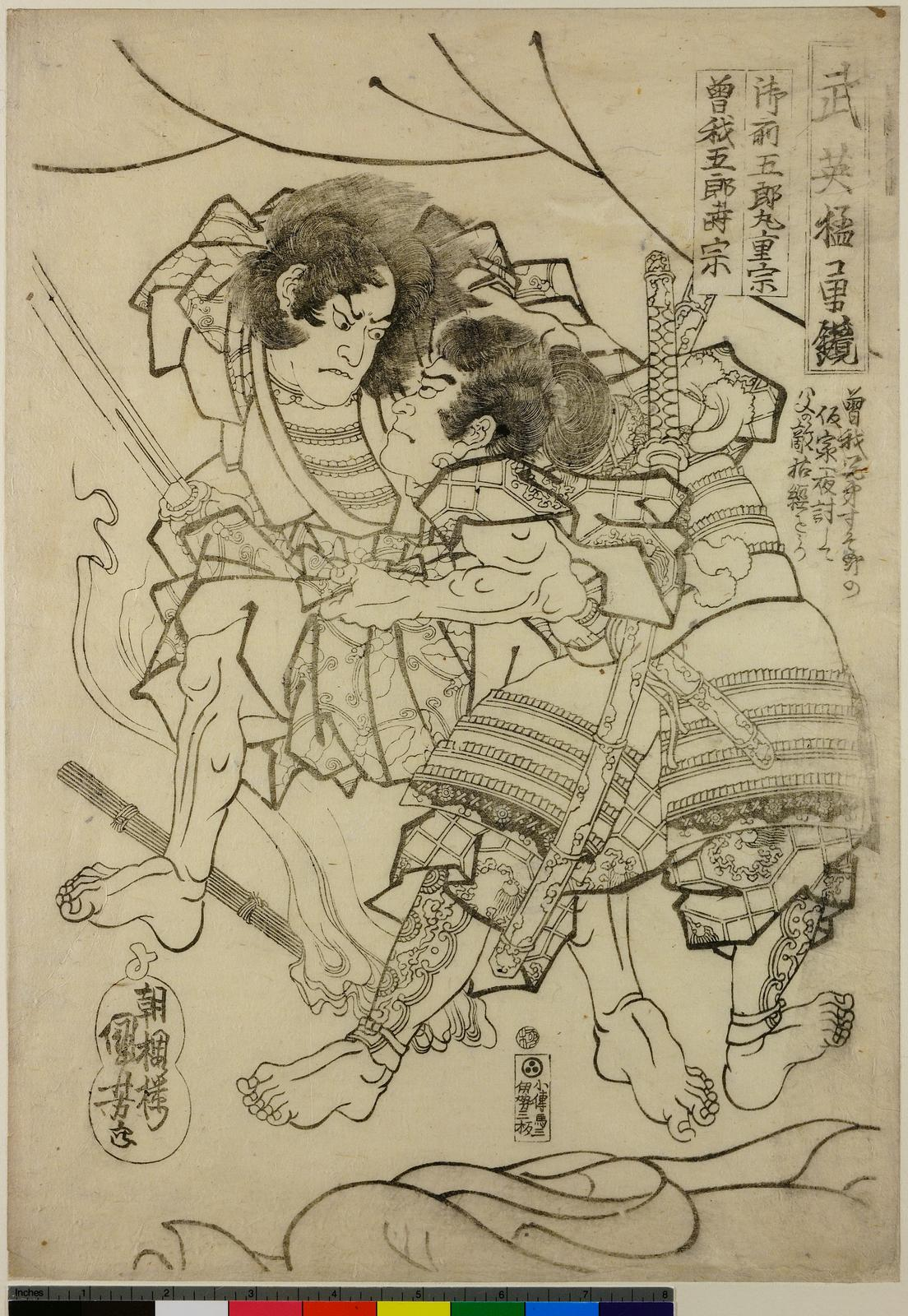
Buei Moyu Kagami by Utagawa Kuniyoshi

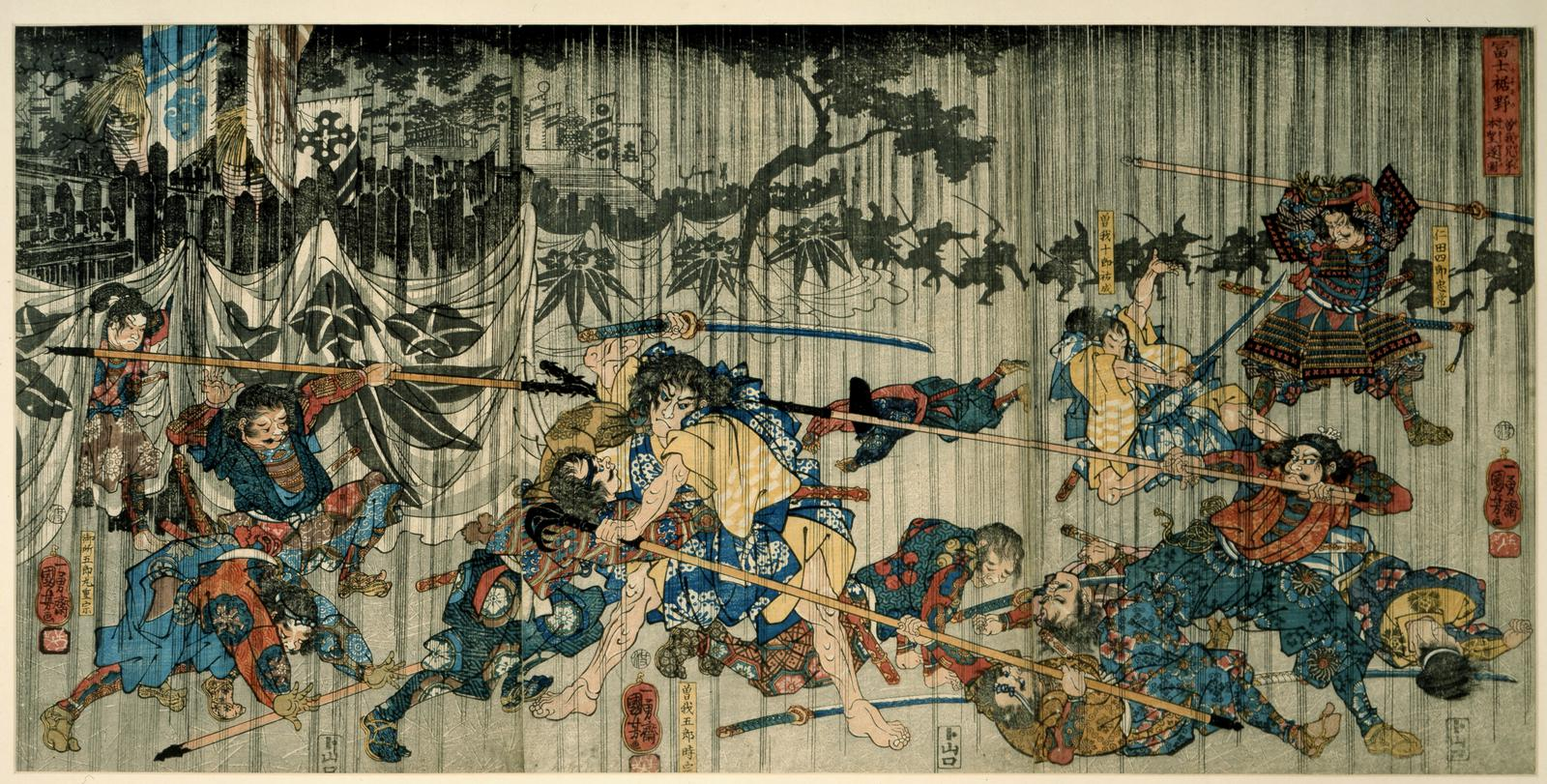
Moor at the Foot of Mt Fuji- Soga Brothers Achieving their Avowed Wish by Utagawa Kuniyoshi
