= Lobotomy Corporation =

2018 video game

- Developer: Project Moon
- Engine: Unity
- Platform: Microsoft Windows
- Release: April 9, 2018
- Genre: Management simulation

Lobotomy Corporation is a 2018 indie horror rogue-like strategy management simulation video game developed and published by South Korean studio Project Moon for Microsoft Windows. Set in a futuristic dystopia, the game follows the management and operations of the titular energy company that harvests energy from strange and dangerous entities known as "Abnormalities". The premise of Lobotomy Corporation is cited to be inspired by the SCP Foundation, Warehouse 13, and The Cabin in the Woods.

Initially a standalone game, Lobotomy Corporation has become the basis for a connected series of video games, webcomics, and web novels, including the direct sequel deck-building game Library of Ruina, and a connected installment, Limbus Company.

== Development ==
In an interview for GameSpark in 2018, Project Moon CEO Kim Jihoon explained how the development of Lobotomy Corporation began:

Development of Lobotomy Corporation began in January 2015. When I was in a club in college, I formed a development team with my friends. When I was obsessed with the SCP Foundation, I wanted to play a game where the SCP Foundation contained monsters. But no matter how hard I searched, I couldn't find a monster management game that I wanted to play. I thought that many other people would want to play it, so I started developing such a game myself.

Kim Jihoon also wrote in the interview that the development team initially consisted of four people, but grew to ten prior to release.

== Setting ==
Gameplay screenshot.

Lobotomy Corporation is set in the City, a dystopia where 26 mega-corporations known as "the Wings of the World" control the last known remaining bastion of humanity. Each corporation begins with a unique letter of the alphabet, from A Corp to Z Corp (though when looking into the City's map picture revealed in future games, the Z corp or District 26 is unseen). Lobotomy Corporation, also called L Corp, is able to produce large amounts of sustainable energy called Enkephalin by harvesting it from entities known as Abnormalities.

Abnormalities are creatures that are manifested from the human consciousness using L Corp's singularity, Cogito, which extracts abstract ideas from the human mind and materializes them into physical entities. Each Abnormality has its own archetype, which is denoted by its classification number. Some Abnormalities are based on concepts, fears, or ideas, such as The Queen of Hatred (or Magical Girl) and Mountain of Smiling Bodies. Some are tool Abnormalities that have a wide range of effects on the players employees, and others are based on fairy tales and old stories, such as Little Red Riding Hooded Mercenary or Snow White's Apple. The corporation’s task is to extract energy from them by managing them safely, though this often requires cruel and morally questionable practices.

Lobotomy Corporation is split into multiple branches and facilities, each one made up of various departments. The game takes place in the facility located under the HQ of Lobotomy Corporation.

== Gameplay ==
Lobotomy Corporation is a monster management simulator and a tactical crisis-management game. It takes place in a 2D side view cutaway. Players take on the role of Lobotomy Corporation's Manager, where the player is tasked to harvest energy ("Enkephalin") and PE-Boxes from entities known as "Abnormalities" to fulfill the daily quota. The daily quota is the end goal for each day that gets higher as the days go on, it helps progressively unlock new departments. Each department is overseen by characters known as the "Sephirot" who assign department specific missions to build up toward that specific Sephirah's core suppression, which are bosses that are required to be beat to unlock the true ending.

The game relies on punishing trial-and-error gameplay, but it offers a day restart, and a Memory Repository. Memory Repositories save every five days, and it lets the player go back five days with the player's Abnormality observation levels, completed missions, and E.G.O gear progress if the player make an irreversible failure. The game relies on the player-controlled characters called "Agents", whom the manager can assign to specific tasks, like suppressing escaped Abnormalities, or doing work on them. Agents can be hired or have their stats upgraded in the menu using Lob Points, which are given after every day, with the point amount depending on the player's end day grade and performance. Agents possess four stats that can be upgraded with Lob Points. The stats being Fortitude, Prudence, Temperance, and Justice. These stats means a specific thing, such as Fortitude being health points, Prudence being sanity (sanity dropping too low can cause an agent to panic and act erratically), Temperance being work success rate and work speed, and Justice being attack speed and movement speed.

Abnormality work contains four different types of observation (Insight, Instinct, Attachment, Repression), with each Abnormality having favored types of work. Abnormalities' risk level are measured with varying names. Aleph being the most dangerous, and Zayin the safest. Successful work with Abnormalities grants the player PE-Boxes, which not only count for the player's daily quota, but also allow the player to separately use it as a currency to purchase E.G.O gear for agents, observation details for an Abnormality, and manager tips. Unsuccessful work grants NE-Boxes, which damage the agent who was working on the Abnormality with the Abnormality's listed damage type. Damage types include red, white, black, and pale. Performing work on Abnormalities increases the Qliphoth gauge, the gauge has multiple levels that can cause ordeals once reached. Each new level on the gauge can place timers on Abnormalities, that give the player a set amount of time to work on specific Abnormalities. If work isn't completed on them in time, it causes them to breach and lower the player's current energy count. Ordeals are hostile waves of enemies categorized by difficulty with names being based off times of day. Ordeals invade the facility, and require the player to suppress them.

== Reception ==
The game was released in April 2018. In January 2023, nearly five years after launch, Project Moon reported the game had sold over 1 million copies.

In a review for Rock Paper Shotgun, Alec Meer praised the ambience and design of the game, but highlighted an excessive amount of dialogue, compounded by a poor English translation described as "awful", and concluded “Lobotomy Corporation is unnecessarily complicated and too small and repetitive, all at the same time." The English version has since been entirely retranslated.

A sequel, deck-building game Library of Ruina, was released for Windows and Xbox One in August 2021. A third installment, dungeon role-playing game Limbus Company, was released in February 2023.
