= Yoshihide =

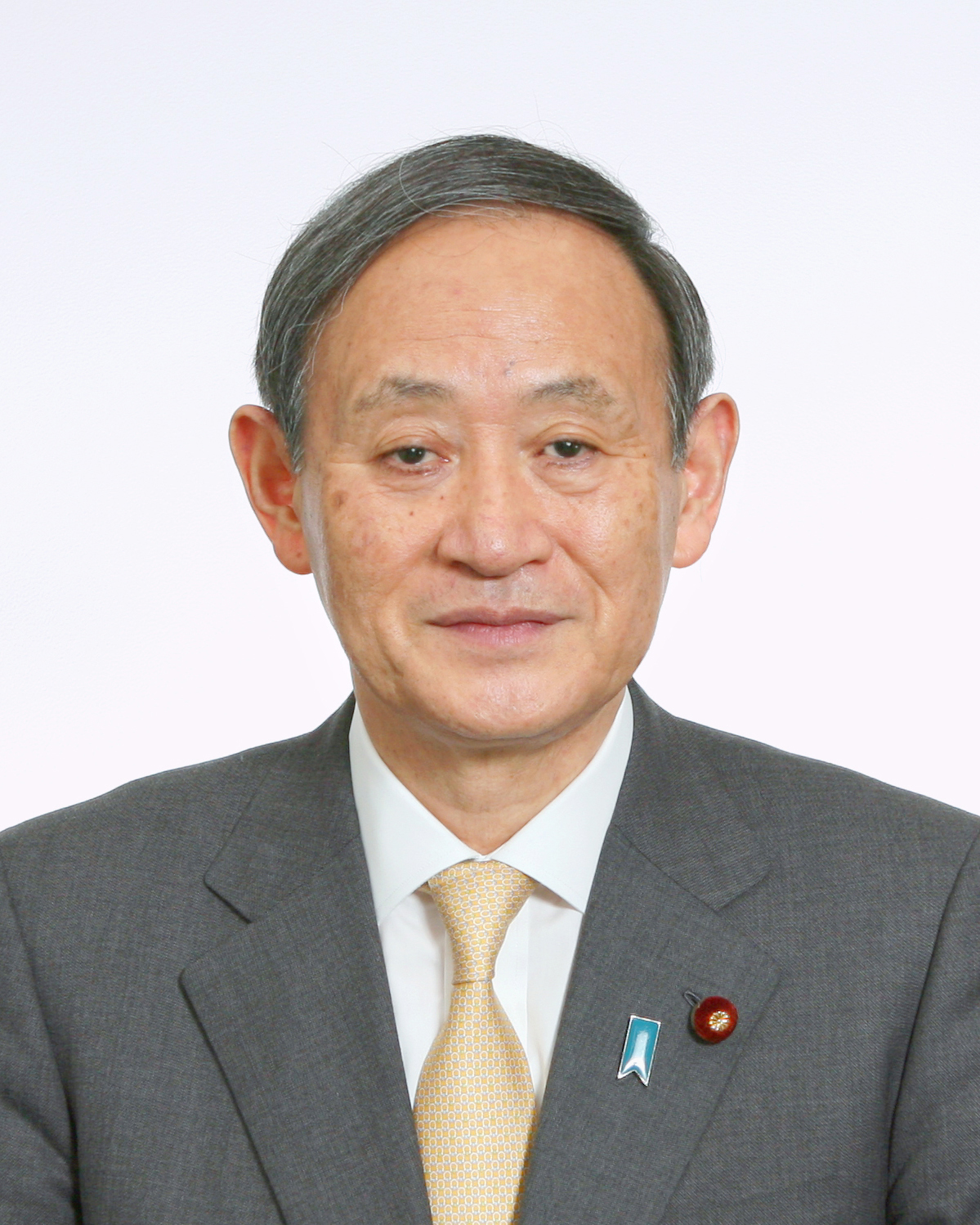
- Yoshihide Suga, Japanese politician
- Pronunciation: joɕiçide (IPA)
- Gender: Male

Origin
- Origin: Japanese
- Meaning: Different meanings depending on the kanji used

Other names
- Alternative spelling: Yosihide (Kunrei-shiki) Yosihide (Nihon-shiki) Yoshihide (Hepburn)

Yoshihide is a masculine Japanese given name.

== Written forms ==
Yoshihide can be written using many different combinations of kanji characters. Here are some examples:

- 義英, "justice, hero"
- 義秀, "justice, excellence"
- 義日出, "justice, sunrise"
- 吉英, "good luck, hero"
- 吉秀, "good luck, excellence"
- 吉日出, "good luck, sunrise"
- 善英, "virtuous, hero"
- 善秀, "virtuous, excellence"
- 芳英, "virtuous/fragrant, hero"
- 芳秀, "virtuous/fragrant, excellence"
- 良英, "good, hero"
- 良秀, "good, excellence"
- 慶秀, "congratulate, excellence"
- 由秀, "reason, excellence"
- 与志英, "give, determination, hero"
- 嘉英, "excellent, hero"
- 嘉日出, "excellent, elegant boy"

The name can also be written in hiragana よしひで or katakana ヨシヒデ.

== Notable people with the name ==
- Yoshihide Asahina (朝比奈 義秀), Japanese samurai
- Yoshihide Ashikaga (足利 義栄; 1538–1568), Japanese shōgun
- Yoshihide Fujiwara (藤原 芳秀; born 1966), Japanese manga artist
- Yoshihide Fukao (深尾 吉英; born 1949), Japanese volleyball player
- Yoshihide Fukutome (福留 義秀; born 1933), Japanese modern pentathlete
- Yoshihide Hayashi (林 義秀; 1891–1978), Japanese general
- Yoshihide Kiryu (桐生 祥秀; born 1995), Japanese sprinter
- Yoshihide Muroya (室屋 義秀; born 1973), Japanese aviator
- Yoshihide Nagano (永野 義秀; born 1969), Japanese fencer
- Yoshihide Nishikawa (西川 吉英; born 1978), Japanese footballer
- Yoshihide Otomo (大友 良英; born 1959), Japanese composer and musician
- Yoshihide Sasaki (佐々木 喜英; born 1987), Japanese actor
- Yoshihide Suga (菅 義偉; born 1948), Japanese politician and Prime Minister of Japan

== See also ==
- 7408 Yoshihide, a main-belt asteroid
- Yoshi
