= Prince Hisaaki =

Military ruler of Japan from 1289 to 1308

Prince Hisaaki 久明親王

Shōgun
- In office: 24 October 1289 – 20 August 1308
- Predecessor: Prince Koreyasu
- Successor: Prince Morikuni
- Monarch: Fushimi; Go-Fushimi; Go-Nijō
- Shikken: Hōjō Sadatoki; Hōjō Morotoki
- Born: 19 October 1276; Heian-kyō, Japan
- Died: 16 November 1328 (aged 52); Heian-kyō, Japan
- Spouses: daughter of Prince Koreyasu daughter of Reizei Tamesuke
- Issue: Prince Morikuni; Prince Hisanaga; Prince Hisaaki; Shōe
- Father: Emperor Go-Fukakusa
- Mother: Sanjō Fusako
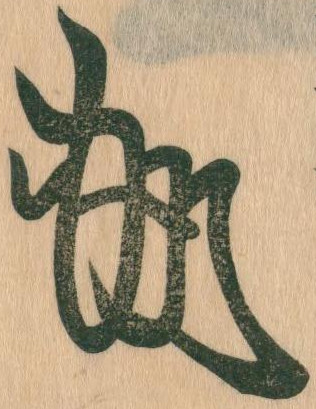
- Signature

Prince Hisaaki (久明親王, Hisaaki Shinnō; 19 October 1276 – 16 November 1328; r. 1289–1308), also known as Prince Hisaakira, was the 8th shōgun of the Kamakura shogunate of Japan.

He became shōgun shortly after his thirteenth birthday following the deposition of his predecessor and cousin Prince Koreyasu and was the nominal ruler controlled by Hōjō clan regents. He was the father of his successor, Prince Morikuni.

Prince Hisaaki was the son of Emperor Go-Fukakusa and the younger half-brother of Emperor Fushimi.

== Family ==
- Father: Emperor Go-Fukakusa
- Mother: Fujiwara no Fusako
- Adopted Father: Prince Koreyasu
- Wife: daughter of Prince Koreyasu (d. 1306)
- Concubine: Reizei no Tsubone
- Children:
  - Prince Morikuni by daughter of Prince Koreyasu
  - Prince Hisayoshi (1310–1347) by Reizei no Tsubone
  - Prince Hiroaki (d. 1348)
  - Prince Kiyozumi

== Eras of Hisaaki's bakufu ==
The years in which Hisaaki is shogun are more specifically identified by more than one era name or nengō.

- Shōō (1288–1293)
- Einin (1293–1299)
- Shōan (1299–1302)
- Kengen (1302–1303)
- Kagen (1303–1306)
- Tokuji (1306–1308)
- Enkyō (1308–1311)

== Notes ==
| Preceded by Prince Koreyasu | Shōgun: Prince Hisaaki; 1289–1308 | Succeeded by Prince Morikuni |
