= 1308 =

1308 in various calendars
- Gregorian calendar: 1308; MCCCVIII
- Ab urbe condita: 2061
- Armenian calendar: 757; ԹՎ ՉԾԷ
- Assyrian calendar: 6058
- Balinese saka calendar: 1229–1230
- Bengali calendar: 714–715
- Berber calendar: 2258
- English Regnal year: 1 Edw. 2 – 2 Edw. 2
- Buddhist calendar: 1852
- Burmese calendar: 670
- Byzantine calendar: 6816–6817
- Chinese calendar: 丁未年 (Fire Goat); 4005 or 3798 — to — 戊申年 (Earth Monkey); 4006 or 3799
- Coptic calendar: 1024–1025
- Discordian calendar: 2474
- Ethiopian calendar: 1300–1301
- Hebrew calendar: 5068–5069
- Hindu calendars
- Vikram Samvat: 1364–1365
- Shaka Samvat: 1229–1230
- Kali Yuga: 4408–4409
- Holocene calendar: 11308
- Igbo calendar: 308–309
- Iranian calendar: 686–687
- Islamic calendar: 707–708
- Japanese calendar: Tokuji 3 / Enkyō 1 (延慶元年)
- Javanese calendar: 1219–1220
- Julian calendar: 1308; MCCCVIII
- Korean calendar: 3641
- Minguo calendar: 604 before ROC 民前604年
- Nanakshahi calendar: −160
- Thai solar calendar: 1850–1851
- Tibetan calendar: མེ་མོ་ལུག་ལོ་ (female Fire-Sheep); 1434 or 1053 or 281 — to — ས་ཕོ་སྤྲེ་ལོ་ (male Earth-Monkey); 1435 or 1054 or 282

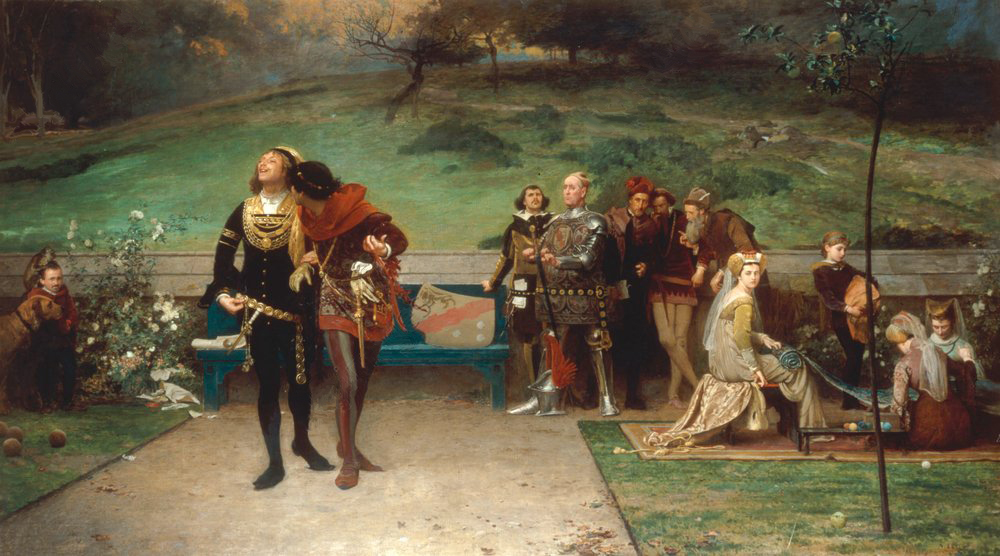
Edward II cavorting with his favourite Piers Gaveston (left) by Marcus Stone

Year 1308 (MCCCVIII) was a leap year starting on Monday of the Julian calendar.

== Events ==
=== January – March ===
- January 25 – King Edward II marries the 13-year-old Isabella of France, daughter of King Philip IV of France ("Philip the Fair"). The marriage takes place at Boulogne and Edward leaves his friend and favourite, Piers Gaveston, as regent in his absence. Isabella's wardrobe indicates her wealth and style – she has dresses of silk, velvet, taffeta and cloth along with numerous furs; she has over 72 headdresses and coifs. Isabella brings with her two gold crowns, gold and silver dinnerware and 419 yards of linen. Meanwhile, Edward alienates the nobles by placing Gaveston in such a powerful position, who react by signing the Boulogne agreement on January 31.
- February 1 – Herman I the Tall Margrave of Brandenburg-Salzwedel (and co-ruler of Brandenburg with Otto IV), dies and is succeeded as Margrave by his son John V.
- February 25 – Edward II is crowned at Westminster Abbey under the guidance of Henry Woodlock, bishop of Winchester. During the ceremony, Piers Gaveston is given the honour of carrying the crown. At the banquet that followed, Edward spends more time with Gaveston than with his wife Isabella of France. Isabella's family, who have travelled with her from France, leave to report back to Philip IV of Edward's favouritism for Gaveston over Isabella. As part of the coronation, Edward swears an oath to uphold "the rightful laws and customs which the community of the realm shall have chosen".
- March 8 – King Denis of Portugal, "the Poet King", grants Póvoa de Varzim a charter, the Foral, giving royal lands to 54 families, who found a municipality known as Póvoa around Praça Velha.
- March 18 – Brothers Andrei Rurik and Lev II Rurik become the co-monarchs of Ruthenia (now part of Ukraine and Poland, with a capital at Lviv), upon the death of their father, King Yuri I of Galicia. The two brothers will reign until their deaths in 1323 at the Battle of Berestia against Mongol invaders.

=== April – June ===
- April 15 – Abu Hammu I becomes the new ruler of the Kingdom of Tlemcen after the death of his brother, Sultan Abu Zayyan I.
- May 1 – King Albrecht I of Germany, ruler of the Regnum Teutonicorum and King of the Romans within the Holy Roman Empire, is assassinated at Windisch in Switzerland by his nephew, John of Swabia, the day after the two had an argument at a banquet in Winterthur.
- May 23 – Battle of Inverurie: Scottish forces led by King Robert the Bruce defeat the rival Scots under John Comyn at Oldmeldrum. During the battle, Robert repulses a surprise attack on his camp, and counter-attacks the Scots of Clan Comyn. John flees to seek refuge at the English court and is well received by Edward II, who appoints him as Lord Warden of the Marches. Meanwhile, Robert orders his forces to burn the farms, houses and strongholds associated with Clan Cumming in north-east Scotland. The Earldom of Buchan will never again rise for Clan Cumming.
- June 25 – Piers Gaveston is exiled for the second time by the Parliament, due to possible corruption and exploited personal gains. As compensation for the loss of the Earldom of Cornwall, which is another condition of his exile, Gaveston is granted land worth 3,000 marks annually in Gascony. Further to this, he is appointed Lord Lieutenant of Ireland – so that a certain amount of honour can be maintained despite the humiliation of the exile. Gaveston is also threatened with ex-communication by Pope Clement V. Edward II accompanies him to Bristol, from where he sets sail for Ireland.
- June 28 – After 138 members of the Knights Templar were convicted of heresy on October 19, 1307, a trial is held for 54 Templars who testify before Pope Clement V, with most confessing to at least one charge.

=== July – September ===
- July 2 – Alauddin Khalji, Sultan of Delhi sets off from the Indian city of Delhi toward the Fort of Siwana (now in the Rajasthan state) to begin the siege of Siwana, which is completed in September.
- July 28 – Abu Thabit 'Amir dies and is succeeded by his brother Abu al-Rabi Sulayman as ruler of the Marinid Sultanate.
- July 30 – Chungseon of Goryeo becomes the King of Korea for the second time, after the death of his father, King Chungnyeol of Korea. Chungseon had ruled for a few months in 1298 during the illness of his father.
- August 11 – Pope Clement V grants the Knights Hospitaller permission to begin the Crusade of the Poor.
- August 12 – Pope Clement V publishes the papal bull Faciens Misericordiam ("The granting of forgiveness"), absolving the Knights Templar from charges of heresy and declaring that the Roman Catholic Church, rather than any individual nation, will be in charge of future charges against the Knights. On the same day, he issues the bull Regnans in coelis, summoning what will become the Council of Vienne in 1311.
- August 14 – King Ananta Malla of Nepal dies after a reign of 34 years, leaving the Himalayan Mountains kingdom without a monarch for five years.
- August 15 – The Knights Hospitaller complete the conquest of the Greek island of Rhodes after four years.
- August 20 – The Chinon Parchment is written by French Cardinal Berengar Fredol the Elder, summarizing the results of the investigations of Fredol and the two other Cardinals of their disposition of the Knights Templar charges. The parchment is then put in the Vatican Apostolic Archive and will remain undiscovered for almost seven centuries before being rediscovered by Barbara Frale.
- August 31 – (Tokuji 3, 15th day of the 8th month of Tokuji 3) Prince Morikuni becomes the ninth, and last, shogun of the Kamakura bakufu.
- September 10 – (Tokuji 3, 25th day of the 8th month) At the age of 11, Hanazono becomes the 95th Emperor of Japan upon the death of his cousin, the Emperor Go-Nijō. Emperor Hanazono will rule until 1348.
- September – Siege of Siwana: Delhi forces under Alauddin Khalji capture the Siwana fortress after a two-month siege. During the siege, Alauddin defiles the main water tank of Siwana (by a traitor) with cows' blood.

=== October – December ===
- October 5 – Guy II de la Roche, Duchy of Athens, dies at the age of 28, bringing an end to the de la Roche dynasty. He is succeeded by his cousin, Walter V, Count of Brienne.
- October 20 – The English Parliament begins its fourth session of the reign of King Edward II and meets at Westminster.
- November 10 – After the fall of the fortress of Siwana in India, Prince Sital Deva is ambushed while trying to flee to safety at Jalor. The soldiers decapitate Sital and present his head as a trophy to the Delhi Sultan, Alauddin.
- November 13 – The Teutonic Knights capture Gdańsk by treachery – while a Brandenburger force of 100 knights and 200 followers led by Heinrich von Plötzke and Günther von Schwarzburg lay siege to the city. The garrison of Gdańsk castle is too weak to defend itself against the Brandenburgers. Meanwhile, the Polish ruler of Gdańsk Pomerania, Władysław I Łokietek ("Wladyslaw the Elbow-High"), is unable to send reinforcements. The citizens call upon the Teutonic Knights for military help and offer to pay their costs. The arrival of the knights, lead the Brandenburgers to beat a hasty retreat. In an act of supreme treachery, the Teutonic Knights attack the city they have come to save. The houses of both Polish and German are burnt and destroyed. Many people are slaughtered without mercy, including women and children who have sought sanctuary in churches. Within a year, the German Crusaders occupy the whole of Eastern Pomerania and consolidate their power at the Baltic Sea.
- November 22 – The coronation of the Emperor Hanazono of Japan takes place at Edo.
- November 27
  - Henry VII Count of Luxemburg, is elected the new Holy Roman Emperor at Frankfurt. The election comes with the support of his brother Baldwin, Archbishop of Trier, who wins over most of the electors, in exchange for some substantial concessions. The only elector who does not support Henry of Luxemburg is Henry of Bohemia.
  - On the same day, Hungarian nobles formally elect the 20-year-old Charles Robert of Salerno as King of Hungary and Croatia in the Hungarian city of Pest (now part of Budapest). He becomes Charles I, but his rule remains nominal in most parts of the realm after he is crowned.
- December 16 – Tran Anh Tong becomes the new Emperor of Dai Viet (corresponding to northern Vietnam) upon the death of his father, Tran Nhan Tong.
- December 19 – Treaty of Alcalá de Henares: King Ferdinand IV of Castile and King James II of Aragon sign an alliance in the Monastery of Santa María de Huerta. Ferdinand agrees to join James in making war by sea and by land against Granada. He also promises to give up one-sixth of Granada to Aragon, and grants him the Province of Almería.
- December – King Władysław I Łokietek of Poland imprisons Jan Muskata, Bishop of Kraków. In response, Polish and German citizens revolt against his rule in Kraków (as in all Poland's cities at this time). Władysław in a delicate position responds with force and arrests the revolt's leaders. He ties them to horses and drags them through the city streets.

=== By place ===
==== Europe ====
- Sultan Mesud II, Seljuk vassal of the Mongol Ilkhanate, is murdered after a 5-year reign. During his rule, he exercises no real authority and becomes the last ruler. Ending the Sultanate of Rum after 230 years.
- King Philip IV of France purchases Hôtel de Nesle in Paris and builds one of the earliest indoor tennis courts there.

==== Scotland ====
- Summer – Battle of the Pass of Brander: Scottish forces under King Robert the Bruce defeat the rival Scots of the Clan MacDougall, kinsmen of John Comyn the Red . During the battle, Robert orders to bypass the Pass of Brander. He sends James Douglas the Black) with a party of archers to take up positions above the pass to avoid an ambush. Robert breaks through the MacDougalls blockade and defeats them at the Bridge of Awe. The MacDougalls are chased westwards across the River Awe to Dunstaffnage. The Lord of Argyll surrenders and does homage to Robert.
- The harrying of Buchan takes places as Scottish forces under Edward Bruce devastate the lands of John Comyn, and his supporters following the victory at Inverurie. Meanwhile, Robert the Bruce takes Aberdeen, conquers Galloway and threatens northern Scotland.

==== Asia ====
- Summer – Delhi forces led by Malik Kafur invade the Yadava Kingdom under King Ramachandra, who shelters the fugitive Vaghela king Karna. Ramachandra sues for peace and acknowledges Delhi's overlordship.

=== By topic ===
==== Literature ====
- Dante Alighieri begins work on his Divine Comedy, comprising Inferno, Purgatorio and Paradiso. It is one of the most influential works of the European Middle Ages (approximate date).

== Births ==
- August 12 – Moriyoshi, Japanese nobleman and prince (d. 1335)
- Andrea Orcagna, Italian painter, sculptor and architect (d. 1368)
- Gaston II, French nobleman and knight (House of Foix) (d. 1343)
- Joan III of Burgundy, French noblewoman and princess (d. 1347)
- Joguk (or "Borjigin Jintong"), queen consort of Goryeo (d. 1325)
- Longchenpa, Tibetan Buddhist scholar-yogi and writer (d. 1364)

== Deaths ==
- January 30 – Margaret of Tyre, Outremer noblewoman (b. 1244)
- February 1 – Herman the Tall, German nobleman (b. 1275)
- March 18 – Yuri I of Galicia, king of Ruthenia (House of Rurik)
- April 5
  - Ivan Kőszegi, Hungarian nobleman and palatine (b. 1245)
  - Reginald de Grey, English nobleman and knight (b. 1240)
- May 1 – Albert I, German nobleman, pretender and king (b. 1255)
- May 22 – Amadeus II, Burgundian nobleman (House of Geneva)
- July 4 – Eberhard I, German nobleman (House of La Marck)
- July 28 – Abu Thabit 'Amir, Marinid ruler of Morocco (b. 1284)
- July 30 – Chungnyeol, Korean ruler (House of Wang) (b. 1236)
- August 12 – Edmund Stafford, English nobleman and Peerage
- August 18 – Clare of Montefalco, Italian nun and abbess (b. 1268)
- September 4 – Margaret of Burgundy, queen of Sicily (b. 1250)
- September 10 – Go-Nijō, Japanese emperor (b. 1285)
- October 5 – Guy II, Latin nobleman (House de la Roche) (b. 1280)
- October 10 – Patrick IV de Dunbar, Scottish nobleman (b. 1242)
- November 8 – John Duns Scotus, Scottish priest and philosopher
- December 16 – Tran Nhan Tong, Vietnamese emperor (b. 1258)
- December 21 – Henry I, Landgrave of Hesse (Henry the Child), German nobleman (b. 1244)
