= Prince Morikuni =

Military ruler of Japan from 1308 to 1333

Prince Morikuni 守邦親王

Shōgun
- In office: 26 August 1308 – 4 July 1333
- Predecessor: Prince Hisaaki
- Successor: Prince Moriyoshi
- Monarch: Go-Nijō; Hanazono; Go-Daigo
- Shikken: Hōjō Morotoki; Hōjō Munenobu; Hōjō Hirotoki; Hōjō Mototoki; Hōjō Takatoki; Hōjō Sadaaki; Hōjō Moritoki
- Born: 19 June 1301; Kamakura, Japan
- Died: 25 September 1333 (aged 32); Kamakura, Japan
- Father: Prince Hisaaki
- Mother: daughter of Prince Koreyasu
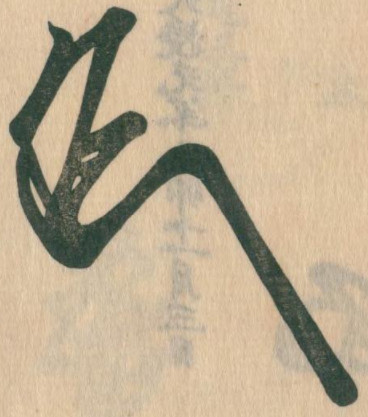
- Signature

Prince Morikuni (守邦親王, Morikuni Shinnō; 19 June 1301 – 25 September 1333; r. 1308–1333) was the ninth and last shōgun of the Kamakura shogunate of Japan.

He was a son of the eighth shōgun Prince Hisaaki and was a grandson of the Emperor Go-Fukakusa. He was also a puppet ruler controlled by Hōjō Takatoki, who was the Kamakura shogunate's shikken or chief minister and tokusō of Hōjō clan (de facto ruler of Japan). His mother was daughter of Prince Koreyasu who died in 1306.

After the collapse of the Kamakura bakufu, he became a Buddhist priest. He died shortly afterwards.

The Kamakura shogunate was succeeded by the short-lived Kenmu Restoration.

== Eras of Morikuni's bakufu ==
The years in which Morikuni was shōgun are more specifically identified by more than one era name or nengō.

Pre-Nanboku-chō court

- Enkyō (1308–1311)
- Ōchō (1311–1312)
- Shōwa (1312–1317)
- Bunpō (1317–1319)
- Gen'ō (1319–1321)
- Genkō (1321–1324)
- Shōchū (1324–1326)
- Karyaku (1326–1329)
- Gentoku (1329–1331)
- Genkō (1331–1334)

Nanboku-chō southern court

- Eras as reckoned by legitimate Court (as determined by Meiji rescript)

Nanboku-chō northern Court

- Eras as reckoned by pretender Court (as determined by Meiji rescript)
  - Shōkei (1332–1338)

== Notes ==
Preceded by Prince Hisaaki	Shōgun: Prince Morikuni; 1308–1333	Kenmu Restoration
