= Saionji Shōshi =

Saionji Shōshi 西園寺鏱子

Empress consort of Japan
- Tenure: 27 November 1288 – 27 September 1298
- Born: 1271
- Died: 10 June 1342 (aged 70–71); Heian-kyō (Kyōto)
- Spouse: Emperor Fushimi
- Issue: Emperor Go-Fushimi (adopted)
- House: Imperial House of Japan
- Father: Saionji Sanekane
- Mother: Nakanoin Akiko

Saionji Shōshi (西園寺しょう子, 西園寺鏱子; 1271 – 10 June 1342), also known as Eifuku Mon'in (永福門院) (also written Eifuku-mon In), was a celebrated Japanese poet of the Kamakura period, and a consort of the 92nd emperor, Fushimi. Her father was the Chancellor Sane-kane. She was a member of the Kyōgoku school of verse (京極派, Kyōgoku-ha), and her work appears in the Gyokuyōshū.

She became empress in 1288, and though she had no children of her own, she adopted Go-Fushimi. In 1298, her husband abdicated the throne. On 23 June 1316 (5th year of Shōwa), she took tonsure as a Buddhist nun and was given the Dharma name Shin'nyo Gen (真如源).

Japanese royalty
Preceded by Princess Reishi	Empress consort of Japan; 1288–1298	Succeeded by Fujiwara no Kinshi
