= Ōchō =

Period of Japanese history (1311–1312 CE)

Ōchō 応長
- April 1311 – February 1312
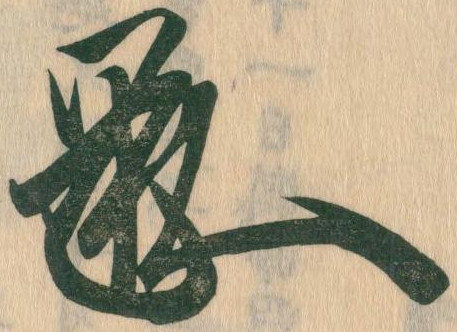
- Kaō (signature) of Emperor Hanazono
- Location: Japan
- Monarch(s): Emperor Hanazono

Ōchō (応長) was a Japanese era name (年号, nengō, "year name") after Enkyō and before Shōwa. This period spanned 11 months from April 1311 through February 1312. The reigning emperor was Hanazono-tennō (花園天皇).

== Change of era ==
- 1311 Ōchō gannen (応長元年): The new era name was created to mark an event or series of events. The previous era ended and the new one commenced in Enkyō 4. The era name is derived from the Old Book of Tang (10th century AD) and combines the characters 応 ("balanced, fitting, suitable") and 長 ("growing, increasing").

== Events of the Ōchō era ==
Initially, former-Emperor Fushimi administered the court up through the time he took the tonsure as a Buddhist monk, which happened after this nengō ended.

- 1311 (Ōchō 1, 1st month): The sesshō, Takatsukasa Fuyuhira assisted at Emperor Hanazono's coming of age ceremony.
- 1311 (Ōchō 1, 3rd month): Takatsukasa Fuyuhira took on a new role as kampaku.
- 1311 (Ōchō 1, 9th month): Hōjō Morotoki, who was the tenth shikken of the Kamakura Bakufu, dies at the age of 37 years.

== Notes ==
Preceded by Enkyō	Era of Japan; Ōchō; 1311–1312	Succeeded by Shōwa (正和)
