= Enkyō (Kamakura period) =

Period of Japanese history (1308–1311 CE)

Enkyō 延慶
- October 1308 – April 1311
Tokuji	Ōchō
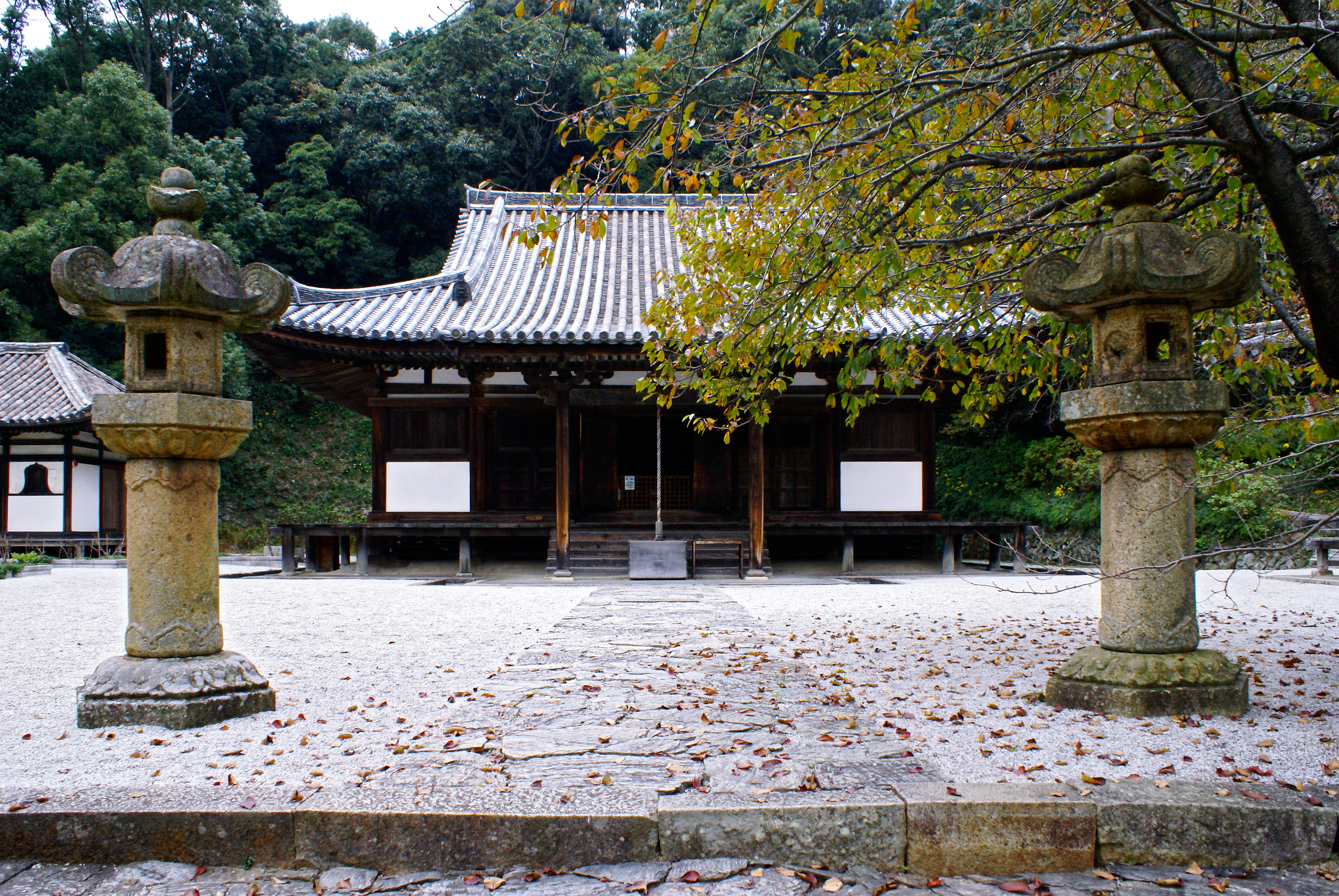
- The Main Hall of Chōhō-ji was rebuilt in 1311.
- Location: Japan
- Monarch: Emperor Hanazono

Enkyō (延慶), also romanized as Enkei, was a Japanese era name (年号, nengō; lit. "year name") after Tokuji and before Ōchō. This period spanned the years from October 1308 through April 1311. The reigning emperor was Hanazono-tennō (花園天皇).

== Change of era ==
- 1308, also called Enkyō gannen (延慶元年): The new era name was created to mark the accession of Emperor Hanazono. The previous era ended and the new one commenced in Tokuji 3. The era name is derived from the Book of the Later Han (5th century AD) and combines the characters 延 ("extend, lengthen") and 慶 ("jubilation"). It should not be confused with the later Enkyō era of 1744–48, which used a different second character (延, "enjoy").

== Events of the Enkyō era ==
Initially, former-Emperor Fushimi administered the court up through the time he took the tonsure as a Buddhist monk, which happened after this nengō ended.

- 1308 (Enkyō 1): At the death of Emperor Go-Nijō, Hanazono accedes to the Chrysanthemum Throne at age 12 years; and Takaharu-shinnō, the second son of former-Emperor Go-Uda is elevated as the heir apparent under the direction of the Kamakura shogunate.
- 1308 (Enkyō 1, 10th month): Kujō Moronori resigns his position as sesshō; and he is replaced in that role by Takatsukasa Fuyuhira.
- 1309 (Enkyō 2, 2nd month): Konoe Iehira is elevated to the position of sadaijin.
- 1310 (Enkyō 3, 11th month): The Rokuhara Tandai in Kyoto, Hōjō Sadafusa, died and Hōjō Tokiatsu was named to take his place as Kyoto representative of the military government in Kamakura.

== Notes ==
Preceded by Tokuji	Era or nengō Enkyō; 1308–1311	Succeeded by Ōchō
