= Emperor Go-Uda =

Emperor of Japan from 1274 to 1287

Emperor Go-Uda 後宇多天皇
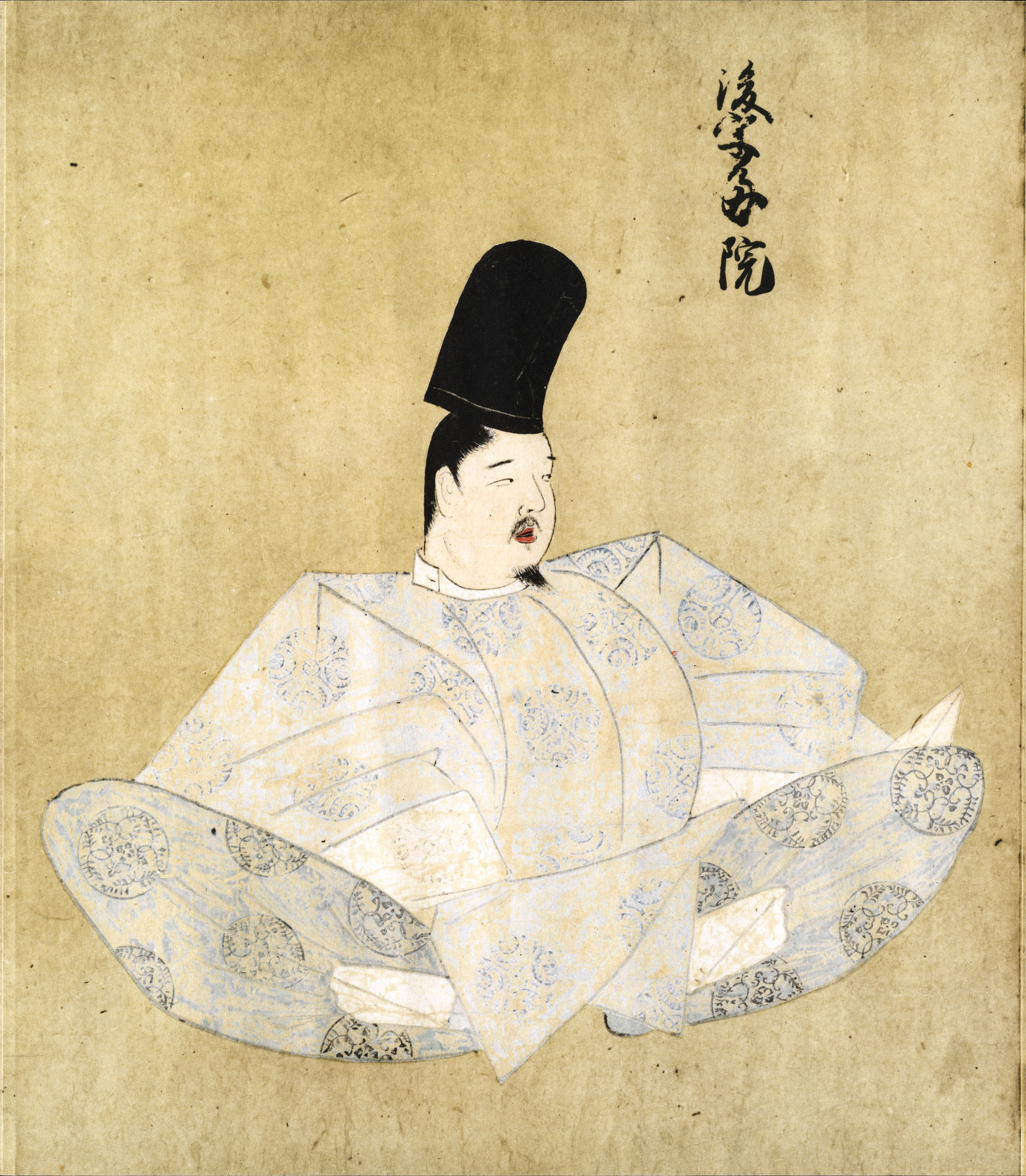
- Portrait from the Tenshi Sekkan Miei

Emperor of Japan
- Reign: 6 March 1274 – 27 November 1287
- Enthronement: 4 May 1274
- Predecessor: Kameyama
- Successor: Fushimi
- Shōgun: Prince Koreyasu
- Born: 17 December 1267; Mansion of Tsuchimikado-dono (土御門殿), Heian kyō
- Died: 16 July 1324 (aged 56); Buddhist temple of Daikaku-ji (大覚寺), Heian kyō
- Burial: Rengebu-ji no Misasagi (蓮華峯寺陵) (Kyoto)
- Spouse: Reishi (m. 1285; died 1307)
- Issue among others...: Emperor Go-Nijō; Princess Shōshi; Emperor Go-Daigo
Posthumous name
- Tsuigō: Emperor Go-Uda (後宇多院 or 後宇多天皇)
- House: Imperial House of Japan
- Father: Emperor Kameyama
- Mother: Fujiwara no Saneko
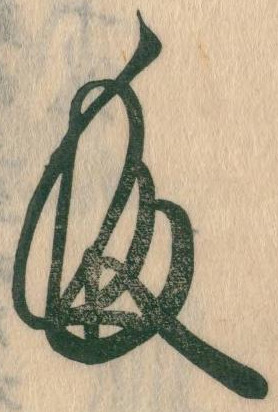
- Signature

Emperor Go-Uda (後宇多天皇, Go-Uda-tennō; 17 December 1267 – 16 July 1324) was the 91st emperor of Japan, according to the traditional order of succession. His reign spanned the years from 1274 through 1287.

This 13th-century sovereign was named after the 9th-century Emperor Uda and go- (後), translates literally as "later"; and thus, he is sometimes called the "Later Emperor Uda," or in some older sources, may be identified as "Emperor Uda, the second" or as "Emperor Uda II."

== Genealogy ==
Before his ascension to the Chrysanthemum Throne, his personal name (imina) was Yohito (世仁).

He was the second son of Emperor Kameyama. They were from the Daikaku-ji line.

- Consort: Imperial Princess Reishi (姈子内親王; 1270–1307) later Yūgimon'in (遊義門院), Emperor Go-Fukakusa's daughter
- Consort: Horikawa (Minamoto) Motoko (堀河（源）基子) later Nishika'mon-in (西華門院; 1269–1355), Horikawa Tomomori's daughter
  - First son: Imperial Prince Kuniharu (邦治親王) later Emperor Go-Nijō
- Lady-in-waiting: Itsutsuji (Fujiwara) Chushi (五辻（藤原）忠子; 1268–1319) later Dantenmon'in (談天門院), Itsutsuji Tadatsugu's daughter
  - First daughter: Imperial Princess Shōshi (1286–1348) (奨子内親王) later Tatchimon-in (達智門院)
  - Second son: Imperial Prince Takaharu (尊治親王) later Emperor Go-Daigo
  - Third son: Imperial Prince Priest Shōen (性円法親王; 1292–1347)
  - Fourth son: Imperial Prince Priest Shokaku (承覚法親王; b. 1294)
- Consort: Princess Mizuko (瑞子女王) later Eikamon'in (永嘉門院; 1272–1329), Prince Munetaka's daughter
- Consort: Ichijo-no-Tsubone（一条局）, Hashimoto Sanetoshi's daughter
  - Fifth Son: Imperial Prince Priest Shosi (性勝法親王; d. 1354)
- Consort: Princess Rinshi (掄子女王), Prince Munetaka's daughter
  - Second daughter: Imperial Princess Baishi (禖子内親王) later Sūmeimon-in (崇明門院), married Imperial Prince Kuniyoshi
- Consort: Itsutsuji Munechika's daughter
  - Third daughter: Imperial Princess Tōshi/Chūshi (愉子内親王)
- Consort: Kazan'in Nagamasa’s daughter
  - Princess
- Consort: Shinsanmi-no-tsubone (新三位局)
  - Prince (b. 1307)

== Events of Go-Uda's life ==
Yohito-shinnō became crown prince in 1268. According to the terms of the late emperor's will (Go-Saga died in 1272), in 1274, he would become emperor upon the death or abdication of Emperor Kameyama.

- 6 March 1274 (Bun'ei 11, 26th day of the 1st month): In the 15th year of Kameyama-tennō's reign (亀山天皇十五年), the emperor abdicated; and the succession (senso) was received by his cousin.
- 4 May 1274 (Bun'ei 11, 26th day of the 3rd month): Emperor Go-Uda is said to have acceded to the throne (sokui).

The retired Emperor Kameyama continued to exercise power as cloistered emperor.

During his reign, the unsuccessful Mongol invasions of Japan occurred, first in 1274 and again in 1281. Though they established a beachhead at Hakata, Kyushu, they were driven out within a short time by army of Hojo Tokimune.

- 23 November 1275 (Kenji 1, 5th day of the 11th month): Hirohito-shinnō was named Crown Prince and heir to his first cousin, the Daikakuji-tō Emperor Go-Uda. This was the result of political maneuvering by Hirohito's father, the Jimyōin-tō Emperor Go-Fukakusa.

In 1287, retired Emperor Go-Fukakusa, dissatisfied with the fact that his own lineage (the Jimyōin-tō) did not control the throne, while that of his younger brother, the retired Emperor Kameyama (the Daikakuji-tō) did, persuaded both the Bakufu and the imperial court to compel the Emperor to abdicate in favor of Go-Fukakusa's son (Emperor Fushimi).

After this time, the struggle between the Jimyōin-tō and the Daikakuji-tō over the imperial throne continued. After Go-Uda's abdication, his Daikakuji-tō controlled the throne from 1301 to 1308 (Emperor Go-Nijō) and again from 1318 until the era of northern and southern courts (begun 1332) when they became the southern court (ending in 1392).

Go-Uda was cloistered emperor during the reign of his own son, Go-Nijō, from 1301 until 1308, and again from 1318, when his second son Go-Daigo took the throne until 1321, when Go-Daigo began direct rule.

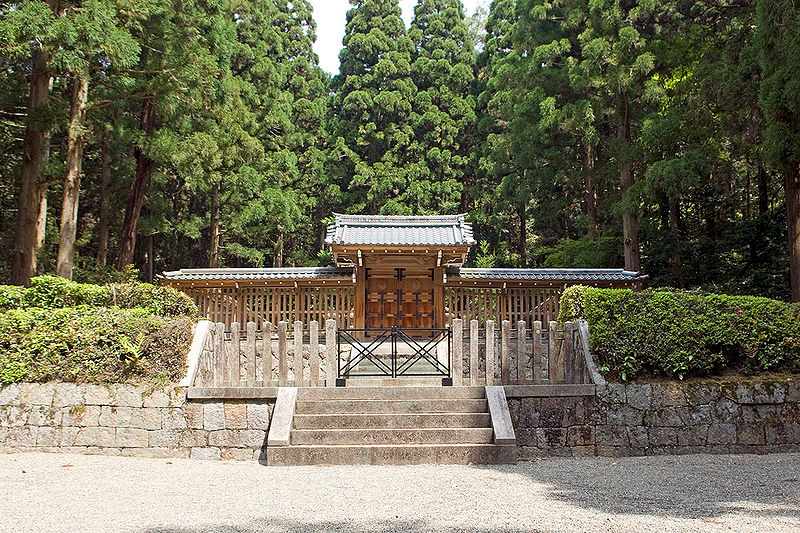
Memorial Shinto shrine and mausoleum honoring Emperor Go-Uda.

- 16 July 1324 (Genkō 4, 25th day of the 6th month): Go-Uda died at age 58.

Emperor Go-Uda's Imperial mausoleum is the Rengebuji no misasagi (蓮華峯寺陵) in Ukyō-ku, Kyoto.

== Kugyō ==
Kugyō (公卿) is a collective term for the very few most powerful men attached to the court of the Emperor of Japan in pre-Meiji eras. Even during those years in which the court's actual influence outside the palace walls was minimal, the hierarchic organization persisted.

In general, this elite group included only three to four men at a time. These were hereditary courtiers whose experience and background would have brought them to the pinnacle of a life's career. During Go-Uda's reign, this apex of the Daijō-kan included:

- Sesshō, Kujō Tadaie, 1274
- Sesshō, Ichijō Ietsune, 1274–1275
- Sesshō, Takatsukasa Kanehira, 1275–1278
- Kampaku, Takatsukasa Kanehira, 1278–1287
- Kampaku, Nijō Morotada, 1287–1289
- Sadaijin
- Udaijin
- Nadaijin
- Dainagon

== Eras of Go-Uda's reign ==
The years of Go-Uda's reign are more specifically identified by more than one era name or nengō.

- Bun'ei (1264–1275)
- Kenji (1275–1278)
- Kōan (1278–1288)

== Notes ==
Japanese Imperial kamon — a stylized chrysanthemum blossom

== See also ==
- Emperor of Japan
- List of Emperors of Japan
- Imperial cult

Regnal titles
Preceded by Emperor Kameyama	Emperor of Japan: Go-Uda; 1274–1287	Succeeded by Emperor Fushimi
