= Emperor Go-Nijō =

Emperor of Japan from 1301 to 1308

Emperor Go-Nijō 後二条天皇
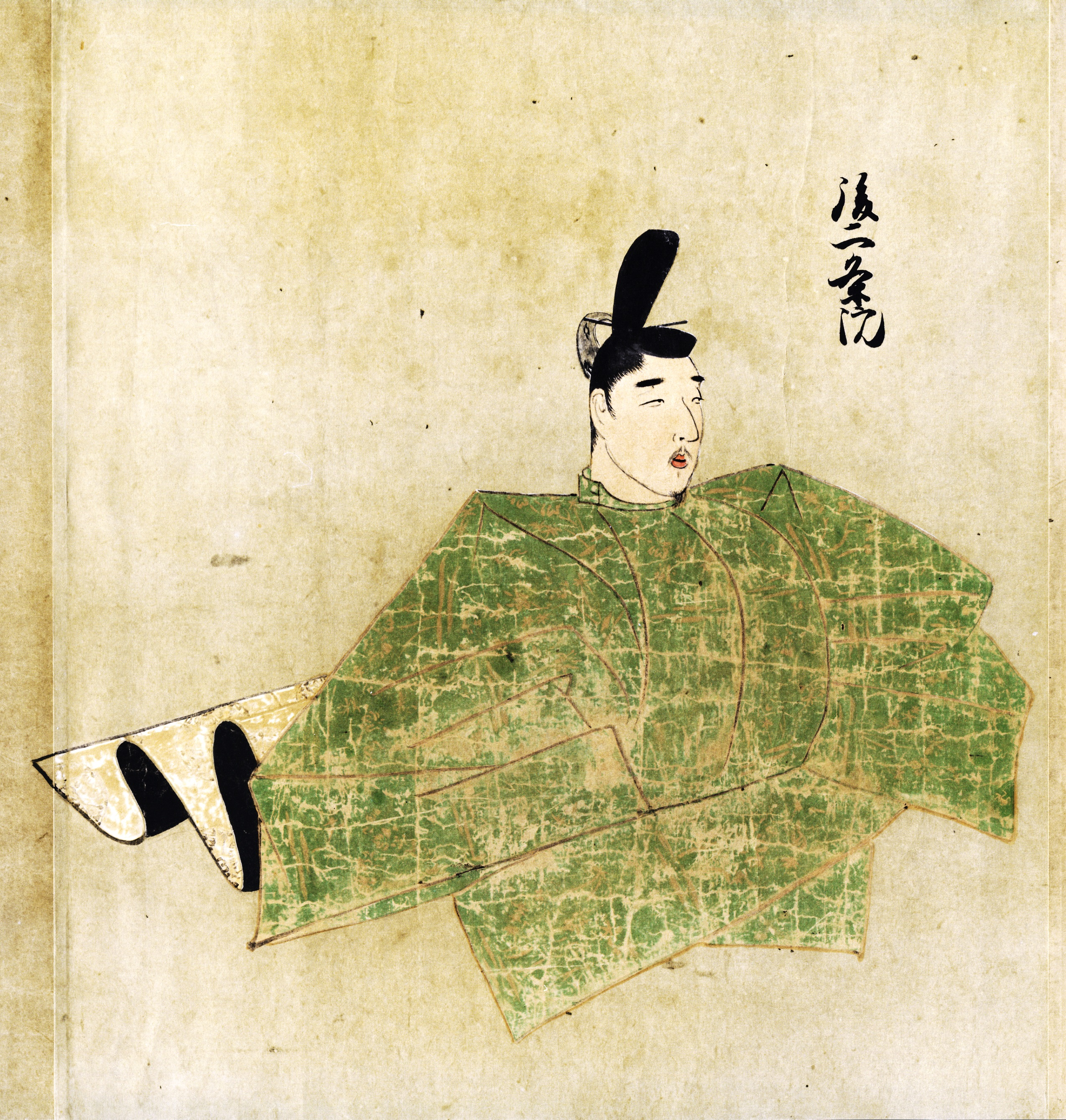
- Portrait from the Tenshi Sekkan Miei

Emperor of Japan
- Reign: 2 March 1301 – 10 September 1308
- Enthronement: 3 May 1301
- Predecessor: Go-Fushimi
- Successor: Hanazono
- Shōgun: Prince Hisaaki
- Born: 9 March 1285
- Died: 10 September 1308 (aged 23); Heian-kyō, Kamakura shogunate
- Burial: Kitashirakawa no Misasagi (北白河陵) (Kyoto)
- Spouse: Fujiwara no Kinshi (m. 1303)
- Issue: See below
Posthumous name
- Tsuigō: Emperor Go-Nijō (後二条院 or 後二条天皇)
- House: Imperial House of Japan
- Father: Emperor Go-Uda
- Mother: Horikawa (Minamoto) Motoko
- Religion: State Shinto
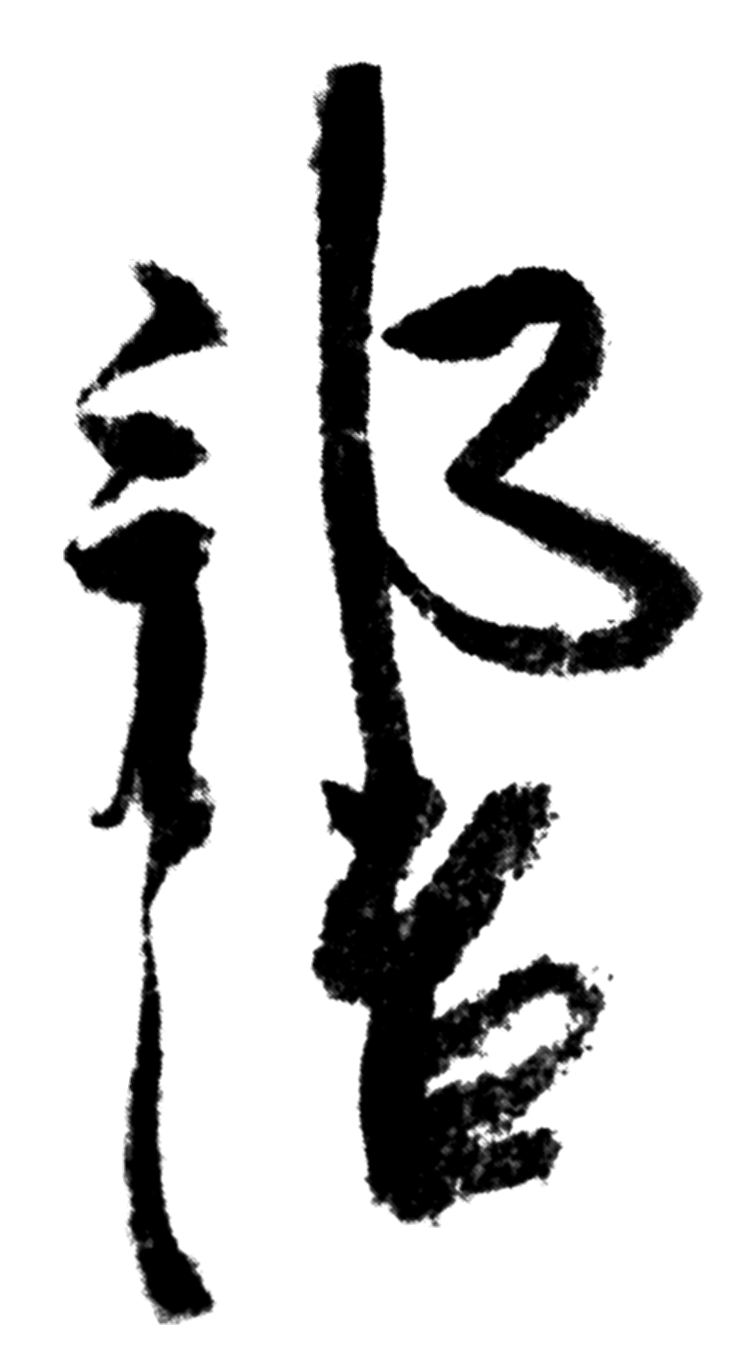
- Signature

Emperor Go-Nijō (後二条天皇, Go-Nijō-tennō; 9 March 1285 – 10 September 1308) was the 94th emperor of Japan, according to the traditional order of succession. He reigned from 1301 to his death in 1308.

This 14th-century sovereign was named after the 12th-century Emperor Nijō, and go- (後), translates literally as "later"; and thus, he is sometimes called the "Later Emperor Nijō", or, in some older sources, may be identified as "Nijō, the second" or as "Nijo II".

== Genealogy ==
Before his ascension to the Chrysanthemum Throne, his personal name (his imina) was Kuniharu-shinnō (邦治親王).

Go-Nijō was the eldest son of the 91st emperor Emperor Go-Uda. He belonged to the Daikakuji-tō branch of the Imperial Family.

Empress: Fujiwara no Kinshi (藤原忻子) later Chōrakumon-in (長楽門院), Tokudaiji Kintaka's daughter

Naishi: Fujiwara Tamako (藤原 頊子) later Banshūmon-in (万秋門院; 1268 - 1338), Ichijō Sanetsune’s daughter

Lady-in-waiting: Fujiwara Muneko (藤原 宗子) also Chunagon'no-tenji (中納言典侍), Itsutsuji Munechika’s daughter

- First Son: Imperial Prince Kuniyoshi (邦良親王; 1300 - 1326）
- Second Son: Imperial Prince Hanamachi-no-miya-Kunimi (花町宮邦省親王; 1302-1375)

Naishi: Koto Naishi, Taira Munetoshi’s daughter

- First Daughter: Imperial Princess Benshi (㛹子内親王; 1302 - 1362）later Jyuseimon'in/jyujoumon'in (壽成門院/寿成門院)

Court Lady: Dainagon-no-tsubone (fujiwara), Sanjo Kinyasu’s daughter

- Third Son: Imperial Prince Priest Yujo (祐助法親王; 1302 - 1359）
- Fourth Son: Imperial Prince Priest Shoson (聖尊法親王; 1303 - 1370）
- Third Daughter: Imperial Princess Eiko (栄子内親王)
- Fifth Daughter

Court Lady: Lady Mikushige (fujiwara), Sanjo Kinchika

- Fifth Son: Imperial Prince Sonsai (尊済法親王; 1304 - 1329)

Court Lady: Taira Nobusuke’s daughter

- Fourth Daughter: Imperial Princess Choshi (瑒子内親王)

Court Lady: Shindainagon-no-Tsubone

- Second daughter: Imperial Princess Minshi (珉子内親王)

== Events of Go-Nijō's life ==
Kuniharu-shinnō was made an imperial prince by Imperial proclamation in 1286.

In 1296, he became crown prince (heir) to the Jimyōin-tō Emperor Go-Fushimi, his second cousin.

- 2 March 1301 (Shōan 3, 21st day of the 1st month): In the 5th year of Go-Fushimi-tennō's reign (後伏見天皇五年), the emperor was forced to abdicate; and the succession (‘‘senso’’) was received by his cousin. Shortly thereafter, Emperor Go-Nijō is said to have acceded to the throne (‘‘sokui’’).

Go-Nijō's father, the Emperor Go-Uda reigned as cloistered emperor during his reign.

The succession dispute between the Daikakuji and Jimyōin branches of the Imperial Family continued during his reign. His grandfather, the retired Emperor Emperor Kameyama was said to have acted through the Bakufu to ensure Go-Nijō's enthronement.

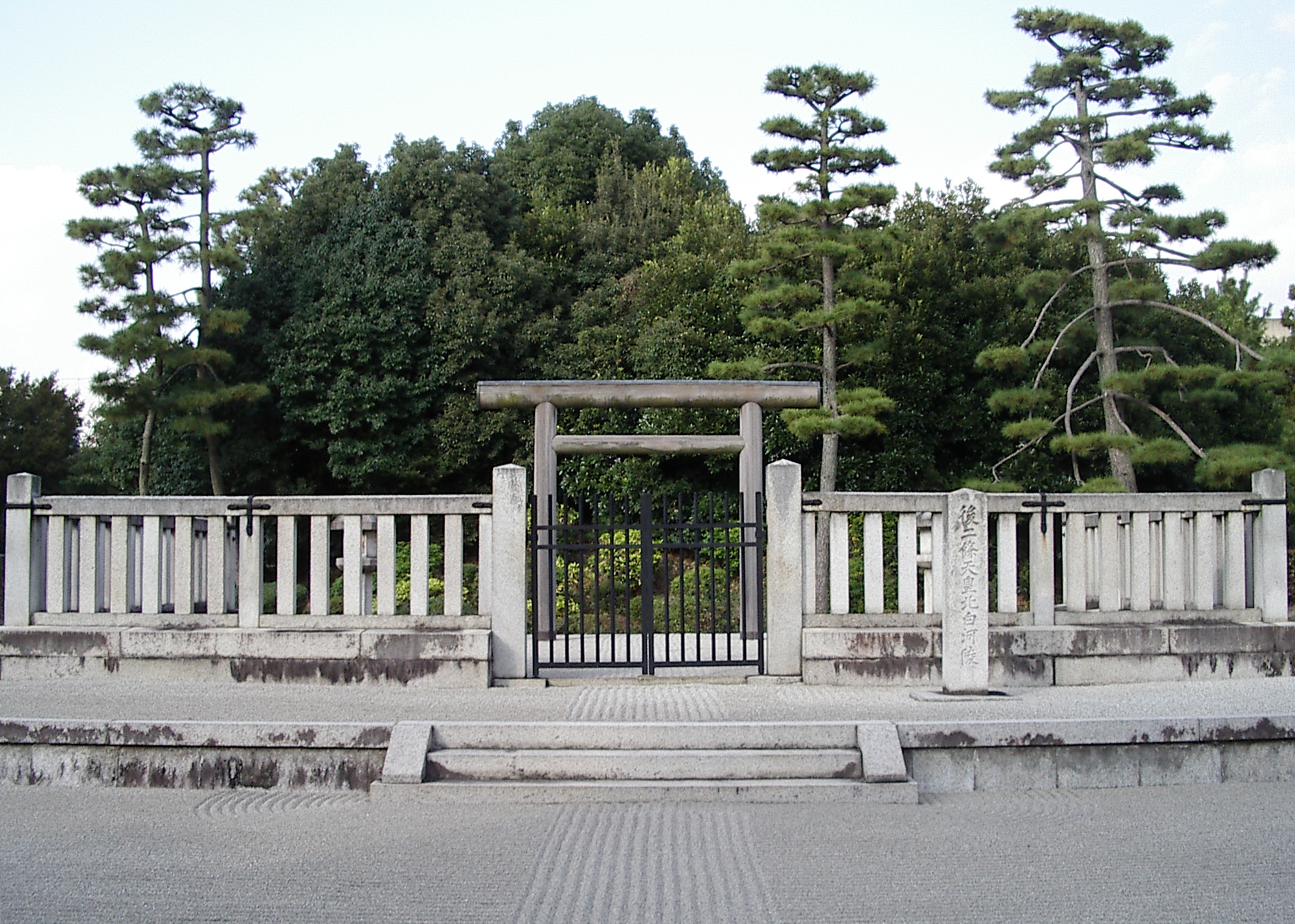
Mausoleum (Misgasagi) of Emperor Go-Nijō.

On 10 September 1308, Go-Nijō died of illness.

Go-Nijō is buried at Kitashirakawa no misasagi (北白河陵) in Sakyō-ku, Kyoto.

=== Kugyō ===
Kugyō (公卿) is a collective term for the very few most powerful men attached to the court of the Emperor of Japan in pre-Meiji eras. Even during those years in which the court's actual influence outside the palace walls was minimal, the hierarchic organization persisted.

In general, this elite group included only three to four men at a time. These were hereditary courtiers whose experience and background would have brought them to the pinnacle of a life's career. During Nijō's reign, this apex of the Daijō-kan included:

- Kampaku, Nijō Kanemoto, 1300–1305
- Kampaku, Kujō Moronori, 1305–1308
- Sadaijin
- Udaijin
- Nadaijin
- Dainagon

== Eras of Go-Nijō's reign ==
The years of Go-Nijō's reign are more specifically identified by more than one era name or nengō.

- Shōan (1299–1302)
- Kengen (1302–1303)
- Kagen (1303–1306)
- Tokuji (1306–1308)

== Notes ==
Japanese Imperial kamon — a stylized chrysanthemum blossom

== See also ==
- Emperor of Japan
- List of Emperors of Japan
- Imperial cult

Regnal titles
Preceded by Emperor Go-Fushimi	Emperor of Japan: Go-Nijō; 1301–1308	Succeeded by Emperor Hanazono
