= Kengen =

Period of Japanese history (1302–1303 CE)

Kengen 乾元
- November 1302 – August 1303
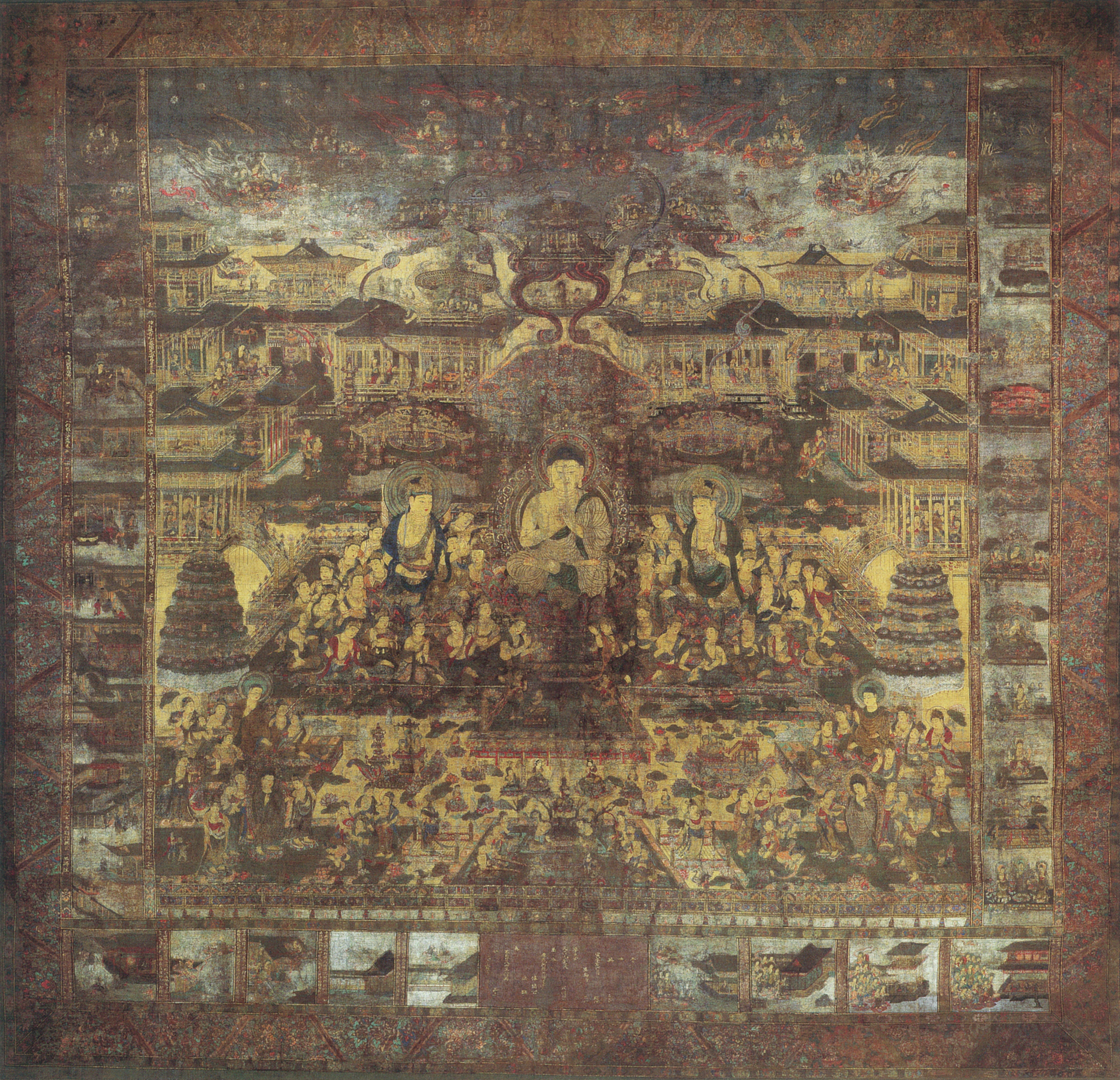
- Taima mandala (painted 1302)
- Location: Japan
- Monarch(s): Emperor Go-Nijō

Kengen (乾元) was a Japanese era name (年号, nengō, lit. "year name") after Shōan and before Kagen. This period spanned the years from November 1302 through August 1303. The reigning emperor was Go-Nijō-tennō (後二条天皇).

== Change of era ==
- 1302 Kengen gannen (乾元元年): The new era name was created to mark an event or a number of events. The previous era ended and a new one commenced in Shōan 4. The era name is derived from the I Ching and combines the characters 乾 ("heaven" in the Bagua) and 元 ("foundation").

== Events of the Kengen era ==
- 1302 (Kengen 1, 16th day of the 6th month):Emperor Go-Nijo visited the home of retired Emperor Kameyama.
- 1302 (Kengen 1): Major repairs and reconstruction at Yakushi-ji.

== Notes ==
Preceded by Shōan	Era or nengō Kengen; 1302–1303	Succeeded by Kagen
