= Shōan =

Period of Japanese history (1299–1302 CE)

Shōan 正安
- April 1299 – November 1302
Einin	Kengen
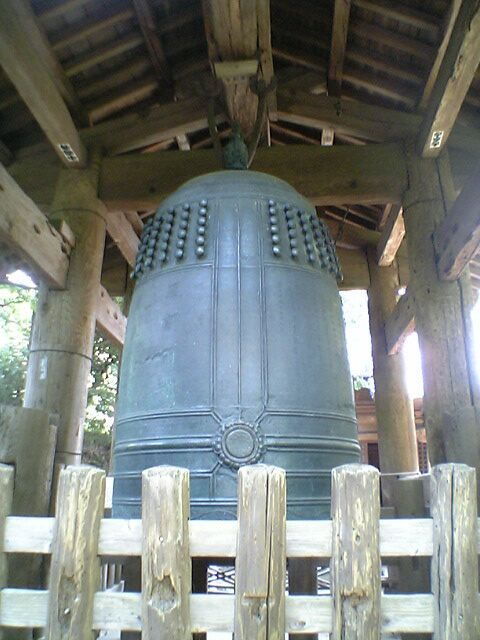
- The Great Bell at Engaku-ji was cast in 1301
- Location: Japan
- Monarch(s): Emperor Go-Fushimi (to March 1301); Emperor Go-Nijō (from March 1301)

Shōan (正安) is an era in Japanese history. This era spanned the years from April 1299 through November 1302. Preceding it was the Einin era, and following it was the Kengen era. The reigning emperors were Go-Fushimi-tennō (後伏見天皇) and Go-Nijō-tennō (後二条天皇).

== Change of era ==
- 1299 Shōan gannen (正安元年): The new era name was created to mark an event or a number of events. The previous era ended and a new one commenced in Einin 7. The era name is derived from the Kongzi Jiayu (School Sayings of Confucius) and combines the characters 正 ("justice") and 安 ("peaceful").

== Events of the Shōan era ==
- November 1, 1299 (Shōan 1, 8th day of the 10th month): Chinese Chan master Yishan Yining arrived in Kamakura as a last Mongol envoy.
- March 2, 1301 (Shōan 3, 21st day of the 1st month): In the 5th year of Go-Fushimi-tennō's reign (後伏見天皇5年), the emperor was forced to abdicate; and the succession (‘‘senso’’) was received by his cousin. Shortly thereafter, Emperor Go-Nijō is said to have acceded to the throne (‘‘sokui’’).
- 1301 (Shōan 3): Gokenho, a Buddhist text was printed.
- 1302 (Shōan 4): Eikan-dō Zenrin-ji mandala is said to have been completed.

== Notes ==
Preceded by Einin	Era or nengō Shōan; 1299–1302	Succeeded by Kengen
