= Nijō Morotada =

Japanese kugyō

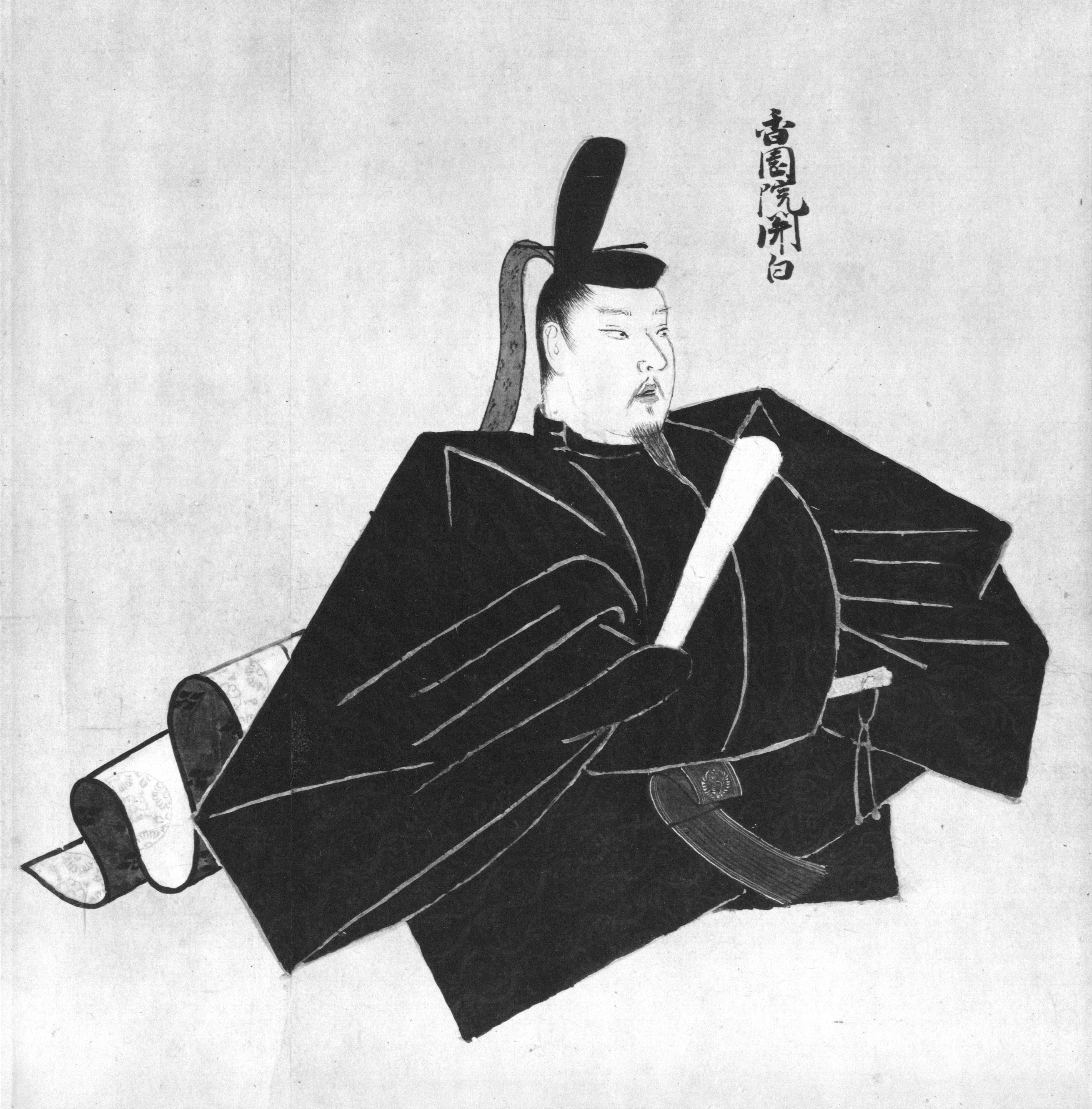
Nijō Morotada.jpg

Nijō Morotada (二条 師忠; 1254 – 1341) was a Japanese kugyō (court noble) of the Kamakura period. He was a member of the Nijō family, which was a branch of the Fujiwara clan.

== Early life ==
Morotada was the son of regent Nijō Yoshizane.

== Career ==
During the reign of Emperor Fushimi, he was kampaku from 1287 to 1289.

He adopted Nijō Kanemoto as his son.
