= Einin =

Period of Japanese history (1293–1299 CE)

Einin 永仁
- August 1293 – April 1299
Shōō	Shōan
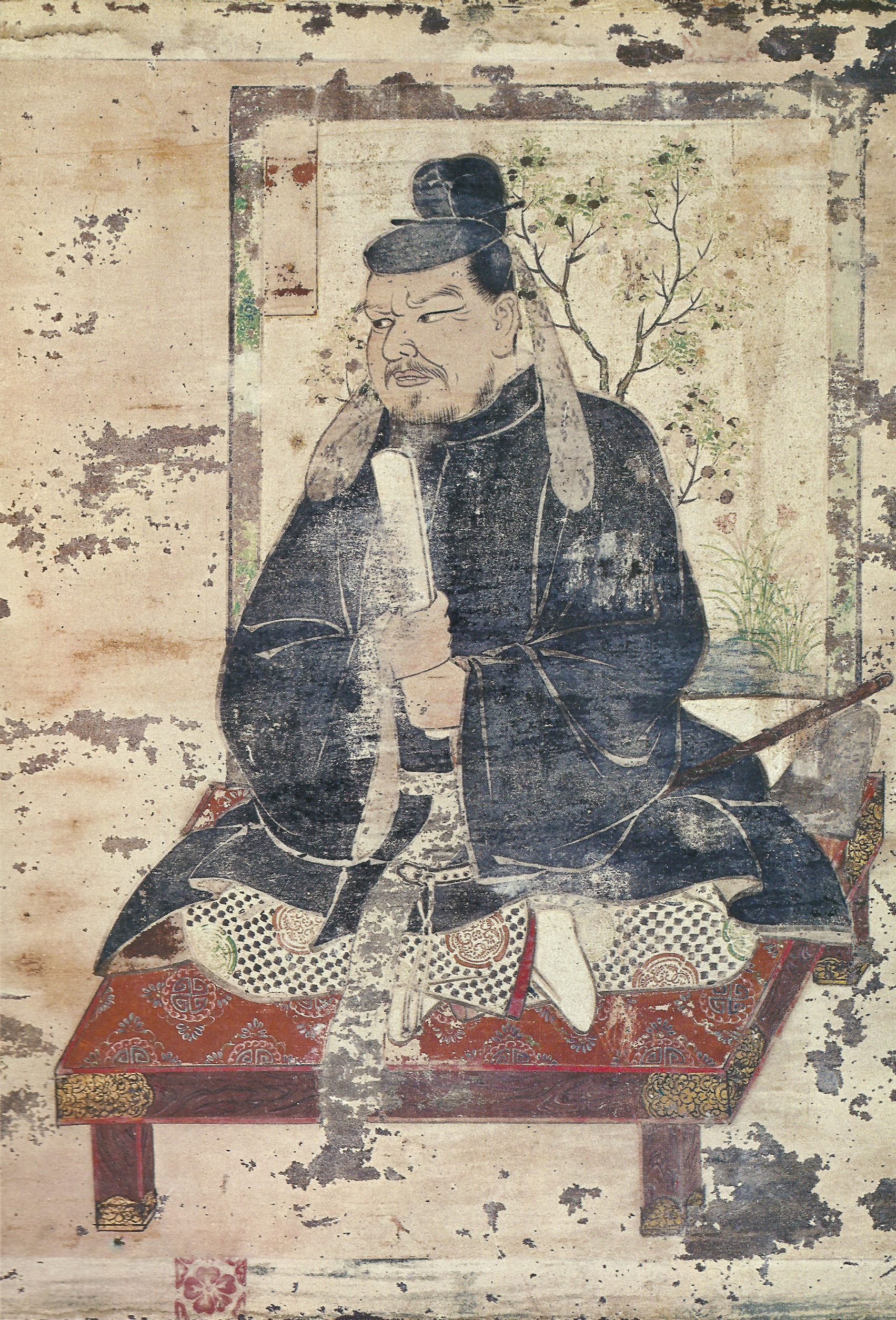
- Portrait of Hachiman, 1295
- Location: Japan
- Monarch(s): Emperor Fushimi (to August 1298); Emperor Go-Fushimi (from August 1298)

Einin (永仁) was a Japanese era name (年号, nengō; lit. "year name") after Shōō and before Shōan. This period spanned the years from August 1293 through April 1299. The reigning emperors were Fushimi-tennō (伏見天皇) and Go-Fushimi-tennō (後伏見天皇).

== Change of era ==
- 1293 Einin gannen (永仁元年): The new era name was created to mark an event or a number of events. The previous era ended and a new one commenced in Shō'ō 6. The era name is derived from the Book of Jin and combines the characters 永 ("eternity") and 仁 ("benevolence").

== Events of the Einen era ==
- August 30, 1298 (Einin 6, 22nd day of the 7th month): In the 11th year of Fushimi-tennō's reign (伏見天皇11年), the emperor abdicated; and the succession (senso) was received by his son.
- November 17, 1298 (Einin 6, 13th day of the 10th month): Emperor Go-Fushimi is said to have acceded to the throne (sokui) and the nengō was changed to Shōan to mark the beginning of a new emperor's reign.
- 1299 (Einin 7): The 8th rector of the nunnery at Hokkeji died.

== Notes ==
Preceded by Shōō	Era or nengō Einin; 1293–1299	Succeeded by Shōan
