= Shōō (Kamakura period) =

Period of Japanese history (1288–1293 CE)

Shōō 正応
- April 1288 – August 1293
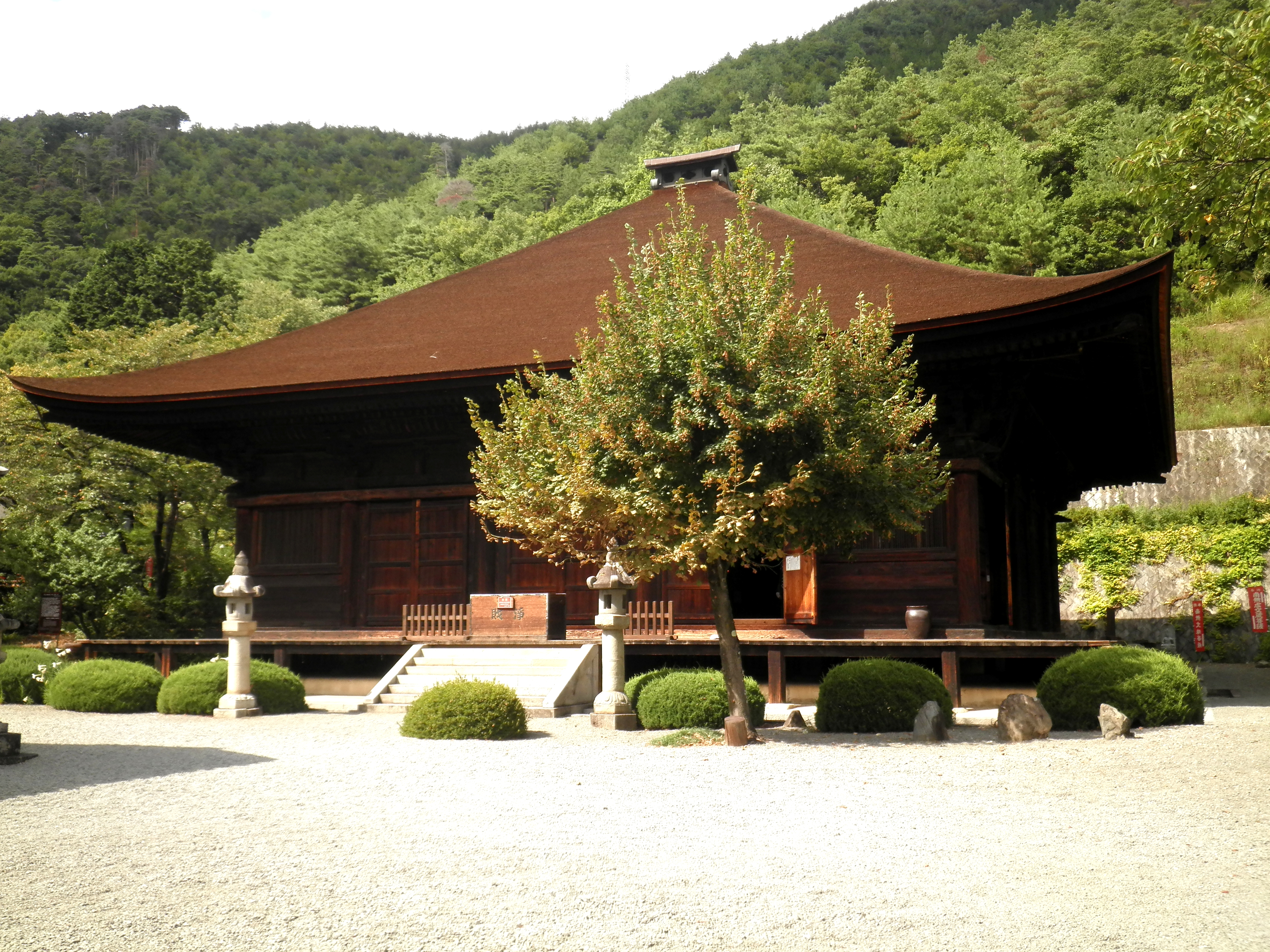
- Yakushi Hall, Daizen-ji, built in 1290
- Location: Japan
- Monarch(s): Emperor Fushimi

Shōō (正応) was a Japanese era name (年号, nengō, lit. "year name") after Kōan and before Einin. This period spanned the years from April 1288 through August 1293. The reigning emperor was Fushimi-tennō (伏見天皇).

== Change of era ==
- 1288 Shōō gannen (正応元年): The new era name was created to mark an event or a number of events. The previous era ended and a new one commenced in Kōan 11. The era name is derived from the Notes on the Mao Commentary and combines the characters 正 ("correct") and 応 ("balanced").

== Events of the Shōō era ==
- April 16, 1288 (Shōō 1, 15th day of the 3rd month): The accession of Emperor Fushimi took place.
- 1288 (Shōō 1): Oracles of the three deities — Amaterasu, Hachiman and Kasuga appeared on the surface of the pond at Todaiji in Nara.
- May 26, 1293 (Shōō 6, 13th day of the 4th month): An earthquake in Kamakura, Japan kills an estimated 23,000.

== Notes ==
Preceded by Kōan	Era or nengō Shōō; 1288–1293	Succeeded by Einin
