= Kagen =

Period of Japanese history (1303–1306 CE)

Kagen 嘉元
- August 1303 – December 1306
Kengen	Tokuji
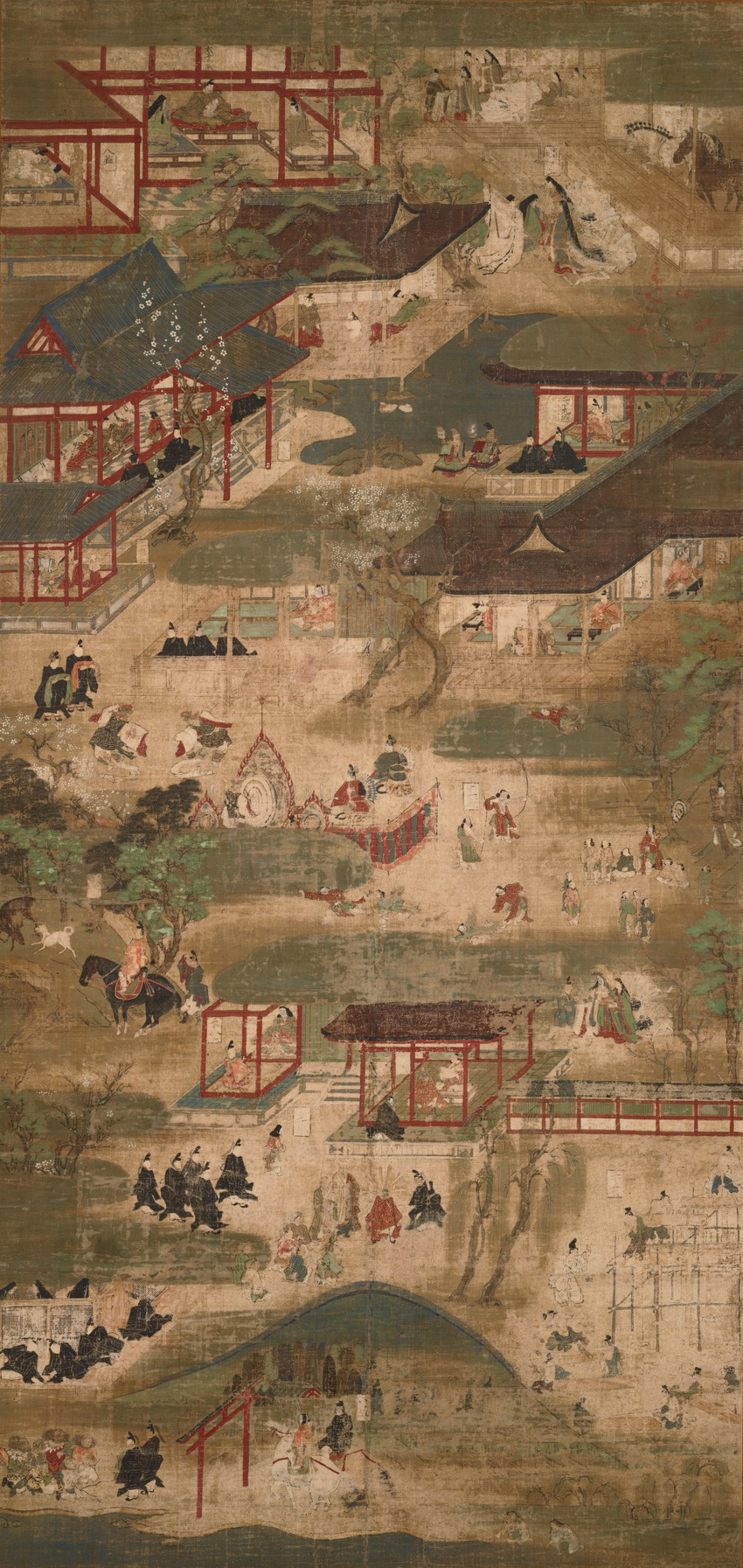
- Part of the Pictorial Biography of Prince Shōtoku (painted by Kōzuke Hokkyō and Tajima Bō, 1305)
- Location: Japan
- Monarch: Emperor Go-Nijō

Kagen (嘉元) was a Japanese era name (年号, nengō; lit. "year name") after Kengen and before Tokuji. This period spanned the years from August 1303 through December 1306. The reigning emperor was Go-Nijō-tennō (後二条天皇).

== Change of era ==
- 1303 Kagen gannen (嘉元元年): The new era name was created to mark an event or series of events. The previous era ended and the new one commenced in Kengen 2. The era name is derived from the Yiwen Leiju (AD 624) and combines the characters 嘉 ("auspicious") and 元 ("foundation").

== Events of the Kagen era ==
- July 17–27, 1303 (Kagen 1, 13th-23rd days of the 6th month): A white comet ("broom star") was seen at azimuth in the northeast each day at dawn for 10 days.
- October 4, 1305 (Kagen 3, 15th days of the 9th month): Former Emperor Kameyama's death.

== Notes ==
Preceded by Kengen	Era or nengō Kagen; 1303–1306	Succeeded by Tokuji
