= Emperor Hanazono =

Emperor of Japan from 1308 to 1318

Emperor Hanazono 花園天皇
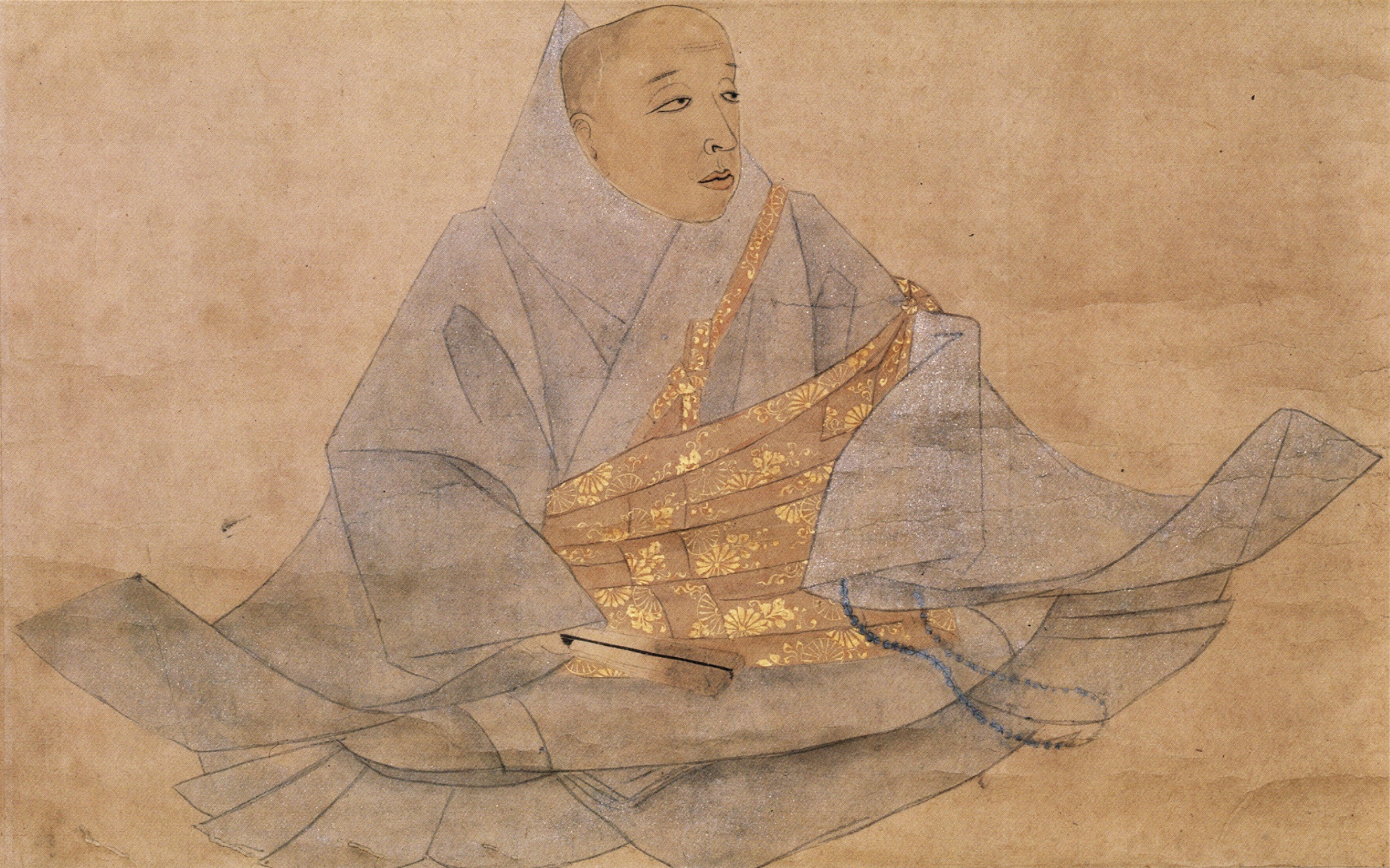
- Portrait by Fujiwara no Gōshin, 1338

Emperor of Japan
- Reign: 11 September 1308 – 29 March 1318
- Enthronement: 29 November 1308
- Predecessor: Go-Nijō
- Successor: Go-Daigo
- Shōgun: Prince Morikuni
- Born: 14 August 1297
- Died: 2 December 1348 (aged 51); Hagiwara palace, Heian-kyō, Ashikaga shogunate
- Burial: Jirakūu-in no ue no Misasagi (十樂院上陵) (Kyoto)
- Issue: See below
Posthumous name
- Tsuigō: Emperor Hanazono (花園院 or 花園天皇)
- House: Imperial House of Japan
- Father: Emperor Fushimi
- Mother: Tōin Fujiwara
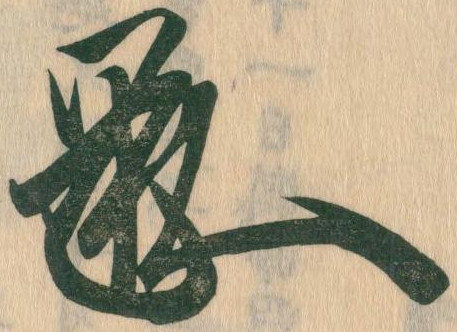
- Signature

Emperor Hanazono (花園天皇, Hanazono-tennō; 14 August 1297 – 2 December 1348) was the 95th emperor of Japan, according to the traditional order of succession. His reign spanned the years from 1308 through 1318.

== Genealogy ==
Before his ascension to the Chrysanthemum Throne, his personal name (his imina) was Tomihito-shinnō (富仁親王).

He was the fourth son of the 92nd Emperor, Fushimi. He belonged to the Jimyōin-tō branch of the Imperial Family.

- Consort: Ogimachi Michiko (正親町実子) later Senkomon'in (宣光門院, 1297–1360), Ogimachi Saneakira's daughter
  - First Daughter: Imperial Princess Hisako (1318–1358; 寿子内親王) later Kianmon-in (徽安門院), married Emperor Kogon
  - Second Son: Imperial Prince Nobunaga (業永親王; 1327–1353) later Imperial Prince priest Genshi (源性入道親王)
  - Third son: Imperial Prince Naohito (直仁親王; 1335–1398)
  - Daughter: Imperial Princess Noriko (儀子内親王; d. 1348)
  - Priest Shōgoin
  - Daughter married to Kazan'in clan
- Consort: Ichijo-no-Tsubone (d. 1325), Ogimachi Saneakira's daughter
  - First Son: Imperial Prince Priest Kakuyo (1320–1382; 覚誉法親王)
- Lady-in-waiting: Wamuro Yoriko (葉室頼子), Wamuro Yorito's daughter
  - Fifth Daughter: Imperial Princess Noriko (祝子内親王) – Nun
  - Princess

== Events of Hanazono's life ==
Tomihito-shinnō became emperor upon the death of his second cousin, the Daikakuji-tō Emperor Go-Nijō.

- Tokuji 3, in the 8th month (1308): In the 8th year of Go-Nijo-tennō's reign (後二条天皇八年), the emperor died at the young age of 24; and the succession (senso) was received by his cousin. Shortly thereafter, Emperor Hanazono is said to have acceded to the throne (sokui).
- Tokuji 3, in the 10th month (1308): The nengō was changed to Enkyō to mark the accession of Emperor Hanazono.

Hanazono's father, the retired-Emperor Fushimi, and Hanazono's brother, the retired-Emperor Go-Fushimi, both exerted influence as cloistered emperors during this reign.

In these years, negotiations between the Kamakura Bakufu and the two imperial lines resulted in an agreement to alternate the throne between the two lines every 10 years (the Bumpō Agreement). This agreement was not long-lasting. The negotiated provisions would soon be broken by Hanazono's successor.

In 1318, he abdicated to his second cousin, the Daikakuji-tō Emperor Go-Daigo, who was Nijō's brother.

After his abdication, he raised his nephew, the future Northern Pretender Emperor Kōgon.

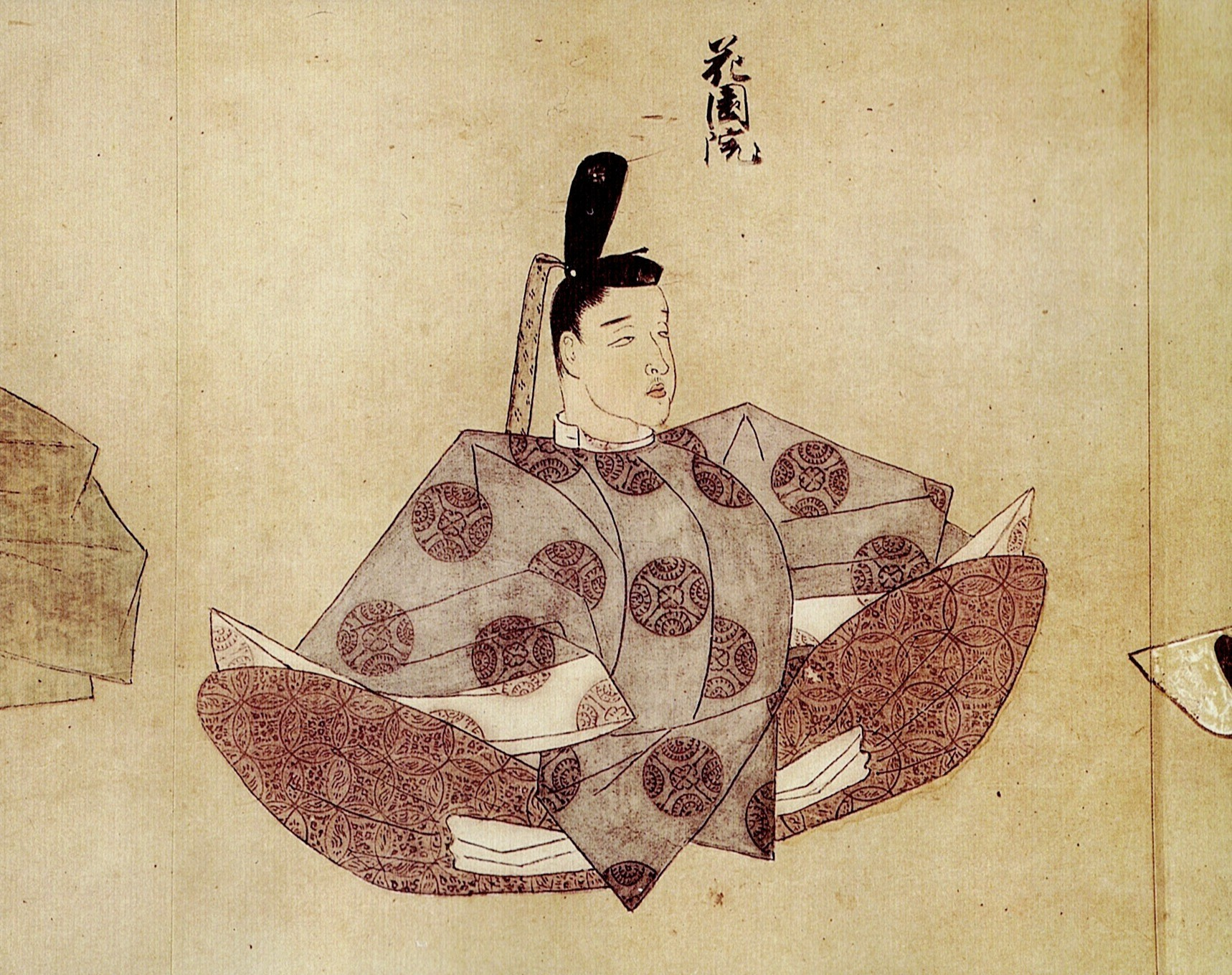
Retired emperor Hanazono before taking the tonsure.

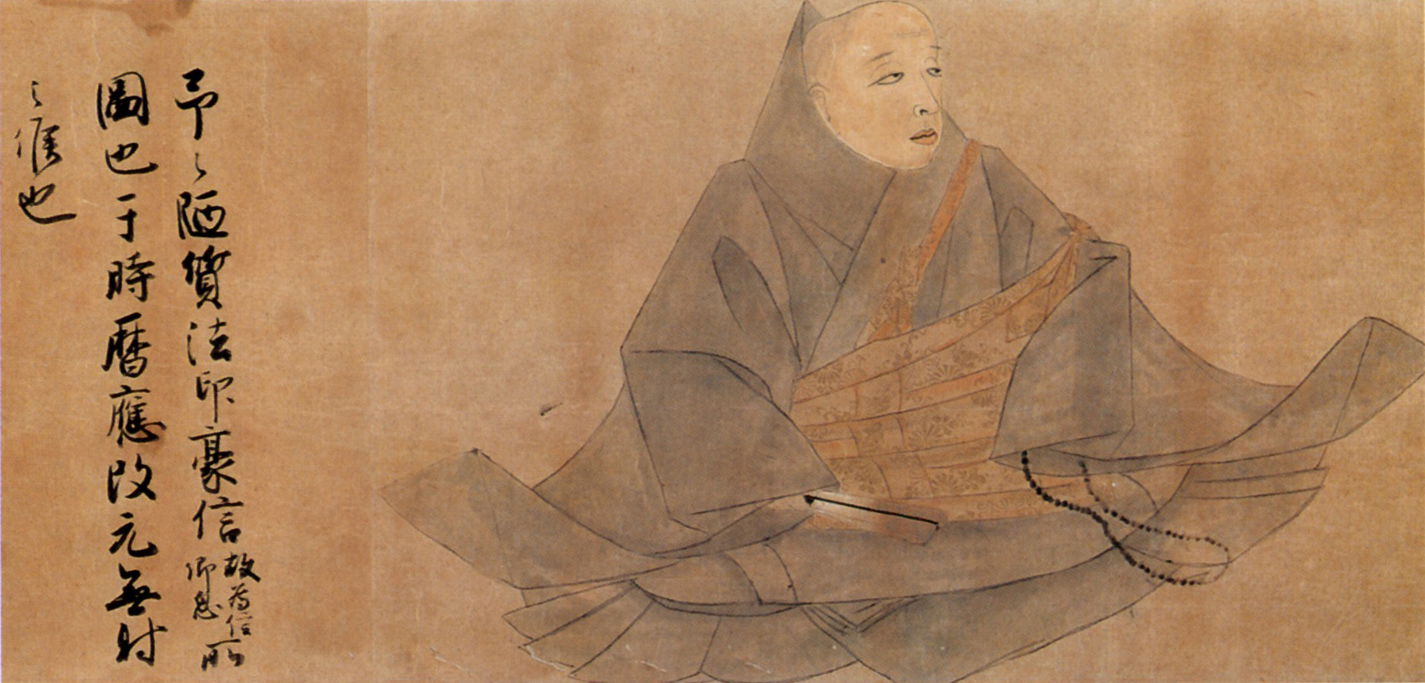
Retired emperor Hanazono after taking the tonsure.

In 1335, he became a Buddhist monk of the Zen sect, and under his sponsorship, his palace became the temple of Myōshin-ji, now the largest network in Rinzai Buddhism. Many places and institutions in the area are named for him, including Hanazono University (the Rinzai university) and Hanazono Station.

He died in 1348. Hanazono's imperial tomb is known as Jurakuin no ue no misasagi; it is located in Higashiyama-ku, Kyoto.

He excelled at waka composition, and was an important member of the Kyōgoku School. He also left behind a diary, called Hanazono-in-Minki (Imperial Chronicles of the Flower Garden Temple or Hanazono-in) (花園院宸記). He was a very religious and literate person, never missing his prayers to the Amitabha Buddha.

=== Kugyō ===
Kugyō (公卿) is a collective term for the very few most powerful noble men attached to the imperial court of the Emperor of Japan in pre-Meiji eras. Even during those years in which the court's actual influence outside the palace walls was minimal, the hierarchic organization persisted.

In general, this elite group included only three to four men at a time. These were hereditary courtiers whose experience and background would have brought them to the pinnacle of a life's career. During Hanazono's reign, this apex of the Daijō-kan included:

- Sesshō, Kujō Moronori, 1308
- Sesshō, Takatsukasa Fuyuhira, 1308–1311
- Kampaku, Takatsukasa Fuyuhira, 1311–1313
- Kampaku, Konoe Iehira, 1313–1315
- Kampaku, Takatsukasa Fuyuhira, 1315–1316
- Kampaku, Nijō Michihira, 1316–1318
- Sadaijin
- Udaijin
- Nadaijin
- Dainagon

== Eras of Hanazono's reign ==
The years of Hanazono's reign are more specifically identified by more than one era name or nengō.

- Tokuji (1306–1308)
- Enkyō (1308–1311)
- Ōchō (1311–1312)
- Shōwa (1312–1317)
- Bumpō (1317–1319)

== See also ==
- Emperor of Japan
- List of Emperors of Japan
- Imperial cult
- Emperor Go-Hanazono

== Notes ==
Japanese Imperial kamon – a stylized chrysanthemum blossom

Regnal titles
Preceded by Emperor Go-Nijō	Emperor of Japan: Hanazono; 1308–1318	Succeeded by Emperor Go-Daigo
