= Emperor Fushimi =

Emperor of Japan from 1287 to 1298

Emperor Fushimi 伏見天皇
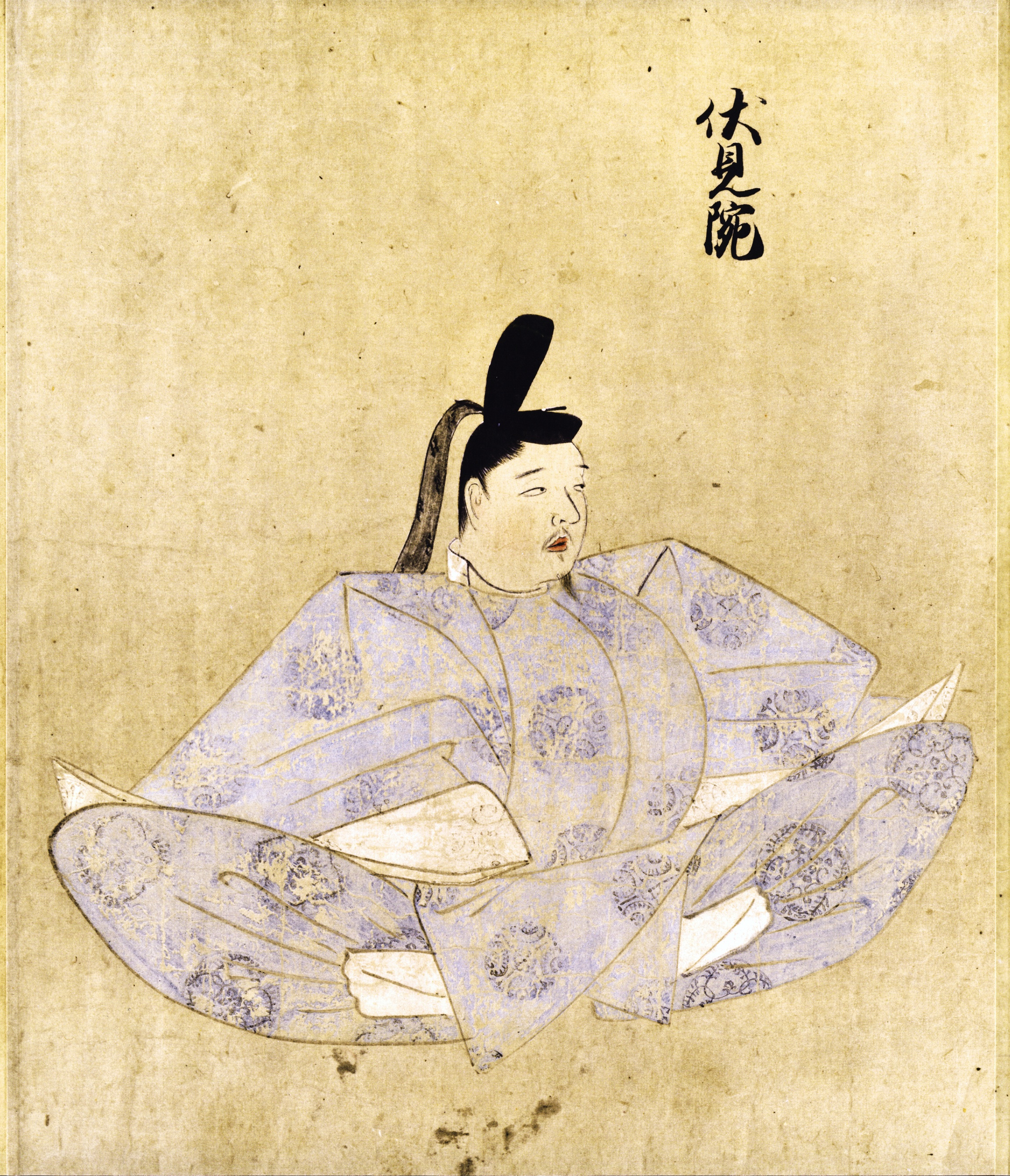
- Portrait from the Tenshi Sekkan Miei

Emperor of Japan
- Reign: 27 November 1287 – 30 August 1298
- Enthronement: 16 April 1288
- Predecessor: Go-Uda
- Successor: Go-Fushimi
- Shōgun: Prince Koreyasu; Prince Hisaaki
- Born: 10 May 1265
- Died: 8 October 1317 (aged 52); Jimyōin (持明院), Heian-kyō
- Burial: Fukakusa no kita no Misasagi (深草北陵) (Kyoto)
- Spouse: Saionji Shōshi
- Issue more...: Emperor Go-Fushimi; Emperor Hanazono
Posthumous name
- Tsuigō: Emperor Fushimi (伏見院 or 伏見天皇)
- House: Imperial House of Japan
- Father: Emperor Go-Fukakusa
- Mother: Tōin (Fujiwara)

Emperor Fushimi (伏見天皇, Fushimi-tennō; 10 May 1265 – 8 October 1317) was the 92nd emperor of Japan, according to the traditional order of succession. His reign spanned the years from 1287 through 1298.

== Name ==
Before his ascension to the Chrysanthemum Throne, his personal name (his imina) was Hirohito-shinnō (熈仁親王).

Although the Roman-alphabet spelling of the name of this 13th-century emperor is the same as the personal name of the 20th century Emperor Shōwa, the kanji are different:

- Emperor Fushimi, formerly Prince Hirohito (熈仁)
- Emperor Shōwa, also known as Emperor Hirohito (裕仁)

== Genealogy ==
He was the second son of Emperor Go-Fukakusa. They were from the Jimyōin-tō line.

- Empress: Saionji (Fujiwara) Shoshi (西園寺（藤原）鏱子) later Eifukumon’In (永福門院), Saionji Sanekane‘s daughter
- Consort: Tōin (Fujiwara) Sueko (洞院（藤原）季子) later Kenshinmon-in (顕親門院; 1265-1336), Tōin Saneo‘s daughter
  - First daughter: Imperial Princess Jushi (甝子内親王; 1287-1310) later Sakuheimon-in (朔平門院)
  - Third son: Imperial Prince Priest Kansho (寛性入道親王; 1289-1346)
  - Third daughter: Imperial Princess Enshi (延子内親王; b.1291) later Enmeimon-in (延明門院)
  - Fourth son: Imperial Prince Tomihito (富仁親王) later Emperor Hanazono
- Lady-in-waiting: Itsutsuji (Fujiwara) Tsuneko (五辻（藤原）経子; d.1324), Itsutsuji Tsuneuji‘s daughter
  - First son: Imperial Prince Tanehito (胤仁親王) later Emperor Go-Fushimi
- Court Lady: Toin (Fujiwara) Eiko (洞院（藤原）英子), Tōin Kinmune’s daughter
  - Second daughter: Imperial Princess Shigeko (誉子内親王) later Shogakumon’in (章義門院)
- Court Lady: Ogimachi Moriko (正親町守子), Ogimachi Michiakira’s daughter
  - Son: Imperial Prince Priest Kan’in (寛胤法親王)
  - Son: Imperial Prince Priest Doki (道凞法親王)
- Lady-in-waiting: Gondainagon-no-Tsubone (権大納言局), Nakanoin Tomouji’s daughter
  - Sixth Son: Imperial Prince Priest Son’go (尊悟入道親王; 1299-1359)
- Naishi: Miyoshi Hirako (三善衡子), Miyoshi Toshihira’s daughter
  - Fifth son: Imperial Prince Priest Son'en (尊円法親王; 1298-1356)
- Fujiwara Shigemichi’s daughter
  - Seventh Son: Imperial Prince Priest Sonki (尊凞法親王)
- Court Lady: Kasuga-no-Tsubone (春日局)
  - Second Son: Imperial Prince Priest E’jo (恵助法親王; 1289-1328)
- Court Lady: Nishi-no-Kata (西御方)
  - Eighth Son: Imperial Prince Priest Seijin (聖珍法親王)

His name comes from the palace of the Jimyōin-tō.

== Biography ==
Hirohito-shinnō was named Crown Prince and heir to his first cousin, the Daikakuji-tō Emperor Go-Uda. Political maneuvering by Fushimi's father, the Jimyōin-tō Emperor Go-Fukakusa, was a crucial factor in this choice.

In the year 1287 (Kōan 10, 10th month), in the 13th year of Go-Uda-tennō's reign (後宇多天皇十三年), the emperor abdicated; and the succession (senso) was received by his cousin. Shortly thereafter, Emperor Fushimi is said to have acceded to the throne (sokui).

After this, there was a short period of time in which the two lines alternated power. Two years later, the retired Emperor Go-Fukakusa ended his reign as Cloistered Emperor, and Fushimi took direct control.

In 1289, by making his own son (the future Emperor Go-Fushimi) Crown Prince, he increased the antagonism of the Daikakuji line. In 1290, the family of Asawara Tameyori made an assassination attempt on the Emperor.

During his reign, efforts were made by the noble families to defeat the government, but the power of the Bakufu increased. In 1298, Fushimi abdicated and began his reign as cloistered emperor. Three years later, in 1301, the Daikakuji Line rallied and forced Emperor Go-Fushimi to abdicate.

In 1308, his co-operation with the Bakufu succeeding, his fourth son's enthronement as Emperor Hanazono took place, and he again became cloistered Emperor.

During Fushimi's reign, the alternating plan for the Daikakuji and Jimyōin lines had not yet come into being, and the two lines fought each other for the throne.

- 1313 (Shōwa 2, 10th month): Retired Emperor Fushimi shaved his head and became a Buddhist monk; and the power to administer the court of reigning Emperor Hanazono shifted to his adopted son, former-Emperor Go-Fushimi.

In 1317, former-Emperor Fushimi died; but his son, Emperor Hanazono, did not participate in formal mourning rites for him. This was unprecedented; but this was rationalized with the explanation that Hanozono had become the adopted "son" of his older brother, former-Emperor Go-Fushimi. Fushimi is enshrined with other emperors at the imperial tomb called Fukakusa no kita no misasagi (深草北陵) in Fushimi-ku, Kyoto.

=== Kugyō ===
Kugyō (公卿) is a collective term for the very few most powerful men attached to the court of the Emperor of Japan in pre-Meiji eras. Even during those years in which the court's actual influence outside the palace walls was minimal, the hierarchic organization persisted.

In general, this elite group included only three to four men at a time. These were hereditary courtiers whose experience and background would have brought them to the pinnacle of a life's career. During Fushimi's reign, this apex of the Daijō-kan included:

- Kampaku, Nijō Morotada, 1287–1289
- Kampaku, Konoe Iemoto, 1289–1291
- Kampaku, Kujō Tadanori, 1291–1293
- Kampaku, Konoe Iemoto, 1293–1296
- Kampaku, Takatsukasa Kanetada, 1296–1298
- Sadaijin
- Udaijin
- Nadaijin
- Dainagon

== Eras of Fushimi's reign ==
The years of Fushimi's reign are more specifically identified by more than one era name or nengō.

- Kōan (1278–1288)
- Shōō (1288–1293)
- Einin (1293–1299)

== Ancestry ==
Ancestors of Emperor Fushimi

8. Emperor Tsuchimikado (1196-1231)
4. Emperor Go-Saga (1220-1272)
9. Minamoto no Michiko (d. 1221)
2. Emperor Go-Fukakusa (1243-1304)
10. Saionji Saneuji (1194-1269)
5. Fujiwara no Kitsushi (1225-1292)
11. Shijō Sadako (1196-1302)
1. Emperor Fushimi
12.Saionji Kintsune (1171-1244)
6. Tōin Saneo (1219-1273)
13.Taira
3. Tōin Inshi (1246-1329)
14.Fujiwara no Takafusa (1148-1209)
7. Fujiwara Kurako

== See also ==
- Fujiwara no Tamekane, Chūnagon
- Emperor of Japan
- List of Emperors of Japan
- Imperial cult

== Notes ==
Japanese Imperial kamon — a stylized chrysanthemum blossom

Regnal titles
Preceded by Emperor Go-Uda	Emperor of Japan: Fushimi; 1287–1298	Succeeded by Emperor Go-Fushimi
