= Shōwa (1312–1317) =

Period of Japanese history (1312–1317 CE)

Shōwa 正和
- March 1312 – February 1317
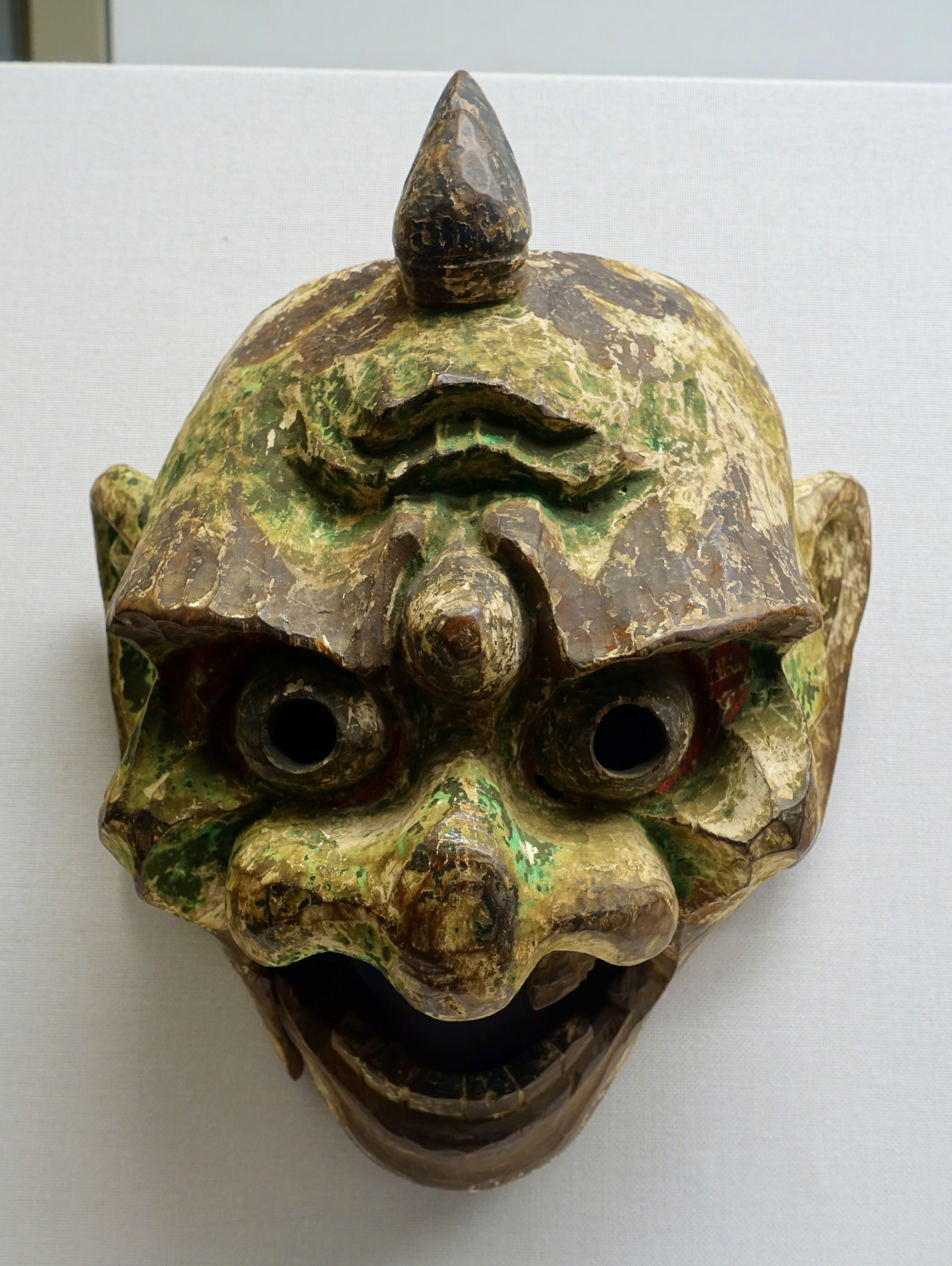
- Tsuina mask depicting an oni, dated to 1313.
- Location: Japan
- Monarch(s): Emperor Hanazono

Shōwa (正和) or Medieval Showa was a Japanese era name (年号, nengō, lit. "year number") after Ōchō and before Bunpō. This period spanned the years from March 1312 through February 1317. The reigning emperor was Hanazono-tennō (花園天皇).

== Etymology ==
The era name is derived from the Old Book of Tang, a Classical Chinese work composed in AD 941–945. The first character is shō (正), meaning "proper, straight, true", while 和 (wa) means "peace," and may also pun on Wa (倭), an ancient name for Japan. The era name is pronounced like the Shōwa era of 1926–1989, but that era name is written with the character 昭 ("illustrious") for shō.

== Change of era ==
- 1311 Shōwa gannen (正和元年): The new era name was created to mark an event or series of events. The previous era ended and the new one commenced in Ōchō 2.

== Events of the Shōwa era ==
Initially, former-Emperor Fushimi administered the court up through the time he took the tonsure as a Buddhist monk.

- 1313 (Shōwa 2, 10th month): Retired Emperor Fushimi shaved his head and became a Buddhist monk; and the power to administer the court of reigning Emperor Hanazono shifted to his adopted son, former-Emperor Go-Fushimi.
- 1314 (Shōwa 3, 11th month): Hōjō Sadaaki ended his role at Rokuhara Tandai in Kyoto; and he returned to Kamakura.
- 1315 (Shōwa 4, 7th month): Hōjō Hirotoki dies in Kamakura; and initially, Hōjō Sadaaki and Hōjō Mototoki share power.
- 1315 (Shōwa 4, 10th month): Hōjō Tokiatsu assumes the role of Rokuhara Tandai in the capital city.
- 1316 (Shōwa 5, 7th month): Hōjō Tokiatsu, who is the son of Hōjō Sadaaki, takes on the role of Shikken; and Hōjō Mototoki retires to a Buddhist monastery where he shaves his head.

== Notes ==
| Preceded by Ōchō | Era of Japan; Shōwa (正和); 1312–1317 | Succeeded by Bunpō |
