= Nijō Kanemoto =

Japanese noble (1268–1334)

Nijō Kanemoto (二条 兼基; 1268–1334), son of regent Nijō Yoshizane and adopted son of Nijō Morotada, was a Japanese kugyō (court noble) of the Kamakura period (1185–1333) of Japan. He held regent positions sesshō in 1298 and kampaku from 1300 to 1305. Regent Nijō Michihira was his son born by a concubine. His wife was a daughter of regent Kujō Tadanori; she gave birth to a son who was adopted by the Imakōji family and became known as Imakōji Yoshifuyu, and a daughter who later married Kujō Fusazane.
