= Tokuji =

Period of Japanese history (1307–1308 CE)

Tokuji 徳治
- December 1306 – October 1308
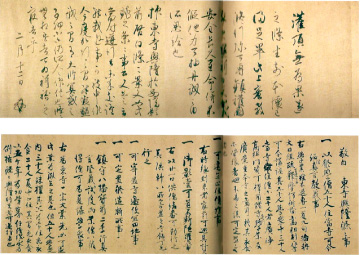
- Letter written by the former Emperor Go-Uda in February 1308, praying for the prosperity of Tō-ji temple.
- Location: Japan
- Monarch(s): Emperor Go-Nijō (to September 1308); Emperor Hanazono (from September 1308)

Tokuji (徳治) was a Japanese era name (年号, nengō, lit. "year name") after Kagen and before Enkyō. This period spanned the years from December 1306 through October 1308. The reigning emperor was Go-Nijō-tennō (後二条天皇).

== Change of era ==
- 1306 Tokuji gannen (徳治元年): The new era name was created to timestamp events or series of events. The previous era ended and the new one commenced in Kagen 4. The era name is derived from the Zuo Zhuan (4th century BC) and combines the characters 徳 ("benevolence, virtue") and 治 ("govern, reign").

== Events of the Tokuji era ==
- 1308 (Tokuji 3, 8th month): In the 8th year of Go-Nijo-tennō's reign (後二条天皇8年), the emperor died at the young age of 24; and the succession (senso) was received by his cousin. Shortly thereafter, Emperor Hanazono is said to have acceded to the throne (sokui).
- 1308 (Tokuji 3, 10th month): The nengō was changed to Enkyō with the accession of Emperor Hanazono.

== Notes ==
Preceded by Kagen	Era or nengō Tokuji; 1306–1308	Succeeded by Enkyō
