= Tennō Sekkan Daijin Eizukan =

Japanese emakimono in three scrolls

Tennō Sekkan Daijin Eizukan (天皇摂関大臣影図巻) is a Japanese emakimono in three scrolls. It is in the collection of the Museum of the Imperial Collections. It is traditionally attributed to Fujiwara no Tamenobu and Fujiwara no Gōshin. It is also known as Tenshi Sekkan Miei (天子摂関御影). It dates to the late Kamakura period. It is a series of picture scrolls of portraits of emperors, regents and ministers of state arranged in roughly chronological order.

== Content ==
Tennō Sekkan Daijin Eizukan, also known as Tenshi Sekkan Miei, is an emakimono in three scrolls. It includes portraits of emperors, regents and ministers of state arranged in roughly chronological order.

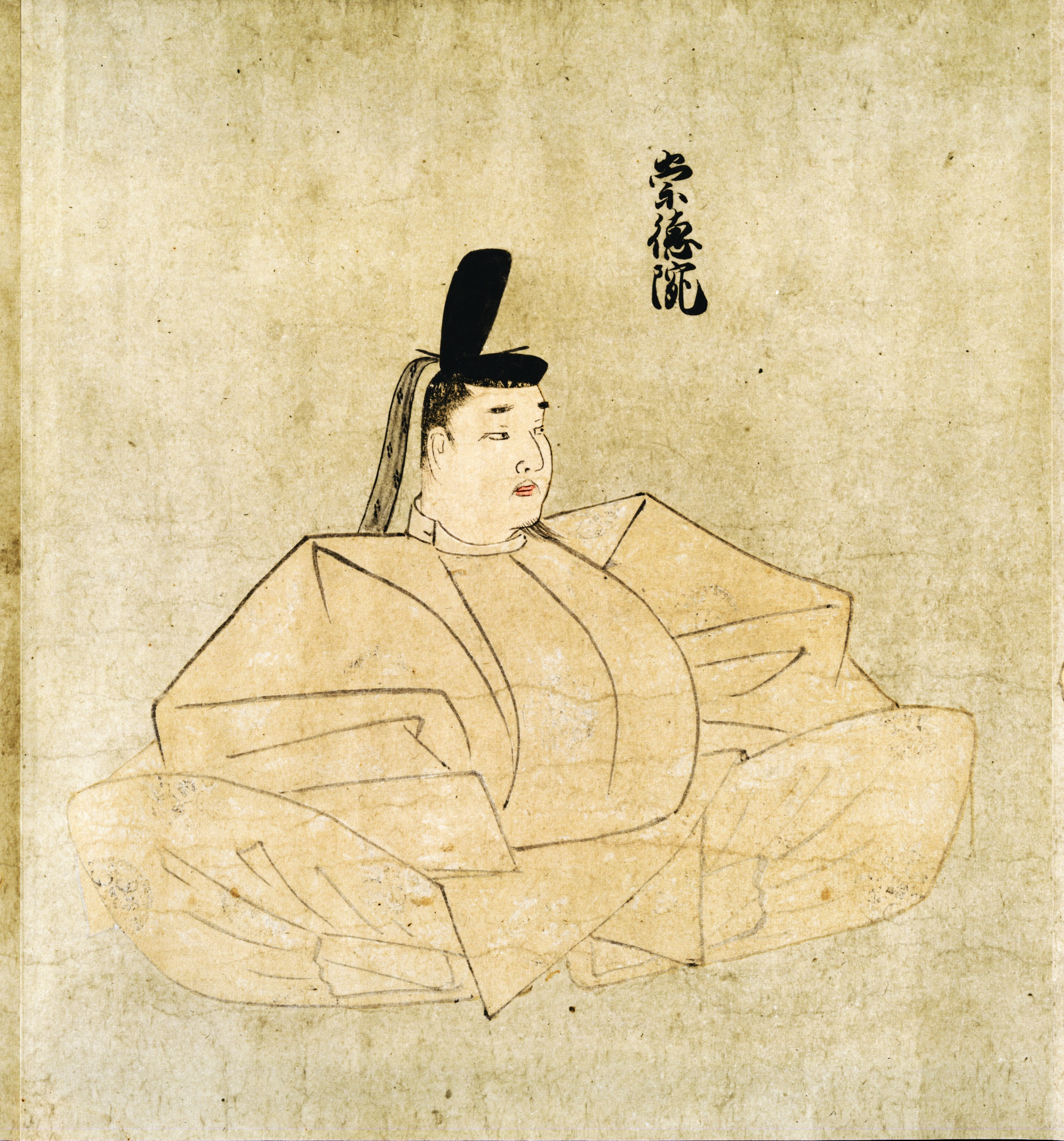
Emperor Sutoku

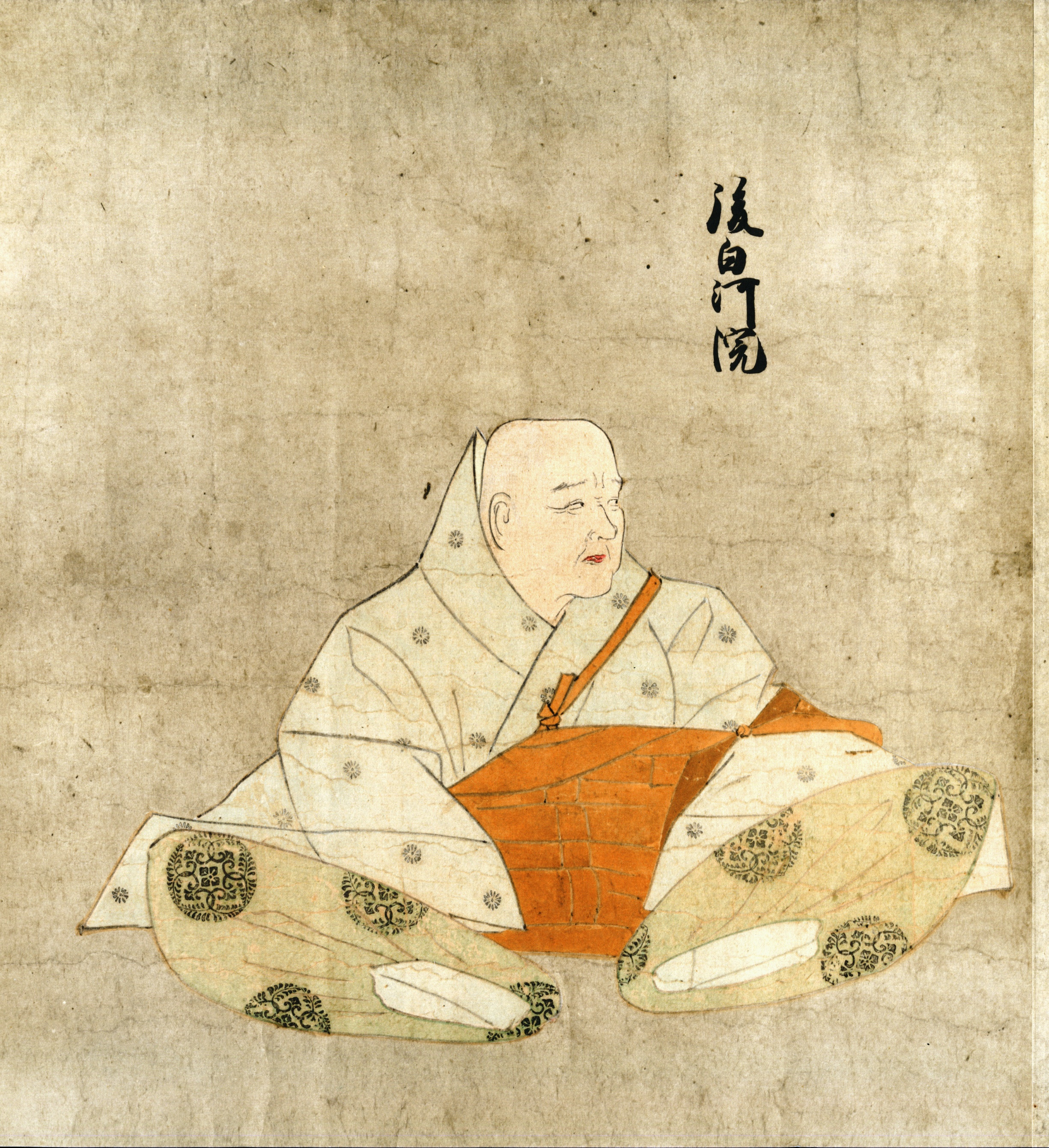
Emperor Go-Shirakawa

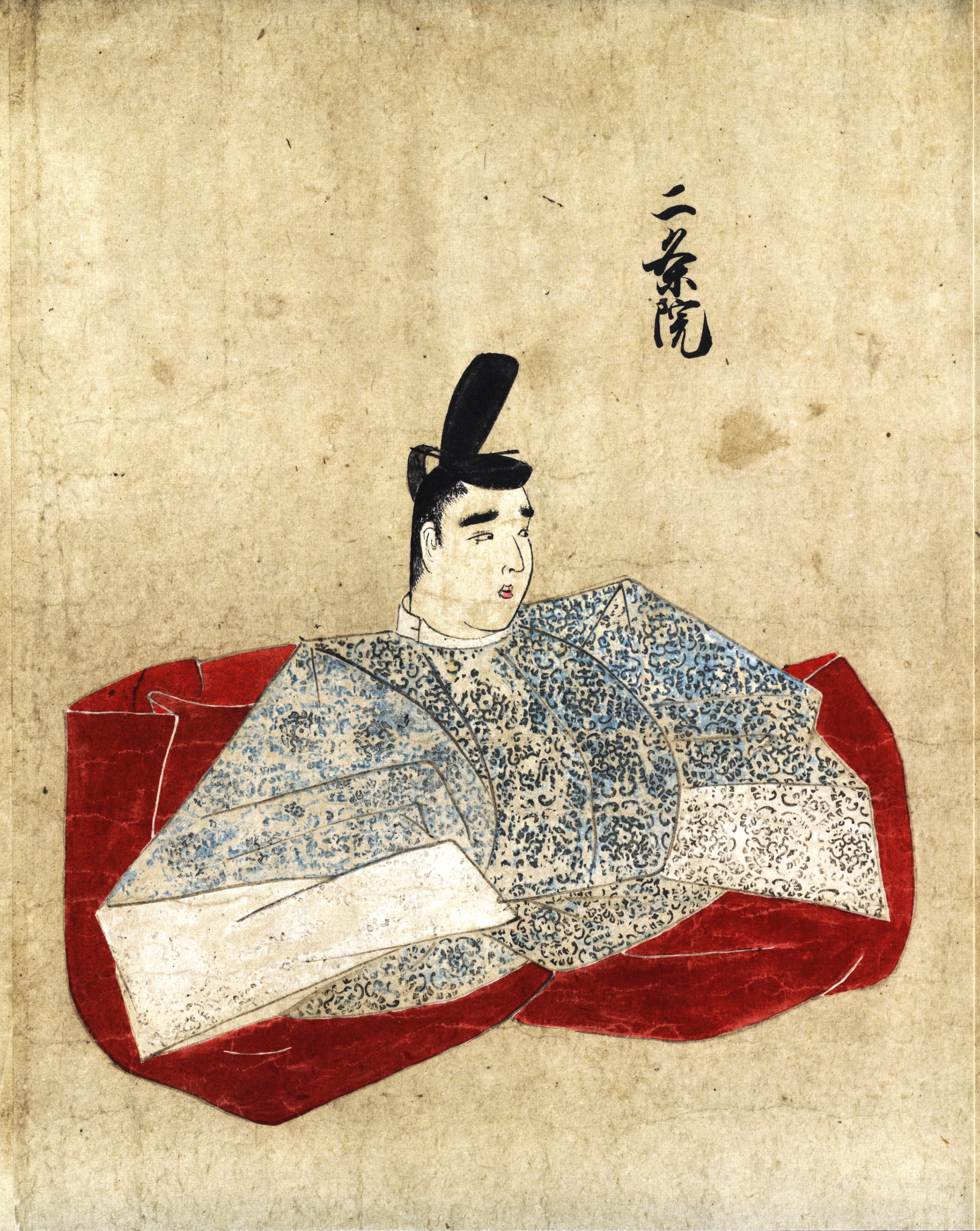
Emperor Nijō

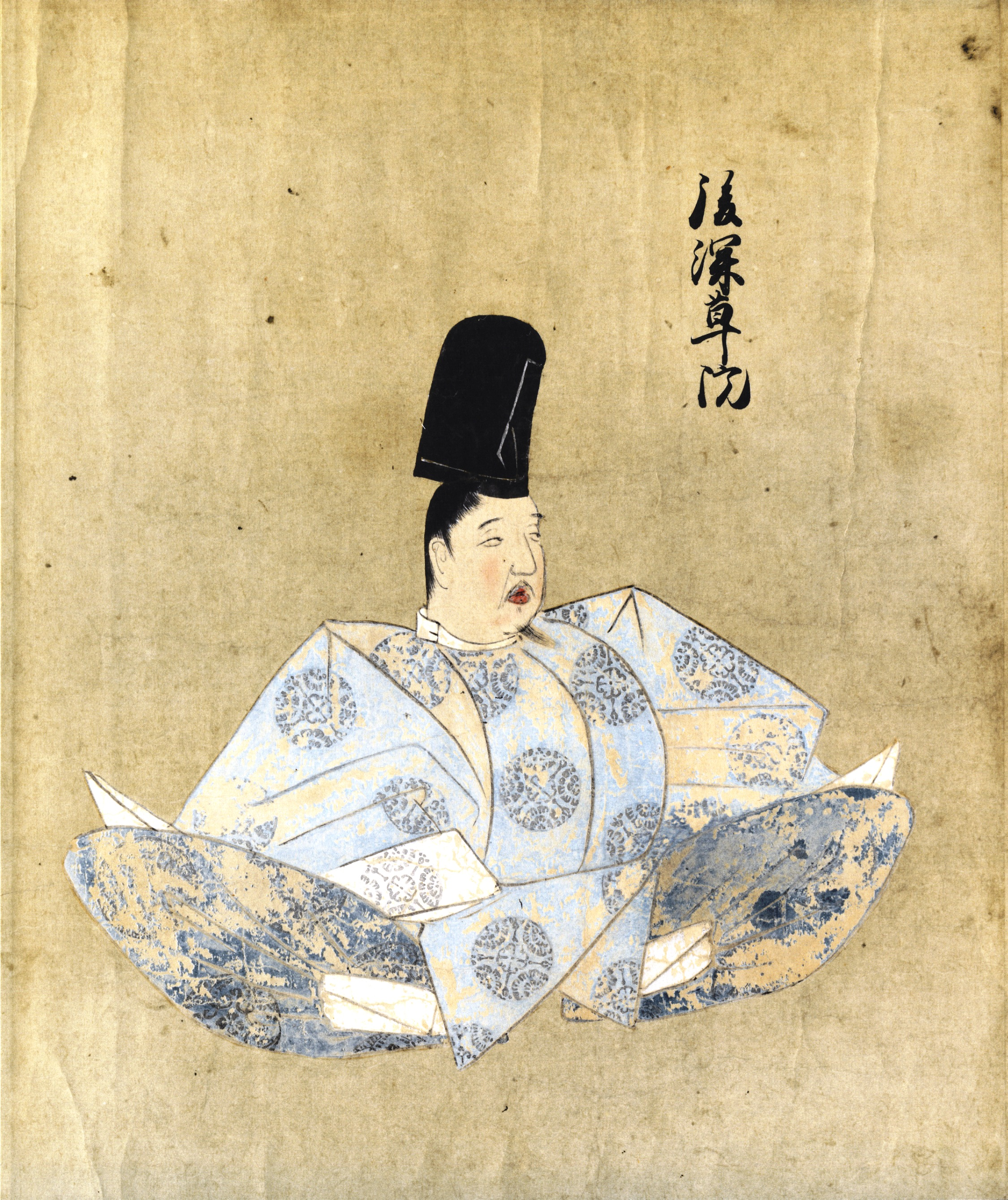
Emperor Go-Fukakusa

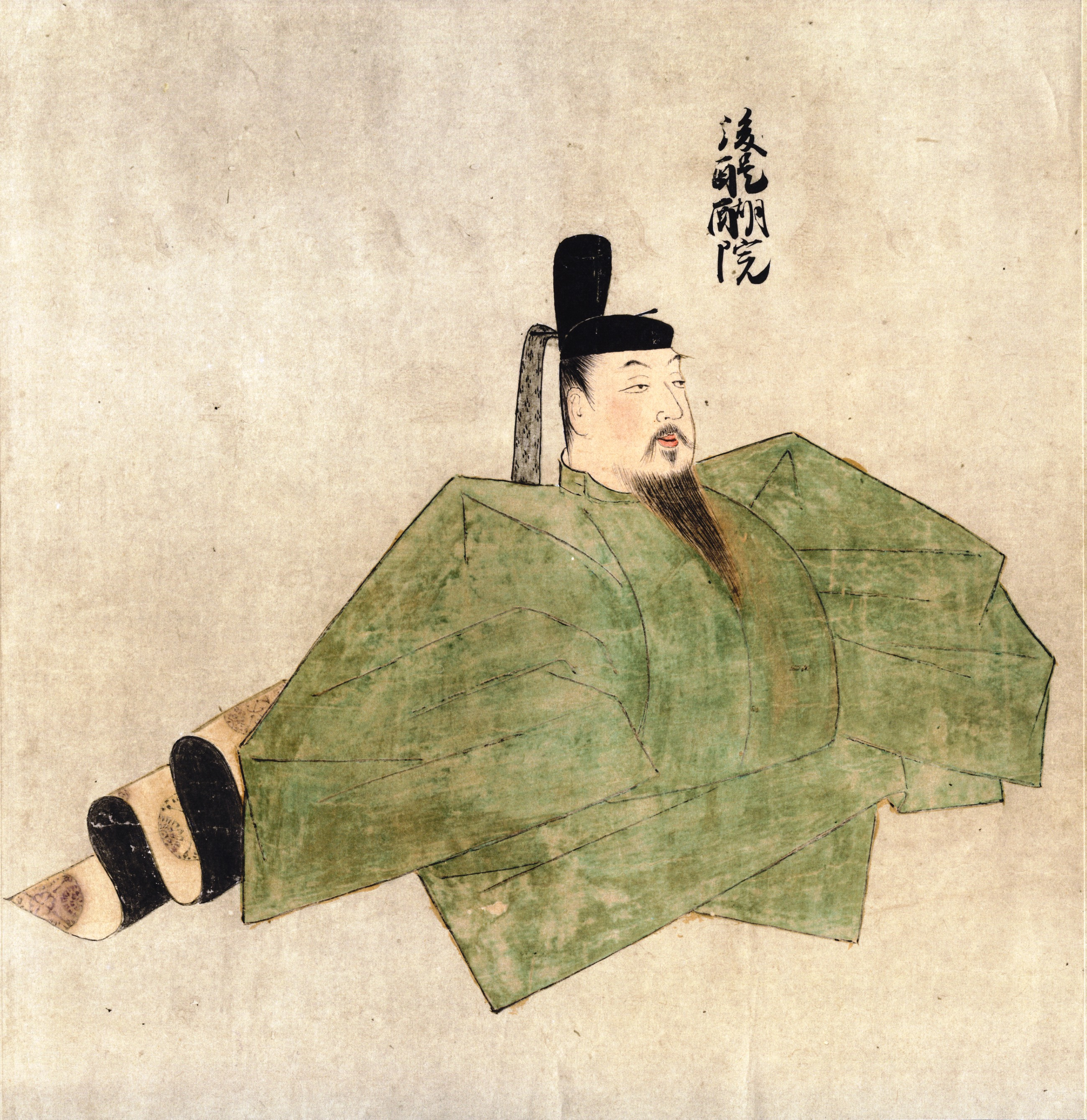
Emperor Go-Daigo

== Authorship and date ==
Tennō Sekkan Daijin Eizukan is traditionally attributed to Fujiwara no Tamenobu (藤原為信) and Fujiwara no Gōshin (藤原豪信). It dates to the late Kamakura period. The scroll exemplifies the nise-e portraiture tradition established within the Fujiwara lineage: the work of Tamenobu (1261–1306) and his nephew Goshin (1319–1348) can be observed here, and the roll has since served as a comparative reference for identifying the otherwise unlabeled courtiers depicted in the related Kuge Retsuei Zu.

== Textual tradition ==
The painting was presented to the emperor from Manshu-in in 1878, where it became part of the holdings of the Archives and Mausolea Department of the Imperial Household Agency. It is now placed in the Museum of the Imperial Collections.

According to Michio Yonemura, in his article on the work for the Nihon Koten Bungaku Daijiten, another work, the two-volume Tennō Sekkan Miei (天皇摂関御影) in the holdings of the Tokugawa Reimeikai, has many similarities to it, but the relationship remains unclear.
