= Hōjō clan =

Clan who controlled the Kamakura Shogunate as shikken (regent) in Japan

Hōjō 北条
- The emblem (mon) of the Hōjō clan
- Home province: Izu; Sagami
- Parent house: Taira clan
- Titles: Shikken; Various others
- Founder: Hōjō Tokimasa
- Final ruler: Hōjō Sadayuki
- Founding year: 12th century
- Dissolution: 1333
- Ruled until: 1333

The Hōjō clan (Japanese: 北条氏, Hepburn: Hōjō-shi) was a Japanese samurai family who controlled the hereditary title of shikken (regent) of the Kamakura shogunate between 1203 and 1333. Despite the title, in practice the family wielded actual political power in Japan during this period compared to both the Kamakura shoguns, or the Imperial Court in Kyoto, whose authority was largely symbolic. The Hōjō are known for fostering Zen Buddhism and for leading the successful opposition to the Mongol invasions of Japan. Resentment towards Hōjō rule eventually culminated in the overthrow of the clan and the establishment of the Ashikaga shogunate.

== History ==
=== Bloodline ===
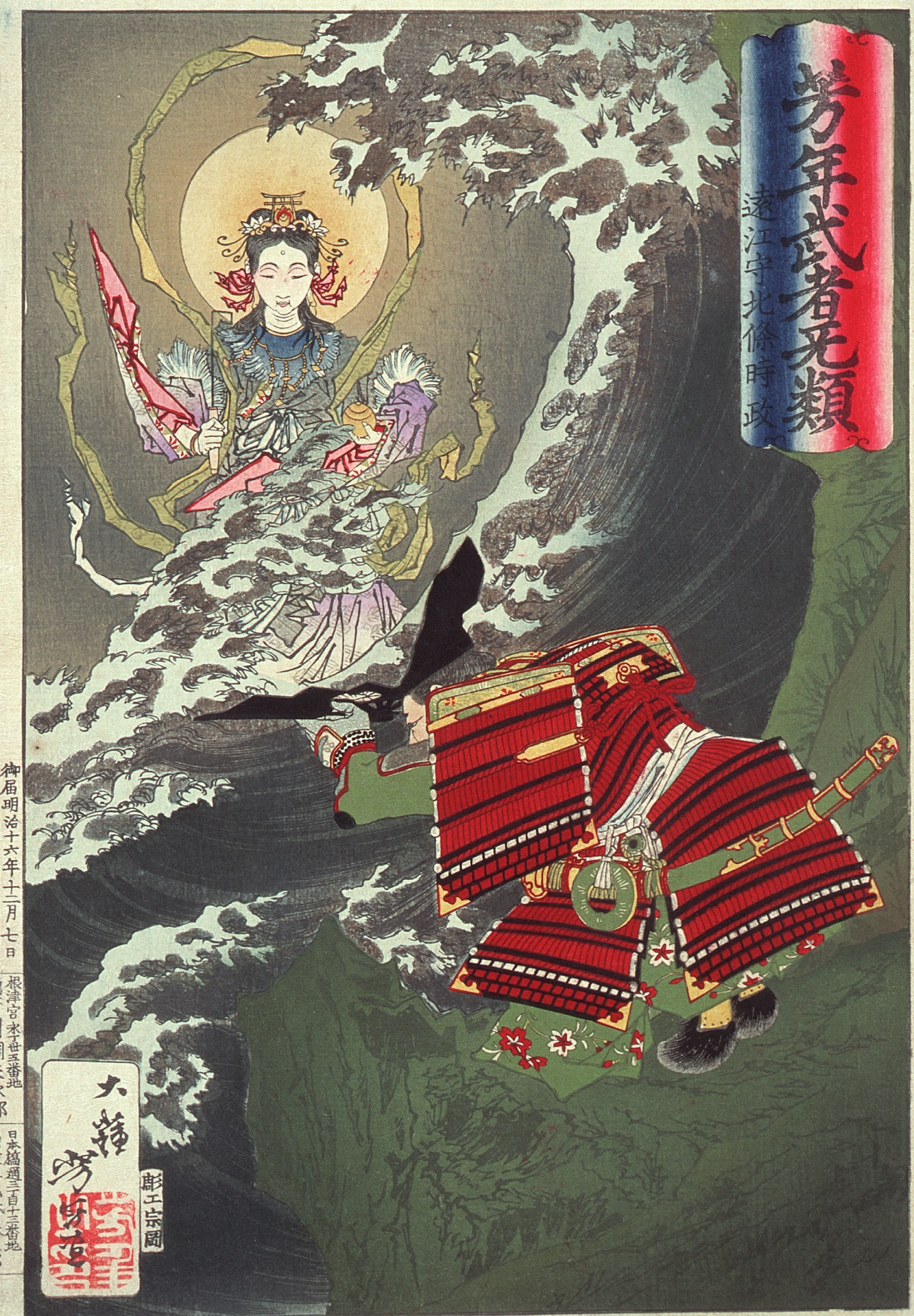
When Hojo Tokimasa went into seclusion on Enoshima Island, Benzaiten is said to have appeared on the 21st day and told him that if he committed atrocities his family would perish, then she transformed into a dragon and disappeared into the sea. This painting depicts Tokimasa bowing his head and placing the three dragonscales on a folding fan. After this, the Hojo family adopted the three scales as their family mon.

The Hōjō are alleged to have been an offshoot of the Taira of the Kanmu branch, originating in Izu Province. On the other hand, modern theories question whether the Hōjō clan was really descended from the Taira clan.

They gained power by supporting the defeat of the Taira by supporting the warlord Minamoto no Yoritomo in the Genpei War through both military assistance and by marriage to his blood relatives. Yet, when Yoritomo died eighteen years later, the Hōjō usurped power from his family.

=== Rise to power ===
Hōjō Tokimasa helped Minamoto no Yoritomo, a son-in-law, defeat the forces of the Taira to become Japan's first shōgun. Hōjō Masako, Tokimasa's daughter, was married to Yoritomo. After the death of Yoritomo, Tokimasa appointed himself as shikken (regent) to the former shōgun's young son, thus effectively transferring control of the shogunate to his clan permanently. Consequently, the shōguns became puppets and hostages of the Hōjō.

=== Early events ===
The Imperial court at Kyoto resented the decline in its authority during the Kamakura shogunate, while the clan, in turn, came to despise the weak Emperor Go-Toba. In 1221, the Jōkyū War broke out between forces loyal to the recently retired Go-Toba and the second regent Hōjō Yoshitoki. The Hōjō forces easily won the war; the imperial court was brought under the direct control of the shogunate, while the emperor was exiled to the Oki islands. The shōgun's constables were granted extensive civil powers, and the court was obliged to seek the shōgun's approval for all of its actions. Although deprived of political power, the court was permitted to maintain its estates in Kyoto since it conveyed needed legitimacy on the otherwise unlawful rule of the shogunate.

Several significant administrative achievements were made during the Hōjō regency. In 1225 the third regent, Hōjō Yasutoki, established the Hyōjōsho (Council of State), which ended the threat of civil war by enabling potential rivals of the Hōjō to share in the shogunate's decision-making and political power. The Hōjō regent presided over the council, which was a successful form of collective leadership. The adoption of Japan's first military code of law — the Goseibai Shikimoku — in 1232 reflected the profound transition from an era of direct Imperial rule to the rule of the shōgun. While legal practices in Kyoto were still based on 500-year-old Confucian principles, the new code was a highly legalistic document that stressed the duties of stewards and constables, provided means for settling land disputes, and established rules governing inheritances. It was clear and concise, stipulated punishments for violators of its conditions, and remained in effect for the next 635 years.

== List of Hōjō Shikken ==
1. Hōjō Tokimasa (1138–1215) (r. 1203–1205)
2. Hōjō Yoshitoki (1163–1224) (r. 1205–1224)
3. Hōjō Yasutoki (1183–1242) (r. 1224–1242)
4. Hōjō Tsunetoki (1224–1246) (r. 1242–1246)
5. Hōjō Tokiyori (1227–1263) (r. 1246–1256)
6. Hōjō Nagatoki (1229–1264) (r. 1256–1264)
7. Hōjō Masamura (1205–1273) (r. 1264–1268)
8. Hōjō Tokimune (1251–1284) (r. 1268–1284)
9. Hōjō Sadatoki (1271–1311) (r. 1284–1301)
10. Hōjō Morotoki (1275–1311) (r. 1301–1311)
11. Hōjō Munenobu (1259–1312) (r. 1311–1312)
12. Hōjō Hirotoki (1279–1315) (r. 1312–1315)
13. Hōjō Mototoki (1286-1333) (r. 1315)
14. Hōjō Takatoki (1303–1333) (r. 1316–1326)
15. Hōjō Sadaaki (1278–1333) (r. 1326)
16. Hōjō Moritoki (1295-1333) (r. 1327–1333)
17. Hōjō Sadayuki (1302-1333) (r.1333)

Aside from the regents above, those who played an important role among the Hōjō clan are:

- Hōjō Sanetoki
- Hōjō Masako

== References in media ==
- The Taiheiki (Japanese: 太平記) is a Japanese historical epic written in the late 14th century that details the fall of the Hōjō clan and rise of the Ashikaga, and the period of war (Nanboku-chō) between the Northern Court of Ashikaga Takauji in Kyoto, and the Southern Court of Emperor Go-Daigo in Yoshino, which forever splintered the Japanese Imperial Family. Multiple modern films have been made based on the epic novel.
- In the visual novel Policenauts, the main plot deals with protagonist Jonathan Ingram locating his estranged wife's missing husband, Kenzō Hōjō. Hōjō's crest becomes an important gameplay element later on
- Hōjō Tokimune is the leader of the Japanese civilization in the strategy video game Sid Meier's Civilization VI.
- Hōjō Tokiyuki, a son of the last Tokusō (head of Hōjō clan), is the main character of The Elusive Samurai (逃げ上手の若君) manga by Yusei Matsui.
- The design of the triforce in the Legend of Zelda series is derived from the Hōjō clan's distinctive three dragon-scale mon.

== See also ==
- History of Japan
- Hōkoku-ji
- Kamakura shogunate
- Kanazawa Bunko
- Later Hōjō clan, a clan that took on the name 'Hōjō' for the convenience of ruling over the Kanto region, despite having no direct connection to the Kamakura Hōjō.
- Mongol invasions of Japan
- Rensho, Hōjō hereditary post
- Rokuhara Tandai, security force located in Kyoto, Hōjō hereditary post
- Shikken, Hōjō hereditary post
- Tokusō, the title of the head of the clan
