= Kanezawa Sanetoki =

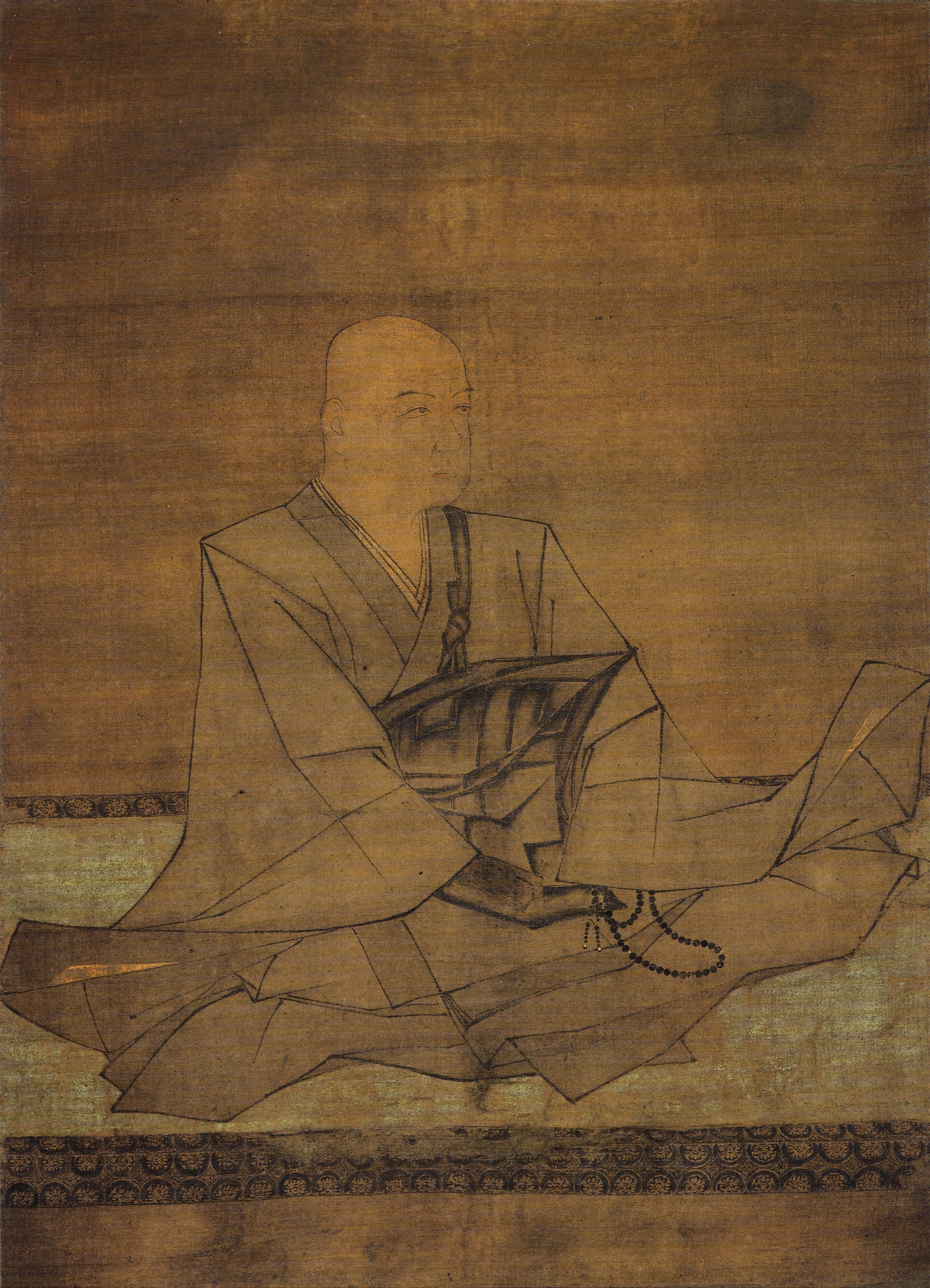
Kanezawa Sanetoki

Kanezawa Sanetoki (金沢 実時), also called Hōjō Sanetoki (北条 実時, 1224 – November 30, 1276) was the founder of the Kanazawa Bunko (Kanazawa Library). He was a member of the Kanezawa branch of the Hōjō clan. He may have been married to Mugai Nyodai.

He was born to Hōjō Saneyasu in 1224. As his talent was discovered by his uncle Hōjō Yasutoki, Sanetoki was given important posts by four shikken: Yasutoki, Tsunetoki, Tokiyori and Tokimune. He began his career as the head of Kosamurai-dokoro in 1234 and then became Hikitsukeshu in 1252 and Hyojoshu in 1253. Due to illness, he resigned from all posts and took a rest at his residence at Kanezawa (modern-day Kanazawa), Yokohama.

While attending to government affairs, he was dedicated himself to study. He studied under Kiyohara no Noritaka, who came to Kamakura in Prince Munetaka's retinue. In 1258 he established a temple called Shōmyōji at Kanazawa and put a library within the temple to house his huge manuscript collection.
