= Hōjō Shigetoki =

Hōjō Shigetoki may refer to:

- Hōjō Shigetoki (born 1198) (北条重時), rensho from 1247 to 1256
- Hōjō Shigetoki (born 1241) (北条業時), rensho from 1283 to 1287
- Hōjō Shigetoki (born 1303) (北条茂時), rensho from 1330 to 1333
