= Hikitsuke =

The Hikitsuke (引付 lit. enquiry) or Hikitsuke-kata (引付方) (High Court) was one of the judicial organs of the Kamakura and Muromachi shogunates of Japan.

The Hikitsuke was established by the fifth shikken Hōjō Tokiyori in 1249 to expedite an increasing number of lawsuits in the higher Hyojosho court. The Hikitsuke was responsible for establishing the facts of a case, while the Hyojosho would interpret the applications of law.

The Hikitsuke had three, and later five, tribunals; each tribunal was operated by four or five Hikitsukeshū (引付衆 adjusters), whose head was called a Tōnin (頭人), with four or five Bugyōnin (奉行人 secretaries).

The Hikitsuke's power increased gradually. At first the Hikitsuke just drafted several verdicts after hearings and submitted them to the Hyojoshu. Submitting only one verdict per lawsuit, the Hikitsuke later became a de facto full law court. It originally processed only conflicts of the vassals of the shogunate, but later treated more general cases.

Although it aimed at accelerating trials and making them fair, the Hikitsuke tended to make rough-and-ready decisions in the late Kamakura period. The Hikitsukeshu were mostly occupied by the Hōjō clan. In addition, the Hikitsukeshu and Hyojoshu lost effective power to the yoriai, which was held at tokuso's residence.

The Muromachi shogunate took over the system of Hikitsuke, but it lost its substantial meaning after Ashikaga Tadayoshi died, who controlled the Hikitsuke.
