= Hōjō Masamura =

7th Shikken of the Kamakura shogunate

Hōjō Masamura 北条 政村
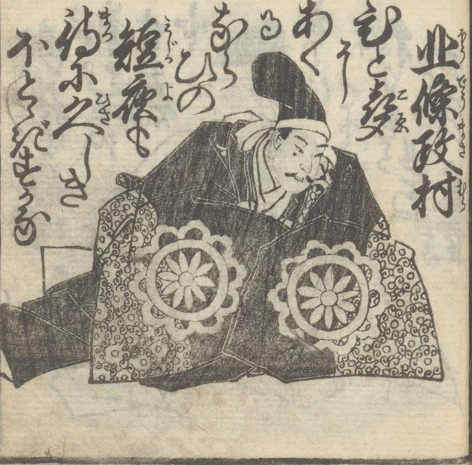

Shikken
- In office 1264–1268
- Monarch: Kameyama
- Shōgun: Prince Munetaka; Minamoto no Koreyasu
- Rensho: Hōjō Tokimune
- Preceded by: Hōjō Nagatoki
- Succeeded by: Hōjō Tokimune

Rensho
- In office 1256–1264
- Preceded by: Shigetoki
- Succeeded by: Hōjō Tokimune
- In office 1268–1273
- Preceded by: Hōjō Tokimune
- Succeeded by: Hōjō Yoshimasa

Personal details
- Born: July 10, 1205
- Died: June 13, 1273 (aged 67)
- Children: Hōjō Tokimura; Hōjō Masanaga; Hōjō Masayori; Hōjō Munefusa; Hōjō Masakata; five daughters
- Parents: Hōjō Yoshitoki (father); Iga no Kata (mother)

Hōjō Masamura (北条 政村; July 10, 1205 – June 13, 1273) was the seventh Shikken (regent) of the Kamakura Shogunate, regining from 1264 to 1268. He was the son of Hōjō Yoshitoki, the second Shikken, and brother of Hōjō Yasutoki and Hōjō Shigetoki.

== Life ==
Hōjō Masamura was born on July 10, 1205, the son of Shikken Hōjō Yoshitoki. His mother was the daughter of Iga Tomomitsu. Shikken Hōjō Yasutoki was his half brother. Masamura was born on the day Hatakeyama Shigetada was killed. Masamura held his genpuku, coming of age ceremony, in 1213.

Before his regency, he served as Captain of the Right Division of Bureau of Horses (uma no gon no kami), Governor of Mutsu Province, and Mayor of the Left Capital District (Sakyō no gon no daibu).

After the sudden death of Yoshitoki, Masamura's mother and his elder brother, steward of the Mandokoro Iga Mitsumune, conspired to replace shogun Kujō Yoritsune with his son-in-law, associate counselor Ichijō Sanemasa, as shogun, and to make Masamura the next shikken. The plan failed, but Masamura was pardoned by his half-brother Yasutoki and was not punished.

In 1239, Masamura became a member of the Council of the Shogunate (hyōjōshū). In 1249, he became the head of the newly established High Court of the Shogunate (hikitsuke).

In 1256, he was appointed rensho, and assisted the shikken Hōjō Tokiyori and Nagatoki.

In 1264, Nagatoki resigned due to illness, and Masamura became the seventh shikken. Hōjō Tokimune subsequently became his rensho.

During Masamura's reign, Prince Munetaka was removed from the post of shogun and Prince Koreyasu was appointed as the seventh shogun. Masamura and Tokimune are thought to have played a central role in this change of power.

In 1268, Masamura stepped down to the post of rensho, and gave the post of shikken to Tokimune, who had grown up. Tokimune, who reigned during the difficult time preceding the Mongol invasions of Japan in 1274 and 1281, is said to have been frequently aided by Masamura.

Masamura fell ill in 1273, and entered the priesthood, taking the Buddhist name Kakusū. He died shortly after on June 13, 1273.

== Popular culture ==
- In the 40th taiga drama Hōjō Tokimune (2001), Masamura was played by veteran actor Shirō Itō.
- In the 61st taiga drama The 13 Lords of the Shogun (2022), Masamura was played by the Newcomer actor Taisuke Niihara.

Preceded by Hōjō Nagatoki	Hōjō Regent (Shikken); 1264–1268	Succeeded by Hōjō Tokimune
Preceded by Hōjō Shigetoki	Rensho; 1256–1264	Succeeded by Hōjō Tokimune
Preceded by Hōjō Tokimune	Rensho; 1268–1273	Succeeded by Hōjō Yoshimasa
