= Hōjō Morotoki =

10th Shikken of the Kamakura shogunate

Hōjō Morotoki 北条 師時
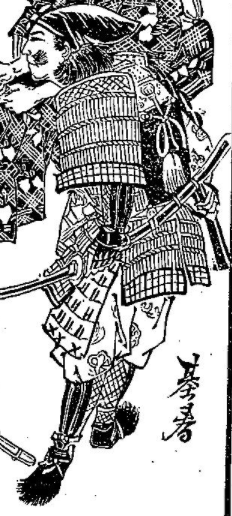
- Hōjō Morotoki in Hōjō Kudaiki

Shikken
- In office September 24, 1301 – November 3, 1311
- Monarchs: Go-Nijō; Hanazono
- Shōgun: Prince Hisaaki; Prince Morikuni
- Rensho: Hōjō Tokimura; Hōjō Munenobu
- Preceded by: Hōjō Sadatoki
- Succeeded by: Hōjō Munenobu

Personal details
- Born: 1275
- Died: November 3, 1311
- Spouse: daughter of Hōjō Sadatoki
- Children: Hōjō Tokimochi; Hōjō Sadanori
- Parents: Hōjō Munemasa (father); daughter of Hōjō Masamura (mother)

Hōjō Morotoki (北条 師時; 1275? – November 3, 1311) was the tenth Shikken (1301–1311) of the Kamakura shogunate.

Preceded by Hōjō Sadatoki	Hōjō Regent; 1301–1311	Succeeded by Hōjō Munenobu
