= Appeal =

Legal request to have a case reviewed by a higher authority

In law, an appeal is the process in which cases or decisions are reviewed by a higher authority, where parties request a formal change to an official decision. Appeals function both as a process for error correction as well as a process of clarifying and interpreting law. Although appellate courts have existed for thousands of years, common law countries did not incorporate an affirmative right to appeal into their jurisprudence until the 19th century.

== Terminology ==
"Appellate review" is the general term for the process by which courts with appellate jurisdiction exercise jurisdiction over matters decided by lower courts. It is distinguished from judicial review, which refers to the court's overriding constitutional or statutory right to determine whether a legislative act or administrative decision is defective for jurisdictional or other reasons (which may vary by jurisdiction).

American English and British English have diverged significantly on the topic of appellate terminology. American cases go up "on appeal" and one "appeals from" (intransitive) or "appeals" (transitive) an order, award, judgment, or conviction, while decisions of British courts are said to be "under appeal" and one "appeals against" a judgment. An American court disposes of an appeal with words like "judgment affirmed" (the appeal is without merit) or "judgment reversed" (the appeal has merit), while a British court disposes of an appeal with words like "appeal dismissed" (the appeal is without merit) or "appeal allowed" (the appeal has merit).

In most jurisdictions the normal and preferred way of seeking appellate review is by filing an appeal against the lower court's judgment.

== History ==
Appellate courts and other systems of error correction have existed for many millennia. During the first dynasty of Babylon, Hammurabi and his governors served as the highest appellate courts of the land. Ancient Roman law recognized the right to appeal in the Valerian and Porcian laws since 509 BC. Later it employed a complex hierarchy of appellate courts, where some appeals would be heard by the emperor. Additionally, appellate courts have existed in Japan since at least the Kamakura shogunate (1185–1333). During this time, the shogunate established hikitsuke, a high appellate court to aid the state in adjudicating lawsuits.

Although some scholars argue that "the right to appeal is itself a substantive liberty interest", the notion of a right to appeal is a relatively recent advent in common law jurisdictions. Commentators have observed that common law jurisdictions were particularly "slow to incorporate a right to appeal into either its civil or criminal jurisprudence".

The idea of an appeal from court to court (as distinguished from court directly to the Crown) was unheard of in early English courts. English common law courts eventually developed the writs of error and certiorari as routes to appellate relief, but both types of writs were severely limited in comparison to modern appeals in terms of availability, scope of review, and remedies afforded. For example, writs of error were originally not available as a matter of right and were issued only upon the recommendation of the attorney general (which was initially discretionary but by modern times was regularly granted). Certiorari was originally available only for summary offences; in the early 19th century, certiorari became available for indictable offences, but only to obtain relief before judgment. Due to widespread dissatisfaction with writs (resulting in the introduction of at least 28 separate bills in Parliament), England switched over to appeals in civil cases in 1873, and in criminal cases in 1907.

== Appellate procedure ==
We are not final because we are infallible, but we are infallible only because we are final.

— Associate Supreme Court Justice Robert H. Jackson, discussing the Supreme Court of the United States' role as a court of last resort.

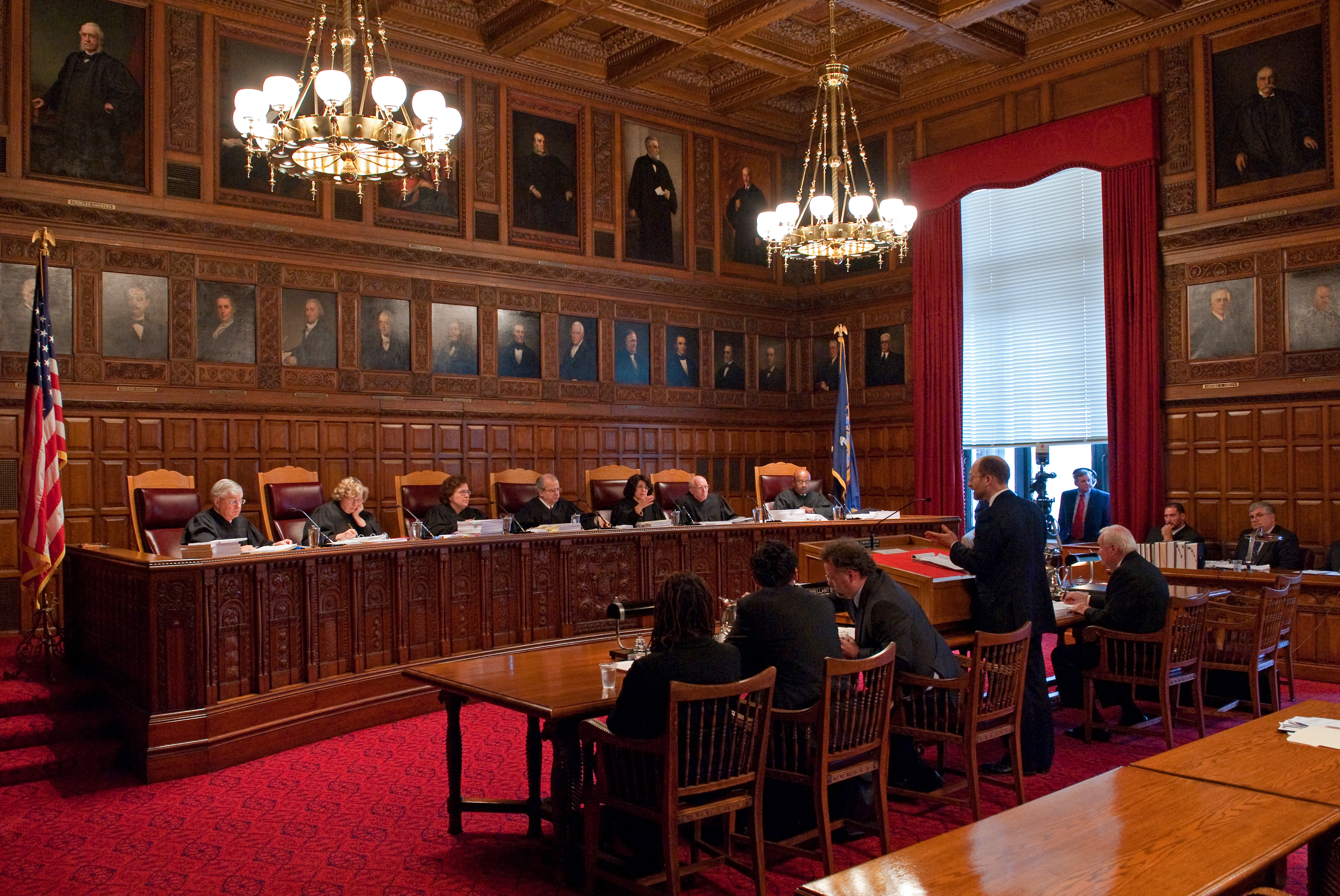
The New York Court of Appeals hears oral arguments in a 2009 case involving the Atlantic Yards development in Brooklyn.

Although some courts permit appeals at preliminary stages of litigation, most litigants appeal final orders and judgments from lower courts. A fundamental premise of many legal systems is that appellate courts review questions of law de novo, but appellate courts do not conduct independent fact-finding. Instead, appellate courts will generally defer to the record established by the trial court, unless some error occurred during the fact-finding process. In some jurisdictions on the other hand, such as the Netherlands, appellate courts review cases in their entirety, which includes fact-finding. Many jurisdictions provide a statutory or constitutional right for litigants to appeal adverse decisions. However, most jurisdictions also recognize that this right may be waived. In the United States, for example, litigants may waive the right to appeal, as long as the waiver is "considered and intelligent".

The appellate process usually begins when an appellate court grants a party's petition for review or petition for certiorari. Unlike trials, which many common law jurisdictions typically perform with a jury, appeals are generally presented to a judge, or a panel of judges. Before hearing oral argument, parties will generally submit legal briefs in which the parties present their arguments at length in writing. Appellate courts may also grant permission for an amicus curiae to submit a brief in support of a particular party or position. After submitting briefs, parties often have the opportunity to present an oral argument to a judge or panel of judges. During oral arguments, judges often ask questions to attorneys to challenge their arguments or to advance their own legal theories. After deliberating in chambers, appellate courts issue formal written opinions that resolve the legal issues presented for review.

The appeal may end with a reversal, in which the lower court's decision is found to be incorrect (resulting in the original judgement being vacated, and the lower court instructed to retry the case) or an affirmation, in which the lower court's decision is found to be correct.

== Appellate courts ==
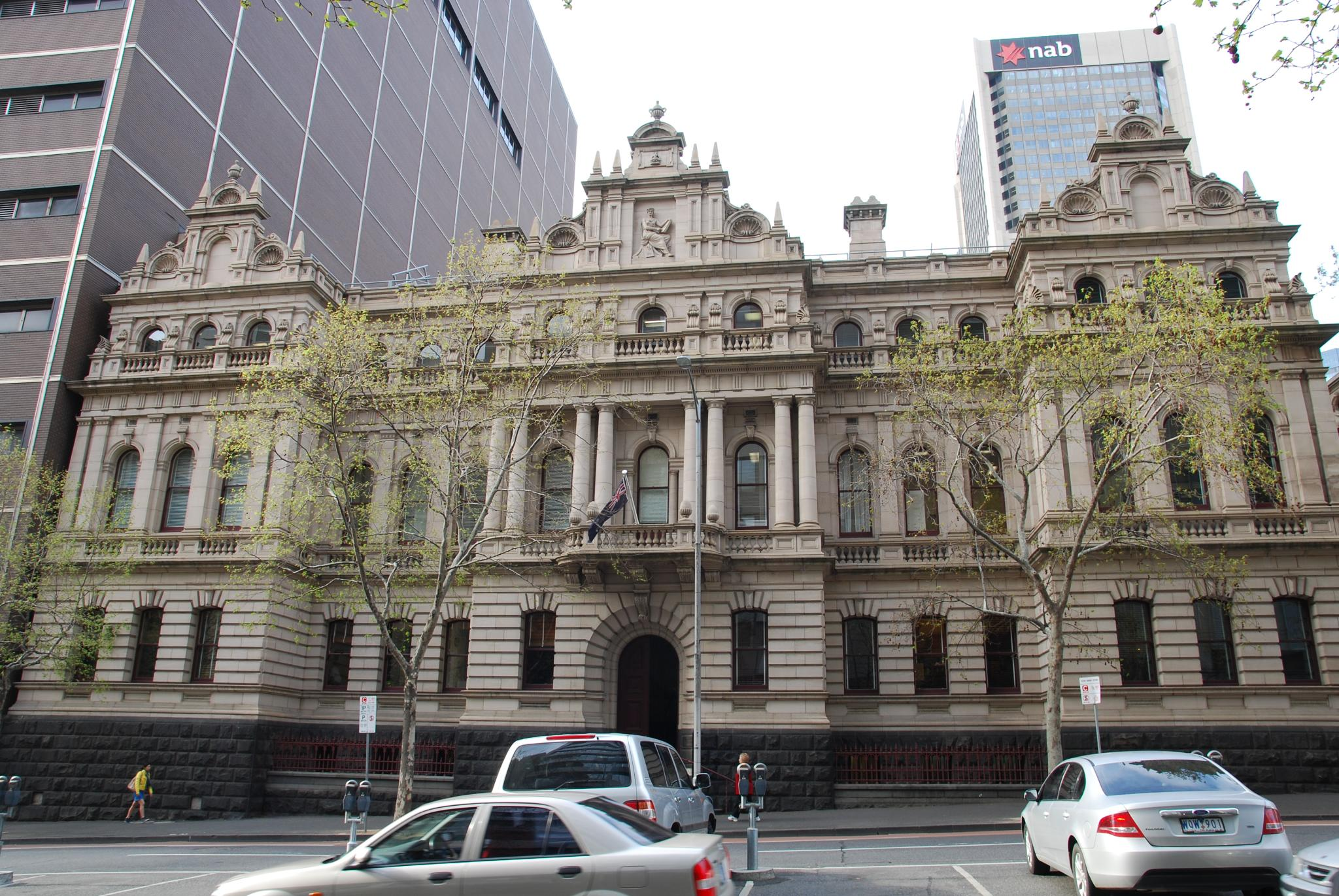
The Victorian Court of Appeal

When considering cases on appeal, appellate courts generally affirm, reverse, or vacate the decision of a lower court. Some courts maintain a dual function, where they consider both appeals and matters of "first instance". For example, the Supreme Court of the United States primarily hears cases on appeal but retains original jurisdiction over a limited range of cases. Some jurisdictions maintain a system of intermediate appellate courts, which are subject to the review of higher appellate courts. The highest appellate court in a jurisdiction is sometimes referred to as a "court of last resort" or supreme court.

== See also ==
- Appellate procedure in the United States
- Civil procedure
- Criminal appeal
- Judicial review
- List of legal topics
- Scope of review
