= Hōjō Tokifusa =

Buddhist monk and Japanese samurai of the early Kamakura period

Hōjō Tokifusa (北条 時房; 1175 – February 18, 1240) was a member of Japan's Hōjō clan of nobles and courtiers; the brother of Hōjō Yoshitoki, shogunal regent, Tokifusa was appointed to the Kyoto-based government post of Rokuhara Tandai upon its creation in 1221, following the Jōkyū War. He served alongside Hōjō Yasutoki.

He later became a Buddhist monk, and lived out the rest of his life at Tō-ji in Nara, where he acquired the nickname "Daibutsu" (Great Buddha).

Preceded by (none)	Rensho; 1225–1240	Succeeded by Hōjō Shigetoki
Preceded by (none)	Rokuhara Tandai (Minamikata); 1221–1225	Succeeded by Hōjō Tokimori
