= Prince Koreyasu =

Military ruler of Japan from 1266 to 1289

Prince Koreyasu 惟康親王

Shōgun
- In office: 26 August 1266 – 29 September 1289
- Predecessor: Prince Munetaka
- Successor: Prince Hisaaki
- Monarch: Kameyama; Go-Uda; Fushimi
- Shikken: Hōjō Masamura; Hōjō Tokimune; Hōjō Sadatoki
- Born: 26 May 1264; Kamakura, Japan
- Died: 25 November 1326 (aged 62); Heian-kyō, Japan
Names
- Prince Koreyasu (惟康王)→Minamoto no Koreyasu (源惟康)→Prince Koreyasu
- Father: Prince Munetaka
- Mother: Konoe Saishi
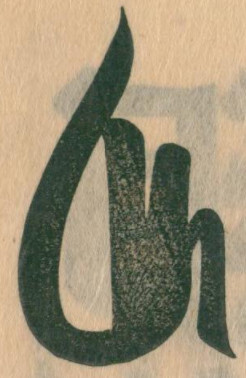
- Signature

Prince Koreyasu (惟康親王, Koreyasu Shinnō; 26 May 1264 – 25 November 1326; reigned 1266 – 1289), also known as Minamoto no Koreyasu (源 惟康), was the seventh shōgun of the Kamakura shogunate of medieval Japan. He was the nominal ruler virtually controlled by the Hōjō clan regents.

Prince Koreyasu was the son of Prince Munetaka who was the sixth shōgun.

- 26 August 1266 (Bun'ei 3, 24th day of the 7th month): Koreyasu was installed as the 7th shōgun at the age of two when his father was deposed.
- 17 July 1287 (Kōan 10, 6th day of the 6th month): The shōgun was given the offices of Chūnagon and Udaijin in the hierarchy of the Imperial court.
- 29 September 1289 (Shōō 2, 14th day of the 9th month): A revolt led by Hōjō Sadatoki (Sagami-no-Kami) caused Koreyasu to flee to Kyoto.

At age 25, the deposed shōgun became a Buddhist monk. His priestly name was Ono-no miya.

== Family ==
- Father: Prince Munetaka
- Mother: Konoe Saiko (b. 1241)
- Wife: unknown
- Children:
  - Prince Hitozumi
  - a daughter married Prince Hisaaki (d. 1306)
  - Prince Yasutada
  - Prince Hitokiyo (1291–1302)
  - Prince Hitotada
  - Prince Hisazumi
- Adopted son: Prince Hisaaki

== Eras of Koreyasu's bakufu ==
The years in which Koreyasu is shogun are more specifically identified by more than one era name or nengō.

- Bun'ei (1264–1275)
- Kenji (1275–1278)
- Kōan (1278–1288)
- Shōō (1288–1293)

== Notes ==
Preceded by Prince Munetaka	Shōgun: Prince Koreyasu; 1266–1289	Succeeded by Prince Hisaaki
