= Munetaka =

- Gender: Male

Origin
- Origin: Japanese
- Meaning: Different meanings depending on the kanji used

Munetaka (written: 宗尊, 宗堯, 宗孝, or 宗貴) is a masculine Japanese given name. Notable people with the name include:

- Prince Munetaka (宗尊親王) (1242–1274), Japanese shōgun
- Munetaka Higuchi (樋口 宗孝) (1958–2008), Japanese musician and record producer
- Tokugawa Munetaka (徳川 宗堯) (1705–1730), Japanese daimyō
- Munetaka Murakami (村上 宗隆) (born 2000), Japanese baseball player
