= Prince Munetaka =

Military ruler of Japan from 1252 to 1266

Prince Munetaka 宗尊親王
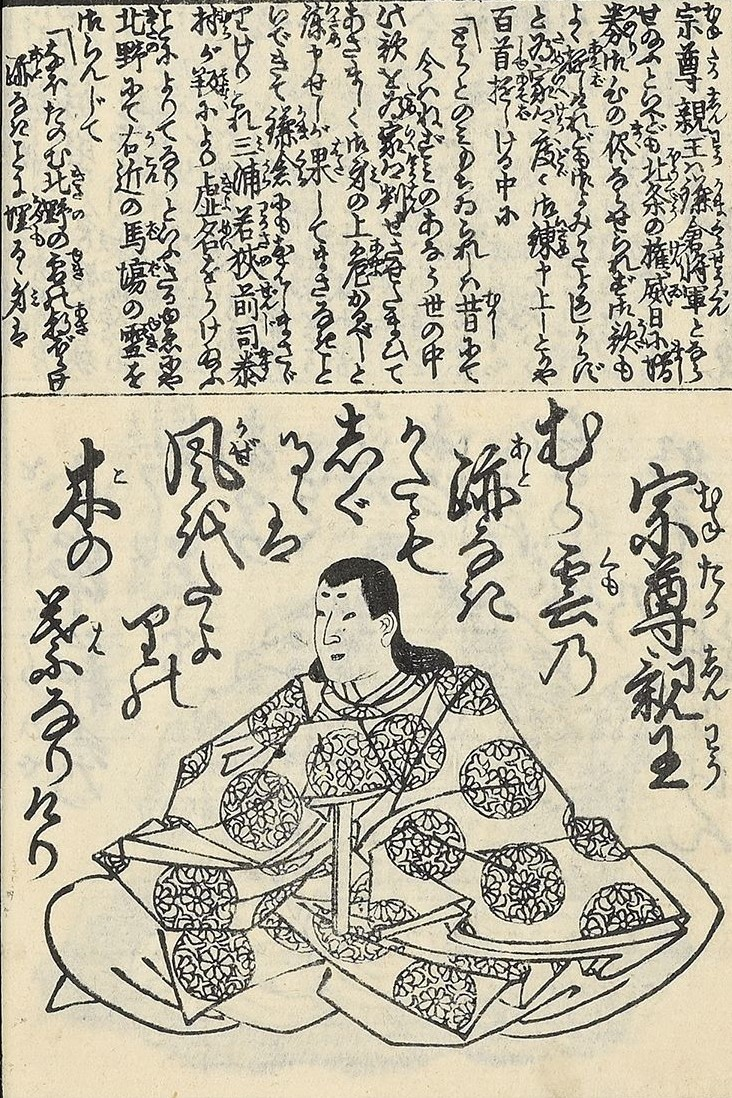

Shōgun
- In office: 10 May 1252 – 22 August 1266
- Predecessor: Fujiwara no Yoritsugu
- Successor: Prince Koreyasu
- Monarch: Go-Fukakusa; Kameyama
- Shikken: Hōjō Tokiyori; Hōjō Nagatoki; Hōjō Masamura
- Born: 15 December 1242; Heian-kyō, Japan
- Died: 2 September 1274 (aged 31); Heian-kyō, Japan
- Spouses: Konoe Saishi daughter of Horikawa Tomonori
- Issue: Prince Koreyasu; Princess Rinshi; Shingaku, Prince Hayata; Princess Zuishi
- Father: Emperor Go-Saga
- Mother: Taira no Muneko

Prince Munetaka (宗尊親王, Munetaka Shinnō; 15 December 1242 – 2 September 1274) was the sixth shōgun of the Kamakura shogunate of Japan who reigned from 1252 to 1266.

He was the first son of the Emperor Go-Saga and replaced the deposed Fujiwara no Yoritsugu as shōgun at the age of ten. He was a puppet ruler controlled by the Hōjō clan regents.

- 10 May 1252 (Kenchō 4, 1st day of the 4th month): Hōjō Tokiyori and Hōjō Shigetoki sent a representative to imperial capital Kyoto to accompany Munetaka to Kamakura where he would be installed as shogun.
- 22 August 1266 (Bun'ei 3, 20th day of the 7th month): Munetaka was deposed, and his son Koreyasu was installed as the 7th shōgun at the age of two.

The deposed shōgun became a Buddhist monk in 1272. His priestly name was Gyōshō. He was a writer of Waka poetry.

== Family ==
Parents

- Father: Emperor Go-Saga (後嵯峨天皇, Go-Saga-tennō, April 1, 1220 – March 17, 1272)
- Mother: Taira no Muneko (d. 1302), Taira no Munemoto's daughter
  Consorts and issues:
- Wife: Konoe Saiko (近衛 宰子, b. 1241), daughter of Konoe Kanetsune (近衛 兼経)
  - Prince Koreyasu (惟康親王, 26 May 1264 – 25 November 1326), first son
  - Princess Rinshi (掄子女王, b. 1265), Consort of Emperor Go-Uda, first daughter
- Concubine: Horikawa no Tsubone, daughter of Horikawa Tomomori (堀川具教)
  - Prince Hayata (早田宮真覚), second son
  - Princess Mizuko (瑞子女王) later Eikamon'in (永嘉門院; 1272–1329), Consort of Emperor Go-Uda, second daughter

== Eras of Munetaka's bakufu ==
The years in which Munetaka was shogun are more specifically identified by more than one era name or nengō.

- Kenchō (1249–1257)
- Kōgen (1256–1257)
- Shōka (1257–1259)
- Shōgen (1259–1260)
- Bun'ō (1260–1261)
- Kōchō (1261–1264)
- Bun'ei (1264–1275)

== Notes ==
Preceded by Kujō Yoritsugu	Shōgun: Prince Munetaka; 1252–1266	Succeeded by Prince Koreyasu
