= Hirotoki =

- Gender: Male

Origin
- Origin: Japanese
- Meaning: Different meanings depending on the kanji used

Hirotoki (written: 宏時 or 煕時) is a masculine Japanese given name. Notable people with the name include:

- Hōjō Hirotoki (北条 煕時; 1279–1315), Japanese noble
- Hirotoki Onozawa (小野澤 宏時; born 1978), Japanese rugby union player
