= Nagatoki =

- Gender: Male

Origin
- Origin: Japanese
- Meaning: Different meanings depending on the kanji used

Nagatoki (written: 長時) is a masculine Japanese given name. Notable people with the name include:

- Hōjō Nagatoki (北条 長時) (1227–1264), Japanese regent
- Ogasawara Nagatoki (小笠原 長時) (1519–1583), Japanese daimyō
