= Tokusō =

Title held by the head of Japan's Hōjō clan

Tokusō (Japanese: 得宗) was the title (post) held by the head of the mainline Hōjō clan, who also monopolized the position of shikken (regents to the shogunate) of the Kamakura shogunate in Japan during the period of Regent Rule (1199–1333). It’s important not to confuse a regent of the shogunate with a regent of the Emperor (the latter are called Sesshō and Kampaku). Shikkens were the first regents to the shogunate.

The tokusō from 1256 to 1333 was the military dictator of Japan as de facto head of the bakufu (shogunate); the shōgun being merely a puppet. This implies that all other positions in Japan—the Emperor, the Imperial Court, Sesshō and Kampaku, and the shikken (regent of the shōgun)—had also been reduced to figureheads.

== Origin ==
The name tokusō is said to have come from Tokushū (徳崇), the Buddhist name of Hōjō Yoshitoki, but his father Hōjō Tokimasa is usually regarded as the first tokusō. There were eight tokusō overall:

1. Hōjō Tokimasa
2. Hōjō Yoshitoki
3. Hōjō Yasutoki
4. Hōjō Tsunetoki
5. Hōjō Tokiyori
6. Hōjō Tokimune
7. Hōjō Sadatoki
8. Hōjō Takatoki

The political structure of the tokusō dictatorship was set up by Yasutoki and was consolidated by his grandson Tokiyori. The tokusō line held overwhelming power over the gokenin and the cadet lines of the Hōjō clan. Tokiyori often worked out policies at private meetings (寄合, yoriai) at his residence instead of discussing them at the Hyōjō (評定), the council of the shogunate. This made the tokusō's private retainers (御内人, miuchibito) stronger. In 1256, Tokiyori separated the positions of shikken and tokusō for the first time. Because of an illness, he installed his infant son Tokimune as the tokusō while Nagatoki, a collateral relative, was appointed shikken to assist Tokimune.

== See also ==
- Shikken
- Rensho
- Rokuhara Tandai
