= Hōjō Mototoki =

13th Shikken of the Kamakura shogunate

Hōjō Mototoki 北条 基時
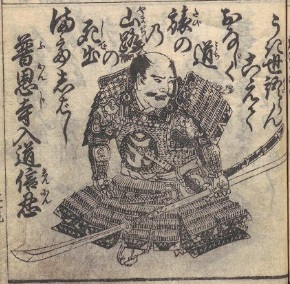

Shikken
- In office August 11, 1315 – July 28, 1316
- Monarch: Hanazono
- Shōgun: Prince Morikuni
- Rensho: Hōjō Sadaaki
- Preceded by: Hōjō Hirotoki
- Succeeded by: Hōjō Takatoki

Personal details
- Born: 1286
- Died: July 4, 1333
- Spouse: daughter of Hōjō Sadatoki
- Children: Hōjō Nakatoki; Hōjō Takamoto
- Parent: Hōjō Tokikane (father)

Hōjō Mototoki (北条 基時, 1286 – July 4, 1333) was the thirteenth Shikken (1315–1316) of the Kamakura shogunate.

Preceded by Hōjō Hirotoki	Hōjō Regent; 1315–1316	Succeeded by Hōjō Takatoki
Preceded by Hōjō Munekata	Rokuhara Tandai (Kitakata); 1301–1303	Succeeded by Hōjō Tokinori
