= Kujō Yoritsugu =

Military ruler of Japan from 1244 to 1252

Junior Third Rank Fujiwara no Yoritsugu 藤原 頼嗣

Shōgun
- In office 5 June 1244 – 31 March 1252
- Monarchs: Go-Saga; Go-Fukakusa
- Shikken: Hōjō Tsunetoki; Hōjō Tokiyori
- Preceded by: Fujiwara no Yoritsune
- Succeeded by: Prince Munetaka

Personal details
- Born: 17 December 1239 Kamakura, Japan
- Died: 14 October 1256 (aged 16) Kyoto, Japan
- Spouse: Hiwadahime
- Parents: Fujiwara no Yoritsune (father); Ōmiya no kata (mother)

Kujō Yoritsugu (九条 頼嗣; 17 December 1239 – 14 October 1256; r. 1244–1252), also known as Fujiwara no Yoritsugu (藤原 頼嗣), was the fifth shōgun of the Kamakura shogunate of Japan. His father was the 4th Kamakura shōgun, Kujō Yoritsune.

The Kujō family was one of the five branches of the historically powerful Fujiwara clan of imperial courtiers.

== Family ==
- Father: Kujō Yoritsune
- Mother: Omiya no Kata
- Wife: Hiwadahime (1230–1247)

== Events of Yoritsugu shogunate ==
- 1244 (Kangen 2): In the spring of this year, a number of extraordinary phenomena in the skies over Kamakura troubled Yoritsugu's father Yoritsune deeply.
- 1244 (Kangen 2, 4th month): Yoritsugu had his coming-of-age ceremonies at age 6. In the same month, his father asked Emperor Go-Saga for permission to give up his responsibilities as shōgun in favor of Yoritsugu.
- 1245 (Kangen 3, 7th month): Yoritsune shaved his head and became a Buddhist priest.
- 1246 (Kangen 4, 7th month): Yoritsugu married the sister of Hōjō Tsunetoki. He was seven, and she was sixteen.
- 1 September 1256 (Kōgen 1, 11th day of the 8th month): Yoritsugu's father dies at the age of 38.
- 14 October 1256 (Kōgen 1, 25th day of the 9th month): Yoritsugu dies at the age of 16.

== Eras of Yoritsugu's shogunate ==
The years in which Yoritsugu was shogun are more specifically identified by more than one era name or nengō.

- Kangen (1243–1247)
- Hōji (1247–1249)
- Kenchō (1249–1257)

== Notes ==
Preceded by Kujō Yoritsune	Shōgun: Kujō Yoritsugu; 1244–1252	Succeeded by Prince Munetaka
