= Hōjō Sadatoki =

9th Shikken of the Kamakura shogunate

Hōjō Sadatoki 北条 貞時
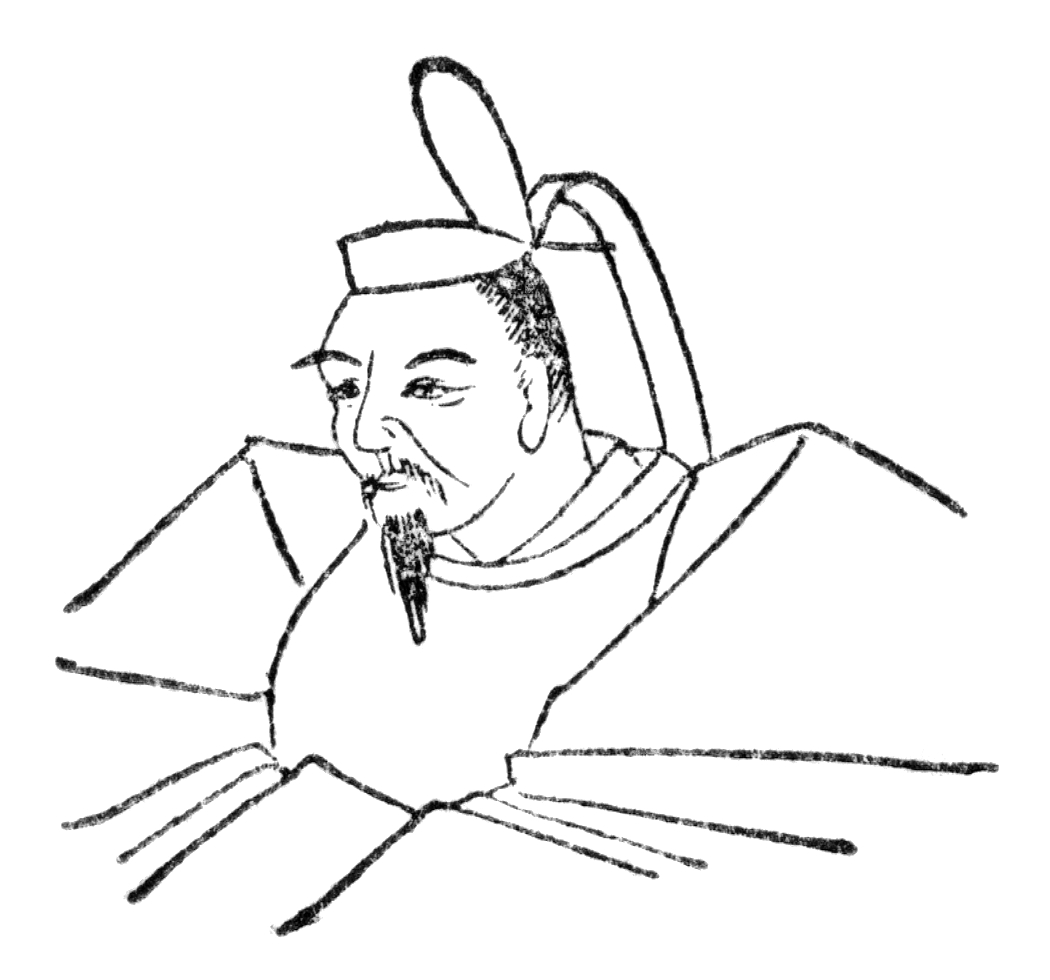

Shikken
- In office 1284–1301
- Monarchs: Go-Uda; Fushimi; Go-Fushimi
- Shōgun: Minamoto no Koreyasu; Prince Hisaaki
- Rensho: Hōjō Shigetoki; Hōjō Nobutoki
- Preceded by: Hōjō Tokimune
- Succeeded by: Hōjō Morotoki

Personal details
- Born: January 14, 1272
- Died: December 6, 1311 (aged 39)
- Spouse: daughter of Hōjō Munemasa
- Children: Kakuhisa; Hōjō Kikujumaru; Hōjō Takatoki; Hōjō Munemasa; Hōjō Yasuie; Sugyō; Hōjō Kanejumaru; Hōjō Chiyojumaru; four daughters
- Parents: Hōjō Tokimune (father); Kakusan-ni (mother)

Hōjō Sadatoki (北条 貞時; January 14, 1272 – December 6, 1311) was the ninth shikken (regent) of the Kamakura shogunate (reigned 1284–1301), and tokusō (de facto ruler of Japan) from his appointment as regent until his death.

== Early life and family ==
Sadatoki was the son of Hōjō Tokimune, the eighth regent of the Kamakura shogunate, and Lady Horiuchi, who later became known as Kakusan-ni. His mother came from the Adachi clan. His wet nurse was the wife of Taira no Yoritsuna.

== Start of regency ==
Sadatoki became a shikken at age 12 upon the death of his father in 1284. One of Sadatoki's advisors was Taira no Yoritsuna.

== Shimotsuki incident ==
The Hōjō clan had variously defeated many rival families, leaving only the Adachi clan, with whom the Hōjōs were allies. However, a plot by Adachi Yasumori to usurp the Hōjō resulted in Sadatoki authorizing Taira no Yoritsuna to attack the Adachi. It is possible Taira no Yoritsuna may have falsified the charges against Yasumori due to political rivalry.

The attack occurred in November 1285 and is known as the Shimotsuki incident. It was fought near the Adachi residence, and the Adachi were caught unaware. The fighting lasted five hours and Yasumori was forced to commit suicide, along with his family and many supporters. Over 500 died in all, and the Adachi family was almost exterminated. Adachi Yasumori was Sadatoki's father's brother-in-law.

== Heizen Gate incident ==
Sadatoki's soldiers killed Taira no Yoritsuna and 90 of his followers in the Heizen Gate Incident (平禅門の乱, Heizenmon no Ran) in 1293. He did this purge in confusion after the 1293 Kamakura earthquake.

== Regency ends and death ==
Sadatoki ended his regency and entered the Buddhist priesthood in 1301. Some sources claim that, although secluded in a temple, he continued to administer Japan until his death in 1311. He is enshrined with his father and Hōjō Takatoki, heir of Sadatoki and last tokusō of Hōjō Clan.

A mass requiem commemorating the 12th anniversary of Sadatoki's death took place at Engaku-ji in 1323. Jufuku-ji temple sent 260 priests.

Preceded by Hōjō Tokimune	Hōjō Regent; 1284–1301	Succeeded by Hōjō Morotoki
Preceded by Hōjō Tokimune	Tokusō; 1284–1311	Succeeded by Hōjō Takatoki
