= Hōjō Tokimune =

Shikken of the Kamakura shogunate in Japan

Junior First Rank Hōjō Tokimune 北条 時宗
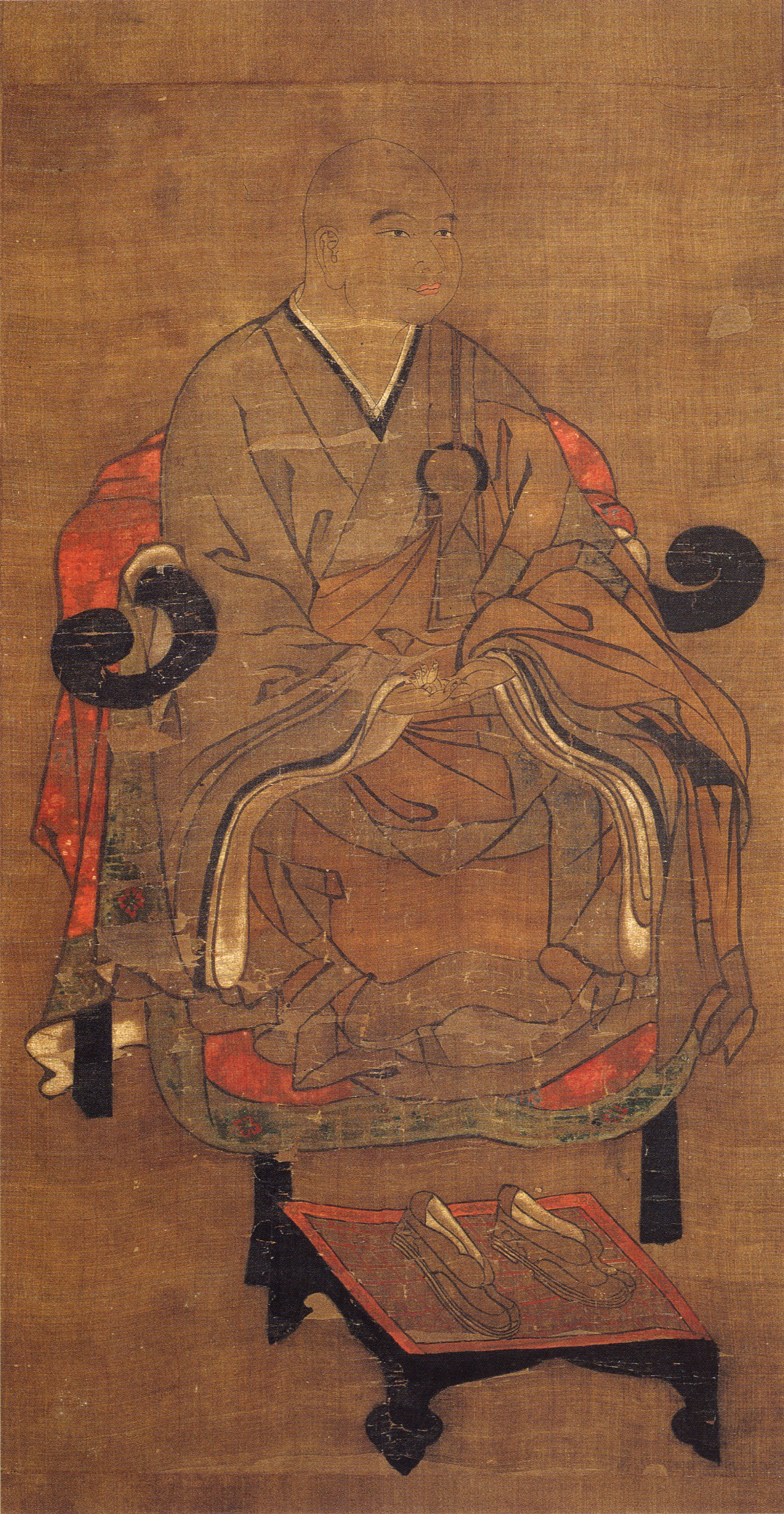

8th Shikken
- In office 18 April 1268 – 20 April 1284
- Monarchs: Kameyama; Go-Uda
- Shōgun: Minamoto no Koreyasu
- Rensho: Hōjō Masamura
- Preceded by: Hōjō Masamura
- Succeeded by: Hōjō Sadatoki

Rensho
- In office 1264–1268
- Preceded by: Hōjō Masamura
- Succeeded by: Hōjō Sadatoki

Personal details
- Born: 5 June 1251
- Died: 20 April 1284 (aged 32)
- Spouse: Kakusan-ni (daughter of Adachi Yoshikage)
- Children: Hōjō Sadatoki
- Parents: Hōjō Tokiyori (father); Kasai-dono (daughter of Hōjō Shigetoki) (mother)

Hōjō Tokimune (北条 時宗; Japanese pronunciation: [hoː.(d)ʑoː (|) to.kʲiꜜ.mɯ.ne], 5 June 1251 – 20 April 1284) of the Hōjō clan was the eighth shikken (officially regent of the shōgun, but de facto ruler of Japan) of the Kamakura shogunate (reigned 1268–84), known for leading the Japanese forces against the invasion of the Mongols and for spreading Zen Buddhism. He was the second son of Tokiyori, fifth shikken of the Kamakura shogunate. From birth, Tokimune was seen as the successor of tokusō, the head of the Hōjō clan. In 1268 AD, at the age of 18, he became shikken himself. During his lifetime, the seats of power of the Japanese Emperor, Imperial Regent (sesshō), Imperial Chief Advisor (kampaku), and the shōgun had all been completely marginalized by the Hōjō shikken.

== Life ==
Immediately upon his ascension as shikken, Tokimune was faced with a national crisis. The Mongol emperor, Kublai Khan, sent an envoy with the demand that Japan enter into a "tributary relationship" with the Mongols or face invasion and conquest. While many in the Japanese government, including members of the royal family, urged that a compromise be reached, the regent defiantly rejected the Mongol demand and sent back the headless bodies of the emissaries.

Because of his influence, Zen Buddhism became firmly established in Kamakura, then later in Kyoto and in the whole of Japan, especially among the warrior class.

In 1271, he banished Nichiren to Sado Island.

After the war with the Mongols ended, Tokimune turned his attention to other matters, like practicing Zen meditation and building Buddhist shrines and monasteries, such as the one at Engaku-ji as a memorial to those samurai who had died defeating the Mongols. As a teen and young man, he had been an advocate of the Ritsu sect of Buddhism, but converted to Zen at some point before the invasion. He was so committed to his faith that he "took the tonsure and became a Zen monk" on the day that he died.

== Defiance of Mongols ==
The Mongols had sent a threatening letter and emissaries to Japan in January 1268, and after discussion, Tokimune decided to have the emissaries sent back with no answer. The Mongols sent more emissaries time and time again: on 7 March 1269, on 17 September 1269, in September 1271 and in May 1272. But Tokimune had the emissaries of Kublai Khan driven away, without even permission to land each time. Soon after came the first invasion in 1274. But even after the failed invasion, five emissaries were sent in September 1275 to Kyūshū, and refused to leave without reply. Tokimune responded by having them brought to Kamakura and then beheading them. The graves of the five executed Mongol emissaries exist to this day in Kamakura at Tatsunokuchi. Then again on 29 July 1279, five more emissaries were sent, and again beheaded, this time in Hakata. Expecting an invasion, on 21 February 1280, the Imperial Court ordered all temples and shrines to pray for victory over the Mongol Empire. Kublai Khan gathered up troops for another invasion in 1281, which again was a failure, due in part to a typhoon.

== Zen advice ==
The Mongol invasion had been stopped by a typhoon (Kamikaze, "divine wind"), and the resistance of the new warrior class known as samurai. Tokimune planned and led the defence. Tokimune wanted to defeat cowardice, so he asked Mugaku Sogen (his Zen master) for advice. Mugaku Sogen replied he had to sit in meditation to find the source of his cowardice in himself.

When the Mongols invaded Japan, Tokimune went to Mugaku and said, "Finally there is the greatest event of my life." Mugaku asked, "How do you plan to face it?" Tokimune shouted, "Katsu!" (literally "Victory!"), demonstrating his resolve to triumph over the invaders. Mugaku responded with satisfaction: "It is true that the son of a lion roars as a lion!"

In part to the victory over the Mongols under Tokimune's guidance, Zen Buddhism began to spread among the samurai class with some rapidity.

Tokimune also linked Zen with the "moral" code of the samurai class (later called bushido) that stressed frugality, martial arts, loyalty and "honor unto death." Born from neo-Confucianism, bushido under Tokimune was mixed with elements of Shinto and Zen, adding a dose of wisdom and serenity to the otherwise violent code. Eventually, under the later Tokugawa shogunate, some of these teachings of bushido would be formalized in Japanese feudal law.

== In popular culture ==
- NHK's 2001 taiga drama series named Hōjō Tokimune highlighted the dramatic events just prior to Tokimune's birth and up to his death in 1284. Tokimune was portrayed by kyōgen actor, Izumi Motoya.
- Hōjō Tokimune leads the Japanese civilization in the 2016 4X video game Civilization VI. His leader ability, Divine Wind, grants bonus combat strength to units on coastal tiles. As a civilization, Japan's specialty districts gain an additional +1 adjacency bonus for each adjacent specialty district, a reference to the Meiji Restoration. This means that the districts become more powerful.

Preceded by Hōjō Masamura	Hōjō Regent; 1268–1284	Succeeded by Hōjō Sadatoki
Preceded by Hōjō Masamura	Rensho; 1264–1268	Succeeded by Hōjō Masamura
Preceded by Hōjō Tokiyori	Tokusō; 1256–1284	Succeeded by Hōjō Sadatoki
