= Goseibai Shikimoku =

Legal code of the Kamakura shogunate in Japan

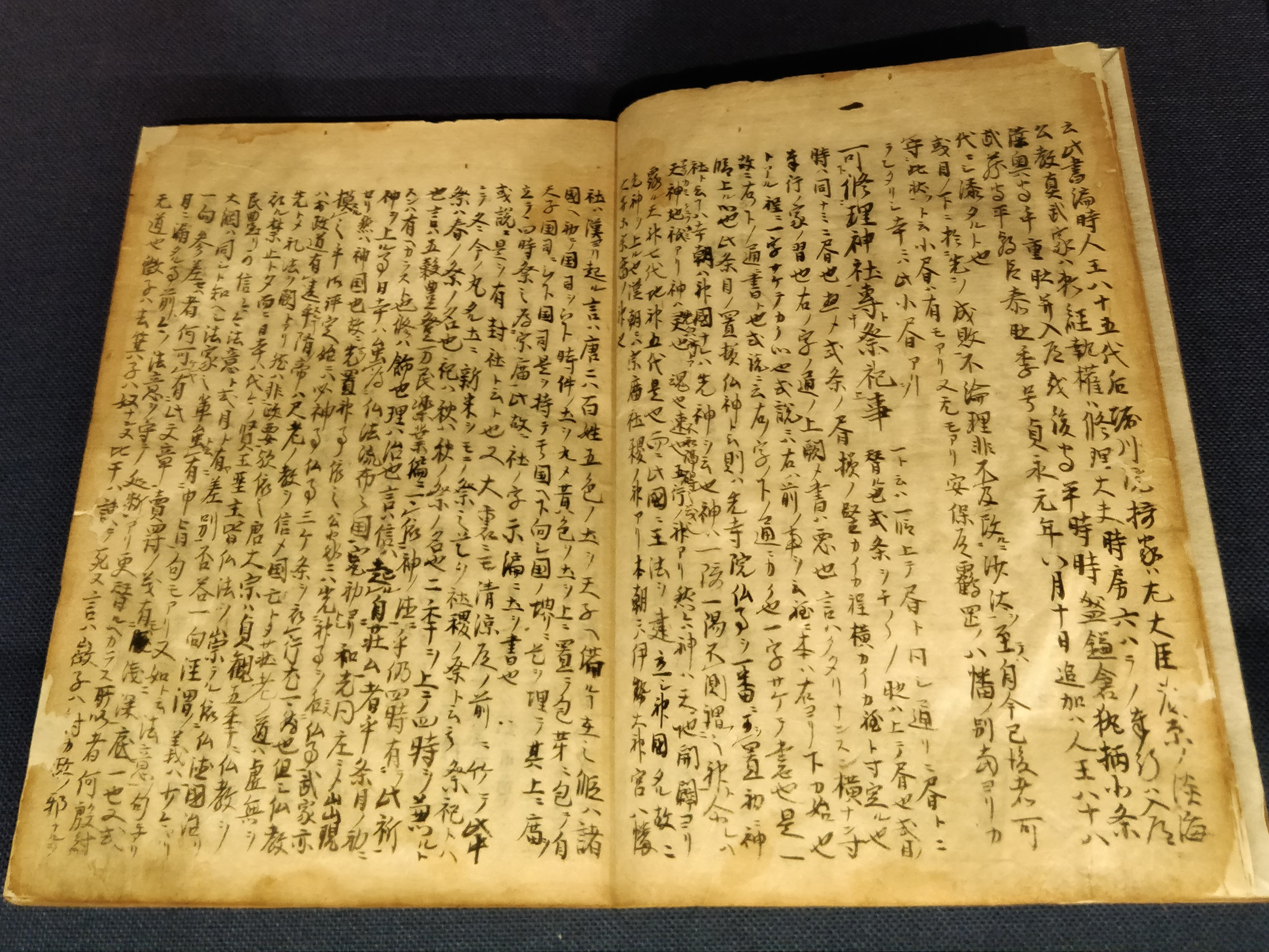
A copy of the Goseibai Shikimoku transcribed in the 17th century. Collection of the Tōyō Bunko, Tokyo.

The Goseibai Shikimoku (御成敗式目) or the Formulary of Adjudications was the legal code of the Kamakura shogunate in Japan, promulgated by third shikken Hōjō Yasutoki on 27 August 1232. It is also called Jōei Shikimoku (貞永式目) after the era name.

== Background ==
Before enacting the Goseibai Shikimoku, the Kamakura shogunate conducted trials without formal laws. After the Jōkyū War, an increasing number of land disputes between its vassals, aristocrats and peasants made fair trials indispensable. Thereafter Hōjō Yasutoki compiled the outline with 51 article headings and 13 Hyojoshu (councilors) completed it.

== Contents ==
The Goseibai Shikimoku explained to warriors (bushi) how the law dealt with crime and punishment, inheritance, and land rights. The code also laid out the duties of the jitō and shugo. About one third of the original articles covered the property of vassals, and seven were about property held by women.

== Women and inheritance ==
During the Kamakura shogunate, the heads of warrior families were called the sōryō. According to Wakita Haruko, the sōryō system permitted a larger part of the main lands to go to the sōryō, and allocated property equally to sons and daughters. Hitomi Tonomura agrees that daughters were as likely to inherit family property as sons in the early Kamakura period, although she finds no fixed pattern of how much each child received. In her sources, daughters would sometimes receive less inheritance than sons who were not the main heir.

== Later use ==
Supplementary articles to the Goseibai Shikimoku, called Tsuika (追加), were issued afterward. The Muromachi shogunate also adopted the Goseibai Shikimoku as the basic law. The Goseibai Shikimoku was largely repealed during the Edo period, though parts of it stayed in used until 1868, but was widely used as a textbook for writing in temple schools.
