= Hōjō Hirotoki =

12th Shikken of the Kamakura shogunate

Hōjō Hirotoki 北条 煕時
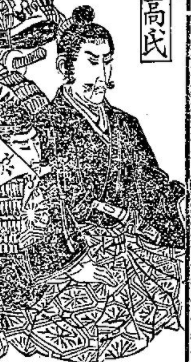
- Hōjō Hirotoki in Hōjō Kudaiki

Shikken
- In office July 6, 1312 – August 11, 1315
- Monarch: Hanazono
- Shōgun: Prince Morikuni
- Preceded by: Hōjō Munenobu
- Succeeded by: Hōjō Mototoki

Personal details
- Born: 1279
- Died: August 18, 1315
- Spouse: daughter of Hōjō Sadatoki
- Children: Hōjō Shigetoki; Hōjō Sadahiro; Hōjō Tanetoki; Hōjō Tokitoshi; Hōjō Hirosuke
- Parent: Hōjō Tametoki (father)

Hōjō Hirotoki (北条 煕時, 1279 – August 18, 1315) was the twelfth Shikken (1312–1315) of the Kamakura shogunate.

Preceded by Hōjō Munenobu	Hōjō Regent; 1312–1315	Succeeded by Hōjō Mototoki
Preceded by Hōjō Munenobu	Rensho; 1311–1312	Succeeded by Hōjō Sadaaki
