= Hōjō Tokiyori =

Shikken of the Kamakura shogunate (1227–1263)

- 北条 時頼
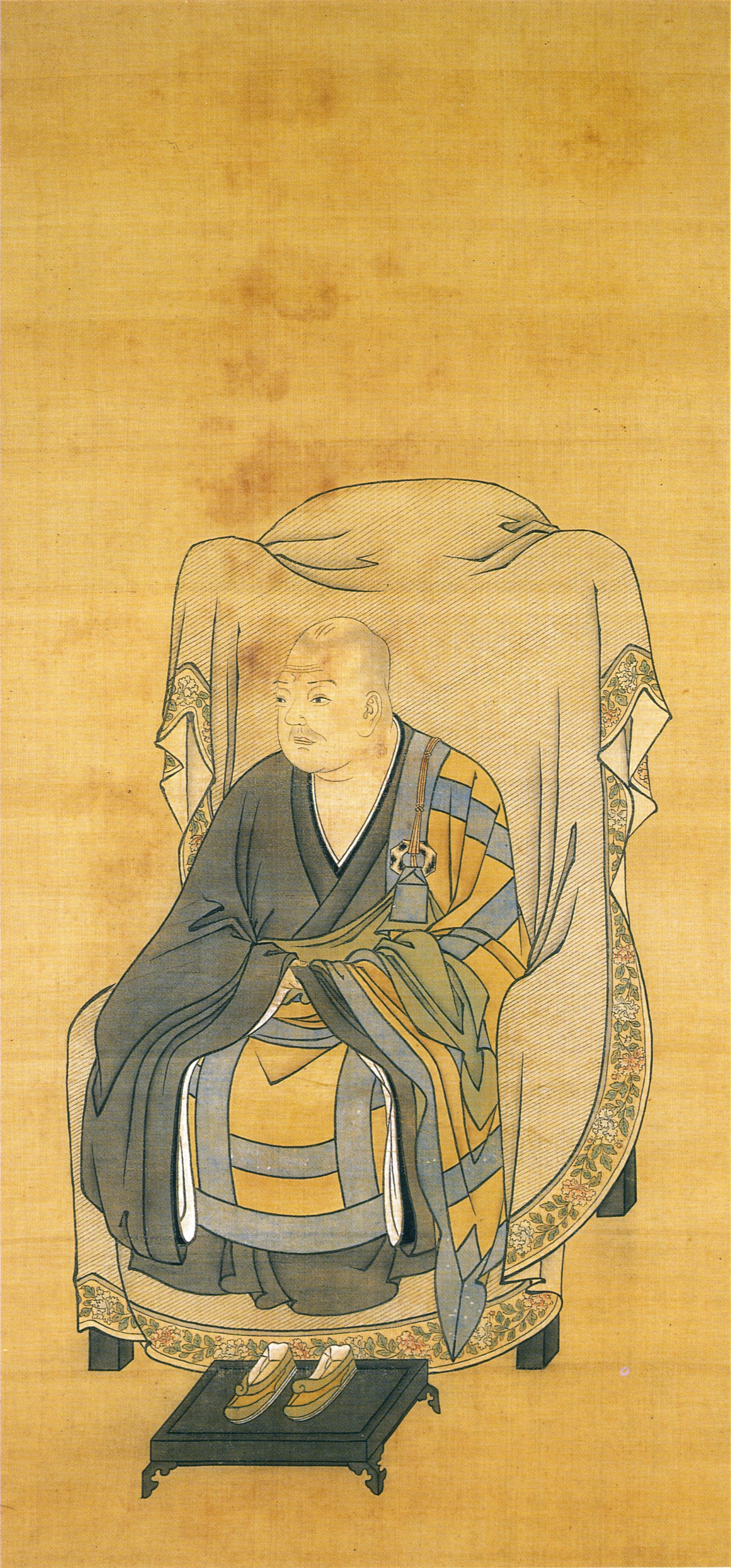

Shikken
- In office 1246–1256
- Monarchs: Go-Saga; Go-Fukakusa
- Shōgun: Fujiwara no Yoritsugu; Prince Munetaka
- Rensho: Hōjō Shigetoki
- Preceded by: Hōjō Tsunetoki
- Succeeded by: Hōjō Nagatoki

Personal details
- Born: June 29, 1227
- Died: December 24, 1263 (aged 36)
- Spouse(s): daughter of Mōri Suemitsu; Kasai-dono (daughter of Hōjō Shigetoki
- Children: Hōjō Tokisuke; Hōjō Tokimune; Hōjō Munemasa; Hōjō Munetoki; Hōjō Masayori; Hōjō Muneyori; Sakurada Jigon; a daughter
- Parents: Hōjō Tokiuji (father); Matsushita Zenni (mother)

Hōjō Tokiyori (北条 時頼; Japanese pronunciation: [hoː.(d)ʑoː (|) to.kʲiꜜ.jo.ɾʲi], June 29, 1227 – December 24, 1263) was the fifth shikken (regent of shogun) of the Kamakura shogunate in Japan.

== Early life ==
He was born to warrior monk Hōjō Tokiuji and a daughter of Adachi Kagemori, younger brother of Hōjō Tsunetoki, the fourth shikken, and grandson of Hōjō Yasutoki.

== Rule ==
Tokiyori became shikken following his brother Tsunetoki's death. Immediately after the succession, he crushed a coup plot by former shōgun Kujō Yoritsune and Tokiyori's relative Nagoe Mitsutoki. In the next year, he let Adachi Kagemori destroy the powerful Miura clan in the Battle of Hochi. He recalled his experienced grandfather's brother, Hōjō Shigetoki, from Kyoto and appointed him as rensho. In 1252, he replaced Shogun Kujō Yoritsugu with Prince Munetaka, and so successfully solidified the power base.

== Reforms ==
Tokiyori has been praised for his good administration. He worked on reforms mainly by writing various regulations. He reduced service of the vassals to guard Kyoto. He worked toward resolving the increasing land disputes of his vassals. In 1249, he set up the legal system of Hikitsuke or High Court.

== Personal life and dictatorship ==
In 1252, he started to make policies at private meetings held at his residence instead of discussing at the Hyōjō (評定), the council of the shogunate. In 1256, when he became a Buddhist priest, he transferred the position of shikken to Hōjō Nagatoki, a son of Shigetoki, while his infant son with women named Akiko, Tokimune, succeeded to become tokusō, the head of the Hōjō clan and his son with Tsubone Sanuki, Hōjō Tokisuke succeeded as the head of rokuhara, thus separating the positions for the first time. He continued to rule in fact but without any official position. This is considered the beginning of the tokusō dictatorship. Tokiyori invited Lanxi Daolong, a monk from Southern Song Dynasty, to construct Kenchō-ji temple. He later invited monk Dōgen to teach him.

== Legends ==
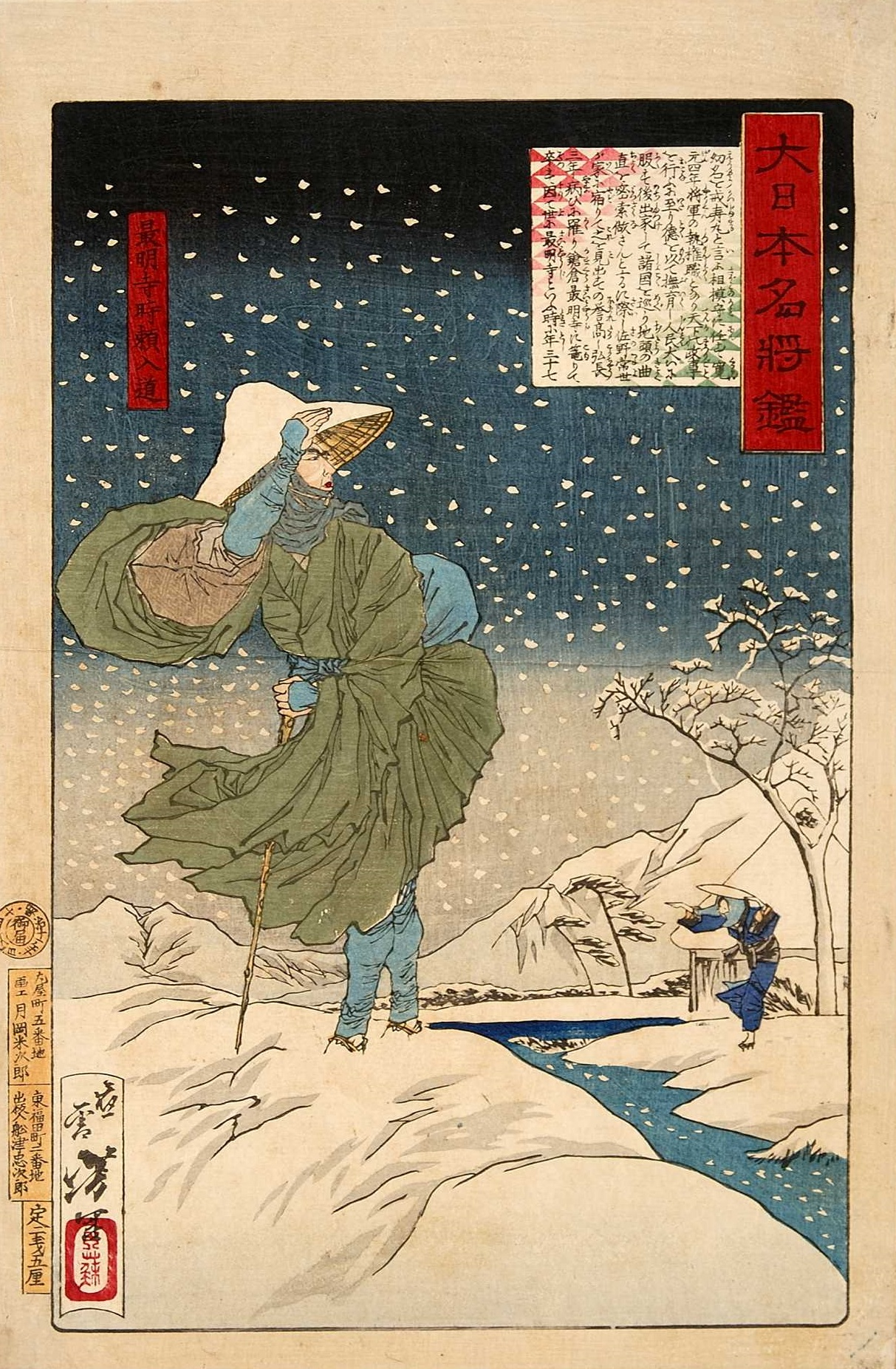
Hōjō Tokiyori, also known as Saimyoji Tokiyori Nyudo, who goes on the snowy road.

There are a number of legends that Tokiyori traveled incognito throughout Japan to inspect actual conditions and improve the lives of the people. This is the reason for which a 'pilgrimage legend' famous as a Noh play entitled "Hachi no ki” is based off. Tokiyori owned one of the Tenka Goken Onimaru Kunitsuna which was used to kill an oni threatening him.

== Death ==
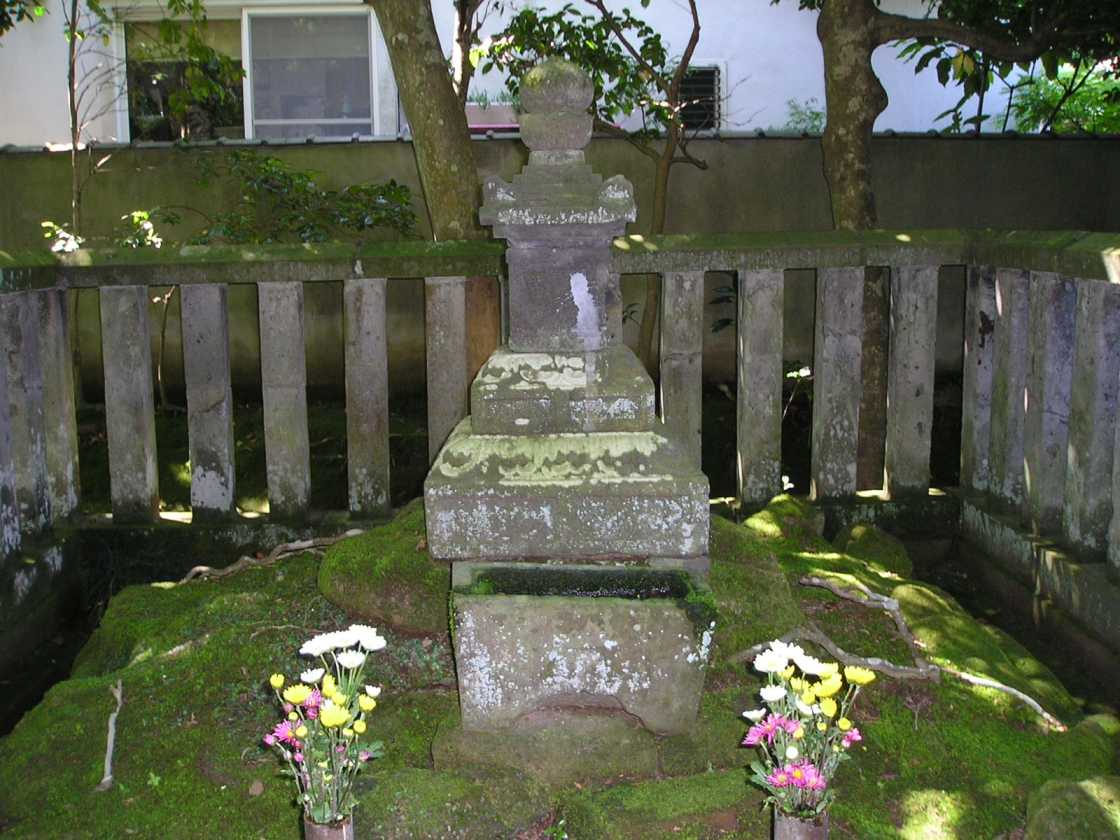
Hōjō Tokiyori's tomb.

In 1256, Tokiyori became ill, and consequently he surrendered the regency to his relative, Hōjō Nagatoki, whereupon he became a priest and called himself Meigetsuin Nyudo. However, it is said that Tokiyori in fact managed politics after his retirement from the regency. At that time, Tokimune, Tokiyori's eldest son (born in 1251), was only six years old, and therefore it was impossible for Tokimune to take over the regency. It is said that such circumstances gave rise to Tokiyori's intention to appoint Nagatoki to serve as a regent in place of Tokimune until Tokimune's attainment of manhood and thereafter to have Tokimune assume the regency from Nagatoki. Contrary to his intention, Tokiyori assumed real political power after his retirement, and this heralded the Tokuso family in the Hojo family. Tokiyori died in 1263 at the age of 36.

Preceded by Hōjō Tsunetoki	Hōjō Regent (Shikken); 1246–1256	Succeeded by Hōjō Nagatoki
Preceded by Hōjō Tsunetoki	Tokusō; 1246–1256	Succeeded by Hōjō Tokimune
