= Moncho-jo =

Medieval Japanese legal institution

The moncho-jo was a Kamakura era institution established by Minamoto no Yoritomo in 1184 as a board of inquiry that dealt with legal matters such as lawsuits and appeals. Most cases included land rights, business dealings and loans. This court of appeals dealt with property disputes that could not be settled at a lower level, which prevented a lot of unnecessary property-based warfare.

== See also ==
- Kamakura shogunate
- Kamakura period
