= Hōjō Munenobu =

11th Shikken of the Kamakura shogunate

- 北条 宗宣
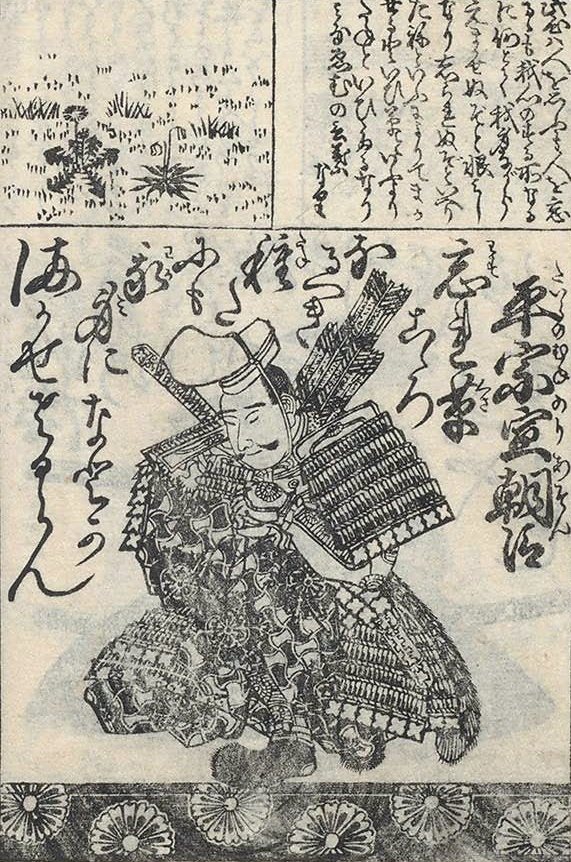

Shikken
- In office November 13, 1311 – July 4, 1312
- Monarch: Hanazono
- Shōgun: Prince Morikuni
- Rensho: Hōjō Hirotoki
- Preceded by: Hōjō Morotoki
- Succeeded by: Hōjō Hirotoki

Rensho
- In office 1305–1311
- Preceded by: Hōjō Tokimura
- Succeeded by: Hōjō Hirotoki

Personal details
- Born: 1259
- Died: July 16, 1312
- Spouse(s): daughter of Hōjō Tokishige daughter of Utsunomiya Tsunetsuna
- Children: Hōjō Koresada; a daughter
- Parents: Hōjō Nobutoki (father); daughter of Hōjō Tokihiro (mother)
- Nickname(s): Osaragi Munenobu 大仏 宗宣

Hōjō Munenobu (北条 宗宣, 1259 – July 16, 1312) was the eleventh Shikken (1311–1312) of the Kamakura shogunate. He is also known as Osaragi Munenobu (大仏 宗宣).

Preceded by Hōjō Morotoki	Hōjō Regent; 1311–1312	Succeeded by Hōjō Hirotoki
Preceded by Hōjō Tokimura	Rensho; 1305–1311	Succeeded by Hōjō Hirotoki
Preceded by Hōjō Morifusa	Rokuhara Tandai (Minamikata); 1297–1302	Succeeded by Hōjō Sadaaki
