= Hōjō Yoshimasa =

Hōjō Yoshimasa (北条 義政) (c. 1242–43 – January 8, 1282) was a rensho of the Kamakura shogunate from 1273 to 1277.

Preceded by Hōjō Masamura	Rensho; 1273–1277	Succeeded by Hōjō Shigetoki
