= Hōjō Yoshitoki =

2nd Shikken of the Kamakura shogunate

Hōjō Yoshitoki 北条 義時
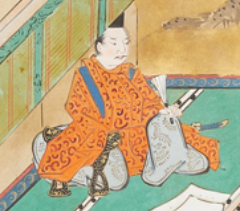

Shikken
- In office 1205–1224
- Monarchs: Tsuchimikado; Juntoku; Chūkyō; Go-Horikawa
- Shōgun: Minamoto no Sanetomo
- Preceded by: Hōjō Tokimasa
- Succeeded by: Hōjō Yasutoki

Conference of Thirteen
- In office 1199–1200 Serving with Ōe no Hiromoto, Miyoshi no Yasunobu, Nakahara no Chikayoshi, Nikaidō Yukimasa, Kajiwara Kagetoki, Adachi Tōmoto, Adachi Morinaga, Hatta Tomoie, Hiki Yoshikazu, Hōjō Tokimasa, Miura Yoshizumi, Wada Yoshimori

Personal details
- Born: 1163
- Died: July 1, 1224
- Spouse(s): Hime no Mae; Iga no Kata
- Children: Hōjō Yasutoki; Hōjō Tomotoki; Hōjō Shigetoki; Hōjō Aritoki; Hōjō Masamura; Hōjō Saneyasu; Hōjō Tokihisa; Take-dono; five other daughters
- Parents: Hōjō Tokimasa (father); Daughter of Itō Sukechika (mother)
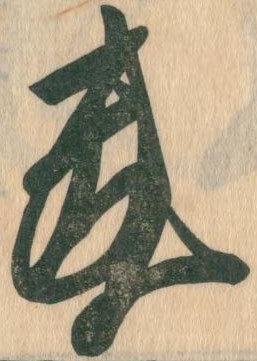
- Signature

Hōjō Yoshitoki (北条 義時; 1163 – July 1, 1224) was the second Hōjō shikken (regent) of the Kamakura shogunate and head of the Hōjō clan. He was the second son of Hōjō Tokimasa. He was shikken from the abdication of his father Tokimasa in 1205 until his death in 1224.

== Early years (1163–1183) ==
Hōjō Yoshitoki was born in 1163, who was the second son of Hōjō Tokimasa and his wife, who was a daughter of Itō Sukechika. At the time of his birth, he had an older brother, Hōjō Munetoki, and an older sister, Hōjō Masako. Later on in the decade, he would have another brother, Hōjō Tokifusa, and a sister whose name remains unknown. The birth dates of these two latter siblings are not known. The Hōjō clan was at that time in control of Izu, and Yoshitoki, being a Hōjō, was also a descendant of the Taira clan and also of the imperial family.

At that time, the Taira, under Taira no Kiyomori, had consolidated their power in Kyoto, the capital, and expelled the Minamoto clan, their rival. Minamoto no Yoshitomo, the head of the clan, was executed, while his sons who were not executed were exiled or ordered into monasteries. The cloistered emperor, Emperor Go-Shirakawa, as well as his son, the emperor at that time (who was a puppet), Emperor Nijō, were also in Kyoto. Minamoto no Yoritomo, Yoshitomo's heir, was exiled to Izu, which was where the Hōjō domains were. (His other brothers, Minamoto no Yoshitsune and Minamoto no Noriyori were ordered into monasteries near Kyoto).

Yoshitoki was from the first day of his life expected to succeed his father as the head of the Hōjō clan in Izu. He had a very close relationships with his siblings, especially his sister Masako.

In 1179, Masako fell in love with the young Minamoto exile, Minamoto no Yoritomo, and they wed. The marriage was supported fully by the young Hōjō heir, Yoshitoki. In 1180, Masako and Yoritomo had a daughter, Ō-Hime. That same year, a disgruntled Prince Mochihito, a son of Go-Shirakawa, grew weary of the Taira leadership, believing he was denied the throne just so his young nephew, Emperor Antoku, who was half Taira, could be enthroned. He called the Minamoto leaders all over Japan to overthrow the Taira.

Yoritomo responded readily, and Yoshitoki, Masako, Tokimasa, and the entire Hōjō clan supported him. Yoritomo's half-brothers, Yoshitsune and Noriyori joined him. Yoritomo created his base east of Izu in Kamakura, located in Sagami Province. The Genpei War had begun, and Yoshitoki was ordered by his father to aid Yoritomo in any way he can. Yoshitoki's elder brother, Munetoki, died during the war in 1180. The next year, 1181, Taira no Kiyomori died, and was succeeded by his son, Taira no Munemori.

In 1182, the 19-year-old Yoshitoki, amidst the war, wed. His wife is unknown. We do know that in 1183, they had their first child, Hōjō Yasutoki, who would become the heir to the Hōjō following his father's death. The previous year, Yoritomo and Masako had a son, who would be the Minamoto heir, Minamoto no Yoriie. In 1183, Yoritomo's rival and cousin, Minamoto no Yoshinaka, entered Kyoto and drove out the Heike (and the young Emperor Antoku). Yoshinaka was then driven out of Kyoto by Yoshitsune in the name of Yoritomo. The Minamoto quickly enthroned Emperor Go-Toba.

== Rise to power (1185–1205) ==
In 1185, the Genpei War ended when the Minamoto defeated the Taira at the Battle of Dan no Ura, and most of the Taira leaders were executed or committed suicide (including Emperor Antoku, who drowned). The Minamoto were now in control of Japan, and established their base in Kamakura. This also placed the Hōjō in a very powerful position as well. That year, Hōjō Tokimasa received from Cloistered Emperor Go-Shirakawa the first appointments for jitō and shugo, or constable and steward.

In 1192, cloistered emperor Go-Shirakawa (who died later that year) bestowed upon Yoritomo the title of shōgun. That same year, Masako and Yoritomo had another son, Minamoto no Sanetomo. Yoshitoki was now also in a very powerful position, especially after Yoritomo died in 1199. Masako became a nun, but was still involved in politics, while Yoshitoki prepared to be heir.

Hōjō Tokimasa became regent for Shogun Yoriie, Yoritomo's son who disliked the Hōjō and preferred his father-in-law's family, the Hiki clan under Hiki Yoshikazu. Yoshitoki, Masako, and Tokimasa presided over a council of regents in 1200 to help Yoriie in ruling the country, but Yoriie distrusted the Hōjō, and in 1203 plotted with Yoshikazu to have Hōjō Tokimasa murdered. Yoshitoki had no idea about this, but Masako found out and told her father. Tokimasa had Yoshikazu executed in 1203. During the gore, Yoriie's son and heir, Minamoto no Ichiman, was also executed. Yoriie, out of support, abdicated in 1203, went to live in Izu, and was executed on Tokimasa's orders in 1204.

Later on, Minamoto no Sanetomo, Yoritomo's second son, became shogun. Tokimasa ruled as regent for him also, but he fell out with the Hōjō, and Tokimasa plotted to have him executed. During this period, a certain Hatakeyama Shigetada, Yoshitoki's brother in law who had married his sister (not Masako) was executed by Tokimasa's men, on false charges of treason. Yoshitoki had been close with him, and began to distrust his father. When there were plans to have Sanetomo executed also, Masako and Yoshitoki ordered their father to abdicate or they would rebel. Tokimasa shaved his head, became a monk, and retired to a monastery/nunnery in Kamakura, only dying in 1215.

Hōjō Yoshitoki thus succeeded Tokimasa as shikken (regent).

== Regency and death (1205–1224) ==
Yoshitoki's regency was very quiet and uneventful until the final few years of it. He was aided by his sister, the "nun-shōgun" Masako. In 1218, Regent Yoshitoki sent Masako to Kyoto to ask the now Cloistered Emperor Go-Toba if one of his sons, Prince Nagahito, could become Shogun Sanetomo's heir, since he had no children. She was refused.

In 1219, Shogun Sanetomo was assassinated by his nephew, the late Yoriie's son, who was later murdered himself. Thus, the Minamoto line died out. That same year, Regent Yoshitoki chose a distant Minamoto relative, Kujō Yoritsune, who was of the Kujō clan and thus a Fujiwara. He was the new Shogun, but Yoshitoki was still regent.

In 1221, the Jōkyū War occurred. Cloistered emperor Go-Toba, disillusioned with the Hōjō, declared Regent Yoshitoki an outlaw and wanted him executed. Kyoto was now in open rebellion, Yoshitoki ordered his troops to attack Kyoto, and the city was taken in 1221. Masako helped discover the plot. Go-Toba was exiled to the Oki Islands. Yoshitoki's son, Hōjō Yasutoki, took the capital.

Nonetheless, in 1224, Hōjō Yoshitoki suddenly died of an illness. He was 61 years old. He was succeeded by his son and heir, Hōjō Yasutoki, as the third Shikken for Shogun Yoritsune. His sister Masako survived him for a year, before she to succumbed in 1225 at the age of 69.

== Genealogy ==
Parents

- Father: Hōjō Tokimasa (北条 時政, 1138 – February 6, 1215)
- Mother: Daughter of Itō Sukechika (伊東 祐親, also known as Itō Nyūdō (伊東入道))

Consorts and issue:

- Wife: Awa no Tsubone (阿波局)
  - Son: Hōjō Yasutoki (北条 泰時; 1183 – 14 July 1242)
- Wife: Hime no Mae (姫の前), Hiki Tomomune's daughter (比企 朝宗)
  - Son: Hōjō Tomotoki (北条 朝時; 1193 – 3 May 1245)
  - Son: Hōjō Shigetoki (北条 重時; 11 July 1198 – 26 November 1261)
  - Daughter: Take-dono (竹殿), married to Ōe no Chikahiro (大江 親広) and later to Tsuchimikado Sadamichi (土御門 定通)
- Wife: Daughter of 伊佐 朝政
  - Son: Hōjō Aritoki (北条 有時; 7 July 1200 – 23 March 1270)
- Wife: Iga no Kata (伊賀の方), Iga Tomomitsu's daughter (伊賀 朝光)
  - Son Hōjō Masamura (北条 政村; 10 July 1205 – 13 June 1273), 7th Shikken of the Kamakura shogunate
  - Son: Hōjō Saneyasu (北条 実泰; 1208 – 29 October 1263)
  - Son: Hojo Tokihisa (北条 時尚)
  - Daughter: married to Ichijō Sanemasa (一条 実雅), and later to Karahashi Michitoki (唐橋 通時)
- Wife: Unknown Women
  - Daughter: married to Ichijō Sanemasa (一条 実雅)
  - Daughter: married to Nakahara no Suetoki (中原 季時)
  - Daughter: married to 一条 能基
  - Daughter: married to Bekki Shigehide (戸次 重秀)
  - Daughter: married to Sasaki Nobutsuna (佐々木 信綱)

== See also ==
- The 13 Lords of the Shogun, a TV series about the life of Yoshitoki.

Preceded by Hōjō Tokimasa	Hōjō Regent; 1205–1224	Succeeded by Hōjō Yasutoki
Preceded by Hōjō Tokimasa	Tokusō; 1205–1224	Succeeded by Hōjō Yasutoki
