= Hōjō Tokimura =

Rensho of the Kamakura shogunate

Hōjō Tokimura (北条 時村; 1242 – May 17, 1305) was a rensho of the Kamakura shogunate from 1301 to 1305.

Preceded by Hōjō Nobutoki	Rensho; 1301–1305	Succeeded by Hōjō Munenobu
Preceded by Hōjō Yoshimune	Rokuhara Tandai (Kitakata); 1277–1287	Succeeded by Hōjō Kanetoki
