= Hōjō Shigetoki (born 1303) =

Hōjō Shigetoki (北条茂時) (1303 – July 4, 1333) was the last rensho of the Kamakura shogunate, serving from 1330 to 1333.

Preceded by Hōjō Koresada	Rensho; 1330–1333	Succeeded by (none)
