= Hōjō Nagatoki =

6th Shikken of the Kamakura shogunate

Hōjō Nagatoki 北条 長時
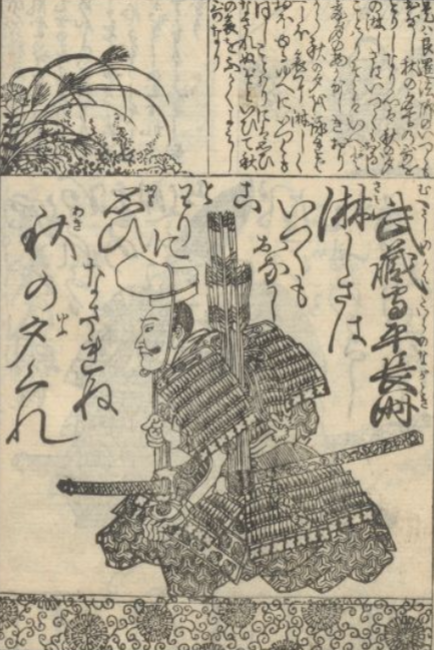

Shikken
- In office 1256–1264
- Monarchs: Go-Fukakusa; Kameyama
- Shōgun: Prince Munetaka
- Rensho: Hōjō Masamura
- Preceded by: Hōjō Tokiyori
- Succeeded by: Hōjō Masamura

Personal details
- Born: April 11, 1230
- Died: September 12, 1264 (aged 34)
- Spouse: daughter of Hōjō Tokimori
- Children: Hōjō Yoshimune; Chōben
- Parents: Hōjō Shigetoki (father); Jibu no Tsubone (daughter of Taira no Motochika) (mother)

Hōjō Nagatoki (北条 長時, 1227–1264) was the sixth Shikken (1256–1264) of the Kamakura Bakufu and the 4th Chief of the Rokuhara Tandai North Branch Kitakata, son of Hōjō Shigetoki, grandson of Hōjō Yoshitoki, the second Shikken.

Preceded by Hōjō Tokiyori	Hōjō Regent (Shikken); 1256–1264	Succeeded by Hōjō Masamura
Preceded by Hōjō Shigetoki	Rokuhara Tandai (Kitakata); 1247–1256	Succeeded by Hōjō Tokimochi
