= Hōjō Nobutoki =

Hōjō Nobutoki (北条 宣時, 1238 – August 2, 1323), also known as Osaragi Nobutoki (大仏宣時), was a rensho of the Kamakura shogunate from 1287 to 1301.

Preceded by Hōjō Shigetoki	Rensho; 1287–1301	Succeeded by Hōjō Tokimura
