= Mandokoro =

Ancient Japanese governing body

Mandokoro (政所) was the chief governing body of an important family or monastic complex in ancient Japan. This name was borrowed for the administrative department of the Shogunate in feudal and medieval times.

== History ==
The earliest usage of the term was found in the Heian period, referring to a governing body consisting of royalty and high-ranked kuge (higher than ju-sammi). Subsequently, during the Kamakura and Muromachi periods, the primary executive branch of the Bakufu (office of the Shogunate) was called by this name.

During the Kamakura Shogunate, the Mandokoro governed administration and finance. It was formerly called Kumonjo (公文所, lit. 'Board of Public Papers'), and the date when it was renamed is argued. There are two major proposed dates, 1191 or 1185.

The first chief of the Mandokoro was Ōe no Hiromoto. Later, shikken or rensho occupied this position. The position of executive director, serving also as the treasurer, was held by the Nikaidō clan.

During the Muromachi Shogunate, the Mandokoro was the office of finance and process on fiefs. Except in its earliest days, the position of chief of the Mandokoro was held by members of the Ise clan, starting in 1379.

== Kita no Mandokoro ==
As Kita no Mandokoro (北政所) (lit. 'North Mandokoro'), Mandokoro was also used as an honorific title referring to the wife of the sesshō (regent) or the kampaku; these women had great political power and influence in their own right. For example, Kōdai-in, the wife of Toyotomi Hideyoshi, who held the rank of Kampaku in 1586, was styled Kita no Mandokoro (lit. 'North Mandokoro'), and his mother was styled Ōmandokoro (lit. 'Great Mandokoro').

During the Heian period, the wives of the kuge were often called Kita-no-kata (北の方, 'Lady in the North'), since their residence was normally placed in the northern complex of the palace.

== See also ==
- Midaidokoro
