= Hōjō Shigetoki (born 1241) =

Hōjō Naritoki (北条 業時) (c. 1241–42 – August 13, 1287) was a rensho of the Kamakura shogunate from 1283 to 1287.

Preceded by Hōjō Yoshimasa	Rensho; 1283–1287	Succeeded by Hōjō Nobutoki
