= Hyōjōsho =

The Hyōjōsho (評定所), established in 1225 by Hōjō Yasutoki, was a judicial council in Japan.

== Overview ==
During the Tokugawa shogunate it was composed of the Rōjū (Elders), the highest officials in the shogunate government, and a number of Commissioners called Bugyō, who headed certain executive departments. The role of the council was partially executive, and partially judicial, and they served from a Council Chamber within Edo Castle.

Unlike many modern governmental councils or organizations, the Hyōjōsho members had other responsibilities and powers, outside of being members of the council. In addition to the Rōjū, the members of the Hyōjōsho were the Machi-bugyō (City Commissioners), Jisha-bugyō (Commissioners of Shrines and Temples), Kanjō-bugyō (Finance Commissioners), and the Ōmetsuke (Chief Inspectors).

== Summary of each clan grading office ==
Each clan also had an organization that judged the samurai under its own jurisdiction as well, and it was called an appraisal office or a royal house. In Sendai domain, it was located on the banks of the Hirose river, so it remains as a place name called appraisal Kawahara even after its abolition.
