= Hōjō Shigetoki (born 1198) =

Japanese samurai

Hōjō Shigetoki 北条重時

Rensho
- In office 1247–1256
- Preceded by: Hōjō Tokifusa
- Succeeded by: Hōjō Masamura

Personal details
- Born: July 11, 1198
- Died: November 26, 1261 (aged 63)
- Children: Hōjō Tokitsugu; Hōjō Nagatoki; Hōjō Tokishige; Hōjō Naritoki; Hōjō Yoshimasa; Hōjō Tadatoki; and others
- Parents: Hōjō Yoshitoki (father); Hime no Mae (mother)

Hōjō Shigetoki (北条重時) (July 11, 1198 – November 26, 1261) was a Japanese samurai of the Kamakura period. He was the third Kitakata Rokuhara tandai, serving from 1230 to 1247. He was also known as Lord Gokuraku-ji (極楽寺殿, Gokurakuji-dono). His writings influenced later samurai philosophy.

Preceded by Hōjō Tokifusa	Rensho; 1247-1256	Succeeded by Hōjō Masamura
Preceded by Hōjō Tokiuji	Rokuhara Tandai (Kitakata); 1230–1247	Succeeded by Hōjō Nagatoki
