= Rensho =

The Rensho (連署; "co-signatory") was the assistant to the shikken (regent) of the Kamakura shogunate in medieval Japan.

The rensho placed his signature next to that of the shikken on official orders. In 1224 the third shikken Hōjō Yasutoki appointed Hōjō Tokifusa as the first rensho. From then on, the rensho was chosen from influential members of the Hōjō clan, but not from the main line of the clan (tokusō), with the one exception of Tokimune, who temporarily occupied the position from 1264 to 1268.

== List of Rensho ==
Note: There are three Hōjō Shigetoki's, all different people

1. Hōjō Tokifusa (r. 1225–1240)
2. Hōjō Shigetoki (北条重時) (r. 1247–1256)
3. Hōjō Masamura (r. 1256–1264)
4. Hōjō Tokimune (r. 1264–1268)
5. Hōjō Masamura (r. 1268–1273)
6. Hōjō Yoshimasa (r. 1273–1277)
7. Hōjō Shigetoki (北条業時) (r. 1283–1287)
8. Hōjō Nobutoki aka Osaragi Nobutoki (r. 1287–1301)
9. Hōjō Tokimura (r. 1301–1305)
10. Hōjō Munenobu aka Osaragi Munenobu (r. 1305–1311)
11. Hōjō Hirotoki (r. 1311–1312)
12. Hōjō Sadaaki (r. 1315–1326)
13. Hōjō Koresada (r. 1326–1327)
14. Hōjō Shigetoki (北条茂時) (r. 1330–1333)

== See also ==
- Shikken
- Tokusō
- Rokuhara Tandai
