= Shikken =

Japanese office, originally a shogun's regent

The shikken (執権; Japanese pronunciation: [ɕi̥k.keɴ]) was a senior government post held by members of the Hōjō clan, officially a regent of the shogunate. From 1199 to 1333, during the Kamakura period, the shikken served as the head of the bakufu (shogun's government). This era was referred to as Regent Rule (執権政治, Shikken Seiji).

During roughly the first half of that period, the shikken was the de facto military dictator of Japan. In 1256 the title of shikken was relegated to the second in command of the Tokusō (a separate rank also monopolized by the Hojō clan). By the Muromachi period (1333–1573) the position, though not abolished, had lost much of its power and was no longer considered as one of the top ranks. The position was abolished after the Muromachi period.

== Etymology ==
The word shikken is the on'yomi reading of the combination of the two kanji characters 執 and 権, meaning "to hold (something in the hand, or a service or ceremony); to administer" and "power, authority" respectively. Therefore, the word literally means "to hold power/authority".

== History ==
=== Shikken as supreme ruler (1199–1256) ===
Though officially a regent for the shōgun in the Kamakura shogunate in Japan, on paper deriving power from the shōgun, in reality the shōgun had been reduced to a figurehead in a similar marginalizing manner to how the emperor and imperial court had been reduced to figureheads by the first shōgun Minamoto no Yoritomo. Both the posts of shikken and tokusō were monopolized by the Hōjō clan.

Hōjō Tokimasa was the father-in-law of Yoritomo through his wife Hōjō Masako and became the first shikken in 1203, after Yoritomo's death. The shikken was the chief of the mandokoro at that time. Tokimasa became the de facto ruler of the shōgunate by monopolizing decisions for the young shōguns Yoriie and Sanetomo who were the sons of Yoritomo and Masako and thus Tokimasa's maternal grandchildren, executing whoever got in his way, family or not. Yoriie and his son Ichiman were murdered on Tokimasa's orders after he replaced the strong minded Yoriie with his weak minded younger brother Sanetomo as shōgun.

Tokimasa's son Yoshitoki strengthened the position of shikken by integrating it with the post of Samurai-dokoro, after annihilating the powerful Wada clan, who had dominated the latter position. The shikken became the highest post, controlling puppet shōguns in practice. In 1224, Yoshitoki's son Hōjō Yasutoki set up the position of rensho (cosigner), or assistant regent.

=== Shikken as tokusō subordinate (1256–1333) ===
Hōjō Tokiyori separated the two posts of tokusō (initially head of the Hōjō clan) and shikken in 1256. He installed Hōjō Nagatoki as shikken while designating his son Tokimune to succeed as tokusō. Effective power was moved from shikken to tokusō. Tokimune, contemporaneous with Mongol invasions of Japan, at one point personally occupied all 3 most powerful posts of the shogunate, and thus Japan: tokusō, shikken, and rensho.

== List of shikken ==
1. Hōjō Tokimasa (r. 1199–1205)
2. Hōjō Yoshitoki (r. 1205–1224)
3. Hōjō Yasutoki (r. 1224–1242)
4. Hōjō Tsunetoki (r. 1242–1246)
5. Hōjō Tokiyori (r. 1246–1256)
6. Hōjō Nagatoki (r. 1256–1264)
7. Hōjō Masamura (r. 1264–1268)
8. Hōjō Tokimune (r. 1268–1284)
9. Hōjō Sadatoki (r. 1284–1301)
10. Hōjō Morotoki (r. 1301–1311)
11. Hōjō Munenobu (r. 1311–1312)
12. Hōjō Hirotoki (r. 1312–1315)
13. Hōjō Mototoki (r. 1315–1316)
14. Hōjō Takatoki (r. 1316–1326)
15. Hōjō Sadaaki (r. 1326)
16. Hōjō Moritoki (r. 1326–1333)
17. Hōjō Sadayuki (r. 1333)

== See also ==
- Rokuhara Tandai
