= Kamakura shogunate =

Government of Japan (1192–1333)

Coordinates: 35°19′N 139°33′E

Kamakura shogunate 鎌倉幕府 Kamakura bakufu
- 1192–1333
- Mon of the Minamoto clan, of which the Seiwa Genji were a branch

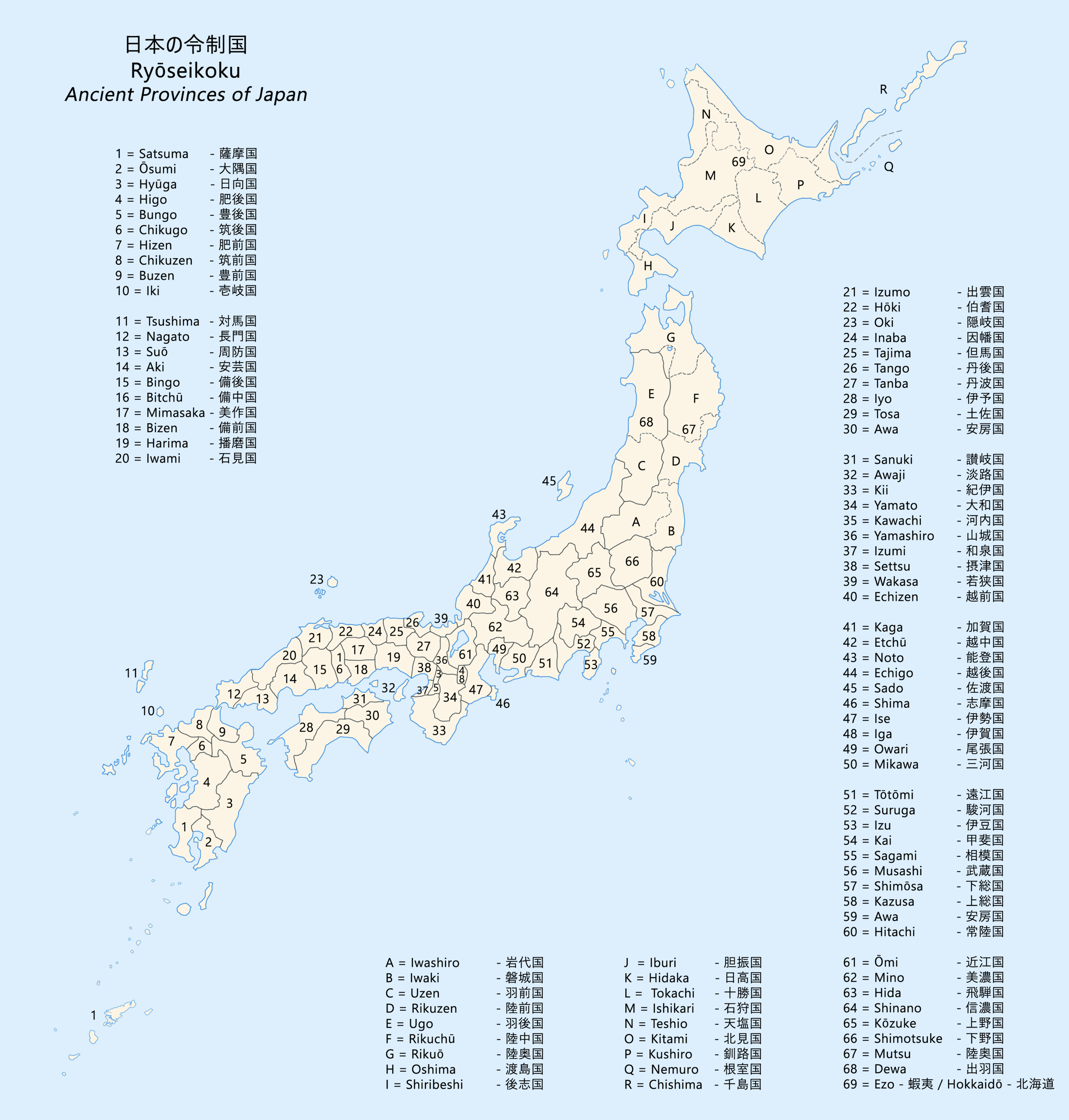
- Provinces of Japan during Kamakura period (1185)
- Capital: Heian-kyō (Emperor's palace); Kamakura (Shōgun's residence)
- Common languages: Late Middle Japanese
- Religion: Shinbutsu-shūgō; Japanese Buddhism; —Zen Buddhism; —True Pure Land; —Nichiren Buddhism
- Government: Monarchy under a diarchial (Note: With civil power in Kyoto and military power in Kamakura sharing authority for governing the nation.) feudal hereditary stratocracy under a hereditary regency (from 1199)
- Emperor
  - 1183–1198: Go-Toba
  - 1318–1339: Go-Daigo
- Shōgun
  - 1192–1199: Minamoto no Yoritomo
  - 1308–1333: Prince Morikuni
- Shikken
  - 1199–1205: Hōjō Tokimasa
  - 1326–1333: Hōjō Moritoki
- History
  - Minamoto no Yoritomo appointed shogun: August 21, 1192
  - Battle of Dan-no-ura: April 25, 1185
  - Hōjō regency established: 1203
  - Siege of Kamakura: May 18, 1333
- Currency: Ryō
Preceded by	Succeeded by
Heian period	Kenmu Restoration

The Kamakura shogunate (Japanese: 鎌倉幕府, Hepburn: Kamakura bakufu) was the feudal military government of Japan during the Kamakura period from 1185 to 1333.

The Kamakura shogunate was established by Minamoto no Yoritomo after victory in the Genpei War and appointing himself as shōgun. Yoritomo governed Japan autocratically from the eastern city of Kamakura with the emperor of Japan and his Imperial Court in the official capital city of Heian-kyō (Kyoto) as figureheads. The Kamakura shōguns were members of the Minamoto clan until 1226, the Fujiwara clan until 1252, and the last six were minor princes of the imperial family. The Hōjō clan were the de facto rulers of Japan as shikken (regent) of the shōgun from 1203. The Kamakura shogunate saw the Jōkyū War in 1221 and the Mongol invasions of Japan under Kublai Khan in 1274 and 1281. The Kamakura shogunate was overthrown in the Kenmu Restoration under Emperor Go-Daigo in 1333, re-establishing Imperial rule until Ashikaga Takauji and his offspring overthrew the imperial government and founded the Ashikaga shogunate in 1336 (Nanboku-chō period).

There are various theories as to the year in which the Kamakura period and Kamakura shogunate began. In the past, the most popular theory was that the year was 1192, when Minamoto no Yoritomo was appointed Seii Taishōgun (征夷大将軍). Later, the prevailing theory was that the year was 1185, when Yoritomo established the shugo, which controlled military and police power in various regions, and the jitō, which was in charge of tax collection and land administration. Japanese history textbooks as of 2016 do not specify a year for the beginning of the Kamakura period, as there are various theories about the year the Kamakura shogunate was established.

== History ==
=== Establishment ===
Historically in Japan, the power of civilian government was primarily held by the ruling emperor of Japan and their regents, typically appointed from the ranks of the Imperial Court and the aristocratic clans that vied for influence there. Military affairs were handled under the auspices of the civil government.

From 1180 to 1185, the Genpei War was fought between the Taira and Minamoto clans as part of a longstanding violent rivalry for influence over the Emperor and his court. Minamoto no Yoritomo defeated the Taira clan, but in his victory seized power from the civil aristocracy, politically relegating the Emperor and his court to symbolic figureheads. In 1192, Yoritomo and the Minamoto clan established a military government in Kamakura.

=== The Hōjō Regency ===
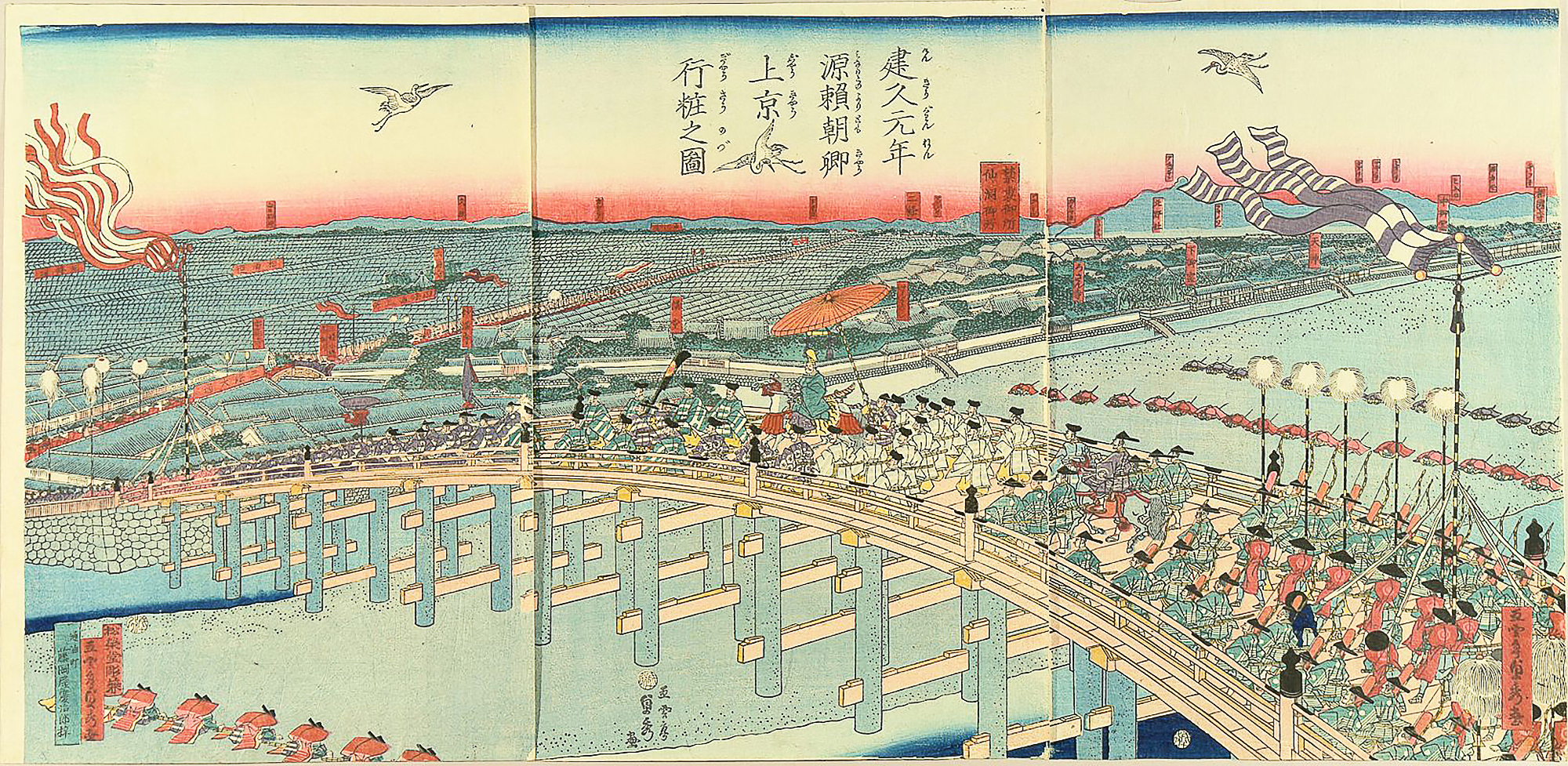
Minamoto no Yoritomo's procession goes to Kyoto during the early Kamakura Shogunate period.

Yoritomo unexpectedly died in an accident in 1199, leaving the Minamoto clan weakened. Hōjō Tokimasa, the father of Yoritomo's widow, Hōjō Masako, and former guardian and protector of Yoritomo, claimed the title of regent (shikken) to Yoritomo's son Minamoto no Yoriie, eventually making that claim hereditary to the Hōjō clan. At the same time, Hōjō Masako maneuvered herself into such a powerful, albeit informal, position that people began calling her the "nun shogun" in the place of her son Yoriie. As Minamoto no Yoriie grew older, however, he attempted to exert real power, resulting in a power struggle with the Hōjō clan of his own mother. These conflicts caused considerable tensions within the shogunate. In 1201, the Jo clan unsuccessfully attempted to overthrow the Minamoto clan in the Kennin Rebellion. Eventually, Tokimasa deposed Yoriie, backed up his younger brother, Minamoto no Sanetomo, as a new shōgun, and assumed the post of shikken. Sanetomo was only twelve at this point, and accordingly power factually rested with his mother Hōjō Masako. The Minamoto remained the titular shōguns, with the Hōjō holding the real power. In 1204, loyalists of Yoriie attempted an uprising to topple the Hōjō domination, but the latter defeated the rebels and assassinated Yoriie.

In 1205, Hōjō Tokimasa attempted to depose Sanetomo, hoping to install his son-in-law as new shogun. However, his daughter Hōjō Masako saw this as threat to her own status; she arranged the pretender's murder and banished her father to a monastery. In 1219, Sanetomo was assassinated by his nephew Kugyō. Since Sanetomo died childless, the line of shōguns from the Minamoto clan ended with him. From this point onwards, the Hōjō were in total control. With Sanetomo's death in 1219, his mother Hōjō Masako continued to serve as the shogunate's real center of power. As long as she lived, regents and shōguns would come and go, while she stayed at the helm. Since the Hōjō family did not have the rank to nominate a shōgun from among its members, Masako had to find a convenient puppet. The problem was solved by choosing Kujo Yoritsune, a distant relation of the Minamoto, who would be the fourth shōgun and figurehead, while Hōjō Yoshitoki would take care of day-to-day business. However powerless, future shōguns would always be chosen from either Fujiwara or imperial lineage to keep the bloodline pure and give legitimacy to the rule. This succession proceeded for more than a century.

As a result, the Kamakura shogunate rested on an unusual pyramid of regents and de facto usurpation: The true rulers, namely the Hōjō regents, had usurped power from the Minamoto, who had usurped it from the Emperor, descending from Emperor Kōkō, who usurped it from the children of Emperor Seiwa. At the same time, the regents, shoguns, and emperors all still maintained their nominal positions and existed alongside each other. The regime nonetheless proved to be stable enough to last a total of 135 years, 9 shōguns and 16 regents.

In 1221, Emperor Go-Toba tried to regain power in what would be called the Jōkyū War, but the attempt failed. The power of the Hōjō remained unchallenged until 1324, when Emperor Go-Daigo orchestrated a plot to overthrow them, but the plot was discovered almost immediately and foiled.

=== Mongol invasions ===
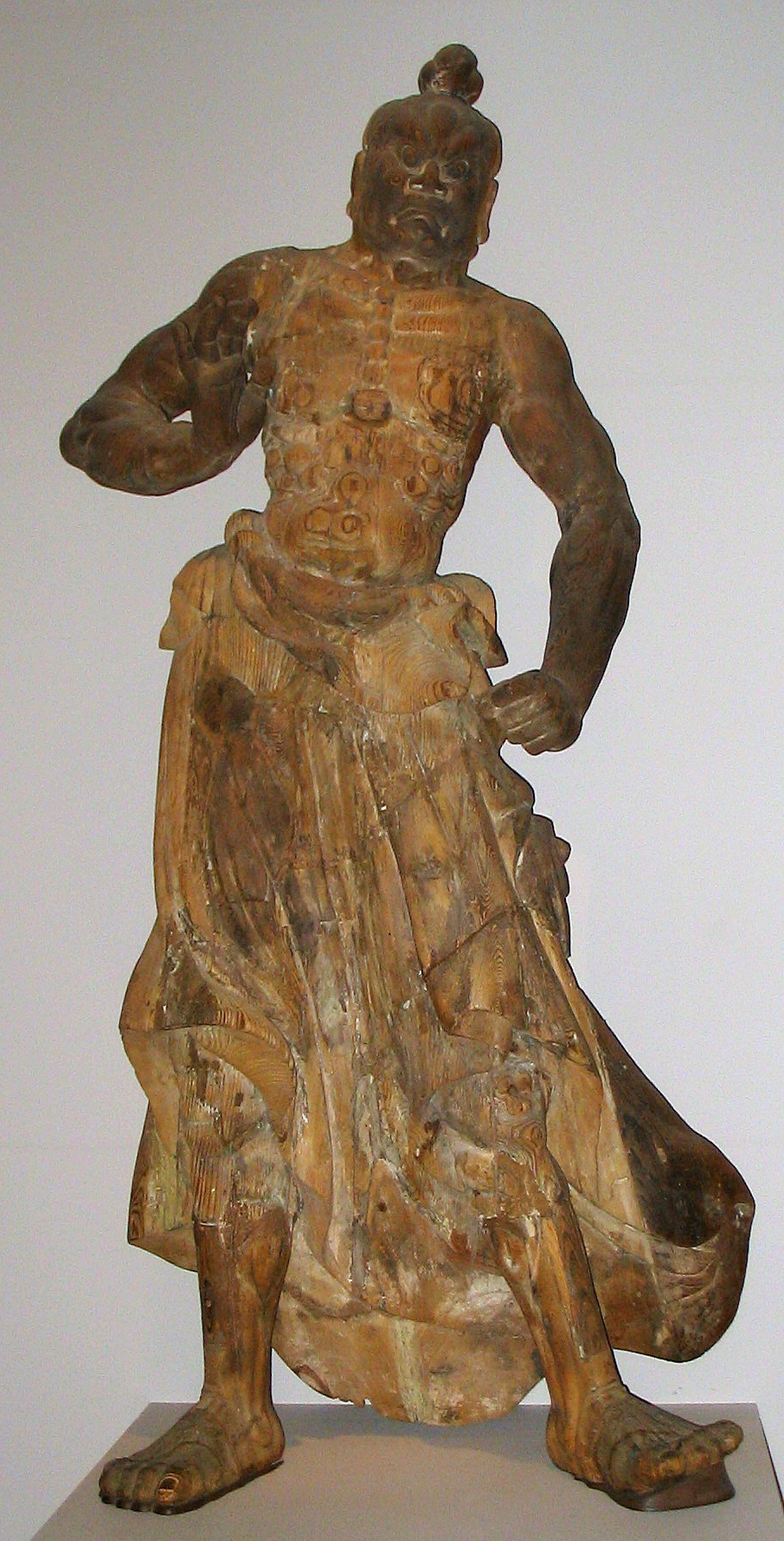
A wooden Kongorikishi (Nio) created during the 14th-century at a temple in Sakai, Osaka

The Mongols under Kublai Khan attempted sea-borne invasions in 1274 and 1281.

Fifty years before, the shogunate had agreed to Korean demands that the wokou be dealt with to stop their raids, and this bit of good diplomacy had created a cooperative relationship between the two states, such that the Koreans, helpless with a Mongol occupation army garrisoning their country, had sent much intelligence information to Japan, so that along with messages from Japanese spies in the Korean peninsula, the shogunate had a good picture of the situation of the pending Mongol invasion. The shogunate had rejected Kublai's demands to submit with contempt. The Mongol landings of 1274 met with some success, however there was no rout of the Japanese defenders, who in any case greatly outnumbered the 40,000 combined invasion force of Mongols and Korean conscripts. Noting an impending storm, the Korean admirals advised the Mongols to re-embark so that the fleet could be protected away from shore; however, the typhoon was so destructive that one-third of the Mongol force was destroyed.

After the surviving forces returned to Mongol territory, Kublai was not dissuaded from his intentions of bringing Japan under Mongol control, and once again sent a message demanding submission, which infuriated the Hōjō leadership, who had the messengers executed. They responded with decisive action for defense—a wall was built to protect the hinterland of Hakata Bay, defensive posts were established, garrison lists were drawn up, regular manning of the home provinces was redirected to the western defenses, and ships were constructed to harass the invaders' fleet when they appeared.

The Mongols returned in 1281 with a force of some 50,000 Mongol-Korean-Chinese along with some 100,000 conscripts from the defeated Song empire in south China. This force embarked and fought the Japanese for some seven weeks at several locations in Kyushu, but the defenders held, and the Mongols made no strategic headway. Again, a typhoon approached, and the Koreans and Chinese re-embarked the combined Mongol invasion forces in an attempt to deal with the storm in the open sea. At least one-third of the Mongol force was destroyed, and perhaps half of the conscripted Song forces to the south over a two-day period of August 15–16. Thousands of invading troops were not able to embark in time and were slaughtered by the samurai. Such losses in men, material, and the exhaustion of the Korean state in provisioning the two invasions put an end to the Mongols' attempts to conquer Japan. The "divine wind", or kamikaze, was credited for saving Japan from foreign invasion.

For two further decades the Kamakura shogunate maintained a watch in case the Mongols attempted another invasion. However, the strain on the military and the financial expenditures weakened the regime considerably. Additionally, the defensive war left no gains to distribute to the warriors who had fought it, leading to discontent. Construction of defensive walls added further expenses to the strained regime.

=== Decline and fall ===
In 1331, Emperor Go-Daigo took arms against Kamakura, but was defeated by Kamakura's Ashikaga Takauji and exiled to Oki Island, in today's Shimane Prefecture. A warlord then went to the exiled emperor's rescue, and in response the Hōjō sent forces again commanded by Takauji to attack Kyoto. Once there, however, Takauji decided to switch sides and support Go-Daigo. At the same time another warlord loyal to the emperor, Nitta Yoshisada, attacked Kamakura and took it. About 870 Hōjō clan members, including the last three regents, committed suicide at their family temple, Tōshō-ji, whose ruins were found in today's Ōmachi.

In 1336, Ashikaga Takauji assumed the position of shōgun himself, establishing the Ashikaga shogunate.

== Institutions ==
The Kamakura shogunate functioned within the framework of the Heian system of Imperial rule.

Yoritomo established a chancellery, or mandokoro, as his principal organ of government. Later, under the Hōjō, a separate institution, the hyōjōshū became the focus of government.

The shogunate appointed new military governors (shugo) over the provinces/states. These were selected mostly from powerful families in the different provinces, or the title was bestowed upon a general and his family after a successful campaign. Although they managed their own affairs, in theory they were still obliged to the central government through their allegiance to the shōgun. The military governors paralleled the existing system of governors and vice-governors (kokushi) appointed by the civil government in Kyoto.

Kamakura also appointed stewards, or jitō, to positions in the manors (shōen). These stewards received revenues from the manors in return for their military service. They served along with the holders of similar office, gesu, who delivered dues from the manor to the proprietor in Kyoto. Thus the dual governmental system reached to the manor level.

In legal matters, the government promulgated a legal code called Goseibai Shikimoku in 1232 which would continuously be used until the Muromachi period. A court of appeals was also set up during this period, called the Moncho-jo.

== List of Kamakura shōguns ==
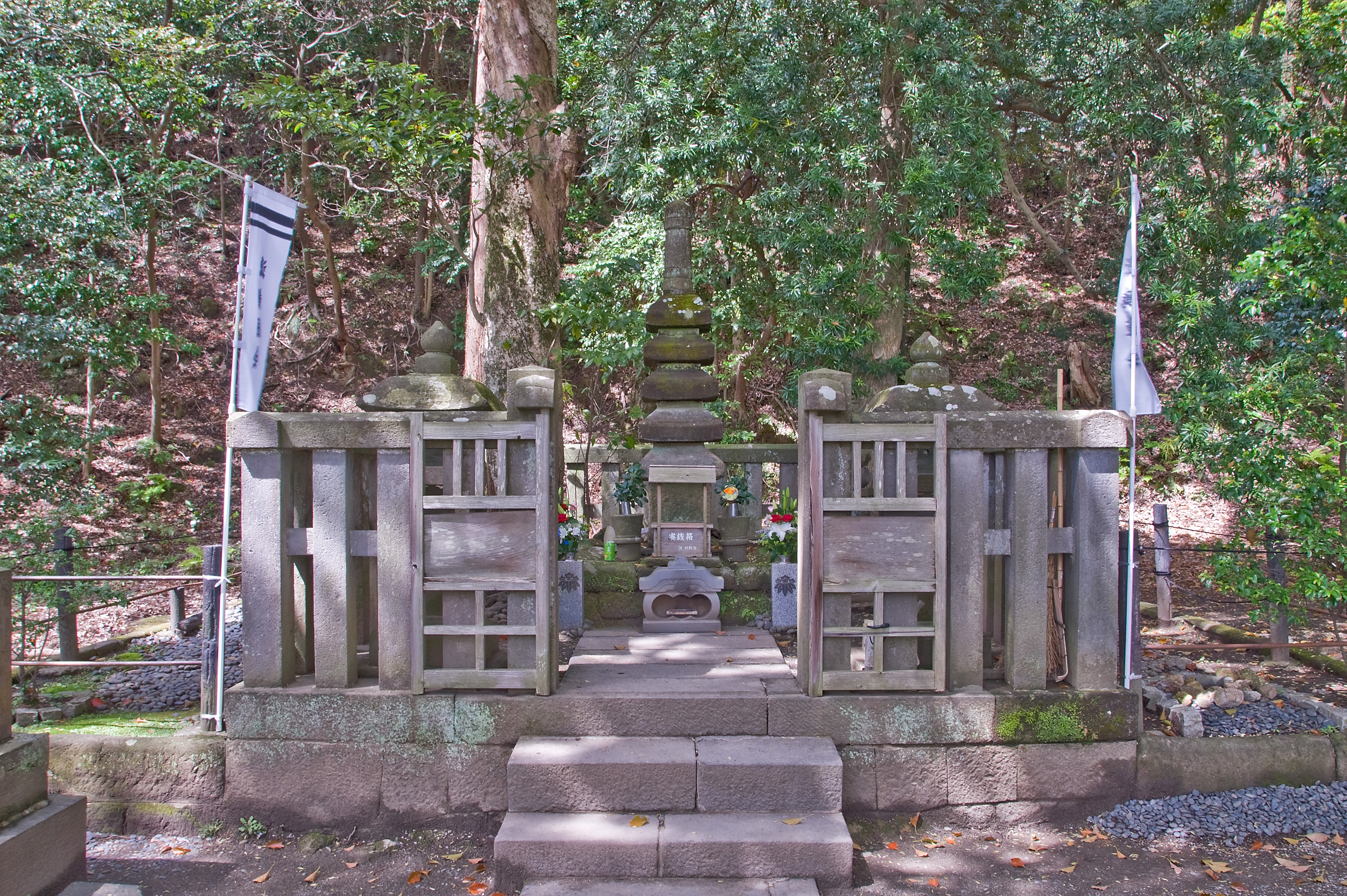
Grave of Minamoto no Yoritomo

1. Minamoto no Yoritomo, r. 1192–1199
2. Minamoto no Yoriie, r. 1202–1203
3. Minamoto no Sanetomo, r. 1203–1219
4. Fujiwara no Yoritsune, r. 1226–1244
5. Fujiwara no Yoritsugu, r. 1244–1252
6. Prince Munetaka, r. 1252–1266
7. Prince Koreyasu, r. 1266–1289
8. Prince Hisaaki, r. 1289–1308
9. Prince Morikuni, r. 1308–1333

=== List of Kamakura shikken ===
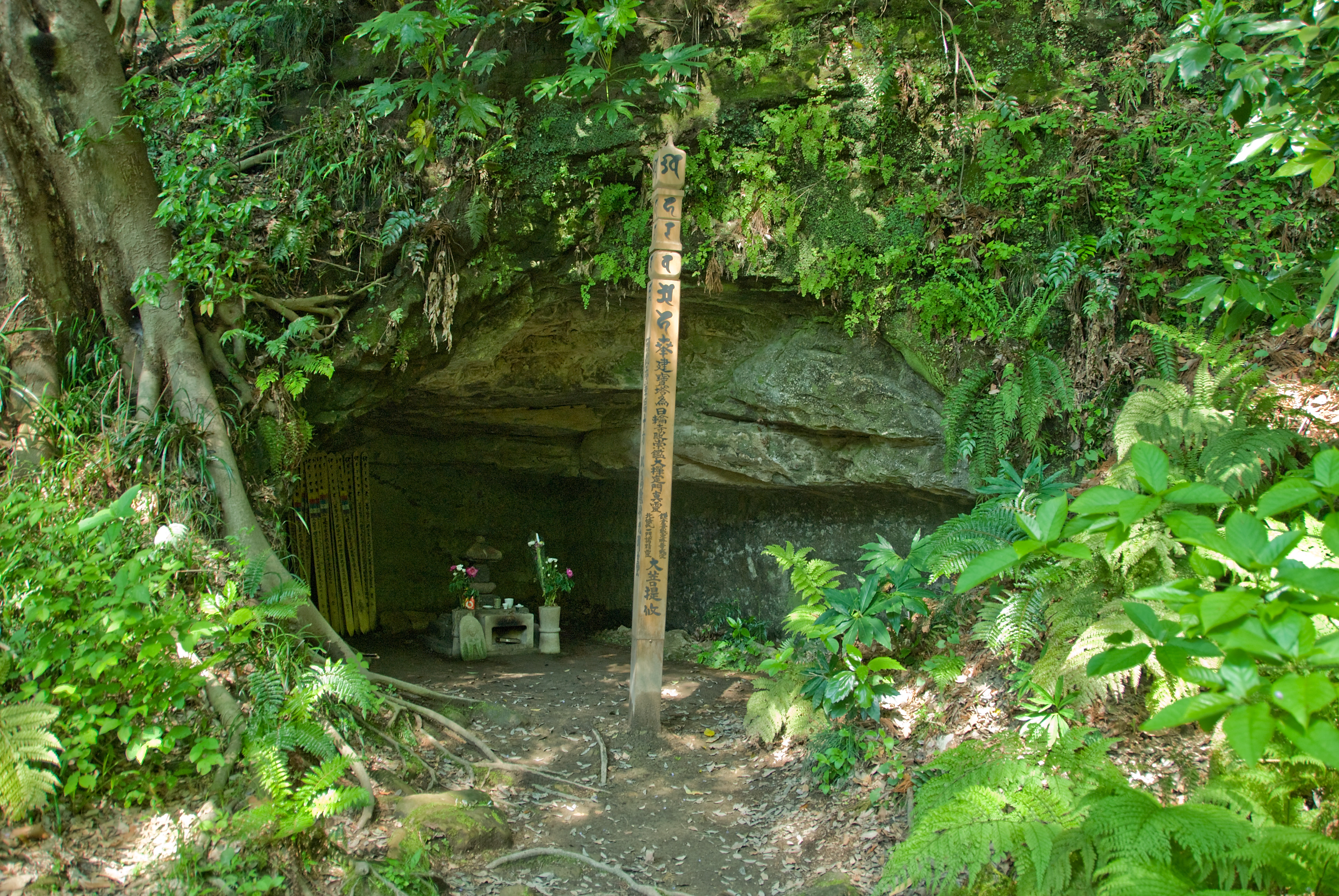
Site of Hōjō Takatoki's death

1. Hōjō Tokimasa, r. 1203–1205
2. Hōjō Yoshitoki, r. 1205–1224
3. Hōjō Yasutoki, r. 1224–1242
4. Hōjō Tsunetoki, r. 1242–1246
5. Hōjō Tokiyori, r. 1246–1256
6. Hōjō Nagatoki, r. 1256–1264
7. Hōjō Masamura, r. 1264–1268
8. Hōjō Tokimune, r. 1268–1284
9. Hōjō Sadatoki, r. 1284–1301
10. Hōjō Morotoki, r. 1301–1311
11. Hōjō Munenobu, r. 1311–1312
12. Hōjō Hirotoki, r. 1312–1315
13. Hōjō Mototoki, r. 1315–1316
14. Hōjō Takatoki, r. 1316–1326
15. Hōjō Sadaaki, r. 1326
16. Hōjō Moritoki, r. 1326–1333
17. Hōjō Sadayuki, r. 1333

=== Genealogy ===
==== Patrilineal descent ====
- Emperor Ninmyō, 54th Emperor (808–850; r. 833–850)
  - Emperor Montoku, 55th Emperor (826–858; r. 850–858)
    - Emperor Seiwa, 56th Emperor (850–878; r. 858–876)
      - Imperial Prince Sadasumi (873–916)
        - Minamoto no Tsunemoto (894–961)
          - Minamoto no Mitsunaka (912–997)
            - Minamoto no Yorinobu (968–1048)
              - Minamoto no Yoriyoshi (988–1075)
                - Minamoto no Yoshiie (1039–1106)
                  - Minamoto no Tameyoshi (1096–1156)
                    - Minamoto no Yoshitomo (1123–1160)
                      - I. Minamoto no Yoritomo, 1st Kamakura shōgun (1147–1199; r. 1192–1199)
                        - II. Minamoto no Yoriie, 2nd Kamakura shōgun (1182–1204; r. 1202–1203)
                        - III. Minamoto no Sanetomo, 3rd Kamakura shōgun (1192–1219; r. 1203–1219)
                  - Minamoto no Yoshikuni (1091–1155)
                    - Minamoto (Ashikaga) no Yoshiyasu (1127–1157)
                      - Ashikaga Yoshikane (c. 1154–1199)
                        - Ashikaga Yoshiuji (1189–1255)
                          - Ashikaga Yasuuji (1216–1270)
                            - Ashikaga Yoshiuji (1240–1262)
                              - Ashikaga Ietoki (1260–1284)
                                - Ashikaga Sadauji (c. 1277–1331)
                                  - Ashikaga Takauji, founder of the Ashikaga shogunate
  - Emperor Kōkō, 58th Emperor (830–887; r. 884–887)
    - Emperor Uda, 59th Emperor (867–931; r. 887–897)
      - Emperor Daigo, 60th Emperor (884–930; r. 897–930)
        - Emperor Murakami, 62nd Emperor (926–967; r. 946–967)
          - Emperor En'yū, 64th Emperor (959–991; r. 969–984)
            - Emperor Ichijō, 66th Emperor (980–1011; r. 986–1011)
              - Emperor Go-Suzaku, 69th Emperor (1009–1045; r. 1036–1045)
                - Emperor Go-Sanjō, 71st Emperor (1034–1073; r. 1068–1073)
                  - Emperor Shirakawa, 72nd Emperor (1053–1129; r. 1073–1087)
                    - Emperor Horikawa, 73rd Emperor (1078–1107; r. 1087–1107)
                      - Emperor Toba, 74th Emperor (1103–1156; r. 1107–1123)
                        - Emperor Go-Shirakawa, 77th Emperor (1127–1192; r. 1155–1158)
                          - Emperor Takakura, 80th Emperor (1161–1181; r. 1168–1180)
                            - Emperor Go-Toba, 82nd Emperor (1180–1239; r. 1183–1198)
                              - Emperor Tsuchimikado, 83rd Emperor (1196–1231; r. 1198–1210)
                                - Emperor Go-Saga, 88th Emperor (1220–1272; r. 1242–1246)
                                  - VI. Imperial Prince Munetaka, 6th Kamakura shōgun (1242–1274; r. 1252–1266)
                                    - VII. Imperial Prince Koreyasu, 7th Kamakura shōgun (1264–1326; r. 1266–1289)
                                  - Emperor Go-Fukakusa, 89th Emperor (1243–1304; r. 1246–1260)
                                    - VIII. Imperial Prince Hisaaki, 8th Kamakura shōgun (1276–1328; r. 1289–1308)
                                      - IX. Imperial Prince Morikuni, 9th Kamakura shōgun (1301–1333; r. 1308–1333)
                                  - Emperor Kameyama, 90th Emperor (1249–1305; r. 1259–1274)
                                    - Emperor Go-Uda, 91st Emperor (1267–1324; r. 1274–1287)
                                      - Emperor Go-Daigo, 96th Emperor (1288–1339; r. 1318–1339)
                                        - Imperial Prince Moriyoshi, 1st Kenmu shōgun (1308–1335; r. 1333)
                                        - Imperial Prince Narinaga, 2nd Kenmu shōgun (1326–1338?/1344?; r. 1334–1336)

==== Family Tree ====
(1147–1199); Minamoto no Yoritomo^{(1)} r. 1192–1199	(d. 1190); Bōmon Hime	(1147-1197); Ichijō Yoshiyasu
(1182–1204); Minamoto no Yoriie^{(2)} r. 1202–1203	(1192–1219); Minamoto no Sanetomo^{(3)} r. 1203–1219	(1169–1206); Kujō Yoshitsune	(1167-1200); Daughter of Ichijō Yoshiyasu	(d. 1227); Ichijō Zenshi	(1171-1244); Saionji Kintsune
(1198–1203); Minamoto no Ichiman	(1200–1219); Kugyō	(1193–1252); Kujō Michiie	(1192–1253); Saionji Rinshi	(1194-1269); Saionji Saneuji
(1202–1234); Minamoto no Yoshiko	(1218–1256); Kujō Yoritsune^{(4)} r. 1226–1244	Omiya no Tsubone daughter of Fujiwara no Chikayoshi	(b. 1211); Kujō Jinshi	(1210-1259); Konoe Kanetsune	(d. 1308); Taira no Muneko	(1220–1272); Emperor Go-Saga	(1225-1292); Saionji Kisshi
(1239–1256); Kujō Yoritsugu^{(5)} r. 1244–1252	(b. 1241); Konoe Saishi	(1242–1274); Prince Munetaka^{(6)} r. 1252–1266	(1243-1304); Emperor Go-Fukakusa
(1264–1326); Prince Koreyasu^{(7)} r. 1266–1289
Daughter of Prince Koreyasu	(1276–1328); Prince Hisaaki^{(8)} r. 1289–1308
(1301–1333); Prince Morikuni^{(9)} r. 1308–1333

== See also ==
- Rensho
- Rokuhara Tandai
- History of Japan
- Lists of incumbents
- Azuma Kagami
- Mongol invasions of Japan
- Goryeo military regime
