= The 13 Lords of the Shogun =

2022 taiga drama about Hōjō Yoshitoki

- Promotional poster
- Written by: Kōki Mitani
- Directed by: Teruyuki Yoshida and others
- Starring: Shun Oguri; Yui Aragaki; Masaki Suda; Eiko Koike; Kentaro Sakaguchi; Kōji Seto; Taishi Nakagawa; Mayu Hotta; Eiji Yokota; Shin'ya Niiro; Emma Miyazawa; Yoshihiro Nozoe; Daichi Kaneko; Hayato Kakizawa; Onoe Matsuya II; Rinko Kikuchi; Nakamura Shidō II; Jiro Sato; Mitsuko Kusabue; Jun Kunimura; Bandō Yajūrō; Koji Yamamoto; Rie Miyazawa; Koichi Sato; Yo Oizumi; Toshiyuki Nishida
- Narrated by: Masami Nagasawa
- Theme music composer: Evan Call
- Composer: Evan Call
- Country of origin: Japan
- Original language: Japanese
- No. of episodes: 48

Production
- Running time: 45 minutes

Original release
- Network: NHK
- Release: January 9 – December 18, 2022

The 13 Lords of the Shogun (鎌倉殿の13人; Kamakura-dono no Jūsan-nin) is a Japanese historical drama television series starring Shun Oguri as Hōjō Yoshitoki. The series is the 61st NHK taiga drama.

== Cast ==
=== Starring role ===
- Shun Oguri as Hōjō Yoshitoki. Kōki Mitani pointed out some similarities between him and Michael Corleone.

=== Hōjō clan ===
- Eiko Koike as Hōjō Masako, Yoshitoki's older sister
- Bandō Yajūrō as Hōjō Tokimasa, Yoshitoki's father
- Rie Miyazawa as Maki no Kata, a.k.a. Riku, Yoshitoki's stepmother
- Kataoka Ainosuke VI as Hōjō Munetoki, Yoshitoki's older brother
- Emma Miyazawa as Awa no Tsubone, a.k.a. Mii, Yoshitoki's younger sister
- Kentaro Sakaguchi as Hōjō Yasutoki, Yoshitoki and Yae's son
  - Yurito Mori as Kongō (young Yasutoki)
- Momoko Fukuchi as Hatsu, Yasutoki's wife
- Kōji Seto as Hōjō Tokifusa, Yoshitoki's younger brother
- Mayu Hotta as Hina, a.k.a. Hime no Mae, Yoshitoki's second wife
- Takeru Nishimoto (Super Size Me) as Hōjō Tomotoki, Yoshitoki and Hina's son
- Rinko Kikuchi as Noe, a.k.a. Iga no Kata, Yoshitoki's third wife
- Taisuke Niihara as Hōjō Masamura, Yoshitoki and Noe's son
- Tsubasa Nakagawa as Hōjō Masanori, Yoshitoki's half-brother
- Rikako Yagi as Kiku, Yoshitoki's half-sister
- Ichika Osaki as Aki, Yoshitoki's half-sister
- Masaki Murakami as Inage Shigenari, Aki's husband
- Hiroyuki Takagishi (Timon D) as Nitta Tadatsune
- Kizuki as Tsurumaru (later known as Taira no Moritsuna)
  - Haruto Satō as young Tsurumaru
- Takashi Yamanaka as Hiraga Tomomasa

=== Minamoto clan ===
- Yo Oizumi as Minamoto no Yoritomo, Masako's husband and the first shogun of the Kamakura shogunate.
- Masaki Suda as Minamoto no Yoshitsune, Yoritomo's younger brother
- So Kaku as Benkei
- Shizuka Ishibashi as Shizuka Gozen, Yoshitsune's mistress
- Tōko Miura as Sato, Yoshitsune's wife
- Daichi Kaneko as Minamoto no Yoriie, the second shogun
  - Sōma Torigoe as Manju (young Yoriie)
- Kana Kita as Tsutsuji, Yoriie's wife
- Kasumi Yamaya as Setsu, a.k.a. Lady Wakasa, Yoriie's concubine
- Sōta Aizawa as Ichiman
- Hayato Kakizawa as Minamoto no Sanetomo, the third shogun
  - Kiara Minegishi as Senman (young Sanetomo)
- Konatsu Kato as Chiyo, Sanetomo's wife
- Sara Minami as Ōhime
  - Miyuko Ochii as young Ōhime
- Yuno Ōta as Sanman
- Kanichiro as Kōgyō, commonly known as Kugyō.
  - Rinto Takahira as Zenzai (young Kōgyō, around 10 years old)
  - Tsubasa Nagao as Zenzai (young Kōgyō, around 5 years old)
- Takaya Sakoda as Minamoto no Noriyori
- Shin'ya Niiro as Ano Zenjō
- Kaito Kobayashi as Ano Raizen
- Yūsaku Mori as Ano Tokimoto
- Tetta Sugimoto as Minamoto no Yukiie
- Noriko Eguchi as Kame
- Songha as Gien

Shinano

- Munetaka Aoki as Kiso Yoshinaka
- Ichikawa Somegorō VIII as Kiso Yoshitaka
- Sayaka Akimoto as Tomoe Gozen
- Yū Machida as Imai Kanehira

Kai

- Norito Yashima as Takeda Nobuyoshi
- Kou Maehara as Ichijō Tadayori

=== The 13 lords of the Shogun (other than Yoshitoki and Tokimasa) ===
- Jiro Sato as Hiki Yoshikazu
- Nakamura Shidō II as Kajiwara Kagetoki
- Yoshihiro Nozoe as Adachi Morinaga
- Eiji Yokota as Wada Yoshimori
- Hideo Kurihara as Ōe no Hiromoto
- Takashi Kobayashi as Miyoshi Yasunobu
- Hayato Ichihara as Hatta Tomoie
- Yasuhiro Ōno as Adachi Tōmoto
- Jun'ya Kawashima as Nakahara no Chikayoshi
- Isao Nonaka as Nikaidō Yukimasa
- B-saku Satō as Miura Yoshizumi, Yoshimura's father

=== Other eastern samurai and their families ===
Sagami

- Koji Yamamoto as Miura Yoshimura
- Tatsuya Kishida as Miura Taneyoshi
- Taiga Komie as Komawaka-maru (later known as Miura Mitsumura)
- Jun Kunimura as Ōba Kagechika
- Kenji Anan as Doi Sanehira
- Makiya Yamaguchi as Yamanouchisudō Tsunetoshi
- Taka Takao as Okazaki Yoshizane
- Suon Kan as Sasaki Hideyoshi
- Takahiro Kimata as Sasaki Sadatsuna
- Hiroki Ezawa as Sasaki Tsunetaka
- Kazuya Masuda as Sasaki Moritsuna
- Tsuyoshi Mitera as Sasaki Takatsuna
- Hiroaki Hirata as Satake Yoshimasa
- Reiya Masaki as Kajiwara Kagesue
- Eishin as Asahina Yoshihide
- Masaki Naitō as Wada Yoshinao
- Yūdai Hayashi as Wada Yoshishige
- Gaku Hosokawa as Wada Tanenaga

Izu

- Kazuyuki Asano as Itō Sukechika
- Terunosuke Takezai as Itō Sukekiyo
- Yui Aragaki as Yae, Yoritomo's first wife and Yoshitoki's first wife.
- Keisei Ōta as Sentsurumaru
- Zen Kajihara as Zenji, an assassin
- Chihiro Yamamoto as Tō
  - Airi Takahashi as young Tō
- Yoshiyuki Tsubokura (Wagaya) as Kudō Suketsune
- Takato Yonemoto as Kudō Shigemitsu
- Yoshiyuki Yamaguchi as Kawazu Sukeyasu
- Kazuya Tanabe as Soga Jūrō
  - Eishi Ōfuji as Ichiman (young Jūrō)
- Shunsuke Tanaka as Soga Gorō
  - Kōki Kagaya as Hako'ō (young Gorō)
- Tateto Serizawa as Ema Jirō, Yae's second husband
- Kazutoyo Yoshimi as Tsusumi Nobutō
- Takuma Nagao as Tōnai Mitsuzumi

Musashi

- Taishi Nakagawa as Hatakeyama Shigetada
- Mei Fukuda as Chie, Yoshitoki's half-sister and Shigetada's wife.
- Rairu Sugita as Hatakeyama Shigeyasu
- Keiko Horiuchi as Michi
- Mitsuko Kusabue as Hiki no Ama
- Eiki Narita as Hiki Tokikazu
- Kaito as Hiki Munetomo

Bōsō

- Kōichi Satō as Kazusa Hirotsune
- Nobuto Okamoto as Chiba Tsunetane

Awa

- Manabu Ino as Anzai Kagemasu
- Kōji Kurosawa as Nagasa Tsunetomo
- Manabu Takeuchi (Kaminari) as Gonzō

Others

- Atsushi Nakamura as Oyama Tomomasa
- Nao Takahashi as Yūki Tomomitsu
- Shin Shimizu as Naganuma Munemasa
- Motohiro Niina as Adachi Kagemori
- Eriko Aube as Yū
- Ayumu as Nakano Yoshinari
- Naritada Nishimura as Ogasawara Nagatsune

=== The imperial court ===
- Toshiyuki Nishida as Emperor Go-Shirakawa, the 77th emperor of Japan
- Onoe Matsuya II as Emperor Go-Toba, who initiated the Jōkyū War
  - Rihito Kikui as young Emperor Go-Toba
- Toma Ikuta as Minamoto no Nakaakira
- Kyōka Suzuki as Tango no Tsubone
- Toshihiro Yashiba as Taira no Tomoyasu
- Hajime Yamazaki as Maki Munechika
- Subaru Kimura as Prince Mochihito
- Tōru Shinagawa as Minamoto no Yorimasa
- Chisa Aizawa as Emperor Antoku
  - Mitsunojō Itō as toddler Emperor Antoku
- Takeharu Morimoto as Nakahara no Tomochika
- Naoki Tanaka as Kujō Kanezane
- Kazunari Murakami as Tosanobō Shōshun
- Tomokazu Seki as Tsuchimikado Michichika
- Sylvia Grab as Fujiwara no Kaneko
- Yūya Kido as Ichijō Takayoshi
- Tomoya Hoshi as Fujiwara no Hideyasu
- Myung-joo Inoue as Minamoto no Yorimochi
- Iori Koshida as Mitora

=== Taira clan ===
- Ken Matsudaira as Taira no Kiyomori
- Kyōko Ōtani as Taira no Tokiko
- Kotaro Koizumi as Taira no Munemori
- Shogo Hama as Taira no Koremori
- Kano Ichiki as "Kenshunmon-in" Shigeko
- Kaishi Iwao as Taira no Tomomori
- Yūto Shimada as Taira no Kiyomune

=== Northern Fujiwara ===
- Min Tanaka as Fujiwara no Hidehira
- Yūsuke Hirayama as Fujiwara no Kunihira
- Hiroshi Yamamoto as Fujiwara no Yasuhira
- Mayumi Amano as Toku
- Jun'ichi Kawanami as Fujiwara no Yorihira
- Hiroshi Kobayashi as Kawada Jirō

=== Others ===
- Ichikawa Ennosuke IV as Mongaku
- Tarō Suwa as Mon'yōbō Kakuen
- Kazuyuki Aijima as Unkei
- Kenichi Ogata as the chief priest of Ganjōju-in.
- Koichi Yamadera as Jien
- Gene L. Zheng as Chen Heqing, a.k.a. Chin Nakei
- Shihō Harumi as a doctor
- Shinobu Otake as a Miko
- Sayaka Isoyama as Satsuki
- Jun Matsumoto as Tokugawa Ieyasu

== TV schedule ==
Episode	Title	Directed by	Original airdate	Rating
1	"Ōinaru Kozeriai" (大いなる小競り合い)	Teruyuki Yoshida	January 9, 2022	17.3%
2	"Suke-dono no Hara" (佐殿の腹)	Teruyuki Yoshida	January 16, 2022	14.7%
3	"Kyohei wa Shinchō ni" (挙兵は慎重に)	Sō Suenaga	January 23, 2022	16.2%
4	"Ya no Yukue" (矢のゆくえ)	Sō Suenaga	January 30, 2022	15.4%
5	"Ani tono Yakusoku" (兄との約束)	Teruyuki Yoshida	February 6, 2022	13.4%
6	"Warui Shirase" (悪い知らせ)	Keita Hosaka	February 13, 2022	13.7%
7	"Teki ka, Aruiwa" (敵か、あるいは)	Sō Suenaga	February 20, 2022	14.4%
8	"Iza, Kamakura" (いざ、鎌倉)	Teruyuki Yoshida	February 27, 2022	13.7%
9	"Kessen Zen'ya" (決戦前夜)	Keita Hosaka	March 6, 2022	14.0%
10	"Konkyo naki Jishin" (根拠なき自信)	Daisuke Andō	March 13, 2022	13.6%
11	"Yurusarezaru Uso" (許されざる嘘)	Teruyuki Yoshida	March 20, 2022	13.5%
12	"Kame-no-mae Jiken" (亀の前事件)	Sō Suenaga	March 27, 2022	13.1%
13	"Osananajimi no Kizuna" (幼なじみの絆)	Teruyuki Yoshida	April 3, 2022	12.9%
14	"Miyako no Yoshinaka" (都の義仲)	Daisuke Andō	April 10, 2022	12.1%
15	"Ashigatame no Gishiki" (足固めの儀式)	Keita Hosaka	April 17, 2022	12.9%
16	"Densetsu no Makuake" (伝説の幕開け)	Sō Suenaga	April 24, 2022	12.9%
17	"Jomei to Shukumei" (助命と宿命)	Teruyuki Yoshida	May 1, 2022	12.5%
18	"Dan-no-ura de Matta Otoko" (壇ノ浦で舞った男)	Teruyuki Yoshida	May 8, 2022	12.7%
19	"Hatasenu Gaisen" (果たせぬ凱旋)	Daisuke Andō	May 15, 2022	13.2%
20	"Kaettekita Yoshitsune" (帰ってきた義経)	Keita Hosaka	May 22, 2022	12.8%
21	"Hotoke no Manazashi" (仏の眼差し)	Sō Suenaga	May 29, 2022	13.2%
22	"Yoshitoki no Ikiru Michi" (義時の生きる道)	Satoru Nakaizumi	June 5, 2022	12.9%
23	"Kari to Emono" (狩りと獲物)	Teruyuki Yoshida	June 12, 2022	13.3%
24	"Kawaranu Hito" (変わらぬ人)	Daisuke Andō	June 19, 2022	12.0%
25	"Ten ga Nozonda Otoko" (天が望んだ男)	Teruyuki Yoshida	June 26, 2022	12.2%
26	"Kanashimu Mae ni" (悲しむ前に)	Keita Hosaka	July 3, 2022	12.9%
27	"Kamakura-dono to Jūsan-nin" (鎌倉殿と十三人)	Sō Suenaga	July 17, 2022	11.7%
28	"Meitō no Aruji" (名刀の主)	Daisuke Andō	July 24, 2022	12.9%
29	"Mamanaranu Tama" (ままならぬ玉)	Satoru Nakaizumi	July 31, 2022	11.9%
30	"Zenjō no Kakuritsu" (全成の確率)	Teruyuki Yoshida	August 7, 2022	11.4%
31	"Akirame no Warui Otoko" (諦めの悪い男)	Keita Hosaka	August 14, 2022	12.1%
32	"Wazawai no Tane" (災いの種)	Teruyuki Yoshida	August 21, 2022	11.8%
33	"Shuzen-ji" (修善寺)	Sō Suenaga	August 28, 2022	10.2%
34	"Risō no Kekkon" (理想の結婚)	Satoru Nakaizumi	September 4, 2022	11.9%
35	"Nigai Sakazuki" (苦い盃)	Keita Hosaka	September 11, 2022	11.2%
36	"Bushi no Kagami" (武士の鑑)	Sō Suenaga	September 18, 2022	12.4%
37	"Onberebunbinba" (オンベレブンビンバ)	Naoki Kobayashi	September 25, 2022	12.6%
38	"Toki wo Tsugu Mono" (時を継ぐ者)	Teruyuki Yoshida	October 2, 2022	11.7%
39	"Odayaka na Ichinichi" (穏やかな一日)	Keita Hosaka	October 16, 2022	12.0%
40	"Wana to Wana" (罠と罠)	Satoru Nakaizumi	October 23, 2022	11.3%
41	"Yoshimori, Omae ni Tsumi wa Nai" (義盛、お前に罪はない)	Teruyuki Yoshida	October 30, 2022	11.3%
42	"Yume no Yukue" (夢のゆくえ)	Sō Suenaga	November 6, 2022	11.3%
43	"Shikaku to Shikaku" (資格と死角)	Teruyuki Yoshida and Hitoshi Matsumoto	November 13, 2022	11.5%
44	"Shinpan no Hi" (審判の日)	Keita Hosaka	November 20, 2022	11.0%
45	"Hachimangū no Kaidan" (八幡宮の階段)	Daisuke Andō	November 27, 2022	6.2%
46	"Shōgun ni Natta Onna" (将軍になった女)	Sō Suenaga	December 4, 2022	11.3%
47	"Aru Chōteki, Aru Enzetsu" (ある朝敵、ある演説)	Teruyuki Yoshida and Takahiro Yaguchi	December 11, 2022	11.9%
48	"Mukui no Toki" (報いの時)	Teruyuki Yoshida	December 18, 2022	14.8%
Average rating 12.7% - Rating is based on Japanese Video Research (Kantō region).

=== Omnibus ===
Episode	Original airdate	Original airtime
1	December 29, 2022	13:05 - 14:15
2	December 29, 2022	14:15 - 15:20
3	December 29, 2022	15:25 - 16:31
4	December 29, 2022	16:31 - 17:40

== Awards and nominations ==
Year	Award	Category	Recipient	Result	Ref.
2023	16th Tokyo Drama Awards	Best Domestic Series	The 13 Lords of the Shogun	Nominated	
2023	16th Tokyo Drama Awards	Best Actor	Shun Oguri	Won	
