= Hiki clan =

Hiki 比企
- Home province: Musashi
- Parent house: Fujiwara clan
- Titles: Shugo
- Founder: Hiki Yoshitaka
- Final ruler: Hiki Yoshikazu
- Founding year: Unknown
- Dissolution: 1203

The Hiki clan (比企氏, Hiki-shi) was a Japanese samurai family descending from the Fujiwara clan. As close retainers of shogun Minamoto no Yoritomo, they served the Kamakura shogunate during the early Kamakura period, wielding considerable power. However, after they came into conflict with the Hōjō clan, the clan was ultimately destroyed.

== Origins ==
The Hiki clan was a branch of the Fujiwara clan, a powerful family of Japanese regents and court nobility, founded by Fujiwara no Kamatari in the 7th century. They descended through Fujiwara no Hidesato's lineage of the Fujiwara Hokke. The clan originated in Hiki, Musashi Province (present-day Hiki District and Higashimatsuyama, Saitama Prefecture), and was founded by Hiki Yoshitaka.

== History ==
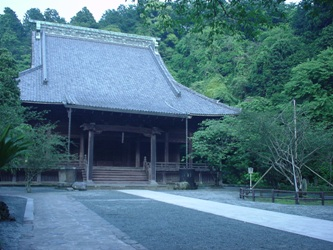
Myōhon-ji temple, the ancestral temple of the Hiki clan

The Hiki clan is considered to have been in close service of the Minamoto clan since the Minamoto clan had been in the capital city of Kyoto. When the Minamoto clan was exiled to Izu Province from Kyoto in 1160, Hiki Kamon-no-jō established himself as acting governor (ukesho) in Hiki, Musashi Province and moved there from Kyoto with his wife Hiki no Ama. Hiki no Ama became the wet nurse of the future shogun Minamoto no Yoritomo, and devoted herself to servicing the Minamoto clan.

Hiki no Ama's adopted son, Hiki Yoshikazu, rose to arms during the Genpei War, and fought for the Minamoto clan. Yoshikazu distinguished himself during the war under Yoritomo.

Hiki clan is seen serving as Governor (shugo) of Hokurikudō before 1191, but their service was temporarily halted. However, shortly after this, a member of the Hiki clan, Ōta Tomosue, is seen succeeding as Governor of Etchū Province.

Yoshikazu's daughter Wakasa no Tsubone became the wife of the 2nd shogun Minamoto no Yoriie. In 1184, Wakasa no Tsubone gave birth to Yoriie's first son, Minamoto no Ichiman. Following this, the Hiki clan rose to true power, and wielded considerable political power through their relation to the ruling Minamoto clan.

However, the Hiki clan's growing power was faced with opposition, and the clan ultimately came into conflict with the Hōjō clan. When Yoriie fell ill in 1203, a battle of succession began between Yoriie's younger brother Minamoto no Sanetomo, and Yoriie's son Ichiman, who should have been the legitimate successor to the shogunate. Caused by the conflict, Yoshikazu planned the punitive expedition of the Hōjō clan and to have Ichiman succeed as the next shogun. However, before the Hiki clan could act out on the plan, Hōjō Tokimasa invited Yoshikazu over for peace talks, but had him assassinated and his house burned to the ground in 1203. After this, Yoshikazu's son Hiki Munekazu and Ichiman were also killed, and the Hiki clan was completely destroyed. After hearing about this, Yoriie ordered the assassination of Tokimasa to Wada Yoshimori and Nitta Tadatsune. However, Yoriie was forced to become a Buddhist monk and was confined at Shuzen-ji temple, and many of Yoriie's close associates were either imprisoned or exiled.

Following this incident known as the Hiki Rebellion, the Hōjō clan is seen taking over the post of Governor of Etchū Province. As a result of this succession, Hōjō Tomotoki became Hokurikudō Dai-shogun during the Jōkyū War in 1221, and his descendants, the Nagoe lineage of the Hōjō clan, served as Governor of Etchū Province for generations through the Kamakura period.

Hiki Yoshimoto was the sole survivor of the purge of the Hiki clan. He fled to Kyoto where he met Nichiren and became his disciple. Yoshimoto returned to Kamakura when he was much older. Upon his return, Yoshimoto built Myōhon-ji temple on his residential land in Kamakura to console the souls of his ancestors.

== Notable clan members ==
- Hiki Yoshikazu
- Hiki no Ama
- Wakasa no Tsubone, wife of Minamoto no Yoriie

== See also ==
- Hōjō Masako
- Minamoto no Yoritomo
- Kamakura shogunate
