= Myōhon-ji =

Buddhist temple in Kamakura, Kanagawa, Japan

Coordinates: 35°19′3.3″N 139°33′20.9″E

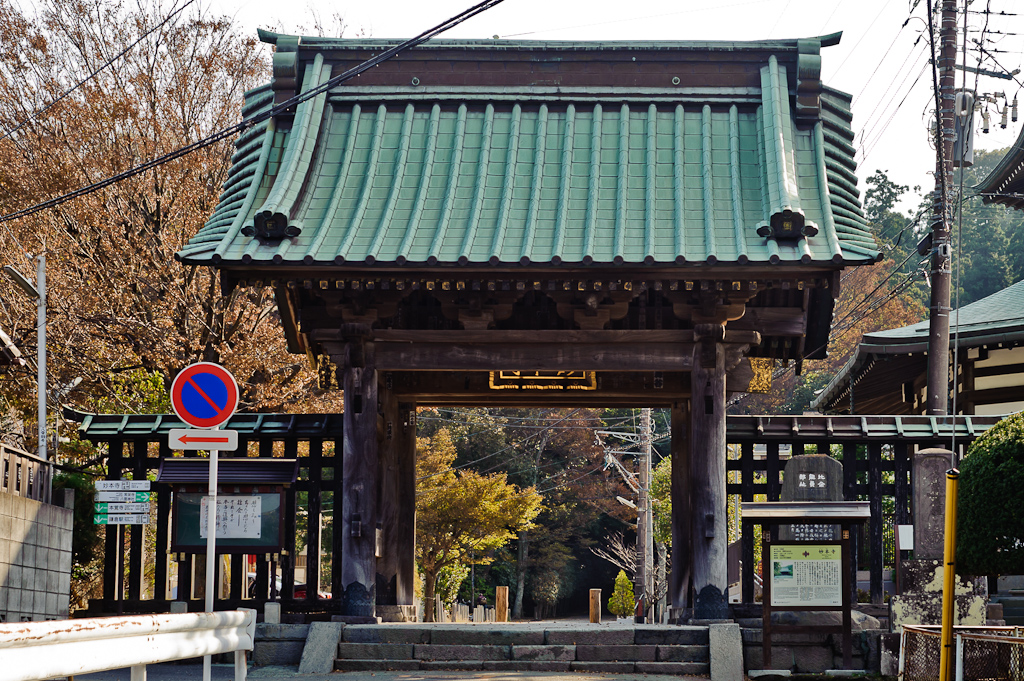
Myōhon-ji's gate

Myōhon-ji (妙本寺) is one of the oldest Nichiren sect temples in Kamakura, Kanagawa. Its official name is Chōkō-zan Myōhon-ji (長興山妙本寺). "Chōkō" comes from the posthumous name of Nichiren's father and "Myōhon" from his mother's.

== History ==
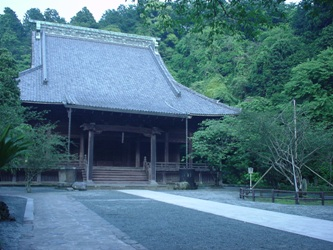
Soshidō of the Myōhon-ji

In 1202 Minamoto no Yoriie became shōgun at the age of 18. Real power remained with his grandfather, Hōjō Tokimasa and his mother Masako. Yoriie married Wakasa no Tsubone, the daughter of Hiki Yoshikazu a general and warrior upon whom he relied heavily. Soon after, Wakasa gave birth to a boy named Ichiman, who should have been the legitimate successor to the shogunate. Tokimasa invited over Hiki Yoshikazu for peace talks and then had him assassinated and his house burned to the ground in 1203.

Hiki Yoshimoto was the sole survivor of this tragedy. He fled to Kyoto where he met Nichiren and became his disciple. Yoshimoto returned to Kamakura when he was much older. Upon his return Hiki Yoshimoto built Myohon-ji on his residential land in Kamakura to console the souls of his ancestors.

Tombs of all of the Hiki family members and their relatives are on the right hand side of the garden. Previously, the tombs were housed in Ankokuron-ji, but in the 1920s they were moved to Myōhon-ji.

== Soshido ==
The Soshido, or "founding priest's hall", is the largest and most prominent structure on the grounds. A wooden statue of Nichiren was constructed in the 14th century by Priest Nippo (1259–1341) and is the main object of worship contained inside the hall.

== Niten-mon ==
The Niten-mon, or "Two Heaven's Gate", was built in 1840. It is a bright red gate located right before Soshido Hall. A pair of statues, Tamonten and Jikokuten, is contained within.

== Related structures ==
=== Jakushi-dō ===
The full name of Jakushi-dō is Jakushi Myōjin, which translates to "God For Serpent Sufferer's Relief".

When the Shogun's wife, Wakasa heard Ichiman was killed, she threw herself into a nearby well. Wakasa's spirit was said to have transformed into a serpent. One day it possessed the body the daughter of Hojo Masamura (the seventh Hojo Regent) who became seriously ill. She spoke deliriously and crawled like a snake. Masamura built the hall of worship Jakushi-do in order to appease the spirit.

=== Well ===
The well nearby Jakushi Myōjin is called Jagyo no I ("Snake-Shape Well").

=== Statue ===
A large bronze statue, built in 2002, of Nichiren can be found on the temple grounds just before the Soshidō (Founder's Hall).
