= Hōjō Maki =

Hōjō Maki may refer to:

- Hōjō Maki (北条 牧, 牧の方), also Hōjō no Maki, wife of Hōjō Tokimasa, the first Shikken of Japan, and mother of Hōjō Masako the wife of Shōgun Minamoto no Yoritomo.
