= Kugyō (priest) =

Son of Minamoto no Yoriie (1200–1219)

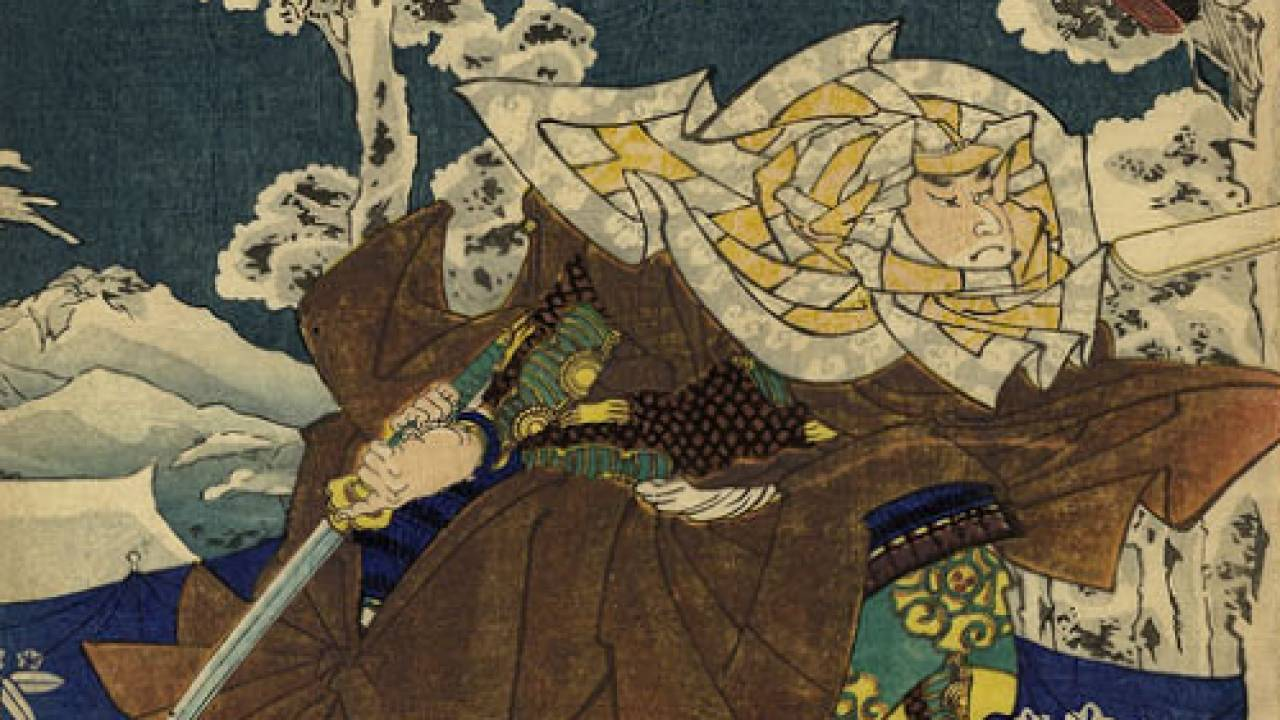
Minamoto no Yoshinari (源 頼暁, 1200 – 1219), second son of 2nd Kamakura shōgun Minamoto no Yoriie, also known as Kugyō (公暁)

Kugyō (公暁; 1200–February 13, 1219), also known as Minamoto no Zensai (源善哉) or Saemon Hokkyō Yoriaki (左衛門法橋頼暁), was the second son of the second Kamakura shōgun of Japan, Minamoto no Yoriie. At the age of six, after his father was killed in Shuzenji in Izu, he became his uncle Sanetomo's adopted son and, thanks to his grandmother Hōjō Masako's intercession, a disciple of Songyō, Tsurugaoka Hachiman-gū's bettō (head priest). After his tonsure he was given the Buddhist name "Kugyō" replacing his childhood name Yoshinari. He then went to Kyōto to take his vows, coming back at age 18 to become Tsurugaoka Hachiman-gū's new bettō, the shrine's fourth. In 1219 he murdered his uncle Sanetomo on the stone stairs at Tsurugaoka Hachiman-gū in the shogunal capital of Kamakura, an act for which he was himself slain on the same day.

== Shōgun Sanetomo's assassination ==
=== Assassination ===
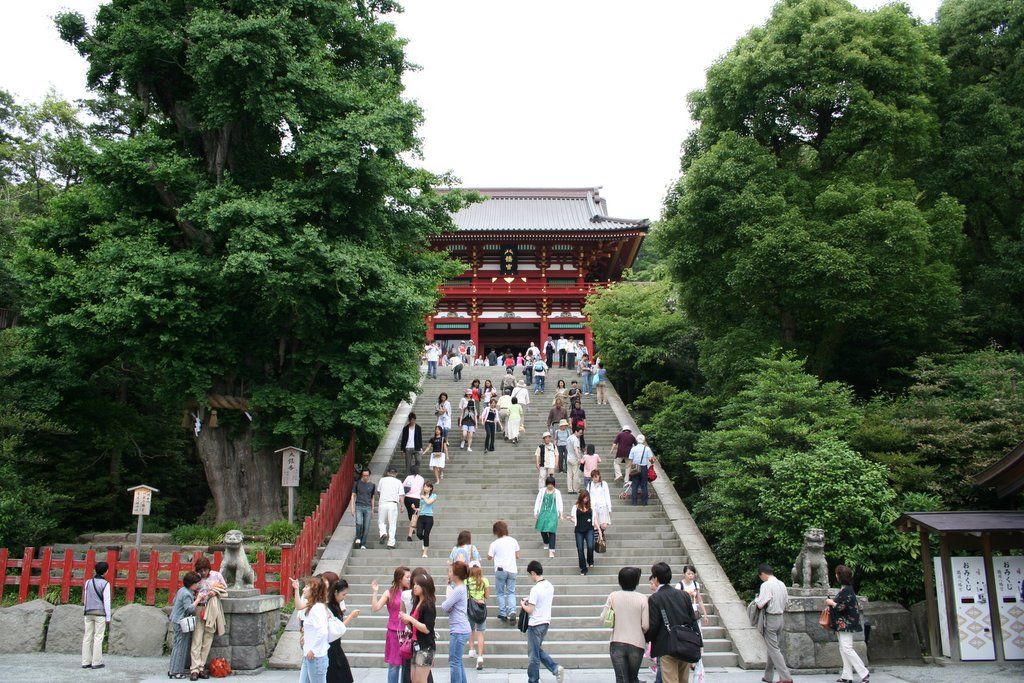
The scene of the murder. Visible the shrine, the stairs and the giant ginkgo

The assassination is chronicled in the Azuma Kagami and in the Gukanshō. What follows is the Azuma Kagami's version of events.

At about six in the evening of February 12, 1219 (Jōkyū-1, 26th day of the 1st month), the Buddhist New Year, Sanetomo had just finished the Ceremony of Celebration for his nomination to Udaijin. It had been snowing the whole day and there was more than 60 cm of snow on the ground. The shōgun left the temple's gate and started descending the stone stairs accompanied only by the sword-bearer, a man called Nakaakira. Hōjō Yoshitoki, son of former Regent Hōjō Tokimasa and regent himself since 1205, should have been the sword-bearer, but had gone back to his mansion in Komachi early because he was not feeling well. Unexpectedly Kugyō came up from near the stone stairs, yelled: "This is for killing my father!" (父の敵を討つ), and struck him with a sword, cutting off his head. The assassin then killed Nakaakira, and according to the Gukanshō, he did this thinking he was Hōjō Yoshitoki, as he should have been.

Sources do not always agree. Kugyō is for example described as wearing either woman's clothes (in the Azuma Kagami) or his monastic uniform. It is often said that he was hiding behind the great ginkgo tree, but the Azuma Kagami simply says he came "from the side of the stone stairs" (石段の際). The detail of the ginkgo first appears in the Shinpen Kamakurashi, and is therefore considered an Edo period invention.

=== Kugyō's death ===
Having killed his uncle, Kugyō took his head, left the temple and went to hide temporarily at the home of its guardian in Yukinoshita. From there he sent a messenger to Miura Yoshimura's home in Nishi Mikado, explaining that he was now the new shōgun and wanted to talk to him as soon as possible about what was to be done. Yoshimura and his family had an extremely close relationship with Kugyō, whose wetnurse had been a Miura. To buy time, Yoshimura sent back a message in which he asked Kugyō to stay where he was because he would send some soldiers to pick him up. While Kugyō waited, Yoshimura sent a messenger to Yoshitoki's residence in Komachi. Yoshitoki immediately sent back the order to execute the assassin. Yoshimura gathered the family council to decide how to do that. Nagao Sadakage, a samurai known for his strength and reliability, was then entrusted with the task. He left with a group of five men, and on the way they met Kugyō himself who, unable to contain himself and wait for Yoshimura's escort, had left his refuge and was already in Nishi Mikado on his way to Yoshimura's mansion. While one of the five men engaged him, Nagao Sadakage beheaded him. His head was then brought to the Regent's residence in Komachi for identification.

== Debate about Kugyō's motives ==
According to the traditional interpretation of events, Kugyō's act had been instigated by Yoshitoki and the Hōjō, who wanted to get rid at one stroke of the last two male members of the Seiwa Genji line. Historians however now see the theory as unsupported by evidence and probably untrue. Although the assassination undoubtedly served Yoshitoki's interests, it is unclear why Kugyō would have willingly helped the Hōjō family, who was responsible not only for his father's death, but also for that of his brother Ichiman and of the entire Hiki clan. The death of Nakaakira the sword-bearer makes it likely that Kugyō meant to kill Yoshitoki too. His relationship with Yoshimura was extremely close (Yoshimura's wife had been Kugyō's wet nurse), and it seems more plausible that the two had planned together the assassination of both Sanetomo and Yoshitoki. Sanetomo's wet nurse had been Masako's younger sister, making the shōgun emotionally close to the Hōjō, and this failed coup d'état was probably just an episode in the ongoing war between Hōjō and Miura, which continued until the Miura's defeat in 1247. Realizing that Yoshitoki had avoided death out of sheer luck and that their plan was doomed, Yoshimura could very well have decided that he had to betray Kugyō to save himself and his family.

== General references ==
- Yasuda, Motohisa, ed. (1990). Kamakura, Muromachi Jinmei Jiten (in Japanese). Tokyo: Shin Jinbutsu Ōraisha. ISBN 978-4-404-01757-4. OCLC 24654085.
- Jeffrey, Mass (1995). Court and Bakufu in Japan: Essays in Kamakura. Stanford University Press. ISBN 978-0-8047-2473-9.
- Kamakura Shōkō Kaigijo (2008). Kamakura Kankō Bunka Kentei Kōshiki Tekisutobukku (in Japanese). Kamakura: Kamakura Shunshūsha. ISBN 978-4-7740-0386-3.
- Kusumoto, Katsuji (July 2002). Kamakura Naruhodo Jiten (in Japanese). Tokyo: Jitsugyō no Nihonsha. ISBN 978-4-408-00779-3.
- Mutsu, Iso. (2006). Kamakura: Fact and Legend. Tokyo: Tuttle Publishing. ISBN 0-8048-1968-8
- Kamiya, Michinori (2008). Fukaku Aruku - Kamakura Shiseki Sansaku Vol. 1 & 2 (in Japanese). Kamakura: Kamakura Shunshūsha. ISBN 978-4-7740-0340-5.
- Azuma Kagami, accessed on September 4, 2008; National Archives of Japan 特103-0001, digitized image of the Azumakagami (in Japanese)
