= Jufuku-ji =

Buddhist temple in Kamakura, Kanagawa, Japan

Jufuku-ji 寿福寺
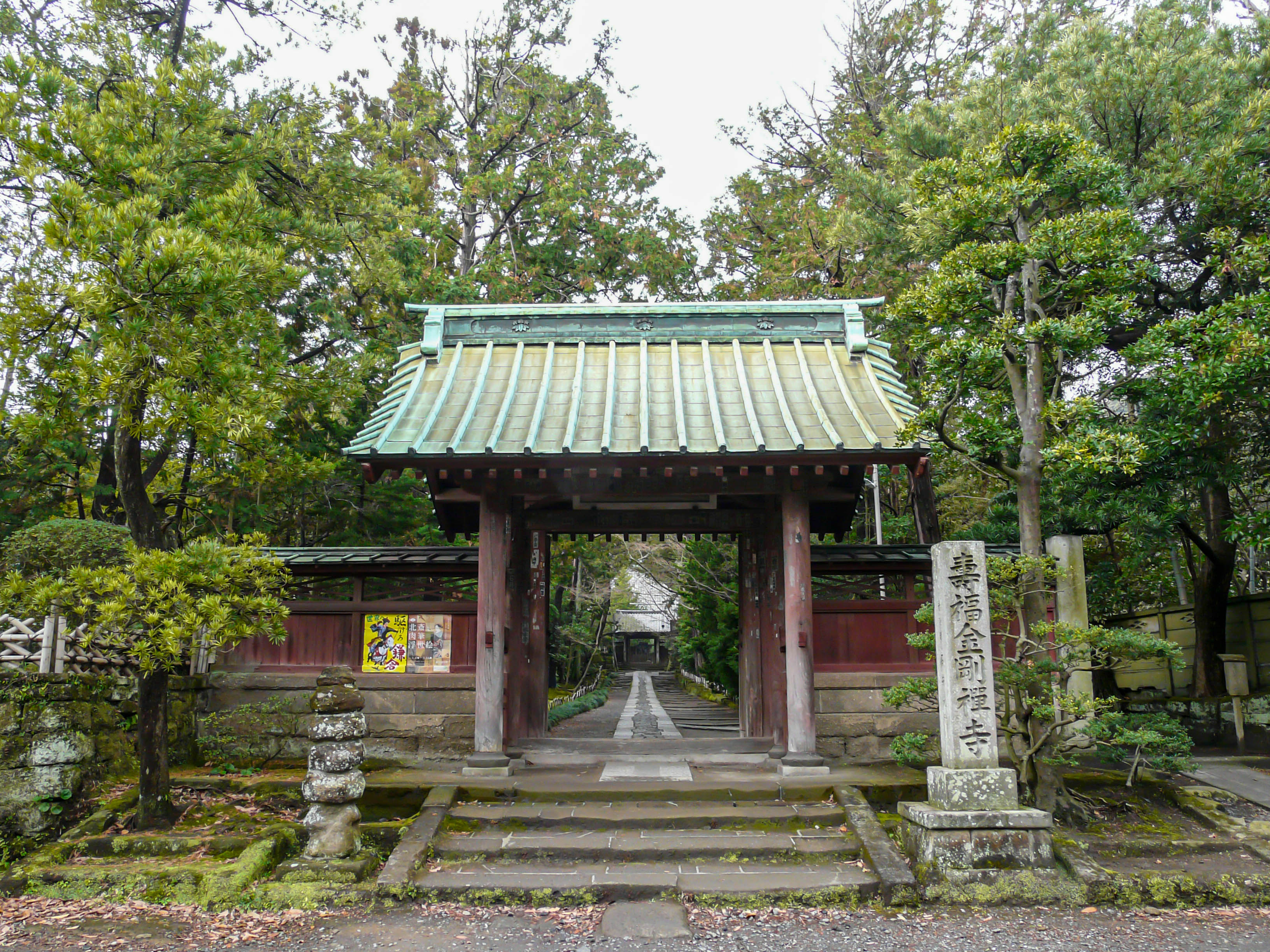
- Sōmon

Religion
- Affiliation: Kenchō-ji Rinzai
- Deity: Shaka Nyorai (Śākyamuni)
- Status: Five Mountain Temple (Kamakura)

Location
- Location: 1-Chōme-17-7 Ōgigayatsu, Kamakura, Kanagawa Prefecture
- Country: Japan
- Interactive map of Jufuku-ji 寿福寺
- Coordinates: 35°19′27″N 139°32′57″E

Architecture
- Founder: Hōjō Masako, Eisai
- Established: 1200
- Completed: 18th century (Reconstruction)

Website
- None

Kikokuzan Kongō Jufuku Zenji (亀谷山金剛寿福禅寺), usually known as Jufuku-ji, is a temple of the Kenchō-ji branch of the Rinzai sect and the oldest Zen temple in Kamakura, Kanagawa Prefecture, Japan. Ranked third among Kamakura's prestigious Five Mountains, it is number 24 among the Thirty-Three Kamakura Kannon (鎌倉三十三観音, Kamakura Sanjūsan Kannon) pilgrimage temples and number 18 of the Kamakura Nijūyon Jizō (鎌倉二十四地蔵) temples. Its main object of worship is Shaka Nyorai.

== History ==
The temple was founded by Hōjō Masako (1157–1225), a great historical figure familiar enough to the Japanese to appear on television jidaigeki dramas, in order to enshrine her husband Minamoto no Yoritomo (1147–1199), founder of the Kamakura shogunate, who died falling from his horse in 1199. Having chosen Jufuku-ji's present site because it used to be Yoritomo's father's residence, she invited Buddhist priest Myōan Eisai to be its founding priest. Eisai is important in the history of Zen because it was he who, after being ordained in China, introduced it to Japan. He is also known for introducing green tea to the country. Ostracized by the Tendai school in Kyoto because of the new ideas he had introduced there after coming back from China, Eisai agreed to come to Kamakura, where he was to stay and have great religious influence. Among the famous Zen masters that were active at Jufuku-ji are Enni Bennen (円爾弁円) (1202–1280), who was invited to come here in 1257 by Hōjō Tokiyori, and the Chinese Rankei Dōryū (chin. 蘭溪道隆, Lánxī Dàolóng, W.-G. Lan-hsi Tao-long; 1213–1278).

Although very small now, in its heyday the temple used to have as many as 14 subtemples. Its Main Hall, which constitutes the bulk of its compound now, is closed to the public and can be seen only from the inner gate. Over the centuries, the Main Hall burned down many times so that, in spite of the temple's great age, the present one dates only to the period between 1751 and 1763. Inside it are three statues of Shakyamuni which are the main object of worship. There are also a statue of Eleven-Headed Kannon and two enormous wooden Deva Kings or Niō, brought here from Tsurugaoka Hachiman-gū at the time of the mandatory separation of Shinto and Buddhism (shinbutsu bunri), in 1872.

== Graveyard ==
In the temple's vast graveyard behind the main hall, inside caves called yagura, are buried all the chief priests of the temple. Two yagura are dedicated to Hōjō Masako and her son Minamoto no Sanetomo, who was assassinated while still young by nephew Kugyō on the stairs of Tsurugaoka Hachiman-gū. Masako and Sanetomo's ashes are not actually there, though, because they were put in a temple, Chōshōjū-in, which no longer exists, and are therefore lost.

Among the other graves can be found not only those of Japanese celebrities including haiku poet Takahama Kiyoshi and novelist Osaragi Jirō, but also those of some foreigners, among them Countess Iso Mutsu (1867–1930).

== See also ==
- Thirteen Buddhist Sites of Kamakura
