= Minamoto no Yoriie =

Japanese Samurai, Daimyo and Military ruler of Japan from 1202 to 1203

Minamoto no Yoriie 源頼家
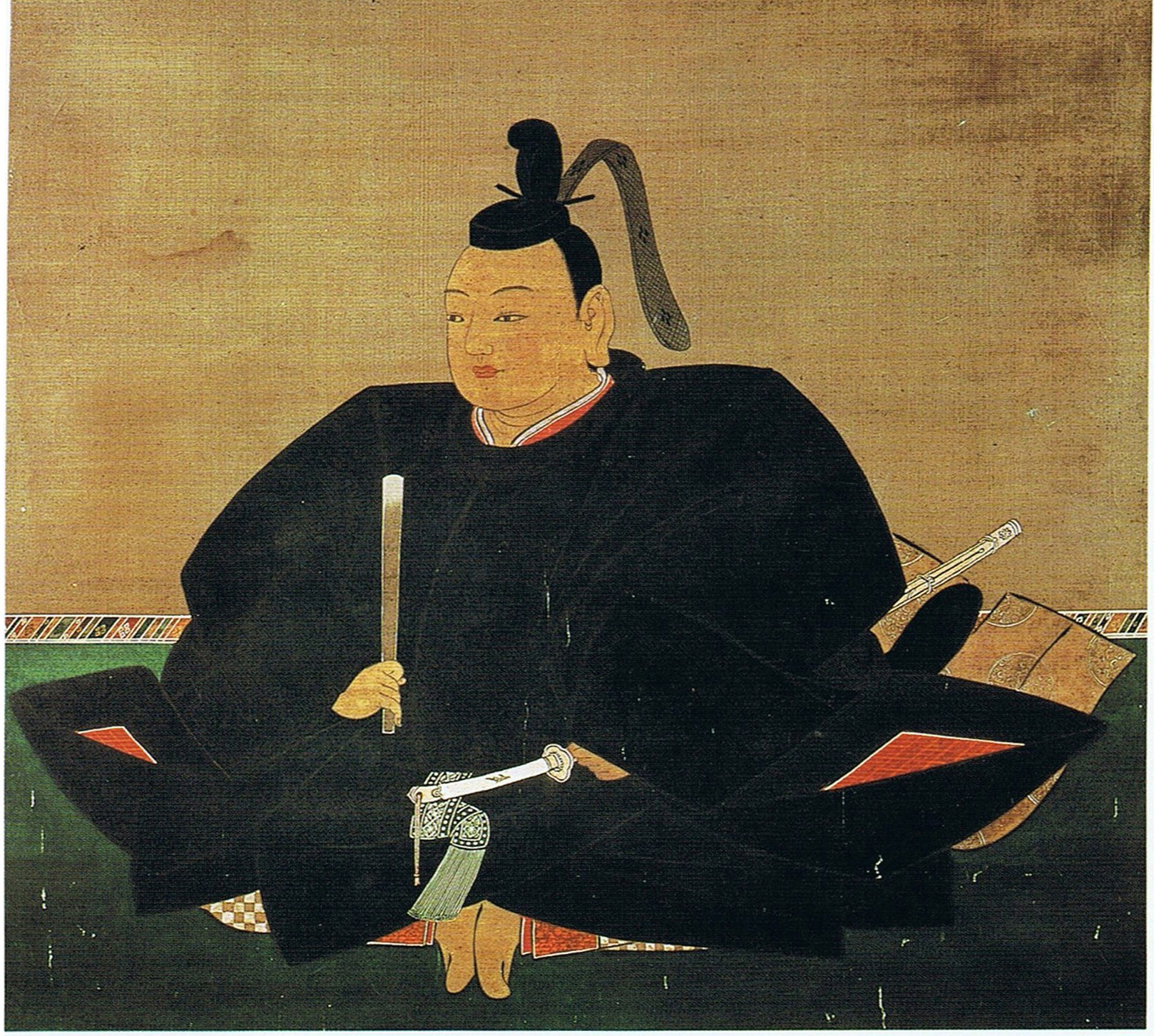

Shōgun
- In office 1202–1203
- Monarch: Tsuchimikado
- Preceded by: Minamoto no Yoritomo
- Succeeded by: Minamoto no Sanetomo

Personal details
- Born: September 11, 1182 Kamakura, Kanagawa, Japan
- Died: August 14, 1204 (aged 21)
- Spouse: Wakasa no Tsubone
- Children: Minamoto no Ichiman; Kugyō (Minamoto no Yoshinari); Eijitsu; Zengyō; Take no Gosho
- Parents: Minamoto no Yoritomo (father); Hōjō Masako (mother)

Minamoto no Yoriie (Japanese: 源 頼家; September 11, 1182 – August 14, 1204) was a Japanese samurai, daimyo and the second shōgun (1202–1203) of the Kamakura shogunate and the first son of its founder, Minamoto no Yoritomo. His Dharma name was Hokke-in-dono Kingo Da’i Zengo (法華院殿金吾大禅閤).

== Life ==
Yoriie was born in Kamakura at the residence of Hiki Yoshikazu. Before his birth, Yoritomo ordered construction of the Dankazura on Wakamiya Ōji at Tsurugaoka Hachimangū to pray for a safe delivery. His childhood name was Manju (万寿). He later fathered an heir, Ichiman, with Hiki’s daughter Wakasa no Tsubone; their son was also born at the Hiki mansion, on a site now occupied by Myōhon-ji.

After Yoritomo’s death in 1199, the seventeen-year-old Yoriie succeeded as head of the Minamoto clan and was appointed sei-i taishōgun in 1202.

=== Council of Thirteen and disputes among retainers ===
In 1199, leading gokenin established a Council of Thirteen to manage petitions and limit unilateral decisions by the young shōgun. Subsequent rivalries among senior retainers included the expulsion and death of Kajiwara Kagetoki and his clan in 1200, and suppression of allied disturbances in 1201; in this period Yoriie received the warrior Itagaki Gozen in audience. On July 22, 1202, he was formally invested as sei-i taishōgun.

=== Hiki–Hōjō struggle and deposition ===
Tensions between Yoriie’s in-laws, the Hiki clan, and his maternal relatives, the Hōjō clan, intensified after he fell seriously ill in 1203. A plan was discussed to divide authority between his son Ichiman and his younger brother Sanetomo. On September 2, 1203, Hōjō Tokimasa had Hiki Yoshikazu killed and destroyed the Hiki residence, where Ichiman died (events later known as the Hiki Incident). Yoriie was stripped of power on September 7, 1203, compelled to take Buddhist vows, and placed under confinement.

=== Death ===
Exiled to Shuzenji in Izu Province, Yoriie was assassinated in July 1204 by agents of the Hōjō leadership while under house arrest. Accounts differ on the method of killing in contemporary and later sources.

== Family and issue ==
Yoriie was the eldest son of Minamoto no Yoritomo and Hōjō Masako.

He was married to or maintained consort relationships with:

- Wakasa no Tsubone, daughter of Ichibō Shōkan, mother of his heir Ichiman.
- Tsuji-dono, daughter of Minamoto no Yoshinaka.

His known children include:

- Minamoto no Ichiman (1198–1203), killed during the Hiki Incident.
- Kugyō (Minamoto no Yoshinari), who assassinated his uncle Sanetomo in 1219.
- Eijitsu
- Zengyō
- Take no Gosho (Takegosho), later consort of the fourth shōgun Fujiwara no Yoritsune; died in 1234.

== Policies and administration ==
Sources describe Yoriie’s tenure as marked by jurisdictional disputes among gokenin, efforts to regularize capital guard duties, and attempts to delimit the authority of provincial shugo, broadly continuing late-Yoritomo policies amid increased litigation after the succession. In 1200 he personally adjudicated a boundary dispute in Mutsu Province, which became a noted example of direct shogunal judgment, alongside fact-finding missions in similar cases.

== Historiography ==
The Hōjō-compiled Azuma Kagami presents a negative portrait of Yoriie, while Kyoto-side sources such as Gukanshō and Meigetsuki record differing details and chronology; modern scholarship highlights these discrepancies when assessing the Hōjō seizure of power.

== Era name ==
His tenure as shōgun fell entirely within the Kennin era (1201–1204).

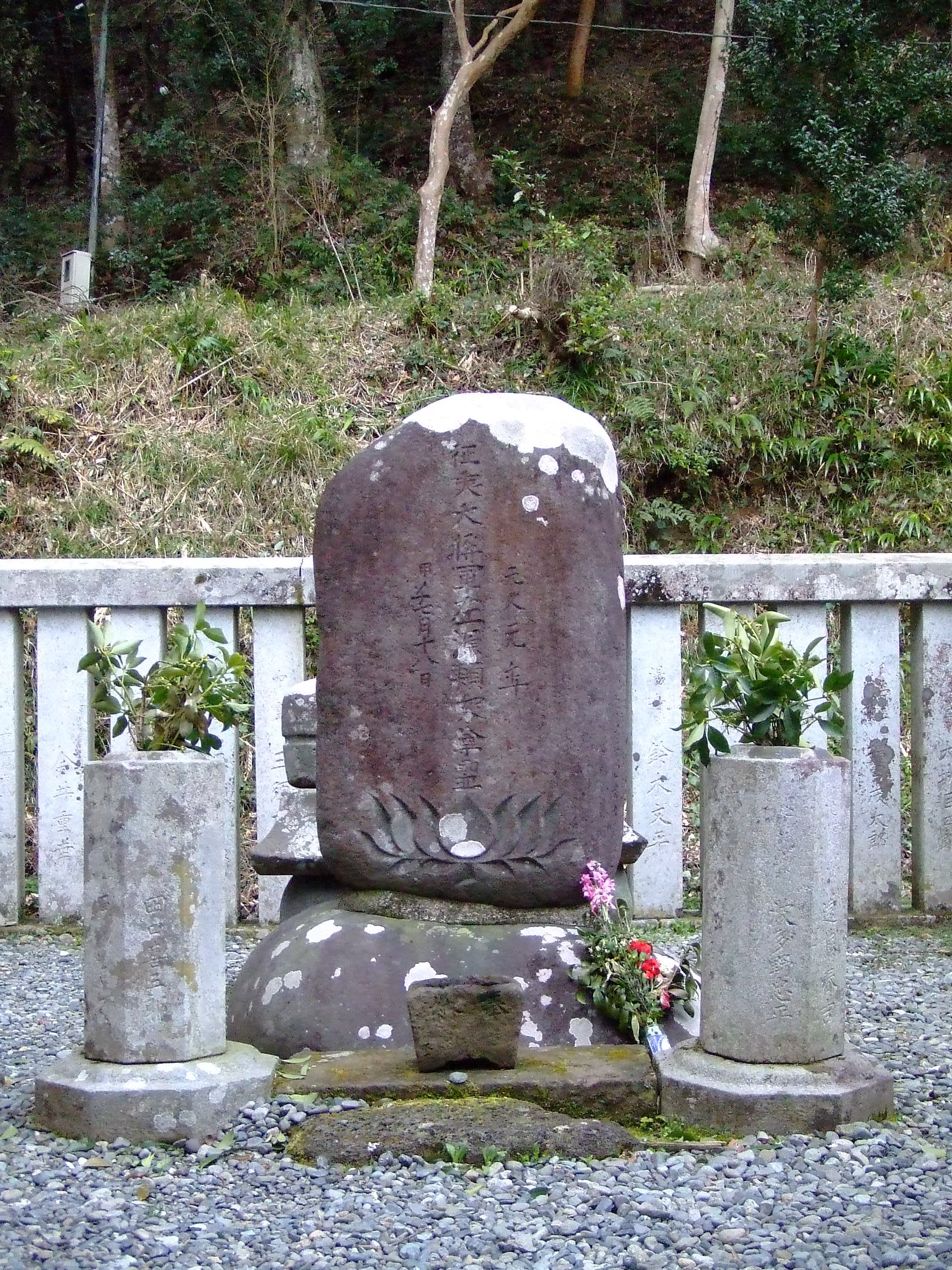
Minamoto no Yoriie’s grave in Shuzenji, Izu

== Notes ==
Preceded by Minamoto no Yoritomo	Shōgun; 1202–1203	Succeeded by Minamoto no Sanetomo
