= Hōjō Masako =

Japanese female samurai and politician

- 北条 政子
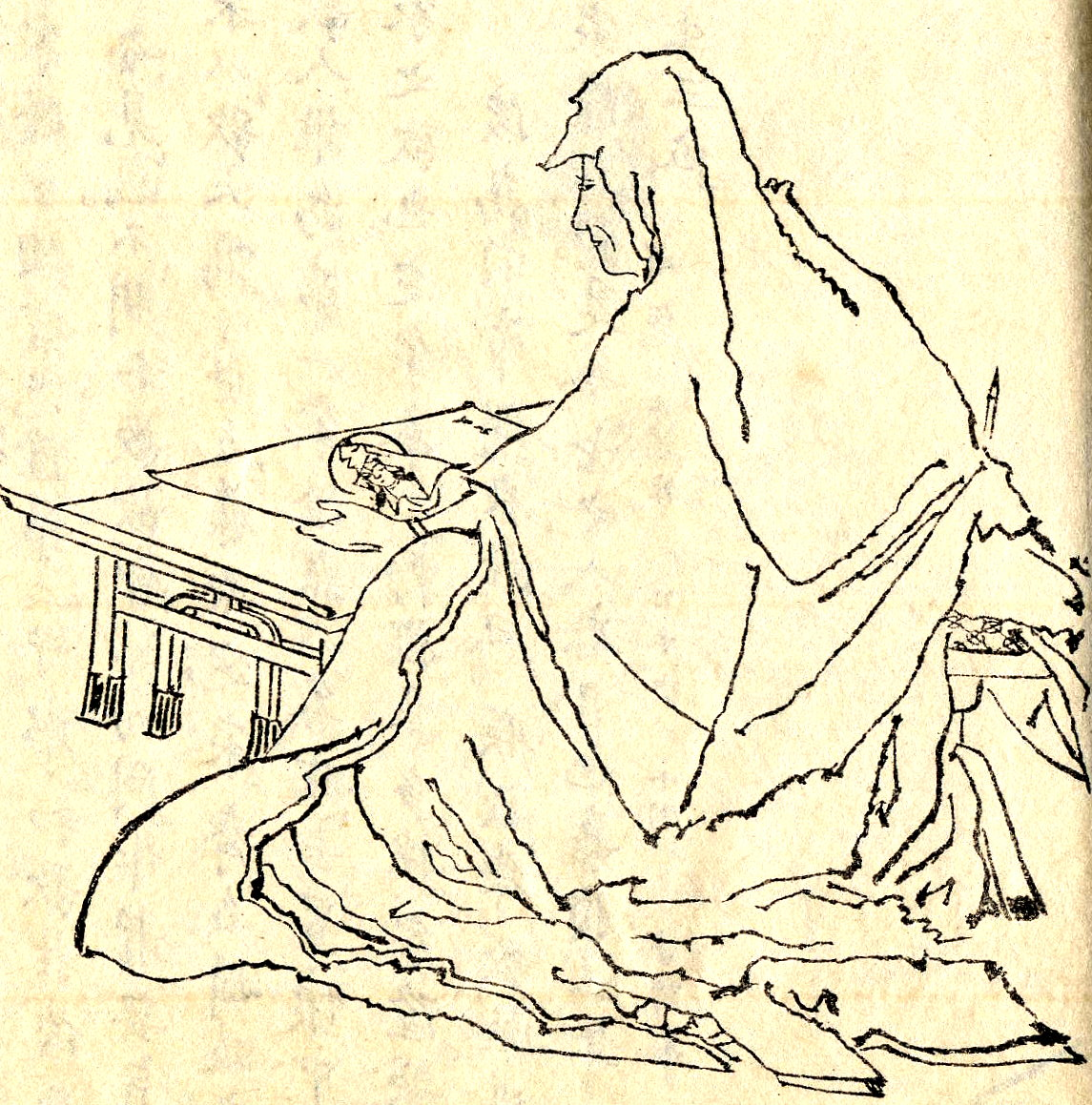
- Portrait by Kikuchi Yōsai

Midaidokoro

Personal details
- Born: 1157
- Died: 16 August 1225 (aged 68)
- Spouse: Minamoto no Yoritomo
- Relations: Awa no tsubone (sister); Hōjō Yoshitoki (brother); Hōjō Tokifusa (brother); Hōjō Tokiko (sister); Hōjō Munetoki (brother); Hōjō Masanori (brother); Kujō Yoritsune (grandson-in-law); Minamoto no Yoshitsune (brother-in-law); Minamoto no Noriyori (brother-in-law)
- Children: Minamoto no Yoriie; Minamoto no Sanetomo; Ōhime; Saneman
- Parent: Hōjō Tokimasa
- Occupation: Buddhist nun, politician

Hōjō Masako (北条 政子; 1157 – August 16, 1225) was a Japanese female samurai (onna-musha) and politician who exercised significant power in the early years of the Kamakura period, which was reflected by her contemporary sobriquet of the "nun shogun". She was the wife of Minamoto no Yoritomo, and mother of Minamoto no Yoriie and Minamoto no Sanetomo, the first, second and third shoguns of the Kamakura shogunate, respectively. She was the eldest daughter of Hōjō Tokimasa and sister of Hōjō Yoshitoki, both of them shikken of the Kamakura shogunate.

== Early life (1157–1177) ==
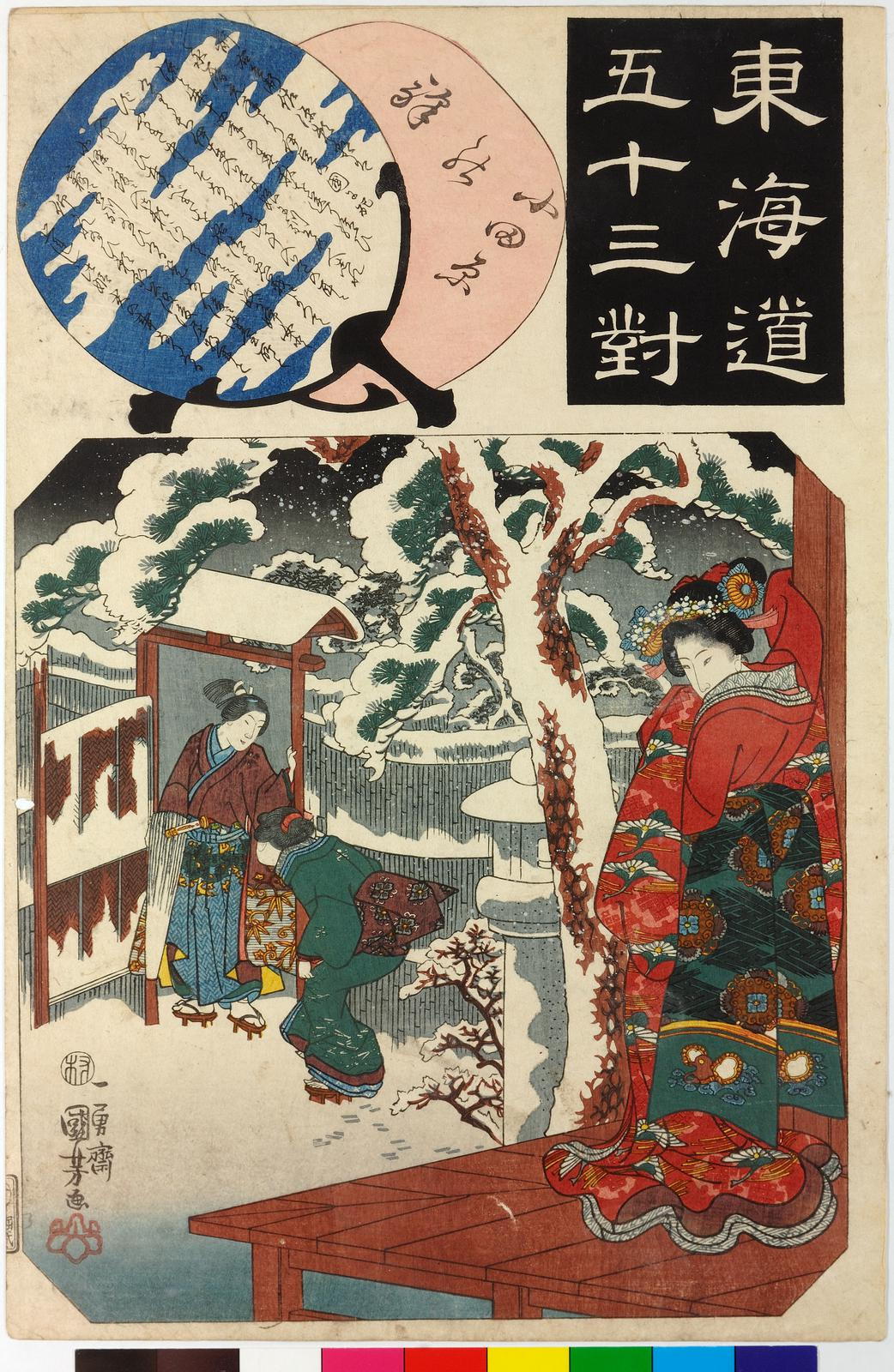
Minamoto no Yoritomo being admitted to the house of Masako, daughter of Hojo Tokimasa (right).

Hōjō Masako was born in 1157, eldest child of Hōjō Tokimasa, leader of the Hōjō clan of the Izu province, and his first wife, whose personal name is unknown. Like her mother, Masako's real name is unknown, but she received the formal name Masako after being granted Junior Third Rank in 1218. It was uncommon for women in medieval Japan to use their personal names in public documents.

It was not common for parents to raise their children in medieval Japan, so she was raised by many ladies-in-waiting and their larger families, which is a concept known as menoto. Masako was born into the eastern warrior society, which could have played a role in shaping her alleged strong-willed and no-nonsense personality. The Hōjō clan was relatively low in significance in the Izu province, with little land ownership and a very small number of warriors. They claimed to be of Taira descent (a very popular claim at the time), but it was insignificant in relation to their influence due to a lack of well-documented proof.

In Kyoto, the capital of Japan, the Hōgen Rebellion was in full swing. Cloistered Emperor Toba and Emperor Sutoku warred over who would be the next emperor. The Hōjō clan wisely chose to stay out of the rebellion, even though they claimed loyalty to the Taira. During the Heiji Rebellion in 1159, the Taira clan, under Taira no Kiyomori, defeated the Minamoto clan with the support of Cloistered Emperor Go-Shirakawa. Minamoto no Yoshitomo, leader of the Minamoto clan, was executed, while his sons and daughters were either executed or sent to nunneries. Of his surviving sons, Minamoto no Yoshitsune and Minamoto no Noriyori were forced into the priesthood, while Minamoto no Yoritomo, at the age of thirteen, was exiled to Izu in the domain of Hōjō Tokimasa. While this was happening, Masako was barely an infant. The Taira under Kiyomori were from this point on in effective control of Japan.

Masako was the oldest child of fifteen. After her birth mother's passing, she took up a lot of household duties, such as caring for her younger siblings. She was instructed in horseback riding, hunting, fishing, and she ate with men rather than with the women of the household. Her brother, Hōjō Yoshitoki, born in 1163, would eventually become the second Hōjō shikken (regent) of the Kamakura shogunate and head of the Hōjō clan. Another of her brothers, Hōjō Tokifusa, would become a member of the Rokuhara Tandai.

== Yoritomo and Marriage (1177-1182) ==
Masako married Yoritomo around 1177, against her father's wishes. They had become romantically involved while Tokimasa was in Kyoto serving a 3-year guard position. When her father found out, he tried to arrange for her to marry someone else (Yamaki Kanetaka), but she refused, even going as far to run away with Yoritomo until Tokimasa agreed to let them get married. Masako's father was reasonably hesitant, both because allowing them to marry could raise tension with the Imperial court due to the Minamoto family being their enemy, but also being Yoritomo already fathered a child to another powerful family (Ito clan).

In 1179, they had their first daughter, Ō-Hime. As Yoritomo's wife, she participated in government administration and eventually became a representation of power for the Hōjō clan.

The same year a disillusioned Imperial Prince Mochihito, son of Emperor Go-Shirakawa, called on members of the Minamoto still remaining in Japan to overthrow the Taira. Mochihito thought the Taira had denied him the throne to offer it to Emperor Antoku, who was half Taira. Minamoto no Yoritomo considered himself the head of the Minamoto and responded. He had the full support of the Hōjō and Hōjō Tokimasa, not to mention Masako. The Minamoto center of power was the city of Kamakura, to the east of Izu in Sagami Province. The Genpei War, the final war between Minamoto and Taira had begun.

In 1180, Masako's elder brother Munetoki was killed at Battle of Ishibashiyama and Yoshitoki became heir of Hōjō clan. In 1181, Taira no Kiyomori died, leaving the Taira in the hands of his son Taira no Munemori. In 1182, Masako and Yoritomo had their first son, Minamoto no Yoriie.

== The Genpei War and its aftermath (1182–1199) ==
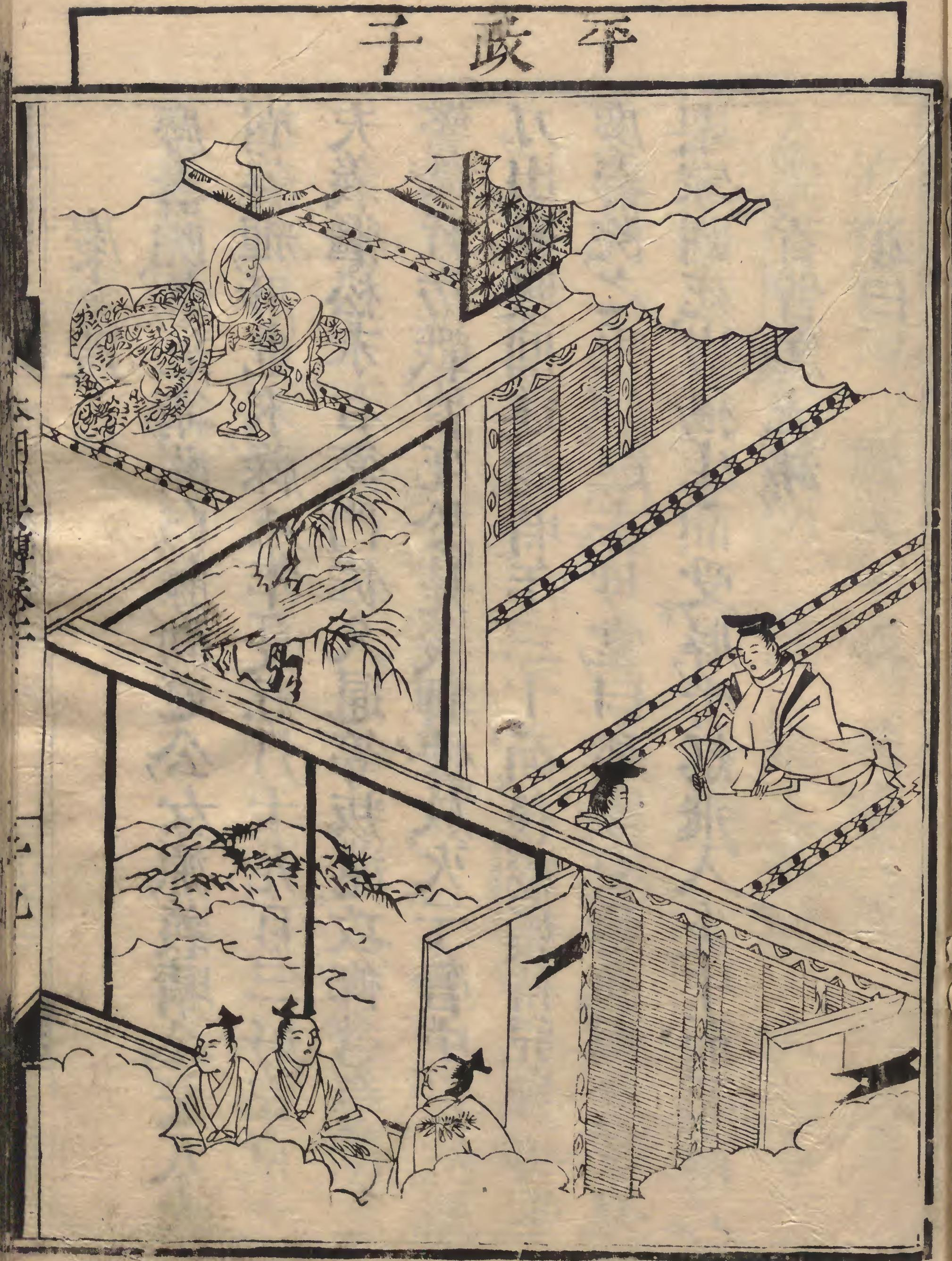
Hōjō Masako

In 1183, Yoritomo's rival and cousin Minamoto no Yoshinaka took Kyoto, forcing the Taira (and Emperor Antoku) to Shikoku. Soon after, Emperor Go-Toba was installed by the Minamoto. Minamoto no Yoshitsune and Minamoto no Noriyori, Yoritomo's half brothers who had joined the conflict on his side, drove Yoshinaka out of the capital and executed him, taking Kyoto in the name of Yoritomo (and the Hōjō).

By 1185, the Taira were defeated at the climactic Battle of Dan-no-ura, which ended the war. Munemori was executed, while the remaining Taira were either executed or drowned as they fled, including the young Emperor Antoku. Yoritomo was now the undisputed leader of Japan and his wife Hōjō Masako and her family had stood by her husband through it all.

Yoritomo's allegiance to his wife's family and her dislike of her brothers-in-law, as well as an internal power struggle brought on by the three brothers, eventually resulted in the arrest and execution of Yoshitsune and Noriyori. Yoritomo bestowed the titles of shugo and jitō on loyal followers to undermine Emperor Go-Shirakawa's authority and the central government's control in the provinces while Kyoto was relegated to a ceremonial role and power shifted to center around Kamakura.

In 1192, after the death of Go-Shirakawa, Yoritomo proclaimed himself shōgun and took official control over Japan. He was now the undisputed ruler and most powerful man in country. That same year Masako and Yoritomo had another son, Minamoto no Sanetomo.

== Yoritomo's death and familial strife (1199–1205) ==
In 1199, Minamoto no Yoritomo died. He was succeeded as shōgun by his son, Minamoto no Yoriie. Since he was only eighteen, Hōjō Tokimasa proclaimed himself shikken or regent for Yoriie. Masako also had a strong position since her son was shōgun. Since her husband was dead, she shaved her head and became a Buddhist nun, receiving a tonsure from the priest Gyōyū. However, she did not take up residence in a monastery or a nunnery, and still involved herself in politics. Along with her father Tokimasa and her brother Yoshitoki, Masako created a council of regents for the eighteen-year-old Yoriie. The headstrong shōgun hated his mother's family and preferred his wife's family, the Hiki clan, and his father-in-law, Hiki Yoshikazu.

Hōjō Masako overheard a plot that Yoshikazu and Yoriie were hatching, and turned in her own son to Tokimasa, who did not hurt Yoriie but had Yoshikazu executed in 1203. Now, Shōgun Yoriie was very sick and retired to Izu Province. He was murdered in 1204, no doubt by Tokimasa's orders. Masako had not been aware of this. During the murders and purges of the Hiki clan, Minamoto no Ichiman, Yoriie's eldest son and heir and Masako's grandson, was also executed since he was part Hiki himself.

In 1203, Masako's other son by Yoritomo, Minamoto no Sanetomo, became the third shōgun with Tokimasa as regent. Sanetomo was closer to his mother than his elder brother was, and still a child when appointed shōgun, by contrast his brother, who was forced to abdicate as shōgun was now an adult. Nonetheless, Masako and Yoshitoki, the heir to the Hōjō, were angry with their father, especially after their mother, Hōjō no Maki, died in 1204. Masako's sister's husband, Hatakeyama Shigetada, was wrongfully executed on Tokimasa's orders even after Yoshitoki, Masako, and Tokifusa told Tokimasa he was not guilty of the "treason" charges. Hōjō Tokimasa was by 1205 the most powerful man in Kamakura.

Masako heard rumors that Tokimasa was planning to execute Sanetomo and replace him with one of his allies, so Masako and Yoshitoki immediately ordered Tokimasa to step down and go into priesthood or they would rebel. Hōjō Tokimasa abdicated in 1205, and was sent off to a monastery in Kamakura, where he shaved his head and became a monk, dying in 1215.

== The later years (1205–1225) ==
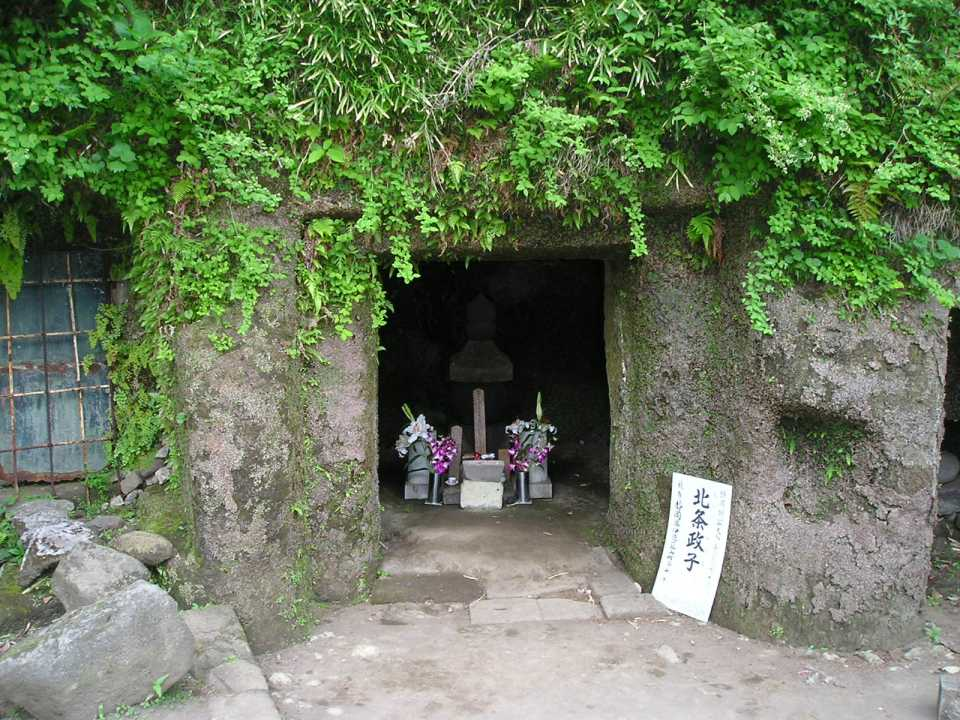
Hōjō Masako's tomb at the Jufuku-ji, Kamakura, Japan

Tokimasa was ousted in 1205 when Minamoto no Sanetomo became shōgun. The position of the Hōjō clan was still secure. Masako's brother, Hōjō Yoshitoki, succeeded as shikken for Sanetomo, and Masako herself remained in a powerful position as a negotiator with the court. In 1218, Masako was awarded the court rank of Junior Second Rank by the imperial government. She continued to work towards the creation of an advisory council. During this time, she was sent by Regent Yoshitoki on a mission to the Cloistered Emperor Go-Toba, to ask if Minamoto no Sanetomo might adopt one of the emperor's sons as an heir. The emperor refused.

In 1219, Sanetomo was killed by his nephew Kugyō, son of his murdered elder brother Yoriie. Sanetomo's death marked the end of the Minamoto line of shōguns. Masako and Hōjō Yoshitoki selected Kujō Yoritsune, known as Fujiwara no Yoritsune, as the next shōgun. Because Yoritsune was still an infant, Masako was able to act as de facto shōgun until her death. Yoritsune belonged to the Kujō clan (itself part of the Fujiwara clan) but his grandmother was the niece of first shōgun Yoritomo. This meant that whilst he was not strictly a member of the Hōjō clan he was still a figurehead for them.

During the Jōkyū War of 1221, Go-Toba rebelled against the Hōjō. Kamakura was greatly upset by that news, but Masako is said to have calmed it down with her celebrated speech to Kamakura vassals. Azuma Kagami, the official chronicle of the Kamakura shogunate, tells that Masako summoned the vassals and had these words delivered to them by Adachi Kagemori, the Vice-Governor of Akita Fortress:

“皆心を一にして奉るべし。これ最期の詞なり。故右大將軍朝敵を征罰し、關東を草創してより以降、官位と云ひ俸祿と云ひ、其の恩既に山嶽よりも高く、溟渤よりも深し。報謝の志これ淺からんや。而るに今逆臣の讒に依り非義の綸旨を下さる。名を惜しむの族は、早く秀康・胤義等を討取り三代將軍の遺蹟を全うすべし。但し院中に參らんと慾する者は、只今申し切るべし。

Listen carefully to my final words. Since the days when Yoritomo, the late Captain of the Right, put down the court’s enemies and founded the Kantō regime, the obligations you have incurred for offices, ranks, emoluments, and stipends have in their sum become higher than mountains and deeper than the sea. You must, I am sure, be eager to repay them. Because of the slander of traitors, an unrighteous imperial order has now been issued. Those of you who value your reputations will wish to kill Hideyasu, Taneyoshi, and the others at once in order to secure the patrimony of the three generations of shoguns. If any of you wish to join the ex-emperor, speak out.” — Azuma Kagami, the entry of Jōkyū 3rd year, 19th day of the 5th month [1221 A.D.]

Regent Yoshitoki and his eldest son, Hōjō Yasutoki, responded to the rebellion by regaining Kyoto, resulting in the exile of Go-Toba. Masako continued to consolidate rule under the advisory council, manage relationships and connections between imperial and aristocratic families, and administer judgments and postwar rewards. In an era that acknowledged the authority and legitimacy of women in rule, Masako's dominance enabled the Hōjō clan to dominate the Kamakura Shogunate until the downfall of the government in 1333.

Hōjō Masako died in 1225 at the age of 69. Due to her lifestyle of cloistered rule, she was known as the ama-shōgun, or the "nun-shōgun". Azuma Kagami portrayed her as a peer of Empress Lü in China and Empress Jingū of Japan.

== In Fiction ==
- Shima Iwashita played Hōjō Masako in Kusa Moeru, the 1979 Taiga drama.
- She was the antagonist of the 2021 ONA Yasuke.
- Masako is played by Eiko Koike in The 13 Lords of the Shogun, the 2022 Taiga drama.

== See also ==
- Hōjō clan
- Hōjō Tokimasa
- Hōjō Yoshitoki
- Hōjō Yasutoki
- Hōjō Tokifusa
- Kugyō
- Minamoto no Yoritomo
- Minamoto no Yoriie
- Minamoto no Sanetomo
- Kujō Yoritsune
- Emperor Go-Toba
- Emperor Go-Shirakawa
- Taira no Kiyomori
- Kamakura shogunate

== Sources ==
- Harding, Christopher (2020). The Japanese: A History in Twenty Lives (Google Books ed.). London: Penguin Books. ISBN 9780141992297.
- Henshall, Kenneth (2013). "Minamoto no Sanetomo". Historical Dictionary of Japan to 1945. Historical Dictionaries of Ancient Civilizations and Historical Eras series (Google Books ed.). Scarecrow Press. ISBN 9780810878723.
- Jones, David E. (1997). Women Warriors: a History. Garden City, New York: Brassey's. ISBN 9781574881066.
- McCullough, William (1968). "The Azuma Kagami Account of the Shōkyū War". Monumenta Nipponica. 23 (1/2). Tokyo: Sophia University: 102–155. doi:10.2307/2383110. JSTOR 2383110.
