= Mei Fukuda =

Japanese actress

- 福田愛依
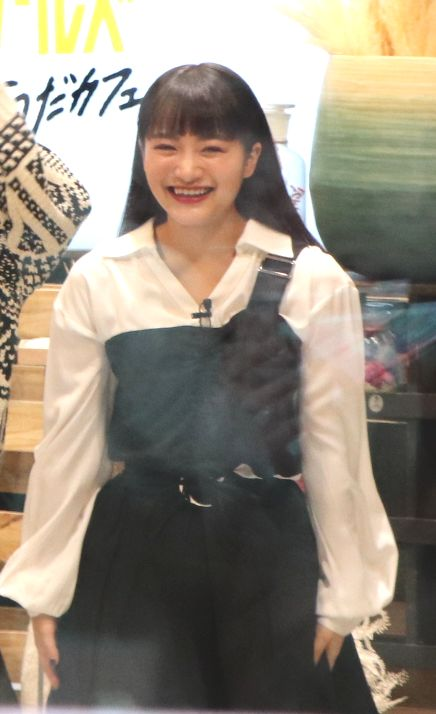
- Fukuda in 2019
- Born: November 8, 2000 (age 24); Dazaifu, Fukuoka, Japan
- Citizenship: Japanese
- Occupation: Actress
- Years active: 2018–present

Mei Fukuda (福田愛依, Fukuda Mei) (born November 8, 2000) is a Japanese actress.

== Career ==
In March 2018, Fukuda won the grand prize at the Miss High School Girl Contest 2017–2018. She served as an official supporter of the Dance Club Championship Vol. 6 in August. Later that November, Fukuda was appointed as one-day chief of the Hakata Police Station in Fukuoka Prefecture.

In February 2019, Fukuda made her acting debut in the seventh episode of Ms. Hiiragi's Homeroom produced by NTN Corporation, as a guest star in the role of a high school girl interviewed on the street. After graduating from high school, she played Ran Shimozono in Toritsuisho! Reiwa produced by Mainichi Broadcasting System and TBS. Later that July, Fukuda played the heroine Donko Hakatano in the FBS 50th anniversary drama Hakata-ben no ko wa kawaii to omote na? produced by Fukuoka Broadcasting System in her hometown of Fukuoka Prefecture. In August, she served as the first cheering supporter for the "K-1 Koshien" tournament.

In February 2020, Fukuda made her stage debut in "Avenue X Theater Vol. 1: X Avenue ni Fukukaze wa Sutekina Merodi o Tsuretekuru" (Avenue X Theater vol.1「バレンタイン・ブルー」～Xアベニューに吹く風は素敵なメロディを連れてくる～; Avenue X Theater Vol. 1: Valentine Blue, The Wind Blowing on Avenue X Brings Wonderful Melody). In August, she became an image character for the "Drunk Driving Eradication Special Content" by the Fukuoka Prefecture Police. In September, Fukuda played her first lead role of Sachiko Sano in episodes 9, 11, and the final episode of TV Tokyo series Girls Gourmet Burger Club. Later that November, she made her film debut in Beautiful Dreamer as herself.

In 2022, Fukuda made her Taiga drama debut in Episode 21 of The 13 Lords of the Shogun, playing the role of Chie, the wife of Hatakeyama Shigetada.

== Filmography ==
=== Film ===
- The Land Beyond the Starry Sky (2021), Keiko Imai

=== Television ===
- The 13 Lords of the Shogun (2022), Chie
