= Minamoto no Ichiman =

Eldest son of Minamoto no Yoriie (1198–1203)

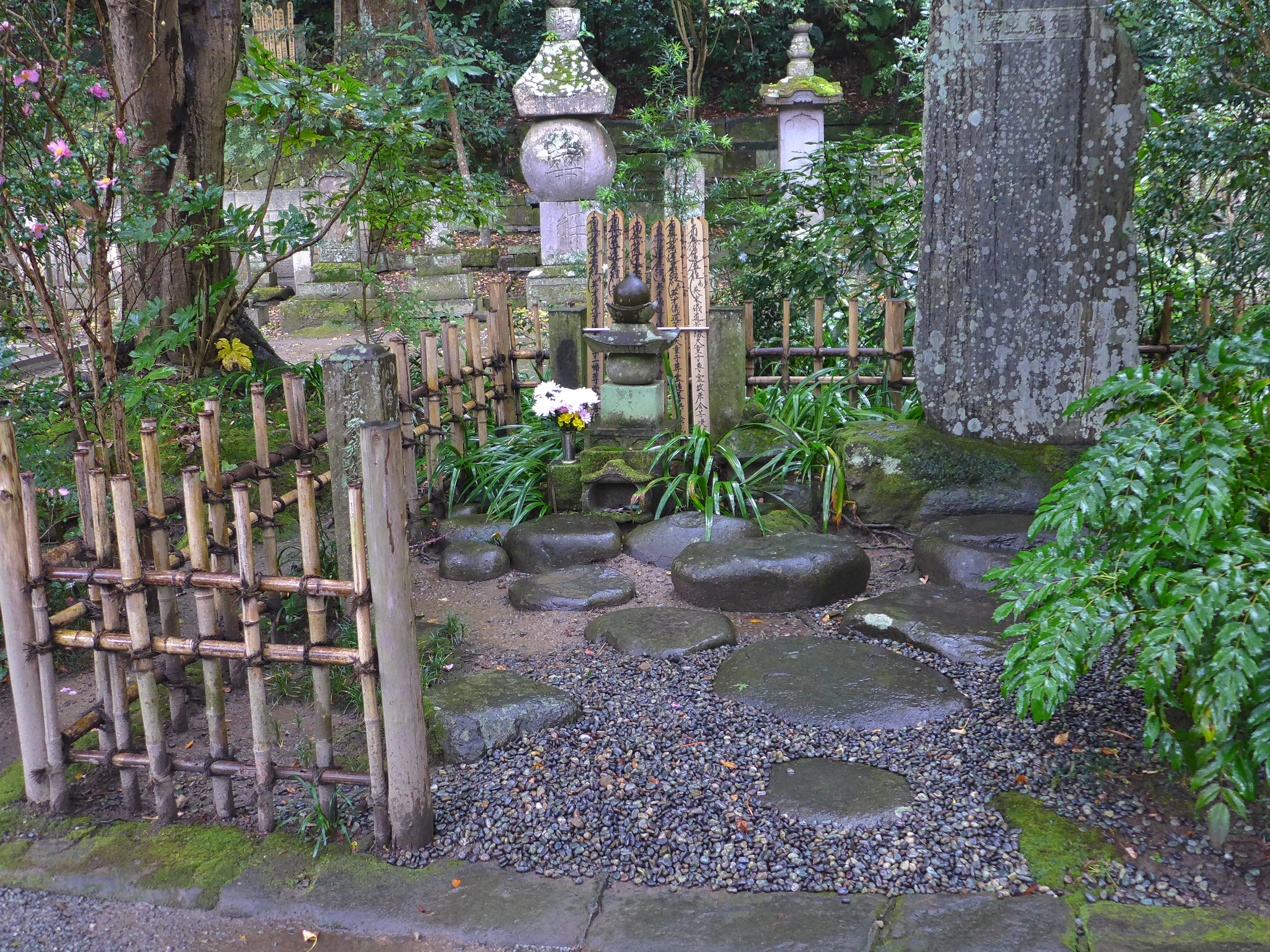
The tomb of Ichiman at Myōhon-ji, Kamakura

Minamoto no Ichiman (源 一幡; 1198 – October 8, 1203) was the eldest son of the 2nd Kamakura shōgun Minamoto no Yoriie. His mother, Wakasa no Tsubone, was Hiki Yoshikazu's daughter, and the child was brought up by the Hiki clan. A year after he was born, his grandfather, Minamoto no Yoritomo, died. The child was murdered at the age of 6. His father would later be murdered a year later.

== Life ==
When in 1203 Yoriie became seriously ill, the Hōjō clan supported his younger brother Senman (future third shōgun Minamoto no Sanetomo) as a future successor, while the Hiki clan supported son Ichiman. To avoid power falling into the hands of the Hiki clan, the Hōjō decided to get rid of the Hiki clan and their protégé.

On a pretext, regent Hōjō Tokimasa invited Hiki Yoshikazu to his home and assassinated him. A battle between the clans ensued; the Hiki were defeated by a coalition of the Hōjō, Wada, Miura and Hatakeyama clans and exterminated. Six-year-old Ichiman also died during the fight. The Hiki residence was destroyed by fire and in its place in the Hikigayatsu valley now lies the Buddhist temple of Myōhon-ji. In its cemetery still stands Ichiman's grave, next to the Hiki clan's cenotaph.

Ichiman's younger brother Kugyō was forced to become a Buddhist priest, and in 1219, he assassinated his uncle, Minamoto no Sanetomo. Kugyō was himself immediately executed for his crime, thus bringing the Minamoto clan to a sudden end.
