= Hiki Yoshikazu =

Japanese samurai-noble of the Kamakura period

- 比企 能員
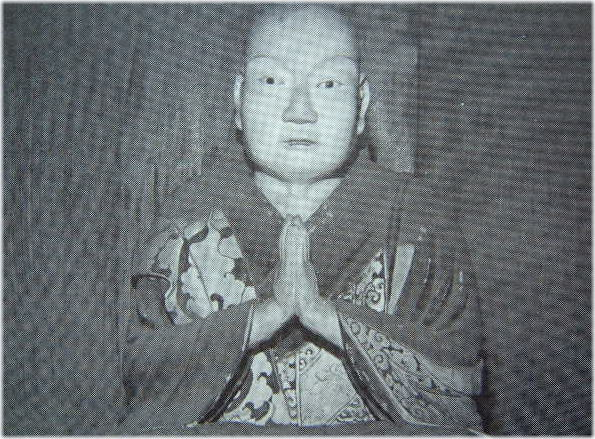
- Hiki Yoshikazu
- Died: October 8, 1203; Kamakura, Japan
- Occupations: Samurai lord, Gokenin
- Known for: Samurai lord, involvement in power struggle in Kamakura Shogunate

Hiki Yoshikazu was a Japanese samurai lord and a powerful gokenin of the Kamakura Shogunate during the Kamakura period. He was related to the ruling Minamoto clan through his daughter's marriage. He, and much of the Hiki clan, were killed for allegedly conspiring to have one of the Minamoto clan's heirs killed, in order to gain power himself.

== Life ==
Originally from Musashi Province, Hiki Yoshikazu rose to prominence in the shogunal government as a result of being adopted by Minamoto no Yoritomo's wet nurse.

Hiki's daughter was married to Minamoto no Yoriie, the second shōgun of the Kamakura shogunate. Seriously ill, Yoriie proposed to name both his younger brother Sanetomo, and his young son (Hiki's grandson) Minamoto no Ichiman to succeed him; the two would split power, governing separate parts of the country. It seemed natural that Hiki would then be the regent, even if unofficially, to young Ichiman. He therefore suggested to Yoriie, who would be assassinated shortly afterwards by a separate faction (the Hōjō clan), that they arrange to have Sanetomo killed. Hōjō Masako, Yoriie's mother and wife of the first shōgun Yoritomo, overheard this conversation.

Though Masako may have sought to have Hiki formally accused of treason and executed, the Hōjō, under Hōjō Tokimasa, got to him first. In their schemes to dominate the regency and control the shogunate as a puppet government under their clan, Hōjō warriors assassinated Hiki Yoshikazu, and then attacked the palace of young Ichiman, setting a fire and killing both the young heir and a great number of members of the extended Hiki family.
