= Shuzen-ji =

Buddhist temple in Shizuoka Prefecture, Japan

Shuzen-ji 修禅寺
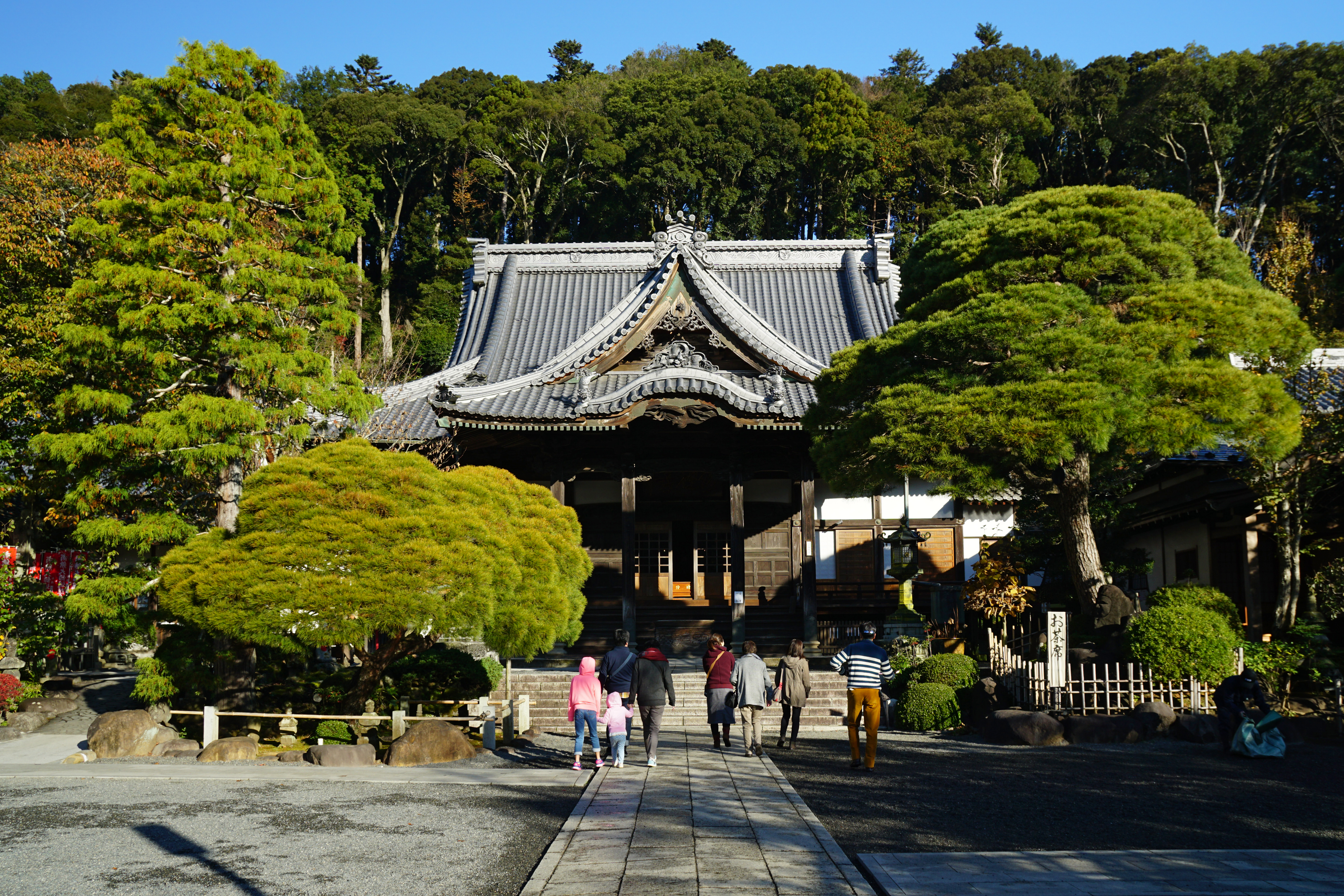
- Main Hall

Religion
- Affiliation: Sōtō

Location
- Location: 964 Shuzenji, Izu, Shizuoka Prefecture
- Country: Japan
- Interactive map of Shuzen-ji 修禅寺
- Coordinates: 34°58′17.4″N 138°55′39.2″E

Architecture
- Founder: Kūkai
- Completed: 807

Website
- http://www.shuzenji-temple.jp/

Shuzen-ji (修禅寺, Shuzenji) is a Buddhist temple in Izu, Shizuoka Prefecture.

Kūkai founded the temple in 807.
