= Hōjō Tokimasa =

1st Shikken of the Kamakura shogunate (1138–1215)

Hōjō Tokimasa 北条 時政
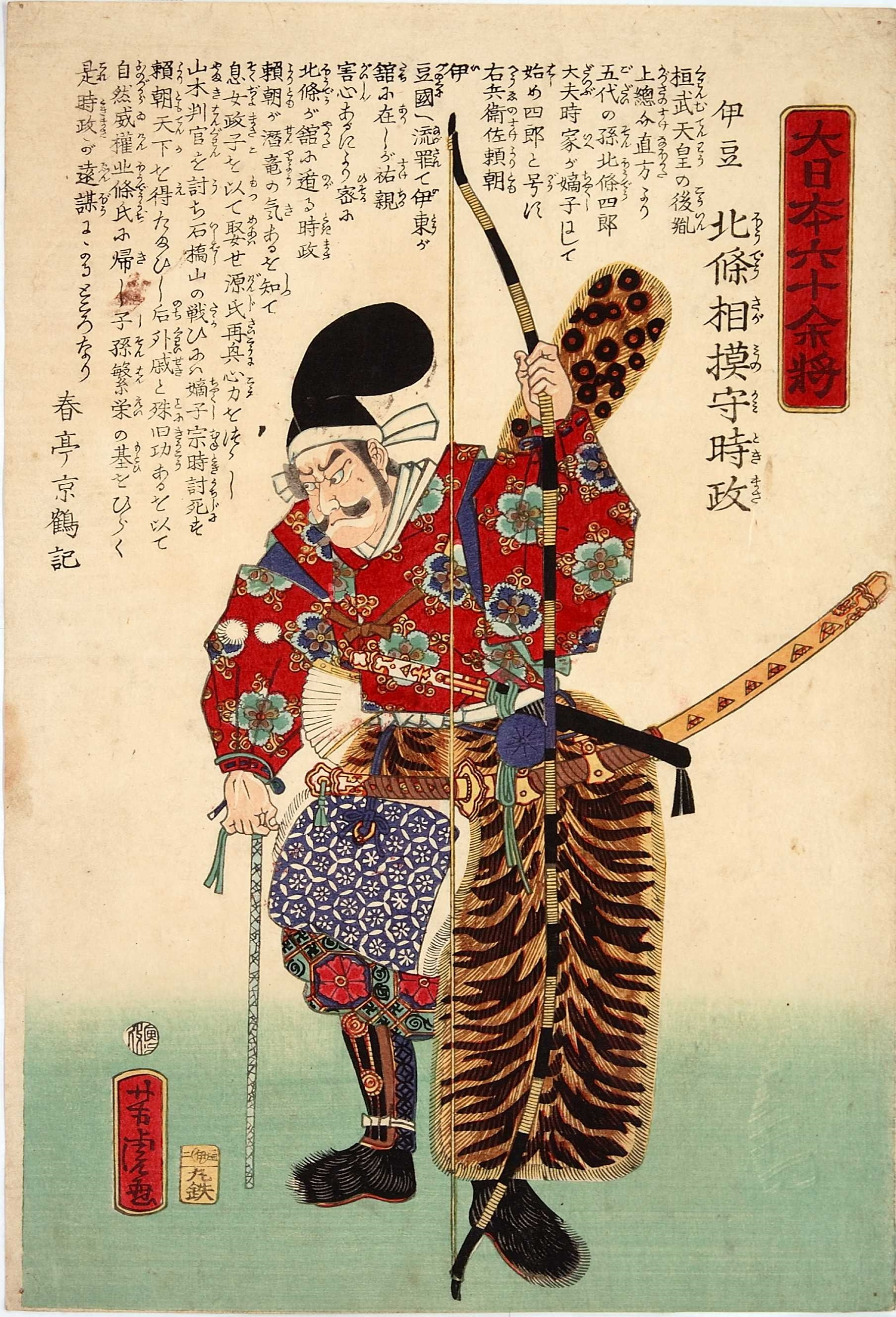
- Hōjō Tokimasa, Governor of Sagami Province in Dai Nihon Rokujūyoshō by Utagawa Yoshitora

Shikken
- In office 1203–1205
- Monarch: Tsuchimikado
- Shōgun: Minamoto no Sanetomo
- Succeeded by: Hōjō Yoshitoki

Council of the Thirteen
- In office 1199–1200 Serving with Ōe no Hiromoto, Miyoshi no Yasunobu, Nakahara no Chikayoshi, Nikaidō Yukimasa, Kajiwara Kagetoki, Adachi Tōmoto, Adachi Morinaga, Hatta Tomoie, Hiki Yoshikazu, Hōjō Yoshitoki, Miura Yoshizumi, Wada Yoshimori

Protector of Kyoto
- In office 1185–1186
- Succeeded by: Ichijō Yoshiyasu

Personal details
- Born: 1138
- Died: February 6, 1215 (aged 76-77)
- Spouse(s): Daughter of Itō Sukechika; Maki no Kata
- Children: Hōjō Munetoki; Awa no Tsubone; Hōjō Yoshitoki; Hōjō Masanori; Hōjō Masako; Hōjō Tokiko; Hōjō Tokifusa; eight other daughters
- Parents: Hōjō Tokikata (father); daughter of Izu Tamefusa (mother)
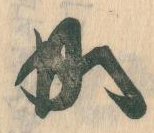
- Signature

Hōjō Tokimasa (北条 時政; Japanese pronunciation: [hoː.(d)ʑoː (|) to.kʲiꜜ.ma.sa], 1138 – February 6, 1215) was a Japanese samurai lord who was the first shikken (regent) of the Kamakura shogunate and head of the Hōjō clan. He was shikken from 1203 until his abdication in 1205, and Protector of Kyoto from 1185 to 1186.

== Background ==
The Hōjō clan is alleged to have been descended from the Taira clan. The Hōjō clan based themselves in a northern part of the Izu Province, which was in the east (Kanto region) and quite far away from the imperial center of power in Kyoto.

== Early life ==
Not much is known about Hōjō Tokimasa's early life prior to Minamoto no Yoritomo's arrival in Izu. There is no information about his parents and early childhood, mainly because culture was not concentrated in Izu, but rather in Kyoto. Tokimasa was born in 1138 into the influential local magnate Hōjō clan in the province of Izu. It is believed that his father was either Hōjō Tokikata or Hōjō Tokikane.

Tokimasa, as the head of the Hōjō clan, chose to stay out of the civil strife engulfing western Japan based on court succession disputes between the Cloistered Emperor Toba, his son Cloistered Emperor Go-Shirakawa, and Emperor Sutoku--who would be deposed in the fallout of the Hōgen Rebellion. This also facilitated the rivalry between the Minamoto clan under Minamoto no Yoshitomo and the Taira clan under Taira no Kiyomori.

These two disturbances, known as the Hōgen Rebellion and Heiji Rebellion, ended in a Taira victory and the rule of the Cloistered Emperors Toba and Go-Shirakawa. Minamoto no Yoshitomo of the Minamoto clan was executed in 1160; all but three of his sons were also executed, and his daughters sent to convents. Of the three sons that were spared, Minamoto no Yoshitsune and Minamoto no Noriyori were sent to Buddhist monasteries, while his eldest son, Minamoto no Yoritomo, only 13 years old, was exiled to Tokimasa's domain of Izu.

The name of Tokimasa's first official wife is not known. She and Tokimasa had two sons, Hōjō Munetoki (北条宗時, his first son, the date of birth is not clear) and Hōjō Yoshitoki, who became his heir later, in 1163. Tokimasa later married to Maki no Kata, who became his second official wife, and they had another son, Hōjō Masanori, in 1189. Tokimasa also had another son, Hōjō Tokifusa, with an unknown woman. Tokifusa's date of birth is estimated to be in 1175. Tokimasa also had many daughters. His first daughter, Hōjō Masako, who was born in 1156, later married Yoritomo as his wife. Awa no Tsubone, probably born in 1169, later became Yoritomo's sister-in-law, as she married Ano Zenjo, Yoritomo's younger brother.

Yoritomo, at first, was just another political exile of the Taira living in Izu, but as Taira brutality grew against the Japanese people and the imperial court and nobles, the court itself grew weary of Taira rule, and particularly of the brutal Taira no Kiyomori.

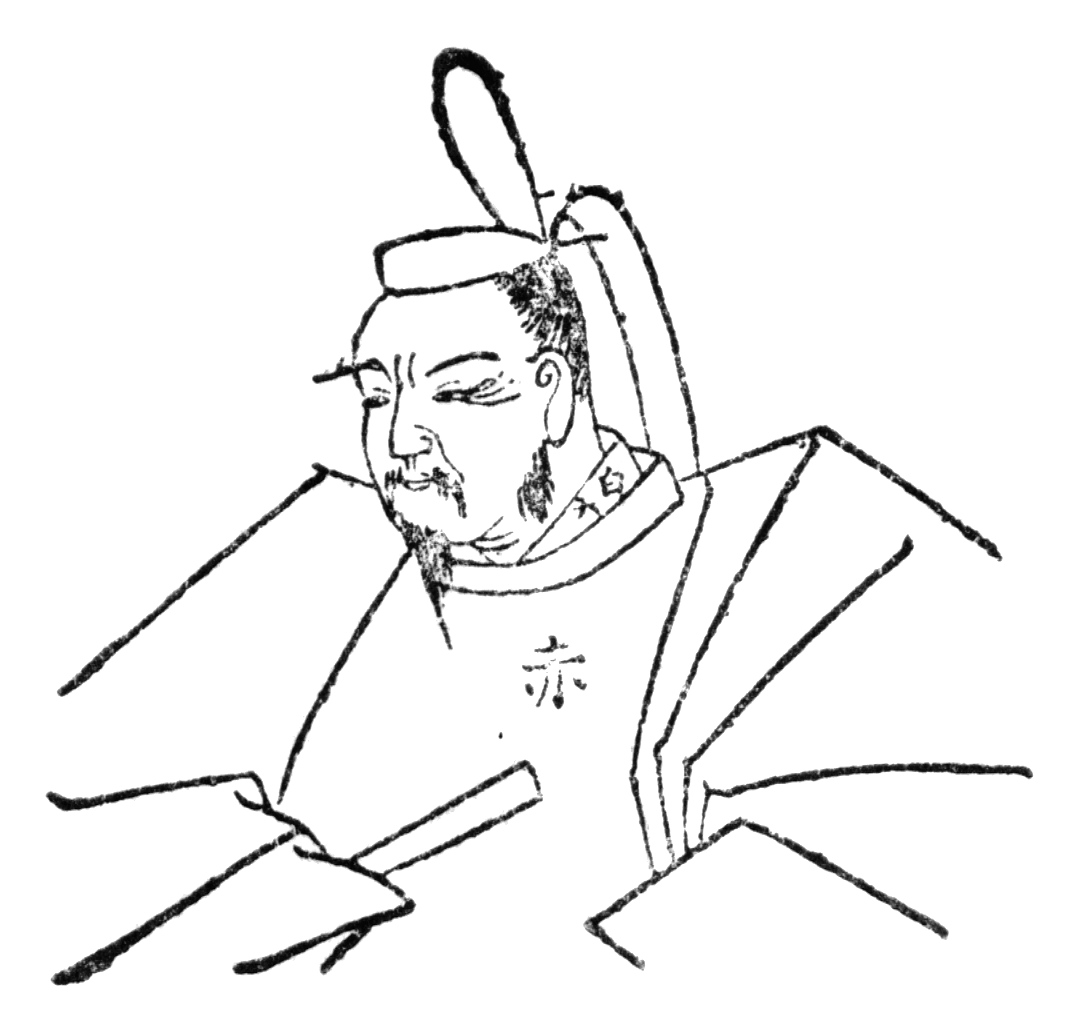
Hōjō Tokimasa by Kurihara Nobumitsu

In 1179, Minamoto no Yoritomo, the Minamoto exile from Kyoto, fell in love with Tokimasa's daughter, Masako. In around 1180, they wed. That same year, Prince Mochihito, a son of Cloistered Emperor Go-Shirakawa and a brother of Cloistered Emperor Takakura and thus an uncle of Emperor Antoku, who was half-Taira and had been placed on the throne by the Taira, believed the Taira had denied him the throne and called on the exiled Minamoto leaders to go to war and oust the Taira. Yoritomo declared war on the Taira, thus gaining his father-in-law, Tokimasa's support and the support of the Hōjō clan. That same year, Masako and Yoritomo had a daughter, Ō-hime, Tokimasa's first grandchild.

== Genealogy ==
Parents

- Father: Hōjō Tokikata (北条 時方)
- Mother: Daughter of Tomo no Tamefusa (伴 為房)

Consorts and issue:

- Wife: Daughter of Itō Sukechika (伊東 祐親, also known as Itō Nyūdō (伊東入道))
  - Son: Hōjō Munetoki (北条 宗時; d.1180)
  - Daughter: Awa no Tsubone (阿波局; d.1227), married to Ano Zenjō (阿野 全成), elder brother of Minamoto no Yoshitsune
  - Son: Hōjō Yoshitoki (北条 義時; 1163–1224)
- Wife: Maki no Kata (牧の方)
  - Son: Hōjō Masanori (北条 政範; 1189–1204)
  - Daughter: married to Hiraga Tomomasa (平賀 朝雅), and later to Fujiwara no Kunimichi (藤原 国通)
  - Daughter: married to Inage Shigenari (稲毛 重成)
  - Daughter: married to Utsunomiya Yoritsuna (宇都宮 頼綱)
  - Daughter: married to Bōmon Tadakiyo (坊門 忠清)
- Wife: Unknown women
  - Son: Hōjō Tokifusa (北条 時房; d.1175-1240)
  - Daughter: Hōjō Masako (北条 政子; 1157–1225), married to Minamoto no Yoritomo (源 頼朝)
  - Daughter: Hōjō Tokiko (北条 時子; d.1196), daughter of the same mother as Masako, married to Ashikaga Yoshikane (足利 義兼)
  - Daughter: married to Hatakeyama Shigetada (畠山 重忠), and later to Ashikaga Yoshizumi (足利 義純)
  - Daughter (d.1216): married to Shigenoi Sanenobu (滋野井 実宣)
  - Daughter: married to Kawano Michinobu (河野 通信)
  - Daughter: married to Ōoka Tokichika (大岡 時親)

== Genpei War ==
Yoritomo created his base and capital at Kamakura, in Izu. Tokimasa became his de facto advisor. The Genpei War between Minamoto and Taira had begun. In 1181, Taira no Kiyomori died, leaving the Taira family in the hands of Taira no Munemori, his son and a hothead who had no knowledge of military matters. In 1182, Tokimasa's son, Yoshitoki, wed. That same year, Masako and Yoritomo had a son, Minamoto no Yoriie, Yoritomo's heir. This would also become Tokimasa's first male grandchild. The next year, Yoshitoki and his wife had their first child, a son, Hōjō Yasutoki, who would become heir to the Hōjō after Yoshitoki's death.

Things were going well for the Minamoto against the Taira. In 1183, Minamoto no Yoshinaka, Yoritomo's cousin, took Kyoto before Yoritomo could. That same year, Yoshitsune and Noriyori, Yoritomo's brothers, arrived in Kamakura and joined the Gempei War on the side of Yoritomo. In 1184, Minamoto no Yoshitsune took Kyoto in the name of Yoritomo, and had Yoshinaka executed. By that time, the Taira had fled with the Emperor Antoku to Shikoku, and, in his place, the Minamoto (with the support of Cloistered Emperor Go-Shirakawa) enthroned Emperor Go-Toba, a younger brother of Antoku. In 1185, Yoshitsune defeated the Taira at the Battle of Ichi-no-Tani. Taira no Munemori and Taira no Shigehira were executed in Kyoto and Nara respectively, while the rest of the Taira, including Kiyomori's widow Taira no Tokiko and Emperor Antoku drowned at the Battle of Dannoura.

Minamoto no Yoritomo was then the undisputed de facto ruler of Japan, and the Genpei War was over with a Minamoto victory. Hōjō no Tokimasa was then in a very good position. Yoritomo did not move to Kyoto, but remained in Kamakura with Tokimasa.

Tokimasa was sent to Kyoto and the court of Emperor Go-Toba and Cloistered Emperor Go-Shirakawa. He received an imperial command for Yoritomo to "hunt down" Minamoto no Yukiie and Minamoto no Yoshitsune for their rebellion.

When he returned, the first appointments of shugo and jitō, the stewards and constables of the Kamakura bakufu, were apparently granted. In 1189, Yoritomo consolidated his power, executing his half brothers Yoshitsune and Noriyori.

In 1192, after the birth of Yoritomo's and Masako's second son, Minamoto no Sanetomo, Minamoto no Yoritomo was granted the title of shōgun by Cloistered Emperor Go-Shirakawa, who died later that year. Tokimasa, as the head of the Hōjō clan, was thus the head of one of the most powerful families in Japan – he was the father-in-law of the shōgun.

== Minamoto no Yoritomo assassination attempt ==
The Revenge of the Soga Brothers incident occurred on June 28, 1193, during the Fuji no Makigari hunting event arranged by shogun Minamoto no Yoritomo and prepared by Tokimasa. The Soga brothers, Soga Sukenari and Tokimune assassinated Kudō Suketsune, the killer of their biological father. In Azuma Kagami and Soga Monogatari, after killing Suketsune, Tokimune also attempted to assassinate the shogun Minamoto no Yoritomo, which is interpreted as a result of Tokimasa's secret maneuvers. Tokimasa had entered Suruga Province and Fujino in advance, before Yoritomo, as a preparation for his secret plan. Furthermore, before that, Tokimasa had established a strong relationship with the Soga brothers, and especially with Tokimune, being his guardian during genpuku and bestowing one of the kanji in his name to Tokimune.

Hiroyuki Miura, along with many others have debated that it was through Tokimasa's strong relation to the Soga brothers that led Tokimune to attack the shogun.

== Kamakura shogunate ==
In 1199, Minamoto no Yoritomo died. He was succeeded by his son and heir, Minamoto no Yoriie, who himself was considered a minor at the age of 18. Yoriie was closer with his father-in-law, Hiki Yoshikazu, than he was with his grandfather, Tokimasa. He despised his mother, his uncles and the Hōjō family in general. He was thus independent and rash, unlike his father who depended on the Hōjō.

In that year, a regency council was created by Tokimasa, Masako, and Yoshitoki. The most powerful person there (not counting the remaining Minamoto members and the Hōjō) was Kajiwara Kagetoki, the governor of Sagami. Though he was very close with Yoritomo and trusted by Tokimasa, Yoriie disliked him, and he was executed in Suruga by the shogunate army in 1200. Though it is generally accepted that Yoriie was responsible for the order, it is believed that Tokimasa and the Hōjō might have also been behind it since the Hōjō clan gained the province of Sagami after his death. Tokimasa was made daimyō of Ōmi Province in the same year.

Tokimasa's scheming next turned towards his grandson's father-in-law, Hiki Yoshikazu, who his grandson listened to more than he listened to his regent, Tokimasa. Losing hope of getting either Yoriie or Yoshikazu on his side, Tokimasa focused his efforts on his other grandson, Yoriie's younger brother and Yoritomo's youngest son, Sanetomo.

In 1203, the 21-year-old Yoriie became extremely ill and weak, and Tokimasa produced a plan whereby Japan would be divided between Sanetomo and Minamoto no Ichiman, Yoriie's son, who was close to the Hōjō and expected to become the next shōgun. Yoshikazu began suspecting foul play based on the actions and behaviours of Tokimasa, Masako, Ichiman and Sanetomo. He began plotting to either capture or assassinate Tokimasa.

With the help of Ōe no Hiromoto, a trusted ally, Tokimasa found out about the plan and invited Yoshikazu to his home in Kamakura for Buddhist services. After Yoshikazu exited the temple, troops belonging to the shogunate and Hojo clan, executed him. Following that, Hōjō troops entered the Hiki residence and executed high-ranking members of the clan, including Minamoto no Ichiman, who, though close to Tokimasa, was also close to his maternal grandfather. Shōgun Yoriie, who was bedridden, abdicated. He went into personal exile in Shuzenji in Izu province but was murdered in 1204. It is thought that this was another plot by Tokimasa.

=== Minamoto no Sanetomo ===
After the death of Yoriie and Ichiman, Tokimasa installed Yoritomo's second son, Minamoto no Sanetomo, as the next shōgun. Tokimasa began to chair the Mandokoro, while he and Ōe no Hiromoto exercised absolute power. In 1204, after the assassination of Yoriie, Hōjō Masako lost trust in her father, as she believed that he was behind the assassination of her son.

Soon afterwards, Tokimasa was convinced by one of his allies, Hiraga Tomomasa, that Hatakeyama Shigetada, who was married to Tokimasa's youngest daughter, was inciting rebellion in Kyoto against the Hōjō. Tokimasa, angered, ordered his two sons, Hōjō Yoshitoki, his heir, and his other son, Hōjō Tokifusa, to execute Hatakeyama. Yoshitoki and Tokifusa, who enjoyed good relations with their brother-in-law, protested, but Tokimasa ordered the execution of Hatakeyama himself. From then on, Yoshitoki, Tokifusa, and their younger sister lost trust in their father and his meddling. It is believed Hatakeyama was a rival power-holder to Tokimasa.

== Later life ==
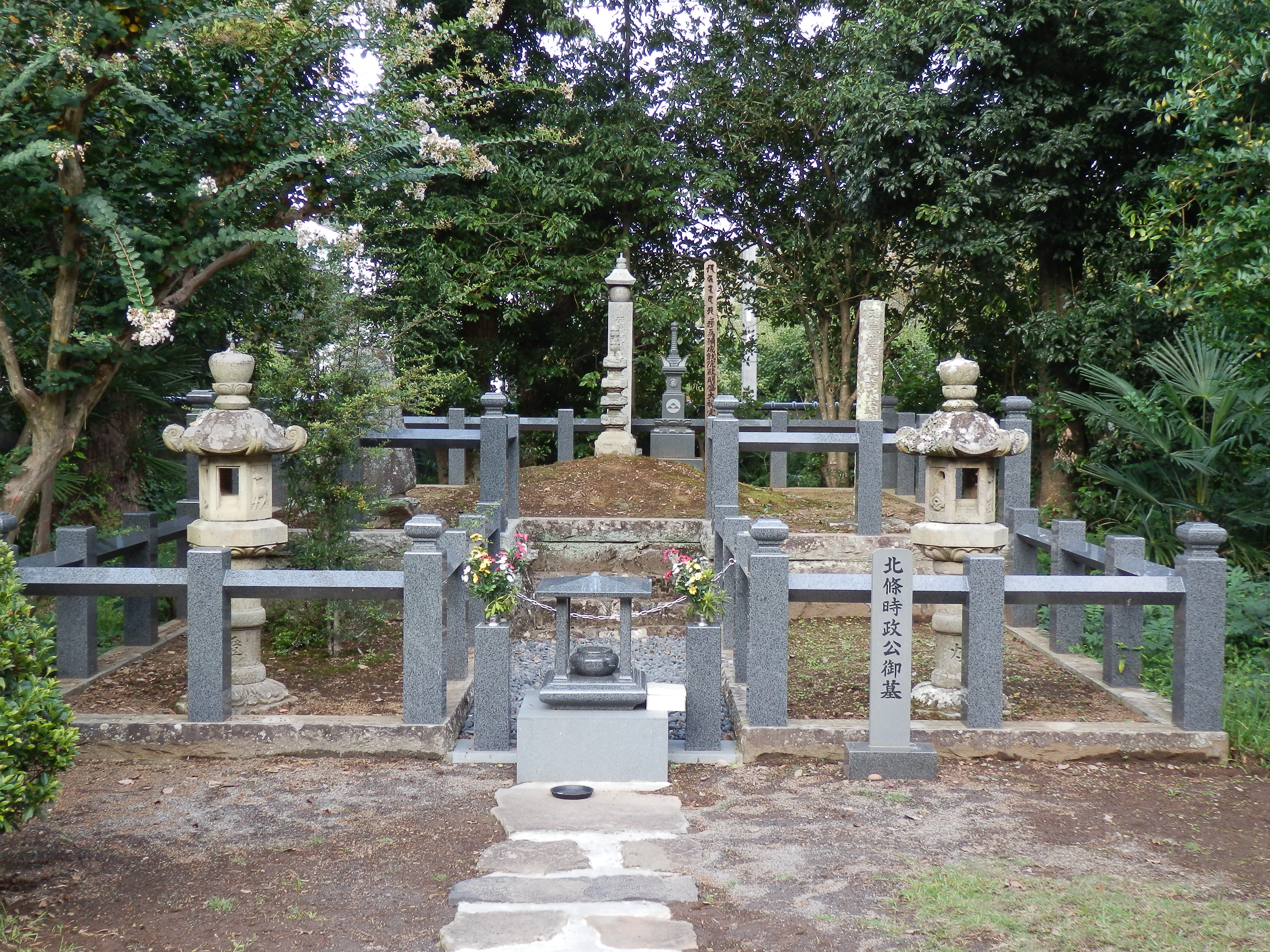
The grave of Hōjō Tokimasa, in Izunokuni, Shizuoka Prefecture, Japan

In 1205, Yoshitoki heard rumors from samurai and retainer that Tokimasa was planning to have Shogun Sanetomo assassinated. He heard that the heir was none other than Hiraga, who was responsible for the death of Hatakeyama. Yoshitoki, furious, and Masako, who was also scared about the fate of her last son, put Sanetomo under protective guard and had Hiraga executed in Kamakura in 1205. Yoshitoki then threatened to rebel against his father.

Tokimasa realized that Shogun Sanetomo was under protection, and he had no more allies left. He thus shaved his head, became a Buddhist monk, and retired from his post of shikken and head of the Hōjō family. He was succeeded by his eldest son and heir, Hōjō Yoshitoki, who became regent for Shogun Sanetomo and thus the second Hōjō shikken.

Tokimasa retired to a Buddhist monastery in Kamakura where he lived out the remaining years of his life, dying in 1215 at the age of 78.

== See also ==
- Kamakura, Kanagawa

Preceded by (none)	Hōjō Regent; 1199–1205	Succeeded by Hōjō Yoshitoki
Preceded by (none)	Tokusō (ceremonially); 1199–1205	Succeeded by Hōjō Yoshitoki
