= Minamoto no Sanetomo =

Japanese Samurai, Daimyo and Military ruler of Japan from 1203 to 1219

- 源 実朝
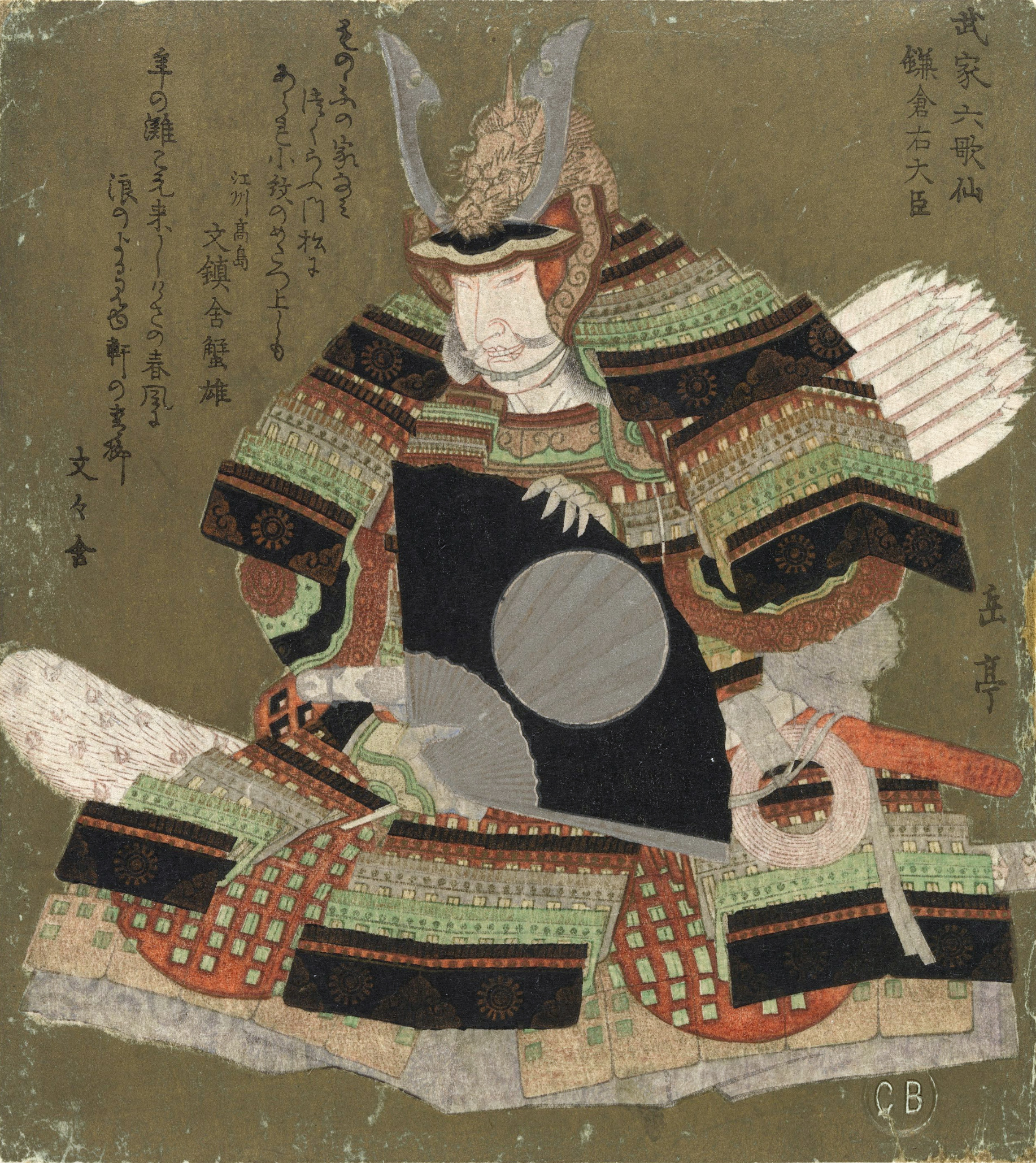
- Portrait by Yashima Gakutei, c. 1825

Shōgun
- In office 1203–1219
- Monarchs: Tsuchimikado; Juntoku
- Shikken: Hōjō Tokimasa; Hōjō Yoshitoki
- Preceded by: Minamoto no Yoriie
- Succeeded by: Kujō Yoritsune

Personal details
- Born: September 17, 1192
- Died: February 13, 1219 (aged 26)
- Spouse: Bomon Nobuko
- Parents: Minamoto no Yoritomo (father); Hōjō Masako (mother)
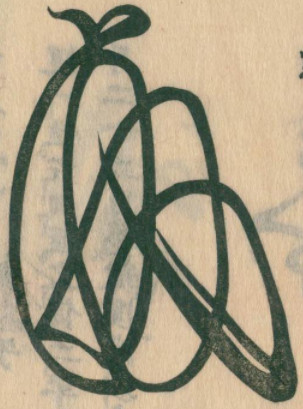
- Signature

Military service
- Allegiance: Minamoto clan
- Branch/service: Minamoto clan

Minamoto no Sanetomo (源 実朝; Kyujitai: 源 實朝󠄁; Japanese pronunciation: [mʲì.nä́.mó̞.tó̞ nó̞ | sä̀.né̞.tó̞.mó̞, -nó̞ sä́-]; September 12, 1192 – February 13, 1219, r. 1203–1219) was a Japanese samurai, daimyo and the third shōgun of the Kamakura shogunate. He was the second son of the Kamakura shogunate founder, Minamoto no Yoritomo. His mother was Hōjō Masako and his older brother was the second Kamakura shogun Minamoto no Yoriie.

His childhood name was Senman (千万). He was the last head of the Minamoto clan of Japan. His Dharma name was Daijijiden seini'i goshoko jingi (大慈寺殿正二位丞相公神儀).

He was an accomplished waka poet.

== Early life ==
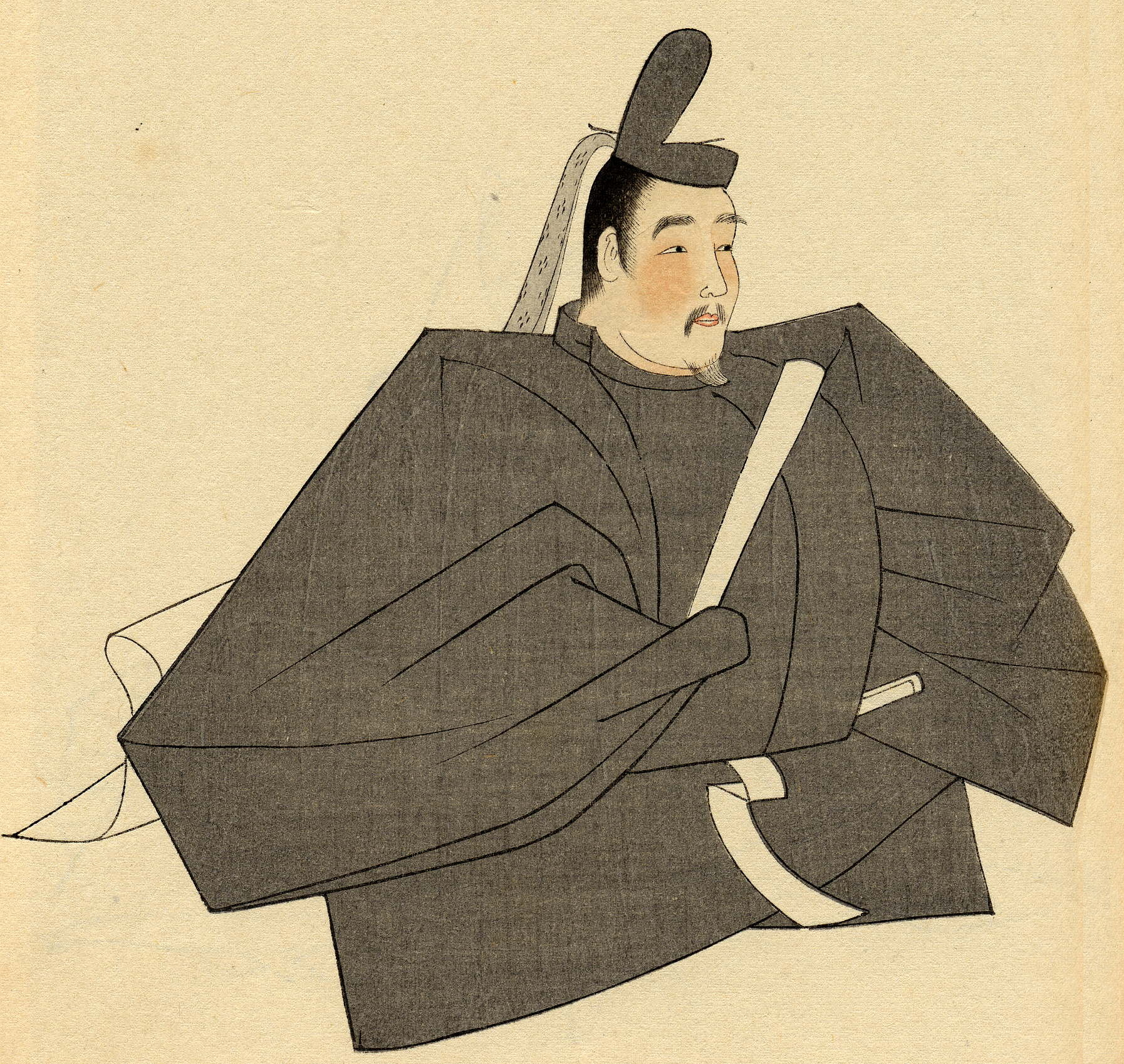
Sanetomo in court clothing, painting by the priest Goshin.

After the death of Yoritomo in 1199, Sanetomo's maternal grandfather Hōjō Tokimasa usurped the political and military power of the Shogunate, relegating the position and title of Sei-i Taishōgun, or shōgun, to a figurehead. Through hereditary succession, Sanetomo's older brother Yoriie became Sei-i Taishōgun in 1202, only to be stripped of the title a year later and put under house arrest for plotting against the Hōjō clan. This was presumably to keep the shōgun a child and thus needing a regent (shikken) to make decisions in his place. Shortly thereafter, in 1203, Sanetomo became head of the Minamoto clan and was appointed Sei-i Taishōgun.

A year later, Yoriie was assassinated by the Hōjō. Sanetomo was never more than a puppet for his mother Hōjō Masako and maternal uncle Hōjō Yoshitoki, who used him as a pawn in their war with their father Tokimasa; Tokimasa tried to depose his grandson a number of times, beginning in 1205, causing Sanetomo to fear for his life thereafter.

=== Waka poet ===
Sanetomo, understanding his own powerlessness and not wanting to meet the same fate as his elder brother, put his time and energy into writing waka poetry and gaining posts within the powerless but honorary imperial court. Sanetomo was a talented poet, writing over 700 poems between the age 17 and 22 while he was tutored by Fujiwara no Teika. He published his private waka collection Kinkai Wakashū, even having one of his tanka included in the anthology Ogura Hyakunin Isshu ("100 Poems by 100 Poets"), a collection of Japanese poems of the Heian and early Kamakura periods. Sanetomo reached the third-highest post of the imperial court, Udaijin (Minister of the Right or "vice-premier") in 1218.

Eventually, Sanetomo lapsed into inactivity and despair, plagued by fear of assassination and tormented by his chronic alcoholism (an addiction which Priest Eisai once tried to break by replacing alcohol with tea).

=== Death ===
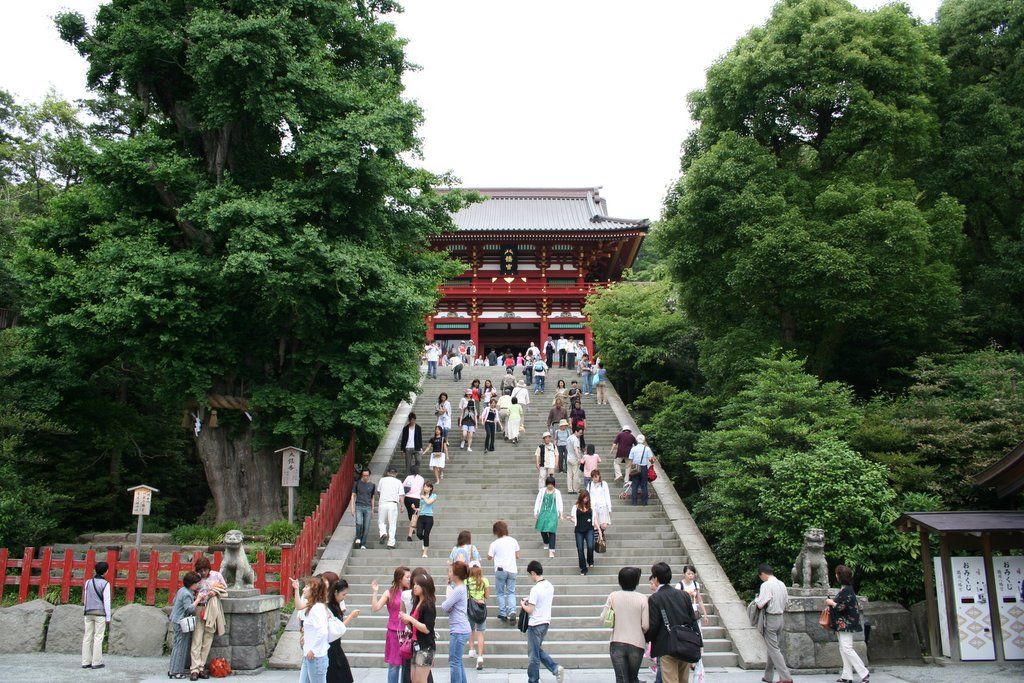
Grand stairway at Tsurugaoka Hachiman-gū in Kamakura – the scene of Sanetomo's assassination

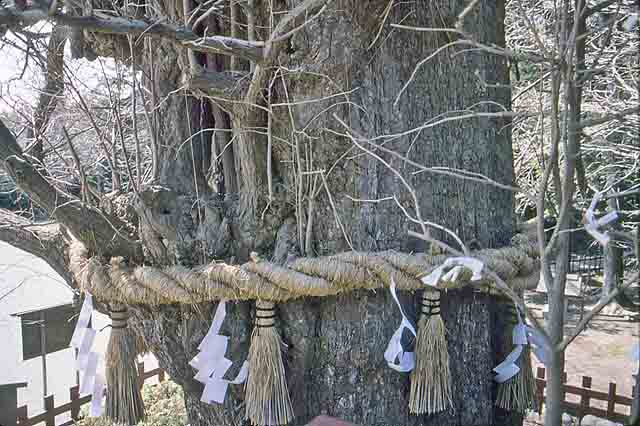
Shinto symbolism encompasses the girth of the ancient ginkgo tree at the foot of the stairs leading to the upper level of Kamakura's great Hachiman Shrine. The tree, near the spot where Sanetomo was ambushed and killed, was blown down on 10 March 2010.

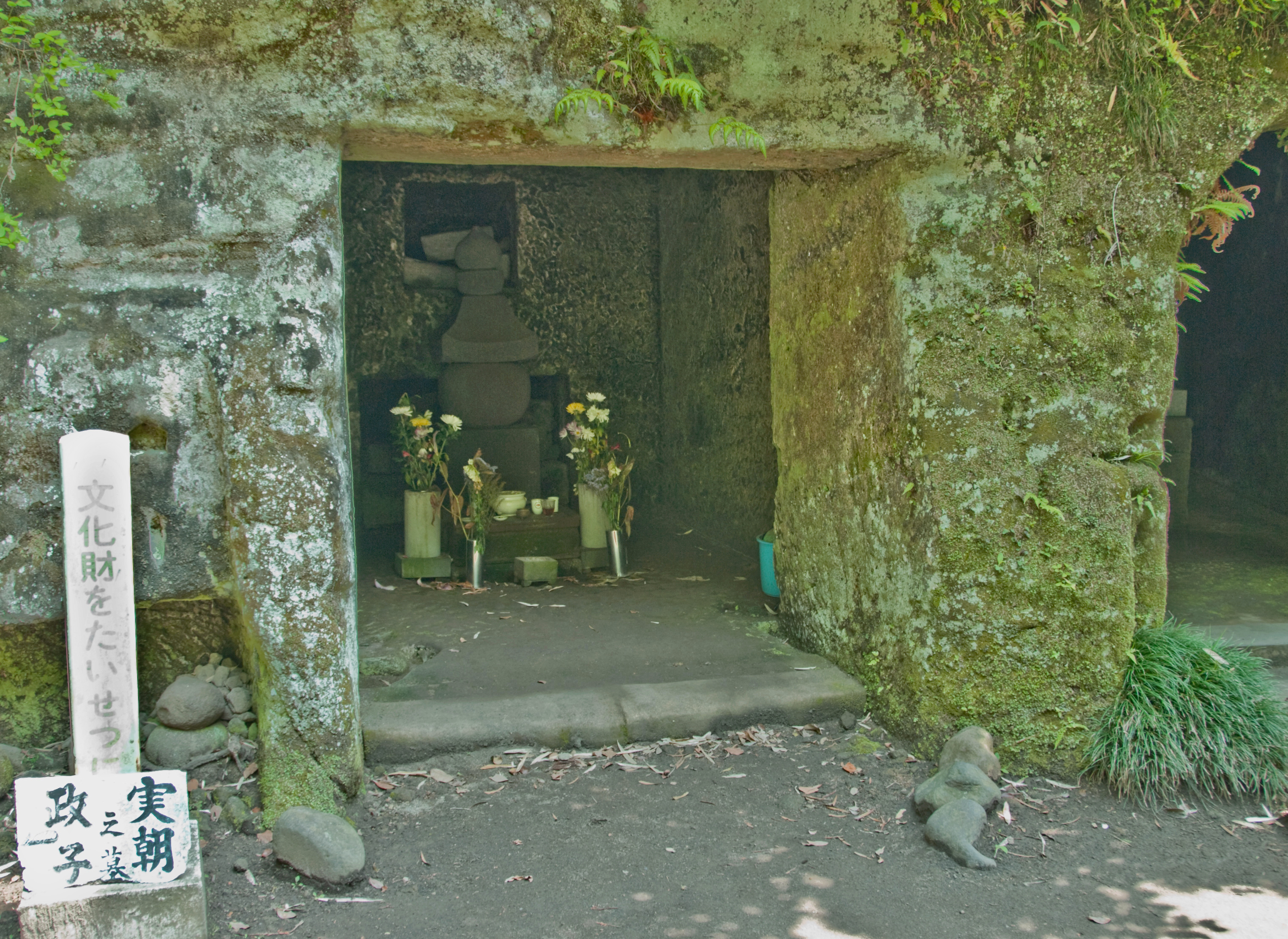
Cenotaph honoring Sanetomo in Kamakura's Jufuku-ji's cemetery

Under heavy snow on the evening of February 13, 1219 (Jōkyū 1, 27th day of the 1st month), Sanetomo was coming down from the Senior Shrine at Tsurugaoka Hachiman-gū after participating in a ceremony celebrating his nomination to Udaijin. His adopted heir and nephew, son of the deposed Yoriie, Kugyō, came out from beside the stone stairway of the shrine and assassinated him. For his act, he was himself beheaded a few hours later, thus bringing the Seiwa Genji line of the Minamoto clan and their rule in Kamakura to a sudden end.

Minamoto no Sanetomo was succeeded by Kujō Yoritsune, son-in-law of Yoriie, as fourth shōgun of the Kamakura shogunate.

== Family ==
- Father: Minamoto no Yoritomo
- Mother: Hōjō Masako

== Eras of Sanetomo's bakufu ==
The years in which Sanetomo was shogun are more specifically identified by more than one era name or nengō.

- Kennin (1201–1204)
- Genkyū (1204–1206)
- Ken'ei (1206–1207)
- Jōgen (Kamakura period) (1207–1211)
- Kenryaku (1211–1213)
- Kenpō (1213–1219)
- Jōkyū (1219–1222)

== See also ==
- Azuma Kagami

== Notes ==
Preceded by Minamoto no Yoriie	Shōgun: Minamoto no Sanetomo; 1203–1219	Succeeded by Kujō Yoritsune
