= Azuma Kagami =

Japanese chronicles

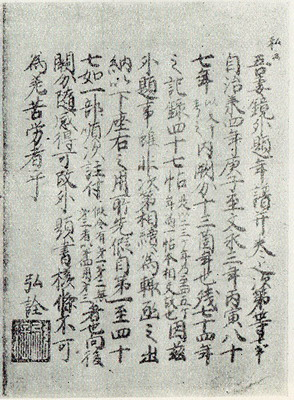
A page of the Azuma Kagami

Azuma Kagami (吾妻鏡／東鑑, Japanese pronunciation: [a.(d)zɯ.ma kaꜜ.ɡa.mʲi, -ŋa.mʲi], lit. 'Mirror of the East') is a Japanese historical chronicle.

The medieval text chronicles events of the Kamakura Shogunate from Minamoto no Yoritomo's rebellion against the Taira clan in Izokuni of 1180 to Munetaka Shinnō (the 6th shōgun) and his return to Kyoto in 1266. The work is also called Hōjōbon (北条本) after the Later Hōjō family of Odawara (Kanagawa prefecture), in whose possession it used to be before it was donated to Tokugawa Ieyasu. It originally consisted of 52 chapters, but the 45th is lost. In spite of its many flaws, the document is considered the most important existing document concerning the Kamakura period.

== History ==
The Azuma Kagami was compiled after 1266 under the directive of the Hōjō shikken (officially a regent to a shōgun, but the de facto ruler) and is a record in diary form of events occurring in Japan. Written in a Japanized version of classical Chinese known as hentai kanbun (変体漢文), the massive work was incomprehensible to most Japanese until an edition with furigana glosses was published in 1626. It was given in present to shōgun Tokugawa Ieyasu in 1603, who obtained the missing section from other daimyos and then ordered the preparation and publication of the Fushimi version of the Azuma Kagami in Kokatsujiban, the old movable-type printing. This edition in turn became the basis for the present printed editions. Ieyasu considered the book as the product of historical wisdom, kept it at his side, and consulted it often.

== Content ==
The Azuma Kagami is an enormously detailed record of different activities centering on the shōgun with almost daily entries that include even notes on the weather. It used to be considered an official Kamakura Bakufu diary, but it contains sections about events in distant areas written on the day of occurrence. Such entries are therefore believed to have been added later. Its content goes from the words and the deeds of the shōgun, officials, and military men to poems, literary pieces, descriptions of hunts, banquets and notes on the weather. It is therefore likely to be a compilation of information about the Hōjō regency period taken from Hōjō, Adachi and other noble houses archives, plus temple and shrine records. Predictably, it is heavily biased towards a Hōjō point of view but, because of its painstaking attention to details, it is nonetheless an important document to understand the Kamakura Bakufu.

== Weng Guangping and the Wuqi jing bu ==
Chinese scholar Weng Guangping (1760–1847) read a copy of the book in China, and found it valuable but marred by errors. After struggling to obtain a complete copy, he decided to correct, expand and amend it using other Japanese and Chinese texts dealing with Japan. After seven years of work, in 1814 he finished the Wuqi jing bu, or "Emendations to the Azuma Kagami". The Wuqi jing bu had, as far as we know, two editions, one consisting of 28 and the other of 30 chapters, both handwritten. Because Weng had never been to Japan, the book had major limitations in various areas, but it nonetheless became a valuable introduction to Japan and its culture.

This book has only been reprinted once, by a Japanese publisher.

== See also ==
- Japanese Historical Text Initiative
