= Taiheiki (TV series) =

1991 taiga drama about Shogun Ahikaga Takauji

- Genre: Historical, jidaigeki
- Based on: Shihon Taiheiki (私本太平記) by Eiji Yoshikawa
- Written by: Shunsaku Ikehata; Shigeo Nakakura
- Directed by: Mikio Satō and others
- Starring: Hiroyuki Sanada; Yasuko Sawaguchi; Tetsuya Takeda; Jinpachi Nezu; Takanori Jinnai; Toshirō Yanagiba; Daijirō Tsusumi; Masanobu Takashima; Masahiro Motoki; Rie Miyazawa; Yasuo Daichi; Akira Emoto; Takaaki Enoki; Tokuma Nishioka; Hiroshi Katsuno; Kiyoshi Kodama; Tsurutaro Kataoka; Kanako Higuchi; Masaomi Kondō; Mieko Harada; Frankie Sakai; Shiho Fujimura; Ken Ogata; Kataoka Takao
- Narrated by: Motoyo Yamane
- Theme music composer: Shigeaki Saegusa
- Composer: Shigeaki Saegusa
- Country of origin: Japan
- Original language: Japanese
- No. of episodes: 49

Production
- Producers: Yasuo Takahashi; Kunihisa Ichiyanagi
- Production location: Japan
- Running time: 45 minutes

Original release
- Network: NHK
- Release: January 6 – December 8, 1991

Taiheiki (太平記) is a 1991 Japanese historical television series and the 29th NHK taiga drama. It is based on the 1958 novel Shihon Taiheiki by Eiji Yoshikawa. It had an average viewership rating of 26.0%, peaking at 34.6%.

== Plot ==
The drama is set at the end of the Kamakura period, going into the Nanboku-chō period during the early Muromachi period. Ashikaga Takauji, a rising warlord in the north of Japan, forms an alliance with Emperor Go-Daigo to overthrow the corrupt and decrepit Kamakura shogunate. The emperor, seeking to restore Imperial rule, begins the Kenmu Restoration, but fails to please the samurai and cannot dispel their fears of being displaced as the privileged class of Japanese society. Seizing the opportunity, Takauji decides to turn against the Emperor and establish a new shogunate.

== Cast ==
=== Ashikaga clan ===
- Hiroyuki Sanada as Ashikaga Takauji
- Yasuko Sawaguchi as Akahashi Tōko (Tōshi), Takauji's wife
- Ken Ogata as Ashikaga Sadauji, Takauji's father
- Shiho Fujimura as Uesugi Kiyoko, Takauji's mother
- Masanobu Takashima as Ashikaga Tadayoshi, Takauji's younger brother
- Kataoka Takatarō as Ashikaga Yoshiakira, Takauji's heir
  - Yūsuke Morita as Senjuō (young Yoshiakira)
- Michitaka Tsutsui as Ashikaga Tadafuyu, Takauji's illegitimate son
  - Yūichirō Yamazaki as Izayamaru (young Tadafuyu)
- Yasuo Daichi as Isshiki Umanosuke
- Akira Emoto as Kō no Moronao
- Kazunaga Tsuji as Kō no Moroshige
- Sansei Shiomi as Kō no Moroyasu
- Toru Abe as Kō no Morouji
- Kohji Moritsugu as Hosokawa Akiuji
- Akira Yamanouchi as Kira Sadayoshi
- Don Kantarō as Imagawa Norikuni

=== Hōjō clan (Kamakura shogunate) ===
- Tsurutaro Kataoka as Hōjō Takatoki, the 14th shikken
- Kiyoshi Kodama as Kanesawa (Hōjō) Sadaaki, the 15th shikken
- Hiroshi Katsuno as Akahashi (Hōjō) Moritoki, the last shikken and Takauji's brother-in-law.
- Frankie Sakai as Nagasaki Enki
- Tokuma Nishioka as Nagasaki Takasuke
- Tamaki Sawa as Kakukai-ni
- Akane Oda as Akiko
- Junkichi Orimoto as Shioya Muneharu
- Chikao Ohtsuka as Doisado no Zenshi
- Kunio Kaga as Adachi Moriyasu

=== The Imperial Court ===
- Kataoka Takao as Emperor Go-Daigo
- Daijirō Tsusumi as Prince Moriyoshi
- Mieko Harada as Ano Renshi
- Terutake Tsuji as Emperor Kōgon

=== Kugyō/Kuge ===
- Masaomi Kondō as Kitabatake Chikafusa
- Kumiko Goto as Kitabatake Akiie
- Takaaki Enoki as Hino Toshimoto
- Masahiro Motoki as Chigusa Tadaaki
- Hōsei Komatsu as Nawa Nagatoshi
- Hatsunori Hasegawa as Saionji Kinmune
- Takashi Fujiki as Bōmon Kiyotada
- Norihiro Inoue as Shijō Takasuke
- Mitsuru Miyamoto as Nijō Michihira
- Akaji Maro as Monkan
- Baku Ōwada as Madenokōji Fujifusa

=== Nitta clan ===
- Kenichi Hagiwara (episodes 1-7) → Jinpachi Nezu as Nitta Yoshisada
- Masumi Miyazaki as Kōtō no Naishi
- Yoshizumi Ishihara as Wakiya Yoshisuke

=== Kawachi Province ===
- Tetsuya Takeda as Kusunoki Masashige
- Mariko Fuji as Hisako
- Hidekazu Akai as Kusunoki Masasue
- Shigeyuki Nakamura as Kusunoki Masatsura
  - Seidai Katō as young Masatsura

=== Hanayasha Theatre Group ===
- Kanako Higuchi as Hanayasha/Utsugi, Kusunoki Masashige's younger sister
- Toshirō Yanagiba as Ishi
  - Ryō Takayama as young Ishi
- Rie Miyazawa as Fujiyasha, Izayamaru's mother
  - Chikako Oba as young Fujiyasha
- Hideki Nishioka as Kanze Kiyotsugu

=== Others ===
- Takanori Jinnai as Sasaki Dōyō
- Tetsu Watanabe as Akamatsu Enshin
- Etsushi Takahashi as Momonoi Tadatsune
- Etsushi Toyokawa
- Takako Tokiwa
- Strong Kobayashi as Big Man

== Production credit ==
- Sword fight arranger - Kunishirō Hayashi

== TV schedule ==
Episode	Original airdate	Title	Directed by	Rating
1	January 6, 1991	"Chichi to Ko" (父と子)	Mikio Satō	34.6%
2	January 13, 1991	"Mebae" (芽生え)	Mikio Satō	34.3%
3	January 20, 1991	"Fūunji" (風雲児)	Mikio Satō	33.0%
4	January 27, 1991	"Mikado Gomuhon" (帝 ご謀反)	Kenji Tanaka	31.0%
5	February 3, 1991	"Ayaushi Ashikaga-ke" (危うし足利家)	Kenji Tanaka	28.9%
6	February 10, 1991	"Kusunoki Tōjō" (楠木登場)	Mikio Satō	30.2%
7	February 17, 1991	"Hiren" (悲恋)	Takayasu Enokido / Mikio Satō	33.1%
8	February 24, 1991	"Yōrei-boshi" (妖霊星)	Mikio Satō	32.5%
9	March 3, 1991	"Shukumei no Ko" (宿命の子)	Kenji Tanaka	32.1%
10	March 10, 1991	"Mikado no Kyohei" (帝の挙兵)	Kenji Tanaka	30.5%
11	March 17, 1991	"Kusunoki Tatsu" (楠木立つ)	Takayasu Enokido	30.2%
12	March 24, 1991	"Kasagi Rakujō" (笠置落城)	Sōsei Mineshima	31.6%
13	March 31, 1991	"Kōbō Akasaka-jō" (攻防赤坂城)	Takayasu Enokido	25.5%
14	April 7, 1991	"Akigiri" (秋霧)	Mikio Satō	19.9%
15	April 14, 1991	"Takauji to Masashige" (高氏と正成)	Mikio Satō	25.0%
16	April 21, 1991	"Oki Hairu" (隠岐配流)	Kenji Tanaka	24.3%
17	April 28, 1991	"Ketsudan no Toki" (決断の時)	Takayasu Enokido	22.0%
18	May 5, 1991	"Mikado no Dasshutsu" (帝の脱出)	Takayasu Enokido	21.7%
19	May 12, 1991	"Hitojichi" (人質)	Mikio Satō	29.2%
20	May 19, 1991	"Ashikaga Kekki" (足利決起)	Mikio Satō	27.7%
21	May 26, 1991	"Kyoto Kōryaku" (京都攻略)	Takayasu Enokido	27.5%
22	June 2, 1991	"Kamakura Enjō" (鎌倉炎上)	Mikio Satō	27.5%
23	June 9, 1991	"Gaisen" (凱旋)	Sōsei Mineshima	24.6%
24	June 16, 1991	"Shinsei" (新政)	Takayasu Enokido	22.9%
25	June 23, 1991	"Ashikaga Takauji" (足利尊氏)	Jun Takebayashi	22.3%
26	June 30, 1991	"Onshō no Hamon" (恩賞の波紋)	Mikio Satō	24.8%
27	July 7, 1991	"Kuge ka Buke ka" (公家か武家か)	Takayasu Enokido	24.6%
28	July 14, 1991	"Kaisen Zen'ya" (開戦前夜)	Mikio Satō	22.9%
29	July 21, 1991	"Ōtō-no-miya Taiho" (大塔宮逮捕)	Sōsei Mineshima	22.2%
30	July 28, 1991	"Higeki no Ōji" (悲劇の皇子)	Kenji Tanaka	22.4%
31	August 4, 1991	"Takauji Somuku" (尊氏叛く)	Masami Kadowaki	21.8%
32	August 11, 1991	"Fujiyasha Shisu" (藤夜叉死す)	Takayasu Enokido	22.0%
33	August 18, 1991	"Senjuō to Izayamaru" (千寿王と不知哉丸)	Mikio Satō	21.5%
34	August 25, 1991	"Takauji Tsuitō" (尊氏追討)	Masami Kadowaki	24.7%
35	September 1, 1991	"Daigyakuten" (大逆転)	Takayasu Enokido	23.4%
36	September 8, 1991	"Minatogawa no Kessen" (湊川の決戦)	Kenji Tanaka	27.6%
37	September 15, 1991	"Masashige Jijin" (正成自刃)	Mikio Satō	24.6%
38	September 22, 1991	"Itten Ryōtei" (一天両帝)	Masami Kadowaki	25.7%
39	September 29, 1991	"Akiie Chiru" (顕家散る)	Mitsunobu Ozaki	26.2%
40	October 6, 1991	"Yoshisada no Saigo" (義貞の最期)	Kenji Tanaka	22.9%
41	October 13, 1991	"Mikado Hōgyo" (帝崩御)	Kenji Tanaka	19.9%
42	October 20, 1991	"Haha no Yuigon" (母の遺言)	Mitsunobu Ozaki	20.8%
43	October 27, 1991	"Ashikaga-ke no Naifun" (足利家の内紛)	Takayasu Enokido	25.3%
44	November 3, 1991	"Gekokujō" (下剋上)	Mikio Satō	22.0%
45	November 10, 1991	"Seihen" (政変)	Kenji Tanaka	24.2%
46	November 17, 1991	"Kyōdai no Kizuna" (兄弟の絆)	Takayasu Enokido	22.8%
47	November 24, 1991	"Shōgun no Haiboku" (将軍の敗北)	Jun Takebayashi	26.0%
48	December 1, 1991	"Hateshinaki Tatakai" (果てしなき戦い)	Kenji Tanaka	23.0%
49	December 8, 1991	"Takauji no Shi" (尊氏の死)	Mikio Satō	24.6%
Average rating 26.0% - Rating is based on Japanese Video Research (Kantō region).
