= Yoshitomo Tokugawa =

Japanese noble (1950–2017)

Yoshitomo Tokugawa (徳川 慶朝, Tokugawa Yoshitomo; February 1, 1950 – September 25, 2017) was the 4th-generation head of the Tokugawa Yoshinobu-ke, the branch of the Tokugawa line started by the last Shōgun Tokugawa Yoshinobu.

== Biography ==
Born in Sena, in Shizuoka Prefecture, he went to school in Tokyo, later engaging in a career in photography (incidentally, the hobby of his great-grandfather) and graphic design with Honda. Later a freelance author, he spent his time writing about the history of his family after the Meiji Restoration. He also sold coffee under the brand name Tokugawa Shōgun Kōhī.

Through his mother's side of the family, Yoshitomo is also a descendant of Matsudaira Katamori.

== Death ==
Yoshitomo died on September 25, 2017, in a hospital in Mito, Ibaraki Prefecture, at the age of 67.

== Principal works ==
- Tokugawa Yoshinobu-ke ni Youkoso. Tokyo: Bungei-shunju, 2003.
- Tokugawa Yoshinobu-ke no Shokutaku. Tokyo: Bungei-shunju, 2005.

== Ancestry ==
Ancestors of Yoshitomo Tokugawa

16. Tokugawa Nariaki
8. Tokugawa Yoshinobu
17. Princess Arisugawa Yoshiko
4. Yoshihisa Tokugawa
18. Matsudaira Masataka
9. Shinmura Nobu
2. Yoshimitsu Tokugawa
20. Prince Arisugawa Takahito
10. Prince Arisugawa Takehito
21. Mori Noriko
5. Princess Mieko Arisugawa
22. Maeda Yoshiyasu
11. Maeda Yasuko
1. Yoshitomo Tokugawa
24. Matsudaira Yoshitatsu
12. Matsudaira Katamori
25. Komori Chiyo
6. Morio Matsudaira
26. Tashiro Magahyōe
13. Tashiro Saku
3. Kazuko Matsudaira
28. Mizuno Tadaaki
14. Mizuno Tadanori
7. Shinko Mizuno
30. Matsudaira Masatomo
15. Matsudaira Eiko

=== Patrilineal descent ===
Patrilineal descent

Tokugawa's patriline is the line from which he is descended father to son.

The existence of a verifiable link between the Nitta clan and the Tokugawa/Matsudaira clan remains somewhat in dispute.

1. Descent prior to Keitai is unclear to modern historians, but traditionally traced back patrilineally to Emperor Jimmu
2. Emperor Keitai, ca. 450–534
3. Emperor Kinmei, 509–571
4. Emperor Bidatsu, 538–585
5. Prince Oshisaka, ca. 556–???
6. Emperor Jomei, 593–641
7. Emperor Tenji, 626–671
8. Prince Shiki, ????–716
9. Emperor Kōnin, 709–786
10. Emperor Kanmu, 737–806
11. Emperor Saga, 786–842
12. Emperor Ninmyō, 810–850
13. Emperor Montoku 826-858
14. Emperor Seiwa, 850-881
15. Prince Sadazumi, 873-916
16. Minamoto no Tsunemoto, 894-961
17. Minamoto no Mitsunaka, 912-997
18. Minamoto no Yorinobu, 968-1048
19. Minamoto no Yoriyoshi, 988-1075
20. Minamoto no Yoshiie, 1039-1106
21. Minamoto no Yoshikuni, 1091-1155
22. Minamoto no Yoshishige, 1114-1202
23. Nitta Yoshikane, 1139-1206
24. Nitta Yoshifusa, 1162-1195
25. Nitta Masayoshi, 1187-1257
26. Nitta Masauji, 1208-1271
27. Nitta Motouji, 1253-1324
28. Nitta Tomouji, 1274-1318
29. Nitta Yoshisada, 1301-1338
30. Nitta Yoshimune, 1331?-1368
31. Tokugawa Chikasue?, ????-???? (speculated)
32. Tokugawa Arichika, ????-????
33. Matsudaira Chikauji, d. 1393?
34. Matsudaira Yasuchika, ????-14??
35. Matsudaira Nobumitsu, c. 1404 – 1488/89?
36. Matsudaira Chikatada, 1430s-1501
37. Masudaira Nagachika, 1473-1544
38. Matsudaira Nobutada, 1490-1531
39. Matsudaira Kiyoyasu, 1511-1536
40. Matsudaira Hirotada, 1526-1549
41. Tokugawa Ieyasu, 1st Tokugawa Shōgun (1543-1616)
42. Tokugawa Yorifusa, 1st Lord of Mito (1603-1661)
43. Matsudaira Yorishige, 1st Lord of Takamatsu (1622-1695)
44. Matsudaira Yoriyuki (1661-1687)
45. Matsudaira Yoritoyo, 3rd Lord of Takamatsu (1680-1735)
46. Tokugawa Munetaka, 4th Lord of Mito (1705-1730)
47. Tokugawa Munemoto, 5th Lord of Mito (1728-1766)
48. Tokugawa Harumori, 6th Lord of Mito (1751-1805)
49. Tokugawa Harutoshi, 7th Lord of Mito (1773-1816)
50. Tokugawa Nariaki, 9th Lord of Mito (1800-1860)
51. Tokugawa Yoshinobu, 15th Tokugawa Shōgun (1837-1913)
52. Yoshihisa Tokugawa (1884-1922)
53. Yoshimitsu Tokugawa (1913-1993)
54. Yoshitomo Tokugawa (1950-2017)
