= Nitta Shōen =

Landed estate

Nitta shōen
- 新田荘遺 (Japanese)
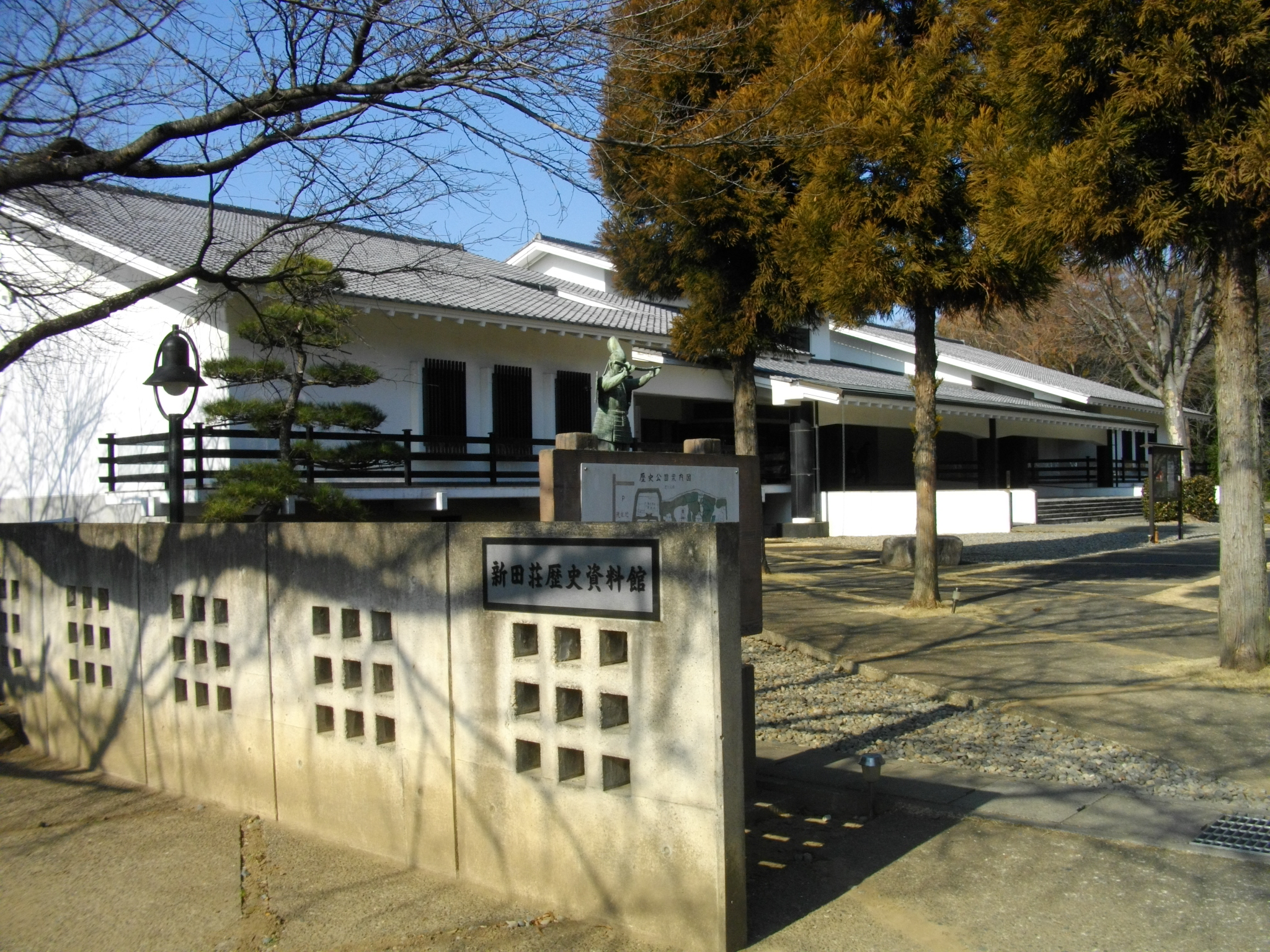
- Nitta-no-shō Museum of History

- Nitta-no-shō Nitta Shōen (Japan)
- 36°17′50″N 139°20′01″E
- Periods: Heian period
- Location: Ōta Japan
- Region: Kantō region

Site notes
- Public access: Yes

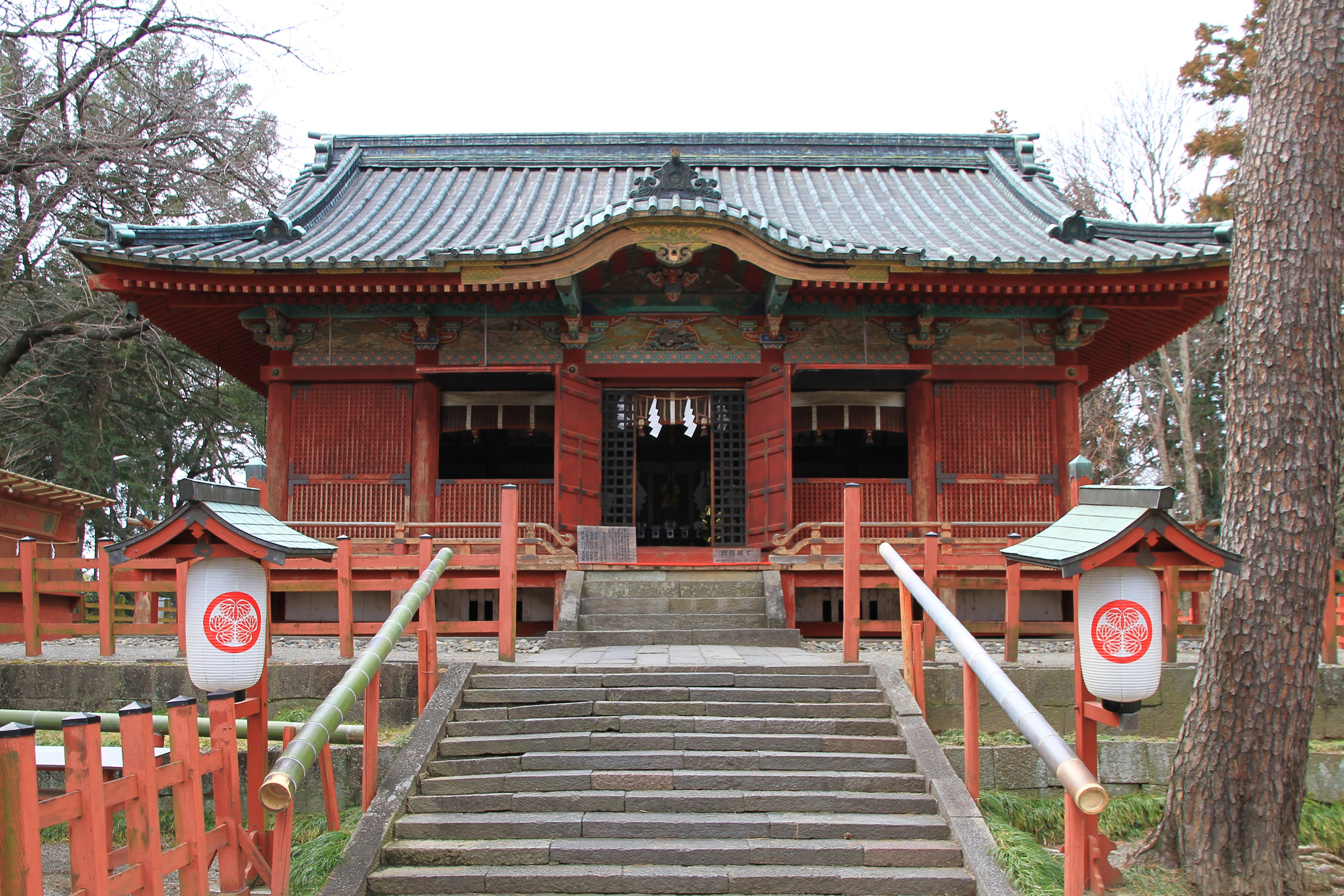
Sarada Tōshō-gū

The Nitta shōen (新田荘遺), also known as Nitta-no-shō, was a vast shōen, or landed estate dating the from Heian period which existed in Kōzuke Province (present-day Gunma Prefecture) from the late Heian period into the Muromachi period. It was the home territory of the Nitta clan, which played an important role in the Kemmu restoration which overthrew the Kamakura shogunate and subsequent wars of the Nanboku-chō period. In the year 2000, eleven sites connected with the Nitta-no-shō within the city of Ōta, Gunma were collectively designated a National Historic Site of Japan.

== Overview ==
In 1108 AD, Minamoto no Yoshikuni obtained rights to a large territory in Kōzuke Province which had been devastated by the eruption of Mount Asama. This territory was on the left bank of the Tone River and extended for the entirety of ancient Nitta County, and much of Sai County, Sari County, and a portion of Hanzawa County in Musashi Province. In modern terms, this corresponds to all of the area of the cities of Ōta, Isesaki and Midori. Yoshikuni had already laid claim to a similar vast estate, Ashikaga-shō in Shimotsuke Province in 1142. In 1157, Yoshikuni, together with this son Minamoto no Yoshishige nominally donated this estate to the Buddhist temple of Kongoshin-in which had been established by Emperor Toba and to the court noble Fujiwara no Tadamasa, and accepted the title of "steward". This had the effect of converting the estate into an autonomous tax-free shōen completely independent of outside control. Yoshishige's armed retainers continually expanded the borders of his estate at the expense of his weaker neighbors, and his descendants took the surname of "Nitta" after the name of the manor.

Despite the death of Nitta Yoshisada in the early Muromachi period and the rise of the Ashikaga shogunate, a branch of the Nitta clan continued to rule parts of the territory under the surname of "Iwamatsu" until they sided against Toyotomi Hideyoshi at the Siege of Odawara in 1590.

The eleven sites covered under the National Historic Site designation are:

1. Enfuku-ji temple precincts
2. Junisho Jinja precincts
3. Sōji-ji temple precincts
4. Chōraku-ji temple precincts
5. Serada Tōshō-gū
6. Meiō-in temple precincts
7. Ikushina Jinja
8. Sorimach Yakushi temple precincts
9. Eda residence ruins
10. Shigeno water source
11. Yatagami water source

== See also ==
- List of Historic Sites of Japan (Gunma)
