= Fujishima Shrine =

Shinto shrine in Fukui, Japan

Fujishima Shrine 藤島神社
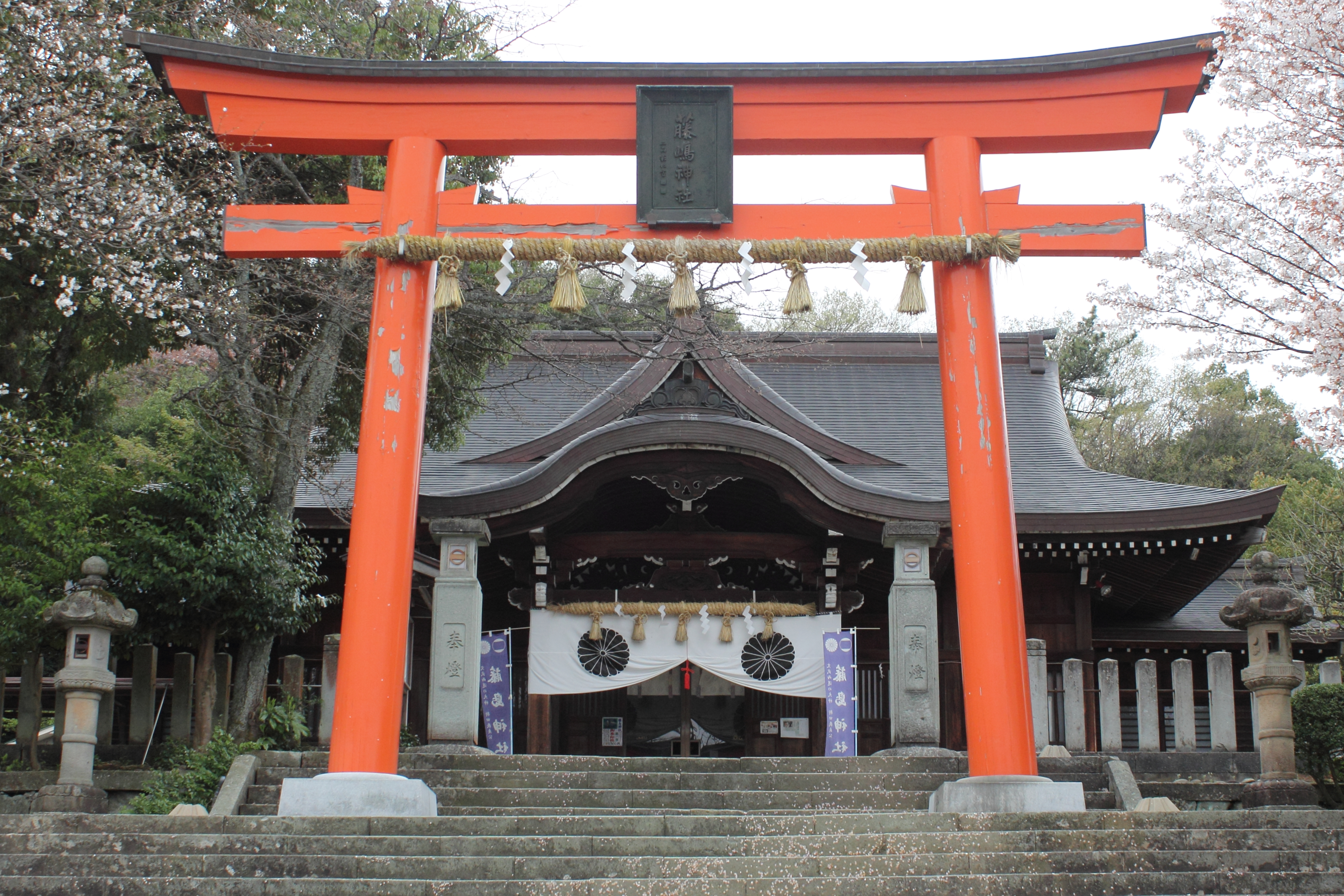
- Fujishima-jinja

- Location within Fukui Prefecture Location within Japan

Religion
- Affiliation: Shinto
- Deity: Nitta Yoshisada

Location
- Location: 3-8-21 Moya, Fukui-shi, Fukui-ken 918-8003 Japan
- Interactive map of Fujishima Shrine 藤島神社
- Coordinates: 36.0564°N 136.2110°E

Architecture
- Style: Nagare-zukuri
- Founder: Matsudaira Mochiaki
- Established: 1870

Website
- fujishima-jinja.jp

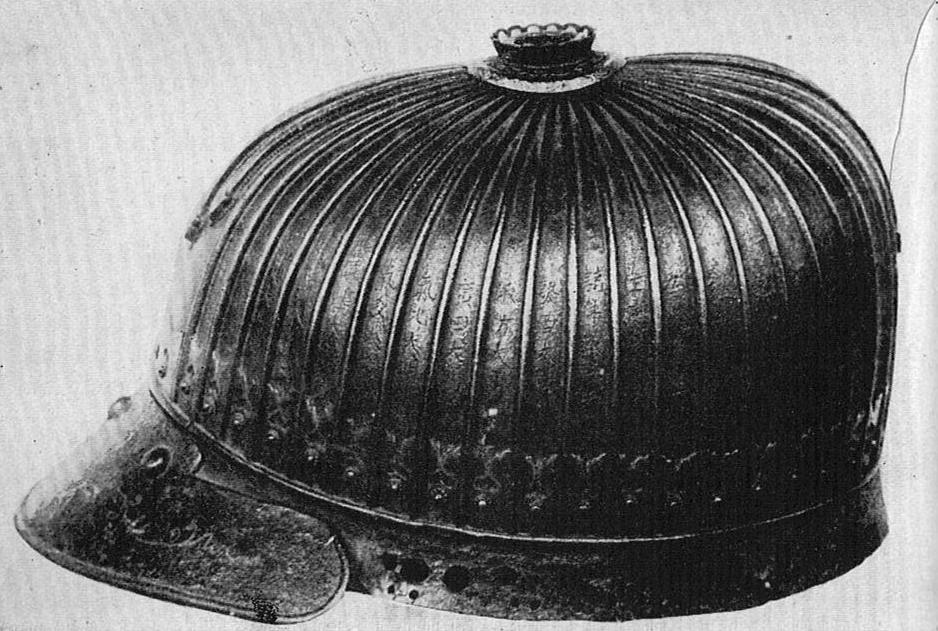
Kabuto of Nitta Yoshisada

Fujishima Shrine (藤島神社, Fujishima-jinja) is a Shinto shrine located in the city of Fukui, Japan. In the former Modern system of ranked Shinto Shrines, it was a special shrine (別格官幣社, Bekkaku Kanpei-sha). Its main festival is held annually on August 25.

Nitta Yoshisada (新田 義貞; 1301 – August 17, 1338) was the head of the Nitta clan in the early fourteenth century, and supported the Southern Court of Emperor Go-Daigo in the Nanboku-chō period. He fought against the partisans of the Northern pretender led by Ashikaga Takauji brothers in a see-saw campaign which saw the capital change hands several times. However, during the Battle of Kuromaru in 1338 he was killed in combat.

In 1660, a farmer tilling the land near the site of the battle uncovered a kabuto helmet and presented it to Matsudaira Mitsumichi, daimyō of Fukui Domain. The construction of the helmet indicated that it had belonged to a high-ranking warrior, and the domain's chief military strategist, Inoue Banzaemon declared that it must have belonged to Nitta Yoshisada. A mound, the "Nitta-zuka", was built on the site where the farmer found the helmet as a memorial. In 1870, the imperial governor of Fukui, Matsudaira Mochiaki, built a Shinto shrine on top of the Nitta-zuka. This shrine was named "Fujishima Jinja" in 1876 and was given a formal ranking in the State Shinto system. However, the shrine was relocated in 1881, and rebuilt again in 1905, so that its present location is some three kilometers from the original Nitta-zuka.

It is one of the Fifteen Shrines of the Kenmu Restoration, built by the Meiji government to commemorate the events of the Nanboku-chō period and to promote loyalty to the Imperial family of Japan.

The kabuto is preserved at the shrine, and is an Important Cultural Property.

== See also ==
- Fifteen Shrines of the Kenmu Restoration
