= Serada Tōshō-gū =

Shrine

- 世良田東照宮
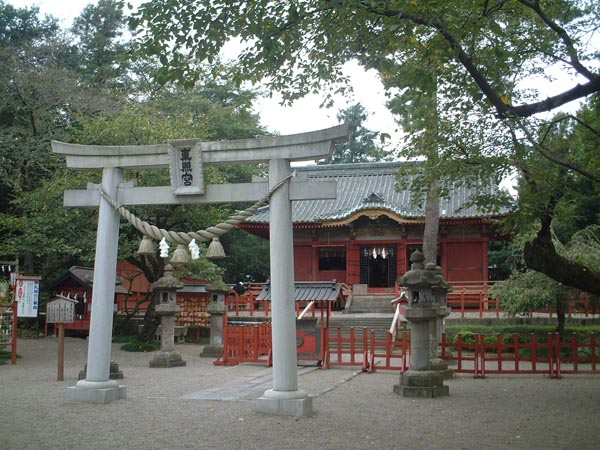
- Serada Tōshō-gū

- Serada Tōshō-gū Serada Tōshō-gū (Japan)

Religion
- Affiliation: Shinto
- Deity: Tokugawa Ieyasu
- Festival: April 17
- Type: Tōshō-gū

Location
- Location: Ōta, Gunma, Japan
- Interactive map of Serada Tōshō-gū
- Coordinates: 36°15′43″N 139°16′31″E

Architecture
- Founder: Tokugawa Iemitsu
- Established: 1644

Website
- Official website

The Serada Tōshō-gū (世良田東照宮) is a Shinto shrine located in the city of Ōta Gunma Prefecture, Japan. It enshrines the deified first Shōgun of the Tokugawa shogunate, Tokugawa Ieyasu. In the year 2000, it was one of the eleven sites connected with the Nitta-no-shō which were collectively designated a National Historic Site of Japan.

== History ==
The Serada Tōshō-gū was established by Shōgun Tokugawa Iemitsu in 1644 on a site adjacent to the Buddhist temple of Chōraku-ji (長楽寺). This temple has a memorial stupa to Nitta Yoshishige and his descendant Serada Yoshiki. The Tokugawa clan claimed descent from the Nitta clan via the Serada cadet branch, and thus the temple was regarded as a clan bodaiji by the Tokugawa clan. After the deification of Tokugawa Ieyasu as the kami Tōshō-daigongen, the priest Tenkai encouraged the building a network of shrines subsidiary to the Nikkō Tōshō-gū at various locations around the country connected with Tokugawa Ieyasu and the Tokugawa clan in general. The shrine prospered during the Edo period, and was separated from Chōraku-ji after the Meiji restoration with the Shinbutsu bunri decrees of the new Meiji government. In 1879, under State Shinto's Modern system of ranked Shinto shrines, it was ranked as a village shrine.

== Cultural properties ==
- The main shrine building (Honden), Worship Hall (Heiden) and Karamon gate were all former structures of the Oku-no-in of the Nikkō Tōshō-gū that were relocated to this site when the buildings erected by Tokugawa Hidetada were rebuilt by Tokugawa Iemitsu in 1644. The Honden is a one-bay Nagare-zukuri style structure with a copper roof. The Heiden is likewise an early Edo period (1615–1624) structure. It is a 3 × 5 bay Irimoya-zukuri style building with a copper roof. All three buildings were designated an National Important Cultural Property in 1956.
- The shrine also has a tachi Japanese sword. Forged at the end of the Kamakura period to early Nanboku-chō period, it was a donation to the Oku-no-in of the Nikkō Tōshō-gū by Emperor Go-Mizunoo, and accompanied the buildings of that shrine to the present location. The sword has a total length of only 72.5 cm, but the metal fittings are silver-polished, and the scabbard is a leather base with gold lacquer and chrysanthemum crest lacquer work. It was designated an Important Cultural Property in 1921.

== See also ==
- Tōshō-gū
- List of Tōshō-gū
