= Sieges of Kuromaru =

Japanese fortress in Echizen Province

Coordinates: 36°5′17.84″N 136°12′33.43″E

Battle of Fujishima
- Part of the Nanboku-chō Wars
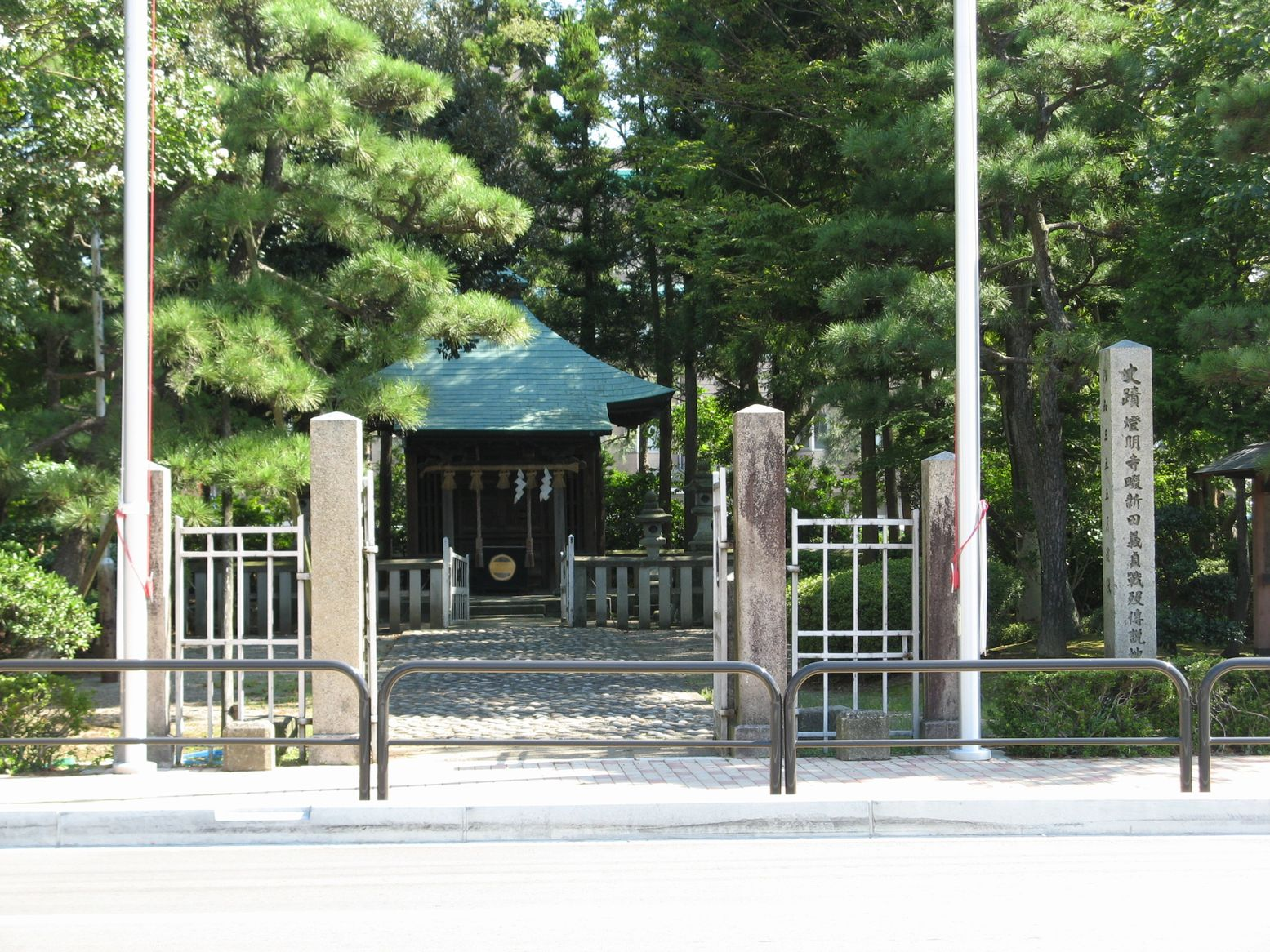
- Fujishima Shrine monument to where Nitta Yoshisada's helmet was found
Date	August 1338
Location	Near Kuromaru fortress, Echizen Province, Japan
Result	Northern Court victory

Belligerents
Northern Court	Southern Court

Commanders and leaders
Hosokawa Akiuji	Nitta Yoshisada †

Strength
Unknown	50 horse
- Location within Fukui Prefecture Sieges of Kuromaru (Japan)

Siege of Kuromaru
Date	Autumn 1339
Location	Kuromaru fortress, Echizen Province
Result	Siege succeeds; fortress falls to Southern Court

Belligerents
Northern Court	Southern Court

Commanders and leaders
Shiba Takatsune	Wakiya Yoshisuke

The Kuromaru (黒丸), or "Black Fortress", was a fortress of the Kanrei Shiba Takatsune located in Echizen Province (present-day Nittazuka, Fukui, Fukui Prefecture) in the Hokuriku region of Japan. It was attacked twice during the Nanboku-chō Wars of the 14th century, during which it was likely both built and destroyed.

The fortress was first attacked in August 1338 by a small force under Nitta Yoshisada, numbering roughly fifty horse, in what would come to be known as the Battle of Fujishima. Hosokawa Akiuji had been ordered by Ashikaga Takauji to aid Shiba Takatsune in the defense, and encountered Nitta's force a short distance from the fortress.

The warrior monks of the Heisen-ji monastery, originally part of Nitta's force, were bribed by Shiba to abandon the attack, and Nitta's rush to fill the ensuing gap in his formations led to him and his horsemen running into Hosokawa's. In the battle which followed, Nitta was mortally wounded by an arrow.

The following year, upon his enthronement, Emperor Go-Murakami ordered the late Nitta Yoshisada's brother, Wakiya Yoshisuke, to lead another attack on the fortress. This assault was successful, and ended in Shiba's surrender.

== Taiheiki ==
Chapter 20 of the Taiheiki chronicles the events of the death of Nitta Yoshisada at Kuromaru. It states that an arrow wounded his horse, making it unable to jump over a ditch. It fell and trapped Yoshisada's left leg. An arrow in the flurry struck him between the brows, and he drew his sword and slit his throat. The resemblance to the death of Minamoto no Yoshinaka as described in the Heike Monogatari has led to questions about whether the account is factual.

== Helmet of Yoshisada ==
In 1660, a farmer tilling the land near the site of the battle uncovered a kabuto helmet and presented it to Matsudaira Mitsumichi, daimyō of Fukui Domain. The construction of the helmet indicated that it had belonged to a high-ranking warrior, and the domain's chief military strategist, Inoue Banzaemon declared that it must have belonged to Nitta Yoshisada. In 1870, the imperial governor of Fukui, Matsudaira Mochiaki, built a Shinto shrine, the Fujishima Shrine on the site, as part of the Meiji government's drive to honour the history of the Kenmu Restoration and to promote loyalty to the Imperial family of Japan. The kabuto is preserved at the shrine, and is an Important Cultural Property. The site of the battle itself was protected as a National Historic Site since1924.
