= Yoshitomo =

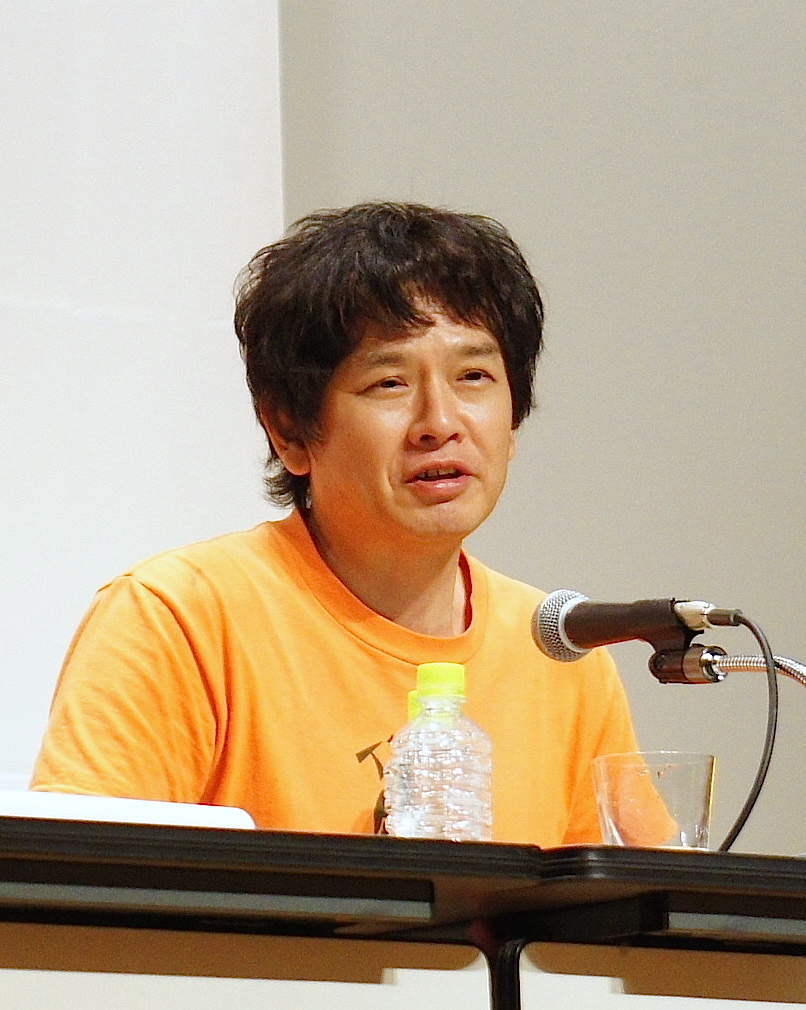
- Yoshitomo Nara, Japanese artist
- Gender: Male

Origin
- Origin: Japanese
- Meaning: Different meanings depending on the kanji used

Other names
- Alternative spelling: Yositomo (Kunrei-shiki) Yositomo (Nihon-shiki) Yoshitomo (Hepburn)

Yoshitomo is a masculine Japanese given name.

== Written forms ==
Yoshitomo can be written using many different combinations of kanji characters. Here are some examples:

- 義友, "justice, friend"
- 義朋, "justice, friend"
- 義智 / 義知, "justice, intellect"
- 義朝, "justice, morning"
- 吉友, "good luck, friend"
- 吉朋, "good luck, friend"
- 吉智 / 吉知, "good luck, intellect"
- 吉朝, "good luck, morning"
- 善友, "justice, friend"
- 善朋, "justice, friend"
- 善智 / 善知, "justice, intellect"
- 善朝, "justice, morning"
- 芳友, "fragrant/virtuous, friend"
- 芳朋, "fragrant/virtuous, friend"
- 芳智 / 芳知, "fragrant/virtuous, intellect"
- 芳朝, "fragrant/virtuous, morning"
- 好友, "good/like something, friend"
- 慶友, "congratulate, friend"
- 慶智 / 慶知, "congratulate, intellect"
- 慶朝, "congratulate, morning"
- 由智 / 由知, "reason, intellect"
- 由朝, "reason, morning"
- 良智 / 良知, "good, intellect"

The name can also be written in hiragana よしとも or katakana ヨシトモ.

== Notable people with the name ==
- Yoshitomo Minamoto (源 義朝; 1123–1160), Japanese samurai
- Yoshitomo Nara (奈良 美智; born 1959), Japanese artist
- Yoshitomo Tani (谷 佳知; born 1973), Japanese baseball player
- Yoshitomo Tsutsugoh (筒香 嘉智; born 1991), Japanese baseball player
- Yoshitomo Tokugawa (徳川 慶朝; born 1950), Japanese writer
- Yoshitomo Yonetani (米谷 良知; born 1963), Japanese anime director

== See also ==
- 3733 Yoshitomo, a main-belt asteroid
