= Nitta Shrine (Ōta) =

Shinto shrine in Ōta, Tokyo, Japan

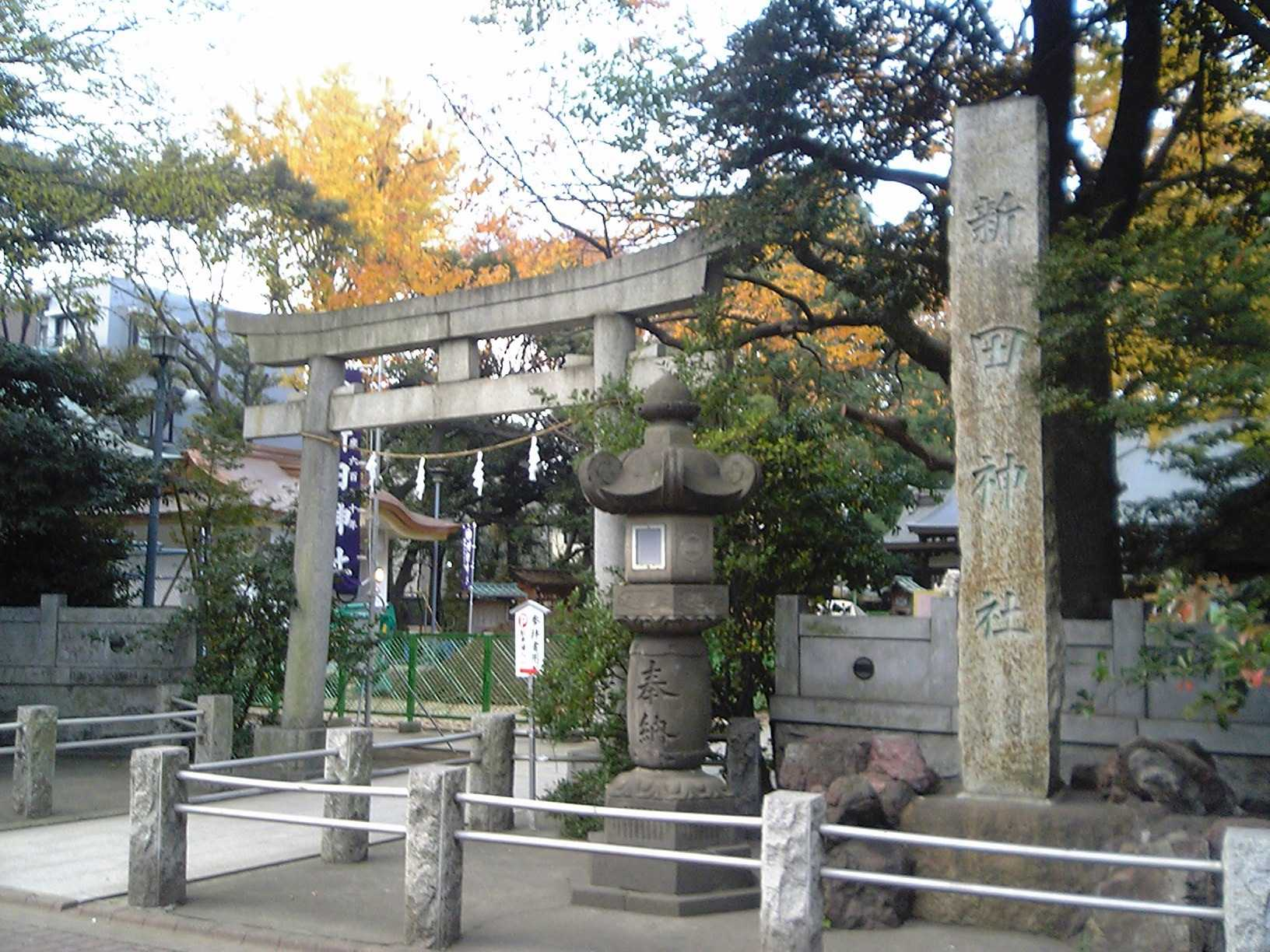

Religion
- Affiliation: Shinto
- Deity: Nitta Yoshioki
- Year consecrated: 1358

Location
- Location: Ōta, Tokyo, Japan
- Interactive map of Nitta Shrine

Architecture
- Style: Shinto shrine style

Nitta Shrine (新田神社) is a Shinto shrine located in Ōta, Tokyo, Japan. The shrine is dedicated to the memory of the 14th-century samurai, Nitta Yoshioki. He was enshrined there because his death was believed to have been caused by treachery, and those responsible were believed to have suffered a cursed fate. The shrine was built to calm his spirit. In addition to its historical and spiritual significance, the shrine has become a popular destination for worshippers seeking love.

== History ==
Constructed in 1358, Nitta Shrine is a place of worship for a deity that is believed to bring family prosperity, requited love, and the fulfillment of wishes, with the maintenance of good fortune and the invitation of happiness. Upon entering the shrine grounds, which are surrounded by lush greenery, visitors will first encounter a sacred tree before proceeding to the main building at the rear. This shrine is also renowned as the birthplace of hamaya, an arrow used for warding off evil spirits. During a visit to Nitta Shrine, Hiraga Gennai, a pharmacist from the Edo period who was also a student of Rangaku, a body of knowledge that was developed through Japan's limited association with Dutch culture and knowledge, created "yamori", an arrow made from the mysterious bamboo grown within the shrine's precincts, and recommended that people deify and believe in it. This is the origin of the current hamaya, which is believed to bring good luck and ward off evil spirits.

Nowadays, the Nitta Shrine is a revered and popular destination for those seeking good luck, and it commemorated its 650th anniversary in 2008. The shrine's reputation as a place of good fortune has made it a significant cultural and spiritual landmark in Japan. In the shrine's premises, there stands a 700-year-old shinboku sacred tree that has survived through numerous events. Despite being struck by thunder in the Edo period, the tree remained standing, and during the Tokyo air raid, the entire area around Nitta Shrine was burned down, leaving only the Zelkova tree intact.

== Belief ==
During the Nanboku-cho period, a famous samurai named Nitta Yoshioki, the second son of Nitta Yoshisada, fought for the Imperial Southern Court in Japan's North-South divide. Yoshioki was known for his bravery and strategic wisdom, and his death in a cowardly attack at the Yaguchi Ferry marked the end of his legacy. The samurai warriors who were responsible for Yoshioki's death were believed to have been cursed by his vengeful spirit, which caused them to experience terrifying ghostly phenomena that included lightning strikes and fire balls. To appease Yoshioki's spirit, local villagers constructed a shrine at the site of his death, based on the Japanese belief of "Goryo Shinko", which involved enshrining the spirits of deceased individuals who could protect people from harm. This belief was widely held across Japan and helped to mitigate the fear of natural disasters and plagues that were often attributed to evil spirits.

== See also ==
- Nitta Shrine
