= Siege of Kanegasaki =

Siege of Kanegasaki may refer to:

- Siege of Kanegasaki (1337)
- Siege of Kanegasaki (1570)
