= Nitta Yoshioki =

Japanese samurai

Nitta Yoshioki 新田義興
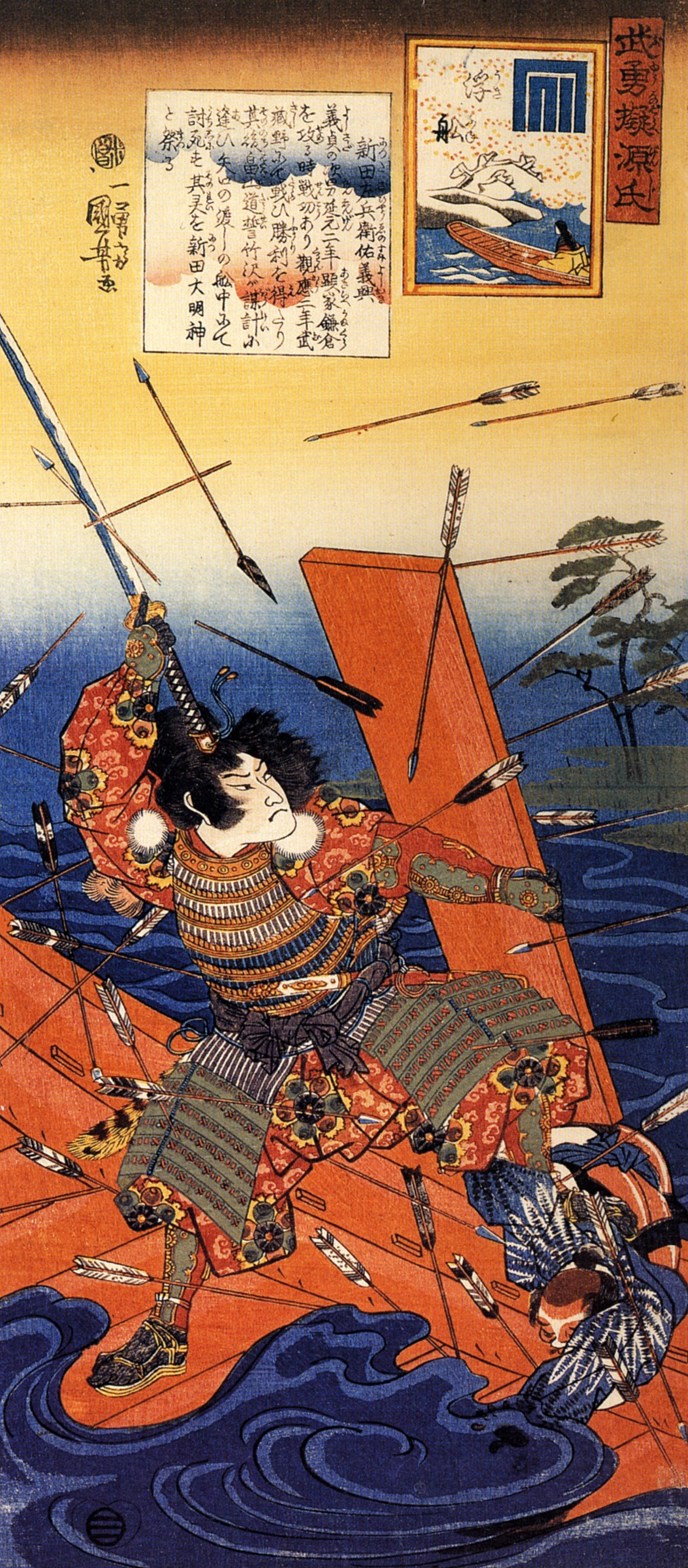
- The Death of Nitta Yoshioki at the Yaguchi Ferry, an ukiyo-e print by Utagawa Kuniyoshi (1797 – 1862)
- Born: 1331
- Died: 1358 (aged 26–27); Ōta, Tokyo
- Occupation: Samurai

Nitta Yoshioki (新田義興) (died 1358) was a samurai of the Nitta family who fought for the Southern Imperial Court in the Nanboku-chō period (1336–1392) of Japanese history.

Yoshioki was the second son of Nitta Yoshisada (1301–1338), who supported the Southern Court of Emperor Go-Daigo and Kamakura from the Hōjō clan in 1333. Yoshioki aided his father in the siege of Kamakura in 1333, and battled alongside Kitabatake Akiie. The following year, he fought alongside Kitabatake Akinobu, fortified Mt. Otoko, but was soon routed and forced to seek refuge at Mt. Yoshino.

The conflict with the Ashikaga clan continued for several decades, and in 1352, Yoshioki ousted Ashikaga Motouji from Kamakura, with the aid of his brother Nitta Yoshimune and cousin Wakiya Yoshiharu. Soon after taking control of the city, however, he was forced out by Ashikaga Takauji. Returning to the countryside of Kozuke and Musashi provinces, Yoshioki continued to fight for some time before being captured by Takezawa Nagahira. He was sentenced to death by the minister of Motouji, Hatakeyama Kunikiyo, and was executed at the age of 28 by drowning in the Tama River at Yaguchi in present-day Ōta ward of Tokyo.

A shrine at Yaguchi no Watashi, the Nitta Shrine, is dedicated to Yoshioki. He is revered under the name Nitta Daimyōjin (新田大明神). Musashi-Nitta Station on the Tōkyū Tamagawa Line in Tokyo takes its name from the Nitta Shrine. Yoshioki is the subject of an Edo-period kabuki play by Hiraga Gennai (1728–1780) titled Shinrei Yaguchi no Watashi.
