= Hōjō Sadayuki =

Japanese samurai (1302–1333)

Hōjō Sadayuki 北条貞将
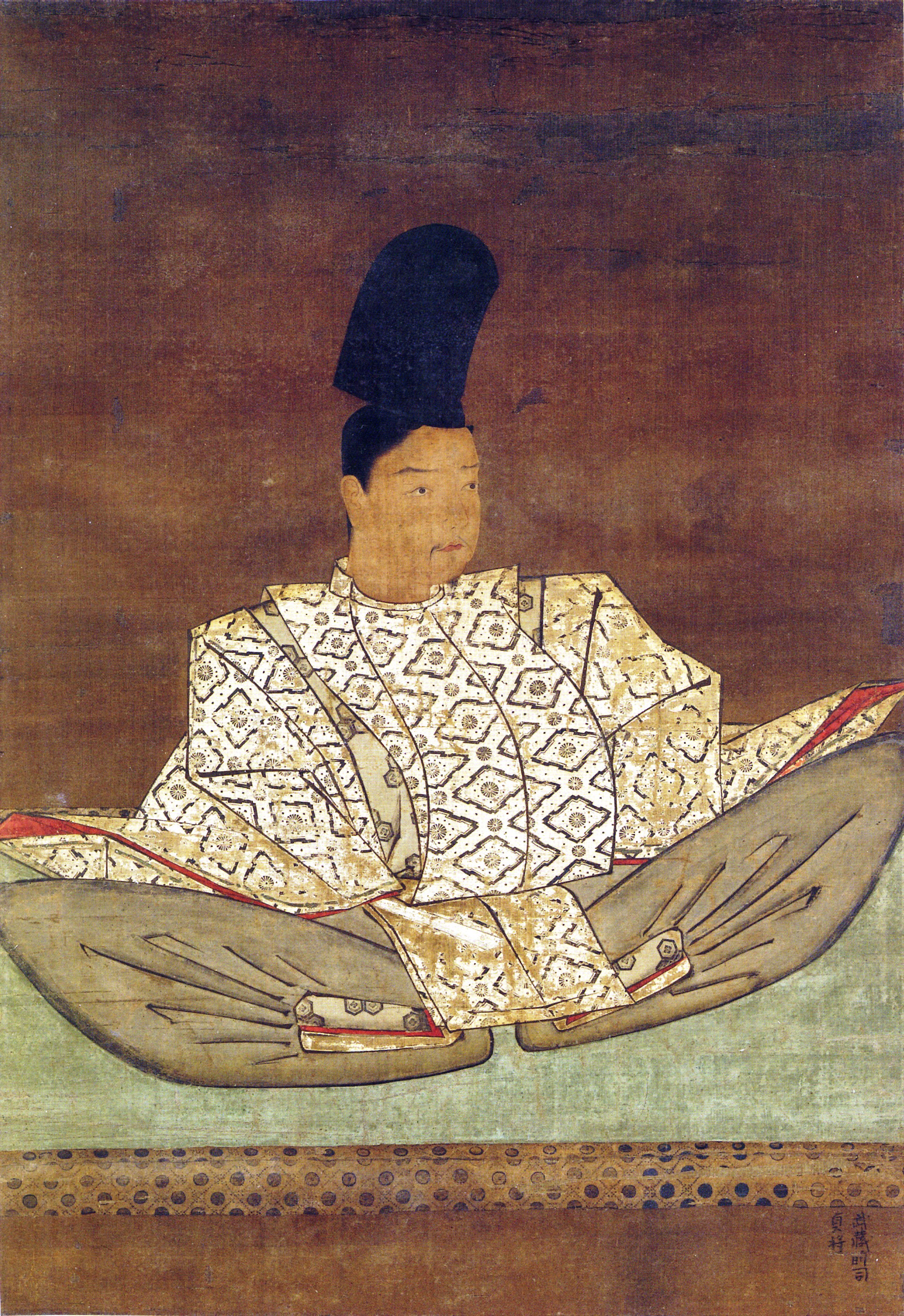
- Portrait of Hōjō Sadayuki
- Born: 1302
- Died: July 4, 1333 (aged 30–31)
- Other names: Kanazawa Sadayuki
- Occupation: samurai lord
- Children: Tadatoki, Atsutoki
- Father: Hōjō Sadaaki

Signature
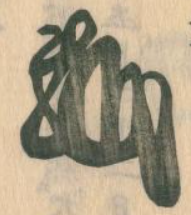

Hōjō Sadayuki (北条 貞将, 1302 – July 4, 1333) was a Japanese samurai lord of the late Kamakura period. He was the son and heir apparent of Hōjō Sadaaki, the 15th Shikken of the Kamakura Shogunate. There is a theory that he was the 17th Shikken of the shogunate. He was defeated and killed during the Siege of Kamakura in 1333.

== Life ==
Sadayuki was born in 1302, the eldest son of Hōjō Sadaaki, the 15th Shikken of the Kamakura Shogunate.

In 1318, Sadayuki became a member of the Council of State (hyōjōshū), and served as hikitsuke goban tōnin. At this time, he also married an unidentified woman. He held the court rank of Junior Fifth Rank, Lower Grade and was Provisional Captain of the Right Division of Bureau of Horses (uma no gon no kami).

In 1324, when the Shōchū Rebellion broke out, Sadayuki became Rokuhara Tandai Minamikata and entered Kyoto with 5,000 cavalrymen. After this, he investigated the situation in Kyoto as the Shikken Tandai. After just three days from his arrival, he was already putting out a fire that began at Rokujō Bōmon Inokuma.

In 1329, Sadayuki was promoted from Governor of Echigo Province to Governor of Musashi Province. The same year, his father Sadaaki began making arrangements for his son, and Sadayuki resigned from the post of tandai and left Kyoto in 1330. Upon his arrival in Kamakura, he was appointed hikitsuke ichiban tōnin.

Sadayuki fought Nitta Yoshisada during the Siege of Kamakura. In 1333, when Yoshisada conducted a rise to arms at Ikushina Shrine in Nitta Manor, Kōzuke Province in response to the escape of Emperor Go-Daigo, Sadayuki travelled to Shimokōbe Manor in Shimōsa Province as the shogunal army general. Although he organized his forces at Mutsu'ura Manor, he was defeated at Tsurumi River by Yoshisada's forces led by his cousin Chiba Sadatane and Oyama Hidetomo, and was forced to retreat to Kamakura.

According to Taiheiki, Sadayuki's military had declined to 800 men due to continuous warfare, and because Sadayuki himself was wounded in seven places, he retreated to Tōshō-ji, the family temple of the Hōjō clan, and said his last goodbye to Tokusō Hōjō Takatoki. It is said that at this time, Takatoki rewarded Sadayuki for his loyalty and he was given the posts of "both tandai" and Governor of Sagami Province. Before Sadayuki returned to the battlefield, he wrote: "It will be a memory that takes to the underworld." On July 4, 1333, he attacked Yoshisada's forces and was killed along with his son Tadatoki and many members of the Kanazawa Hōjō family.

Sadayuki's death has been described heroically in Taiheiki. According to the description, he wrote "I give away a life of a hundred years and the nation repays a favor of one day" on the back of his migyosho book with large characters, set it up in his armor, charged into a large enemy army and died. It is said that both the enemies and the allies were deeply impressed by it.

== 17th Shikken ==
According to Taiheiki, Hōjō Takatoki rewarded Sadayuki by appointing him to the posts of "both tandai" and Governor of Sagami Province. However, Sadayuki was hikitsuke ichiban tōnin at the time, and he had previously served as Rokuhara Tandai; this "reward" was equivalent to a demotion, and the only possible promotion could have been to the post of Shikken. Therefore, "both tandai" in Taiheiki may not refer to Rokuhara Tandai, but refers to Shikken and Rensho. Because the post of Shikken was vacant due to the death of Hōjō Moritoki, and because most shikken were appointed to Governor of Sagami Province after having previously served as Governor of Musashi Province, it has been theorized that Sadayuki had been the 17th Shikken.
