= Hōjō Akitoki =

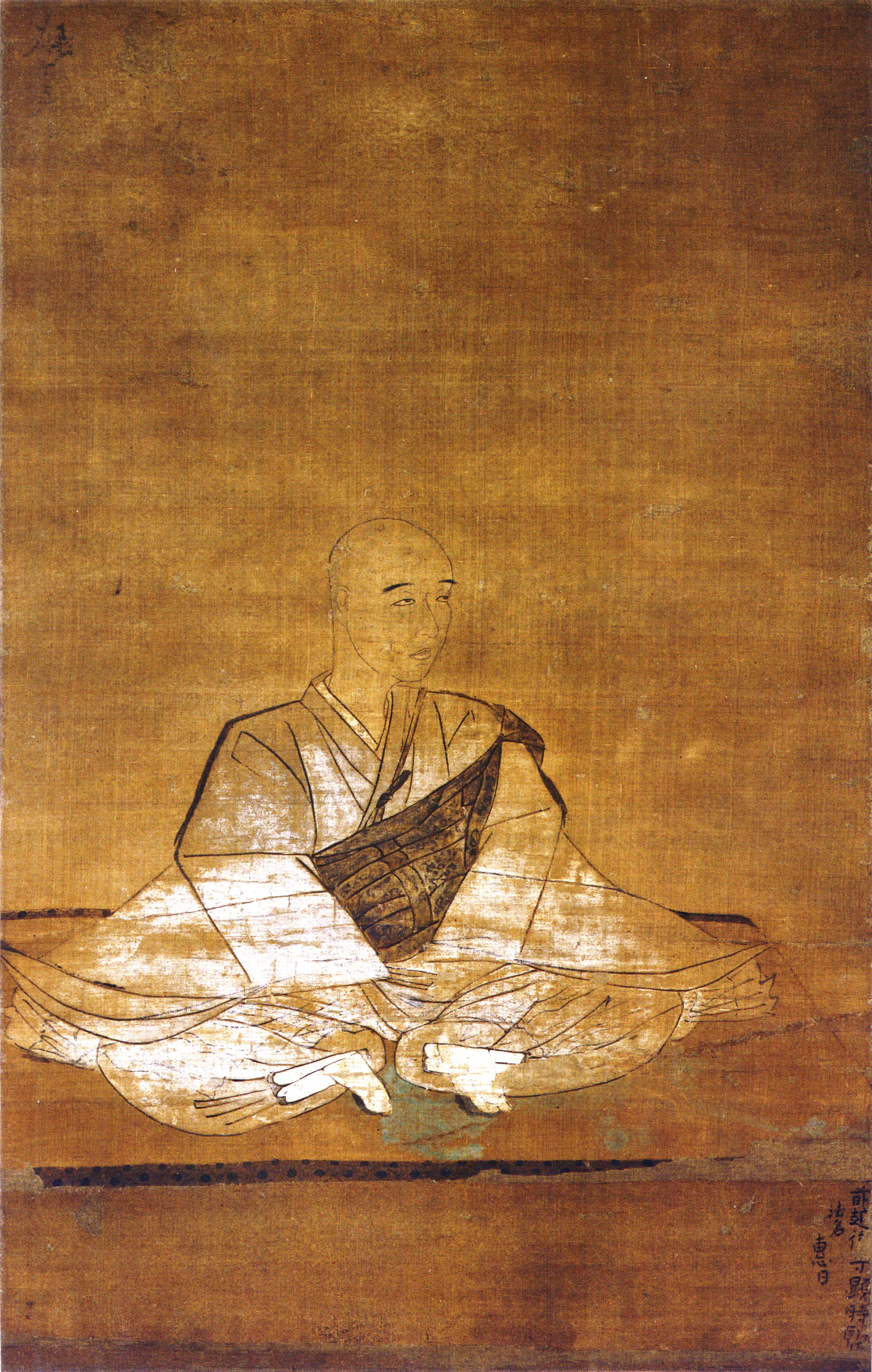
Pigment-on-silk portrait Hōjō Akitoki by an anonymous artist, held at Shōmyō-ji Temple in Kanagawa—a National Treasure of Japan

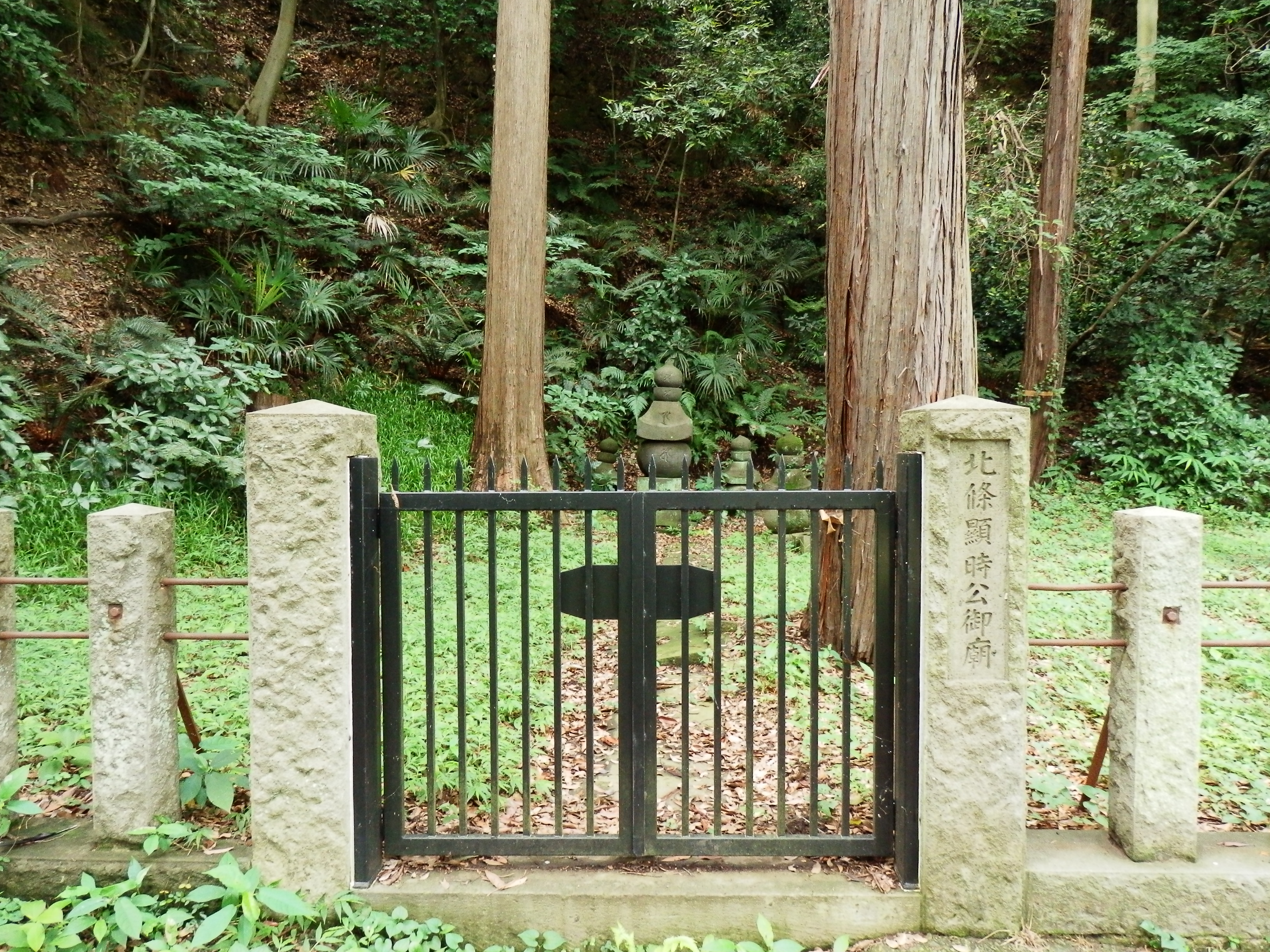
Tomb of Hōjō Akitoki

Hōjō Akitoki (北条顕時; 1248 – 7 May 1301) was a Japanese military leader during the Kamakura period (1185–1333). He was the third head of the Kanesawa-ryū of the Hōjō clan.

Akitoki was the son of Kanezawa Sanetoki and a daughter of Hōjō Masamura. In 1257 Akitoki had his genpuku coming-of-age ceremony under the tokusō Hōjō Tokiyori and took the name Tokikata (時方). In 1260 he became a guard of the shōgun; he attended Prince Munetaka and studied poetry and other subjects. He may have married Mugai Nyodai, but that is disputed, with some believing she was married to Hōjō Sanetoki.

Akitoki died 7 May 1301 and was succeeded by his son Hōjō Sadaaki. Akitoki's grave is in Shōmyō-ji in Kanagawa. He is said to have had a love of learning, like his father, and to have contributed to the establishment of the Kanazawa Bunko.
