= Hōjō Koresada =

Hōjō Koresada (北条 維貞; 1285 or 1286 - September 22, 1327)

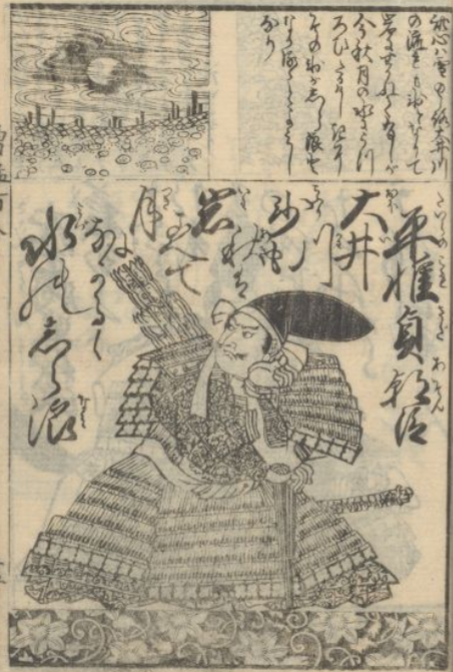

was a rensho of the Kamakura shogunate from 1326 to 1327.In 1326, GoDaigo ignored the Hojo compromise by appointing his son as the next in line of succession, instead of agreeing to the transfer of power to the elder line.

Preceded by Hōjō Sadaaki	Rensho; 1326-1327	Succeeded by Hōjō Shigetoki
Preceded by Hōjō Tokiatsu	Rokuhara Tandai (Minamikata); 1315–1324	Succeeded by Hōjō Sadayuki
