= Rokuhara Tandai =

Security chief title in Kamakura Japan (1221–1333)

Rokuhara Tandai (六波羅探題) was the post of the chiefs of the Kamakura shogunate in imperial capital Kyoto whose agency, the Rokuhara (六波羅), kept responsibility for security in Kinai and judicial affairs on western Japan, and negotiated with the imperial court. Despite keeping security, the Rokuhara were also a sort of secret police and widely feared.

Rokuhara Tandai was set up after the Jōkyū Incident in 1221. The two chiefs were called Kitakata (北方) and Minamikata (南方), respectively. Kitakata was higher-ranking than Minamikata. Like shikken and rensho, both posts were monopolized by the powerful Hōjō clan. The agency was destroyed with the fall of Kamakura shogunate in 1333.

== List of Rokuhara Tandai ==
=== Kitakata ===
1. Hōjō Yasutoki (r. 1221–1224)
2. Hōjō Tokiuji (r. 1224–1230)
3. Hōjō Shigetoki (r. 1230–1247)
4. Hōjō Nagatoki (r. 1247–1256)
5. Hōjō Tokimochi (r. 1256–1270)
6. Hōjō Yoshimune (r. 1271–1276)
7. Hōjō Tokimura (r. 1277–1287)
8. Hōjō Kanetoki (r. 1287–1293)
9. Hōjō Hisatoki (r. 1293–1297)
10. Hōjō Munekata (r. 1297–1300)
11. Hōjō Mototoki (r. 1301–1303)
12. Hōjō Tokinori (r. 1303–1307)
13. Hōjō Sadaaki (r. 1311–1314)
14. Hōjō Tokiatsu (r. 1315–1320)
15. Hōjō Norisada (r. 1321–1330)
16. Hōjō Nakatoki (r. 1330–1333)

=== Minamikata ===
1. Hōjō Tokifusa (r. 1221–1225)
2. Hōjō Tokimori (r. 1224–1242)
3. Hōjō Tokisuke (r. 1264–1272)
4. Hōjō Tokikuni (r. 1277–1284)
5. Hōjō Kanetoki (r. 1284–1287)
6. Hōjō Morifusa (r. 1288–1297)
7. Hōjō Munenobu (r. 1297–1302)
8. Hōjō Sadaaki (r. 1302–1308)
9. Hōjō Sadafusa (r. 1308–1309)
10. Hōjō Tokiatsu (r. 1311–1315)
11. Hōjō Koresada (r. 1315–1324)
12. Hōjō Sadayuki (r. 1324–1330)
13. Hōjō Tokimasu (r. 1330–1333)
