= Nitta Yoshisuke =

14th-century Japanese samurai

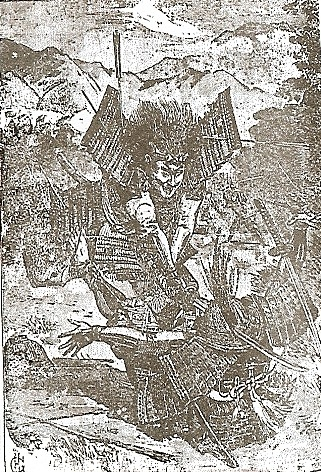

Nitta Yoshisuke (新田義助) also known as Wakiya Yoshisuke (脇屋義助) , (1305–1340) was the brother of Nitta Yoshisada in the early fourteenth century, and supported the Southern Court of Emperor Go-Daigo in the Nanboku-chō period, capturing Kamakura with his brother from the Hōjō clan in 1333.

Both Nitta brothers survived the Siege of Kanegasaki (1337) by fleeing to Somayama.

After his brother died, he fled to various parts of Japan including Mino, Owari, and Yoshino.

In 1339, under orders from the new Emperor Go-Murakami, he captured Shiba Takatsune's fortress at Kuromaru. He died while on campaign in Iyo.
