= Tokugawa Yoshinobu family =

Tokugawa Yoshinobu family 徳川慶喜家
- Tokugawa clan mon
- Parent house: Tokugawa clan
- Titles: Prince
- Founder: Tokugawa Yoshinobu
- Founding year: 1902
- Ruled until: 1947 (title obsolete)

The Tokugawa Yoshinobu family (徳川慶喜家, Tokugawa Yoshinobu-ke) was founded in 1902 when Emperor Meiji permitted Tokugawa Yoshinobu, the last shōgun of Japan, to found a house with the highest rank of nobility, kōshaku (Prince). The title was officially declared obsolete in 1947, though the family still maintained it until the death of Yoshitomo Tokugawa in 2017.

The wife of Nobuhito, Prince Takamatsu (third son of Emperor Taishō) was Kikuko Tokugawa, daughter of the second Prince of the Yoshinobu-ke, Yoshihisa.

== Heads of the Family ==
1. 1902–1913 徳川慶喜 Prince Tokugawa Yoshinobu, 1st Prince of the Yoshinobu-ke (1837–1913)
2. 1913–1922 徳川慶久 Prince Yoshihisa Tokugawa, 2nd Prince of the Yoshinobu-ke (1884–1922)
3. 1922–1993 徳川慶光 Prince Yoshimitsu Tokugawa, 3rd Prince of the Yoshinobu-ke (1913–1993)
4. 1993–2017 徳川慶朝 Yoshitomo Tokugawa, 4th head of the Yoshinobu-ke (1950–2017)
5. 2017- 山岸美喜 Miki Yamagishi, 5th head of the Yoshinobu-ke (1968–)
