= Hosokawa Akiuji =

Hosokawa Akiuji (細川 顕氏; died August 15, 1352) was a samurai general in the service of the Ashikaga Northern Court, during Japan's Nanboku-chō period.

== Life ==
In 1338, he was sent by Ashikaga Takauji to assist in the defence of the Kuromaru, a fortress belonging to Kanrei Shiba Takatsune. His men clashed with fifty horsemen under the command of Nitta Yoshisada, one of the more famous commanders of the rival Southern Court. Nitta was mortally wounded by an arrow in this exchange.

In 1347, he faced Kusunoki Masatsura at Sakai no ura in Izumi Province. Hosokawa was greatly outnumbered, and so he broke off his attack. He was followed by Kusunoki, and was defeated in a night attack at Kawachi, suffering numerous casualties. Hosokawa fell back to Tennoji, and was defeated again, despite the aid of Yamana Tokiuji. Though Kusunoki was defeated and killed soon afterwards, at the Battle of Shijō Nawate, Hosokawa Akiuji did not take part.

In 1352, he helped Ashikaga Yoshiakira in pushing back Loyalist forces to Anau.
