= Minamoto no Yoshikuni =

Samurai

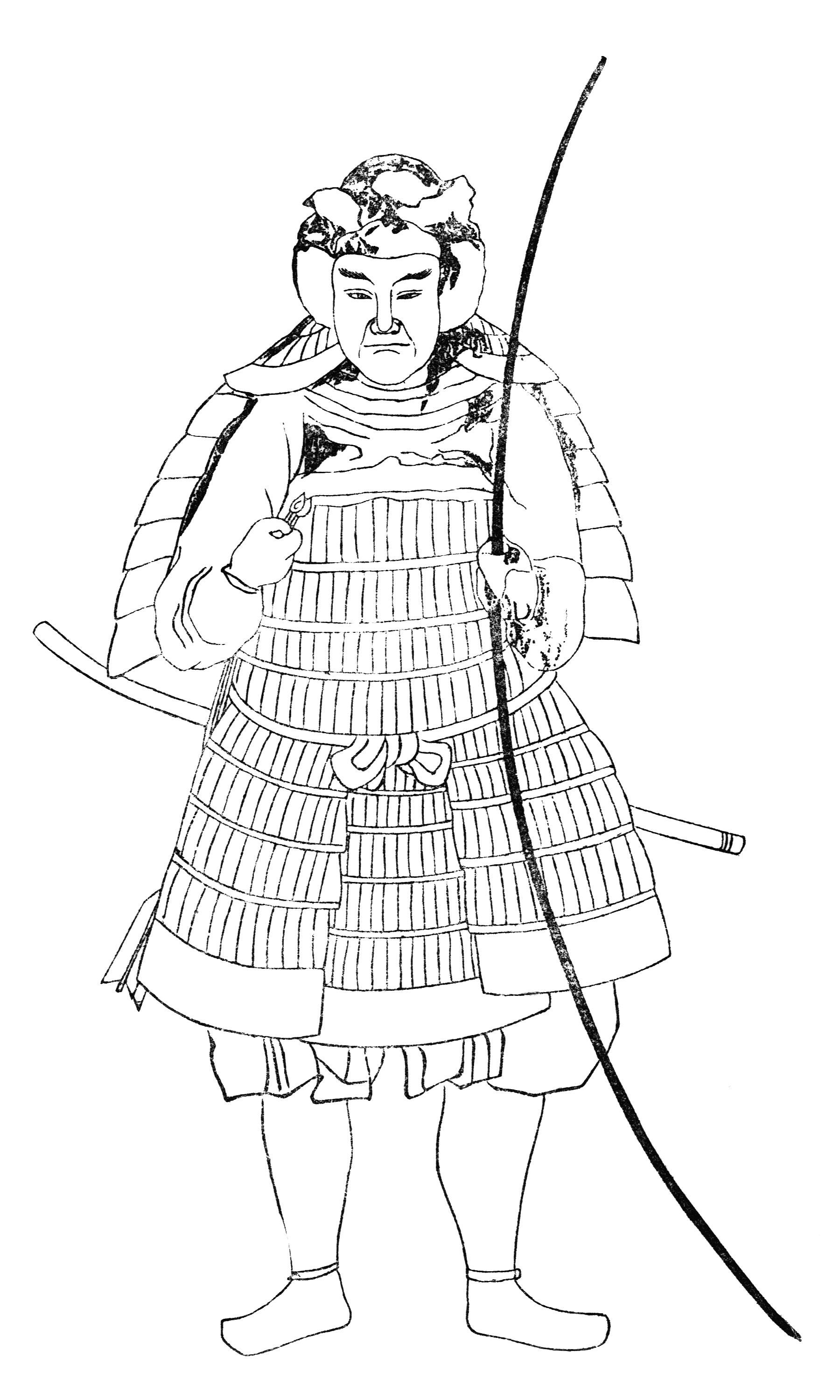

Minamoto no Yoshikuni (源 義国; 1082–1155) was son of famous samurai Minamoto no Yoshiie, and was an ancestor of the Ashikaga and Nitta clans. Yoshikuni was the samurai who first implored the spirit of the Iwashimizu Shrine to start living in this bamboo grove and he built the shrine in honor of the god Hachiman. His childhood name was Kugenmaru (普賢丸). He became a monk in 1154, dying two years later.

== Family ==
- Father: Minamoto no Yoshiie
- Mother: Daughter of Fujiwara no Aritsuna (藤原有綱の娘)
- Children:
  - Minamoto no Yoshishige
  - Minamoto no Yoshiyasu

== Family tree ==
Emperor Seiwa
"Hachimantarō" Yoshiie
Minamoto no Yoshichika	Minamoto no Yoshikuni
Nitta clan	Ashikaga clan
Minamoto no Tameyoshi	Nitta Yoshishige	Ashikaga Yoshiyasu
Yamana clan
Minamoto no Yoshitomo	Nitta Yoshikane	Yamana Yoshinori	Ashikaga Yoshikane	Minamoto no Yoshikiyo
Minamoto no Yoritomo	Ashikaga Yoshiuji	Hirosawa Yoshizane
Kira clan	Hosokawa clan
Ashikaga Yasuuji	Kira Osauji	Hosokawa Yoshisue
Uesugi clan	Imagawa clan
Uesugi Shigefusa	Ashikaga Yoriuji	Kira Mitsuuji	Imagawa Kuniuji
Uesugi Yorishige	Ashikaga Ietoki
Uesugi Kiyoko	Ashikaga Sadauji	Hojō Hisatoki
Nitta Yoshisada	Ashikaga Takauji	Akahashi Tōshi	Hōjō Moritoki
Ashikaga Yoshiakira
