= Nitta Yoshiaki =

Nitta Yoshiaki (新田義顕) (died 1337), son of Nitta Yoshisada, fought for Emperor Go-Daigo, against the Ashikaga at the end of the Kamakura period. He was one of the chief generals at the fortress of Kanagasaki, which fell to the Ashikaga; Yoshiaki was killed, and Prince Tsunenaga captured.
