= Hōjō Sadaaki =

15th Shikken of the Kamakura shogunate

Hōjō Sadaaki 北条 貞顕
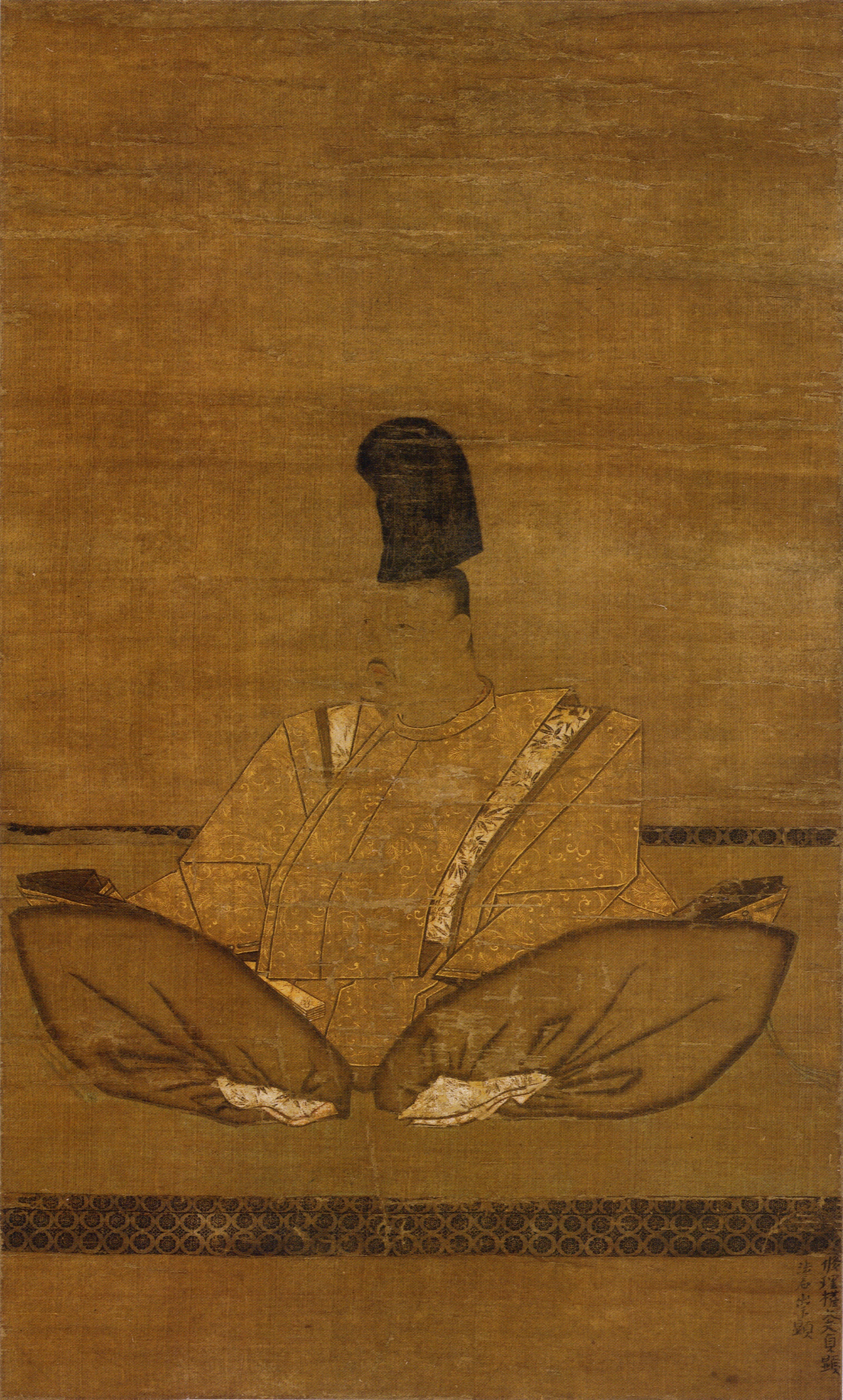

Shikken
- In office 19 April 1326 – 29 April 1326
- Monarch: Go-Daigo
- Shōgun: Prince Morikuni
- Preceded by: Hōjō Takatoki
- Succeeded by: Hōjō Moritoki

Rensho
- In office 1315–1326
- Preceded by: Hōjō Hirotoki
- Succeeded by: Hōjō Koresada

Personal details
- Born: 1278
- Died: 4 July 1333
- Spouse: daughter of Hōjō Tokimura
- Children: Kenjo; Hōjō Sadayuki; Ken'e; Hōjō Sadafuyu; Hōjō Sadamasa; Hōjō Sadataka; Teijo; Dōken
- Parents: Hōjō Akitoki (father); Iri-dono (mother)

Hōjō Sadaaki (北条 貞顕, 1278 – 4 July 1333) was the 12th rensho (1315–1326) and 15th shikken (19 April 1326 – 29 April 1326) of the Kamakura shogunate.

Preceded by Hōjō Takatoki	Hōjō Regent; 1326	Succeeded by Hōjō Moritoki
Preceded by Hōjō Hirotoki	Rensho; 1315–1326	Succeeded by Hōjō Koresada
Preceded by Hōjō Tokinori	Rokuhara Tandai (Kitakata); 1311–1314	Succeeded by Hōjō Tokiatsu
Preceded by Hōjō Munenobu	Rokuhara Tandai (Minamikata); 1302–1308	Succeeded by Hōjō Sadafusa
