= Siege of Kanegasaki (1337) =

Ashikaga shogunate victory in Japan

- Part of the Nanboku-chō Wars
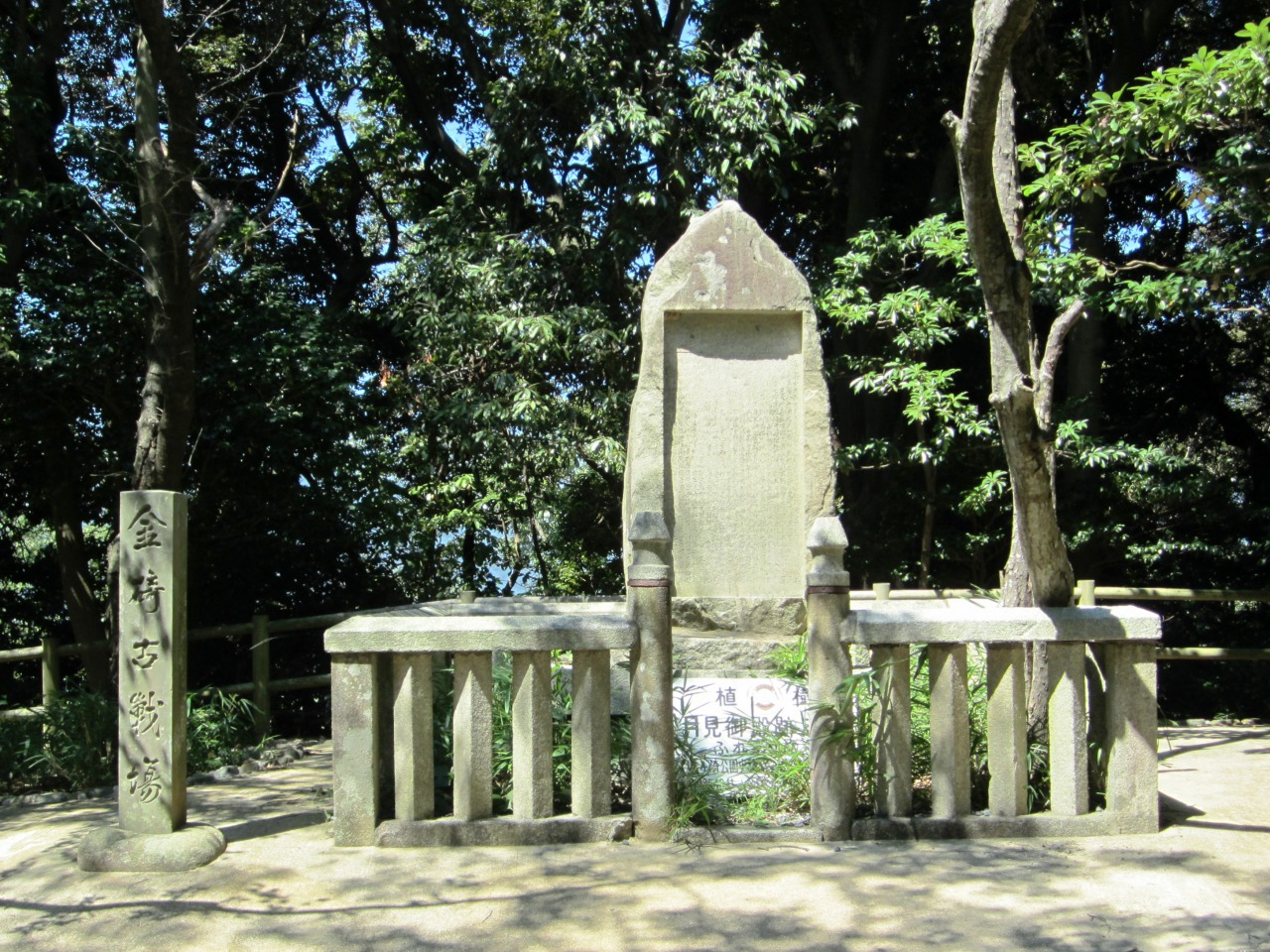
Date	January - April 7, 1337
Location	Kanegasaki fortress, Tsuruga, Echizen Province
Result	Shogunate victory

Belligerents
Ashikaga shogunate	Nitta family

Commanders and leaders
Kō no Moroyasu	Nitta Yoshisada

The 1337 siege of Kanegasaki (金ヶ崎の戦い, Kanegasaki no Tatakai) was the final battle for the Nitta family in their support of the Southern Imperial Court against the Ashikaga Pretenders of the Northern Court.

Nitta Yoshisada's fortress at Kanegasaki was besieged for three months by forces in support of Ashikaga Takauji. Nitta's ally Uryū Tamotsu was forced back to the fortress of Somayama in March 1337, and Nitta Yoshisada joined him there soon afterwards, hoping to lead a counterstrike to lift the siege. This failed, and the occupants of the besieged castle, having run out of food and water, were forced to eat horseflesh to survive. In accordance with Buddhist belief, this was close to the worst disgrace one could face; eating horseflesh was believed to break one's karma, forcing them to be reborn in the next life as an animal or something worse.

Nevertheless, the defenders held out for twenty days longer, and on April 7, Kō no Moroyasu, commander of the besieging army, broke through the walls and took the fortress. Prince Takanaga and Nitta Yoshiaki, son of Yoshisada, were forced to take their own lives. Prince Tsunenaga escaped, but was captured soon afterwards and killed as well.

== See also ==
- Siege of Kanegasaki (1570)
