= Minamoto no Yoshishige =

Samurai from Kyoto

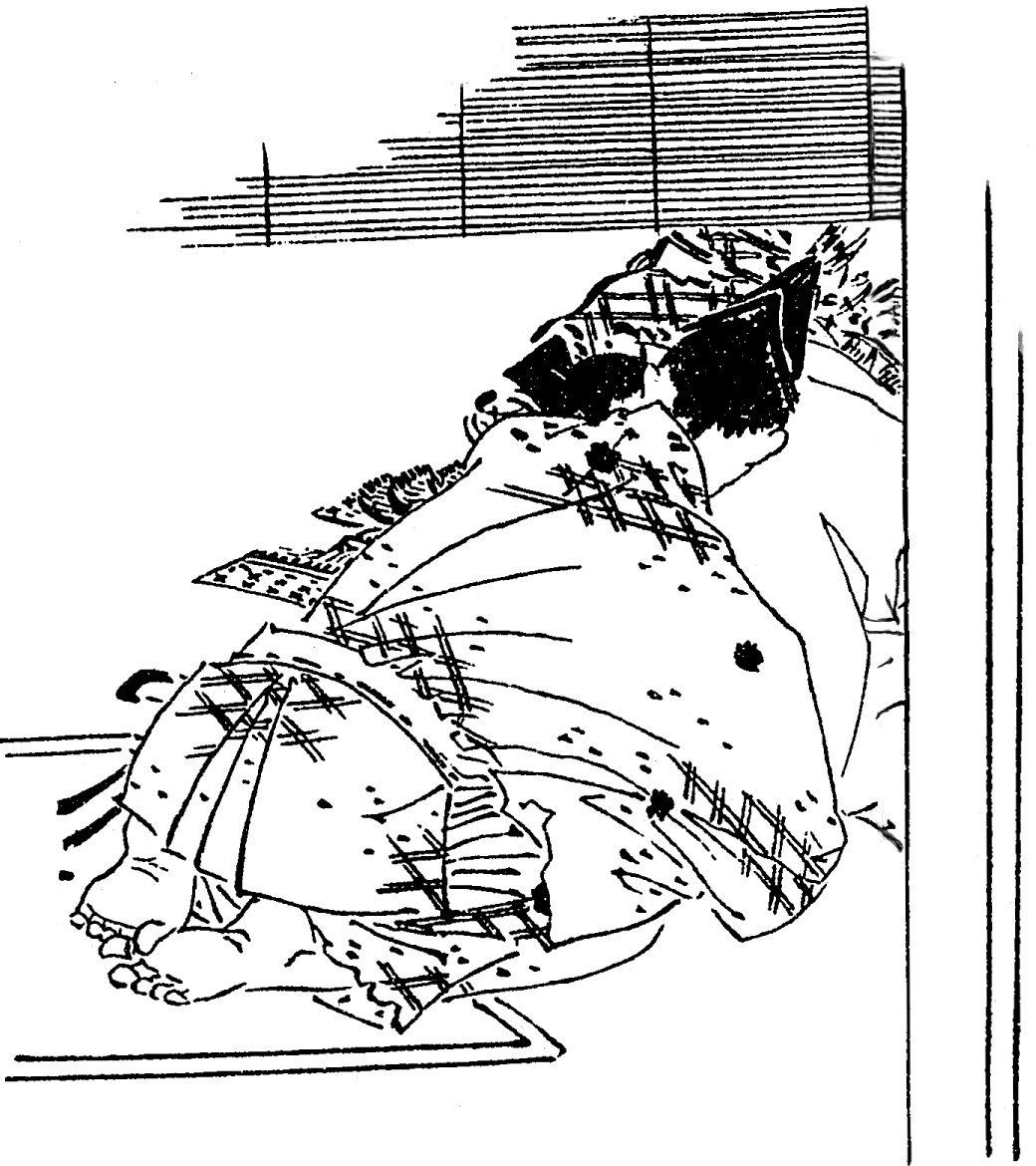
Minamoto no Yoshishige

Minamoto no Yoshishige (源 義重; 1135–1202) was the progenitor of the cadet Nitta branch family of the Minamoto samurai clan, who fought alongside the Minamoto in the Genpei War. He is also known as Nitta Tarō and Nitta Yoshishige.

His father was Minamoto no Yoshikuni and his grandfather Minamoto no Yoshiie.

In 1156, he fought in the Hogen Rebellion with Taira no Kiyomori. He also fought with Kiyomori in the Heiji Rebellion in 1160 along with his younger brother Minamoto no Yoshiyasu. However, he switched sides shortly after the rebellion and fought with the Minamoto in the Genpei War two decades later. He fought in the Battle of Awazu with his brother in 1184, and again in the Battle of Yashima a year later. He died in 1202.

Yoshishige was posthumously awarded the title of Chinjufu-shōgun, or Commander-in-chief of the Defense of the North, in 1611, four centuries after his death, by the second Tokugawa shōgun, Tokugawa Hidetada.

He ordained as a Buddhist monk and received the Dharma name Jōnichi (上西).
