= Shiba Takatsune =

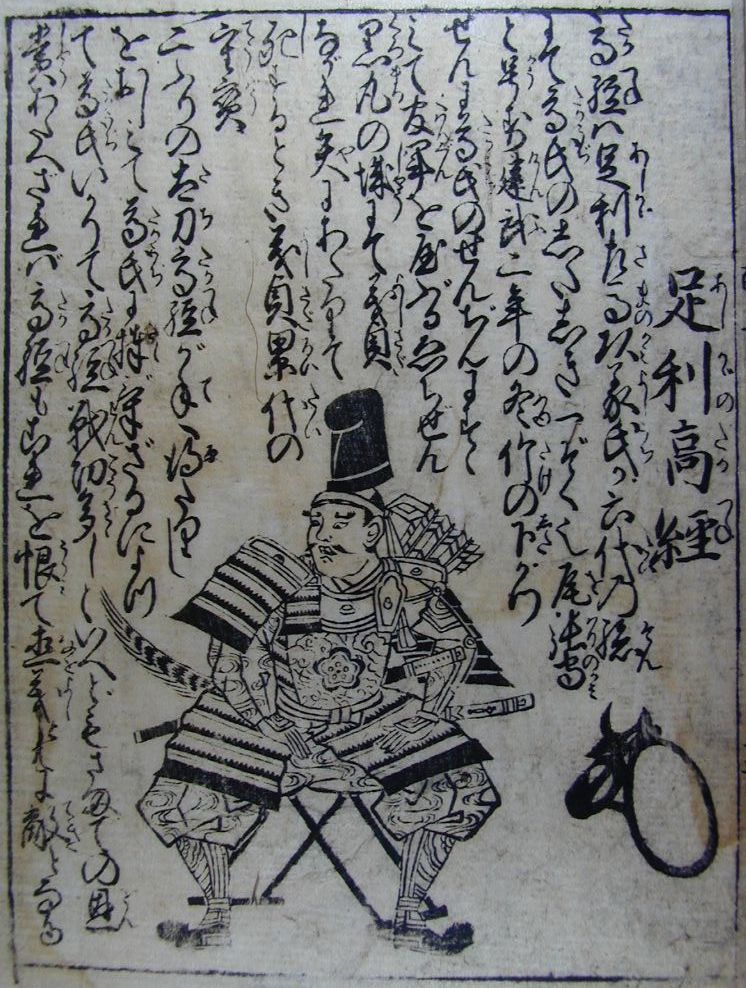

Shiba Takatsune (斯波 高経; 1305 – August 9, 1367) was the Constable (shugo) of Echizen Province during the 14th century Nanboku-chō Wars in Japan. He acted to block the northward progress of Nitta Yoshisada, who supported the Emperor's Southern Court against the shōgun's Northern Court. Shiba, in his role as Constable, served the shōgun and thus the Northern Court.

In 1336, an ally of Nitta named Uryū Tamotsu attacked Shiba's castle, which fell soon afterwards. Two years later, Shiba was ordered by the shogun Ashikaga Takauji to attack Uryū's fortress at Somayama. The attack failed, and Shiba was forced to fight Nitta's forces again in the defense of the Kuromaru (Black Fortress). With the aid of forces sent by Takauji and warrior monks from Heisenji, the fortress was held, and Nitta Yoshisada mortally wounded in the battle.

Despite this great victory, Shiba was defeated once again in 1340, when the newly throned Emperor Go-Murakami sent an army to attack the Kuromaru. Shiba was forced to surrender.

The same year, a number of men claiming to serve Shiba invaded an area called Kawaguchi-shō, which was controlled by the Kōfuku-ji temple. In 1363 Shiba seized the area officially, becoming essentially a daimyō (feudal lord), gaining independent power beyond what was given him by the Shogunate. The monks of Kōfuku-ji resorted to various forms of blackmail and were granted their land back. However, Shiba continued to gain power, instituting shugo-uke, a system under which the Constable would take a set amount of rice from the people of the land, paying the peoples' taxes to the Shogun and keeping the rest as a sort of commission. Of those few Constables who became lords in their own right, most if not all abused this system, earning great revenues for themselves.

Shiba Yoshimasa was the son of Takatsune.

== Family ==
- Father: Shiba Muneuji
- Mother: Nagai Tokihide's daughter
- Children:
  - Shiba Yoshimasa
  - Shiba Ienaga (1321–1338)
  - Shiba Ujitsune
  - Shiba Ujiyori
  - Hachisuka Kagenari

== See also ==
- Shiba clan
