= Hōjō Moritoki =

16th (the last) Shikken of the Kamakura shogunate

Hōjō Moritoki 北条 守時
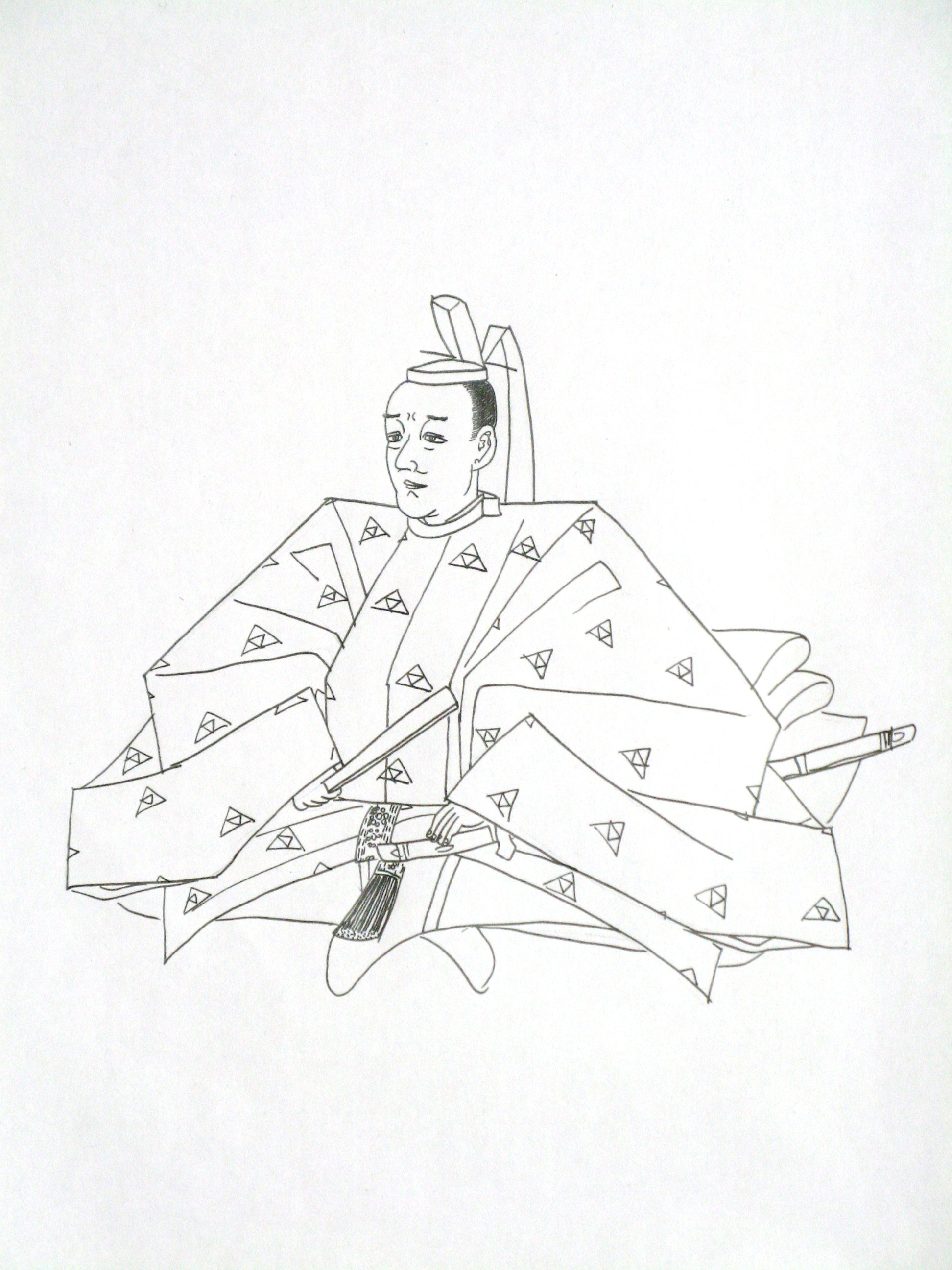

Shikken
- In office 25 May 1326 – 30 June 1333
- Monarch: Go-Daigo
- Shōgun: Prince Morikuni
- Rensho: Hōjō Koresada; Hōjō Shigetoki
- Preceded by: Hōjō Sadaaki
- Succeeded by: Hōjō Sadayuki

Personal details
- Born: 1295
- Died: 30 June 1333
- Spouse: daughter of Hōjō Tokimura
- Children: Hōjō Masutoki; a daughter
- Parents: Hōjō Hisatoki (father); daughter of Hōjō Muneyori (mother)

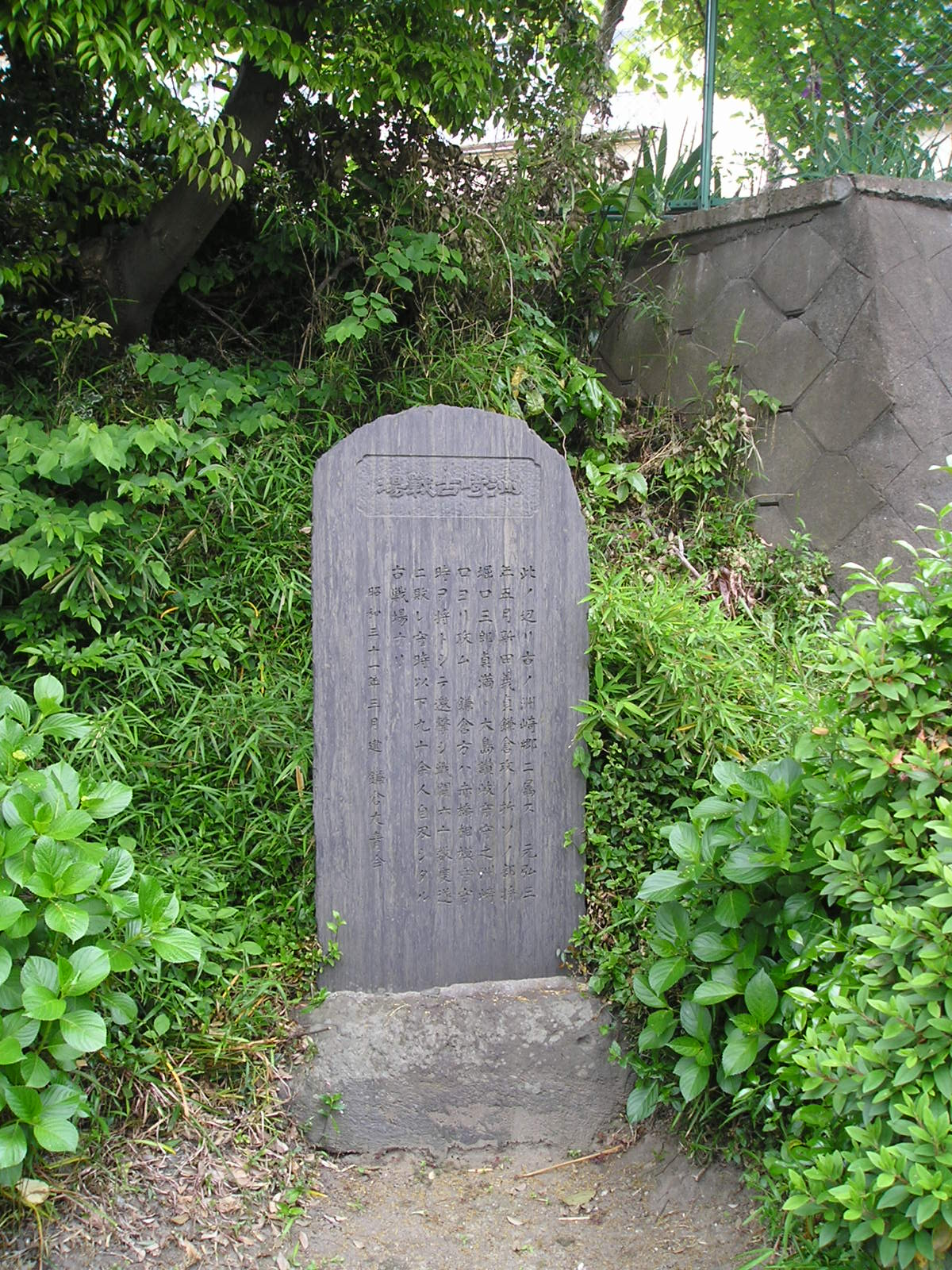
A stone monument at the place where Moritoki died in battle

Hojo Moritoki (北条 守時, 1295–1333) was the last Shikken (Regent) of the Kamakura shogunate and the last regent of the Hōjō clan.

Preceded by Hōjō Sadaaki	Hōjō Regent; 1326-1333	Succeeded by (none)
