= Nitta clan =

Major family descended from Seiwa Genji

Nitta 新田
- The mon of the Nitta clan.
- Parent house: Minamoto clan (Seiwa Genji)
- Titles: Various
- Founder: Nitta Yoshishige (Minamoto no Yoshishige)
- Final ruler: Nitta Yoshisada
- Founding year: 12th century
- Ruled until: 1338, death of Nitta Yoshisada
- Cadet branches: Tokugawa clan Matsudaira clan Sakai clan Wakiya clan Yamana clan Serada clan Horiguchi clan Iwamatsu clan Odachi clan

The Nitta clan (新田氏, Nitta-shi; Japanese pronunciation: [ɲiꜜt.ta(.ɕi)]) was one of several major families descended from the Seiwa Genji, and numbered among the chief enemies of the Hōjō clan regents, and later the Ashikaga shogunate. The common ancestor of the Nitta, Minamoto no Yoshishige (1135–1202), was the elder brother of Minamoto no Yoshiyasu, the common ancestor of the Ashikaga clan. Yoshishige was a landowner in the Nitta District of Kōzuke Province in present-day Gunma Prefecture. Yoshishige supported Minamoto no Yoritomo (1147–1199) in the Battle of Ishibashiyama of 1180 against the Taira clan.

The Nitta clan rose to importance in the early 13th century; they controlled Kozuke Province, and had little influence in Kamakura, the capital of the Kamakura shogunate, because their ancestor, Minamoto no Yoshishige had not joined his fellow clansmen in the Genpei War a century earlier.

In the 1330s, Nitta Yoshisada led the clan and a number of other Minamoto vassals against the Hōjō clan regents. They succeeded, in June 1333, in destroying the Bakufu's buildings in Kamakura.

The Nitta clan played an important role once again, allying with the Date clan and the Southern Courts, during the Nanboku-cho wars of the late 14th century.

== The successive present head of a household ==
1. Nitta Yoshishige
2. Nitta Yoshikane
3. Nitta Yoshihusa
4. Nitta Masayoshi
5. Nitta Masauji
6. Nitta Motouji
7. Nitta Tomouji
8. Nitta Yoshisada

== See also ==
- Nitta Yoshiaki - son of Yoshisada
- Nitta Yoshioki - son of Yoshisada
- Nitta Yoshimune - son of Yoshisada
- Wakiya Yoshisuke - brother of Yoshisada, and founder of a branch family of Nitta, called Wakiya
