= Nitta Yoshimune =

Nitta Yoshimune (新田 義宗; 1335 – 1368) was the third son of Nitta Yoshisada, and a commander of loyalist (Imperial) forces during the Nanbokuchō Wars.

In April 1352, Yoshimune led a force from Echigo Province to contribute to the loyalist efforts to drive the Shōgun, Ashikaga Takauji, from Kamakura. He defeated Takauji in a number of short engagements, but was eventually driven back to a place called Kotesashi-hara, and then to Echigo.
