= Minamoto no Yoshiyasu =

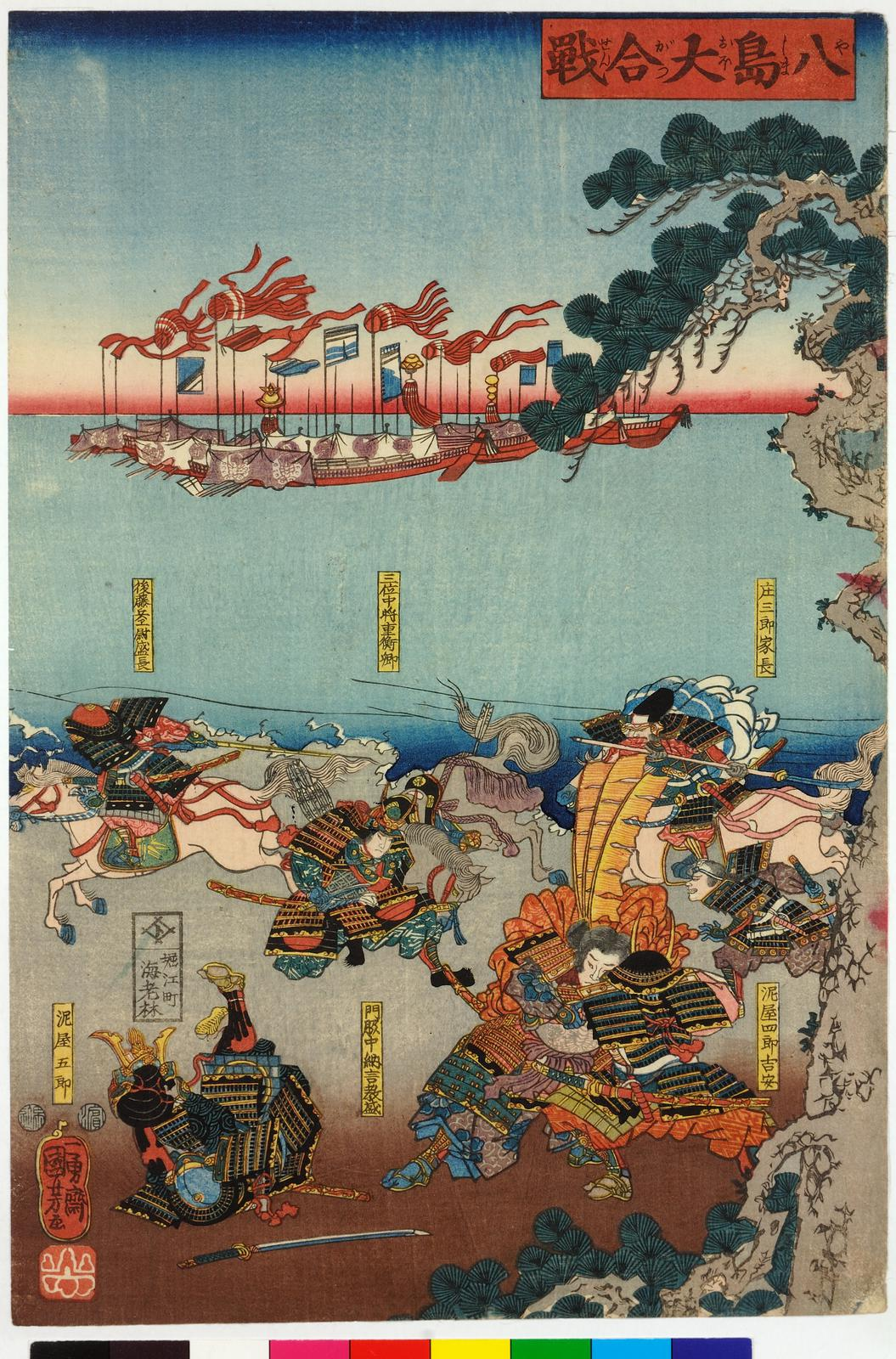
A battle on the shore with the Taira fleet approaching by boat in the background; Kumagae Naozane and Taira no Atsumori (centre), locked in combat, fall from their horses, and Matsudaira Norimori wrestles with Minamoto no Yoshiyasu (right).

Minamoto no Yoshiyasu (源 義康, 1139 – 1157), also known as Ashikaga Yoshiyasu (足利 義康), was a Japanese samurai of the late Heian period. He is known for his participation in the Hōgen rebellion in 1156. He is best known as the founder of the Ashikaga clan.

== Life ==
Yoshiyasu was born in 1139, as the son of Minamoto no Yoshikuni.

During the Hōgen rebellion in 1156, he burned one of the Minamoto clan's mansions in Kyoto, and killed Minamoto no Tameyoshi. He was killed shortly after in 1157.

== Family ==
- Father: Minamoto no Yoshikuni
- Mother: daughter of Minamoto no Arifusa

== See also ==
- Seiwa Genji
