= Nitta Yoshisada =

Japanese samurai lord (1301–1338)

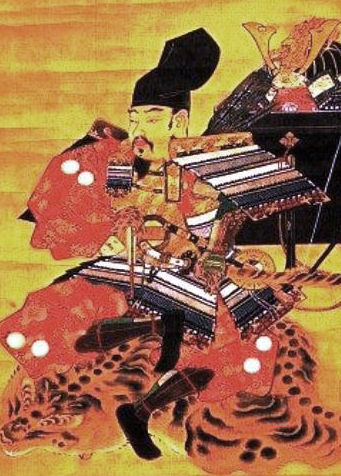
Nitta Yoshisada

Nitta Yoshisada (新田 義貞; Japanese pronunciation: [ɲiꜜt.ta | jo.ɕi̥.saꜜ.da], 1301 – August 17, 1338) also known as Minamoto no Yoshisada was a samurai lord of the Nanboku-chō period Japan. He was the head of the Nitta clan in the early fourteenth century, and supported the Southern Court of Emperor Go-Daigo in the Nanboku-chō period. He famously marched on Kamakura, besieging and capturing it from the Hōjō clan in 1333.

Later, he fought the Ashikaga brothers on the Emperor's behalf in a see-saw campaign which saw the capital change hands several times. After a peaceful compromise was agreed, Yoshisada was entrusted with two royal princes. At the siege of Kanegasaki (1337), both princes were killed, along with Yoshisada's son, although Yoshisada was able to escape. He committed seppuku when his horse was killed at the siege of Kuromaru.

== Early life ==
Yoshisada was born in 1301, the eldest son of Nitta Tomouji. He succeeded his father and became the lord of Nitta Manor in Kōzuke Province in 1317. At this time, he also became the head of the Nitta clan. Yoshisada courted a daughter of a court noble, Kōtō-Naishi (匂当内侍), and married her through the emperor's mediation.

== Kamakura campaign ==
Long an enemy of Ashikaga Takauji, Nitta Yoshisada is often blamed for the split between the Northern and Southern Courts, as he fought against the Ashikaga and for the emperor, Emperor Go-Daigo. This rivalry came largely from the fact that the Ashikaga were ranked above the Nitta, despite their being descended from a younger ancestor; since the ancestors of the Nitta did not fight alongside their Minamoto cousins in the Genpei War, they were never accorded power or prestige at Kamakura.

=== March on Kamakura ===
In 1331, after being ordered by the bakufu (shogunate) to join an army at the Chihaya fortress, Nitta was ordered by Prince Morinaga and Emperor Go-Daigo to strike at the Hōjō, so he left his post. Returning to his home province of Kozuke, Yoshisada rallied the aid of other descendants and vassals, including his brother Yoshisuke of the Minamoto clan, and began to march toward Kamakura through Musashi. On the approaches to the city, Nitta enjoyed some early victories, routing the Hōjō defenders and pursuing them towards the city.

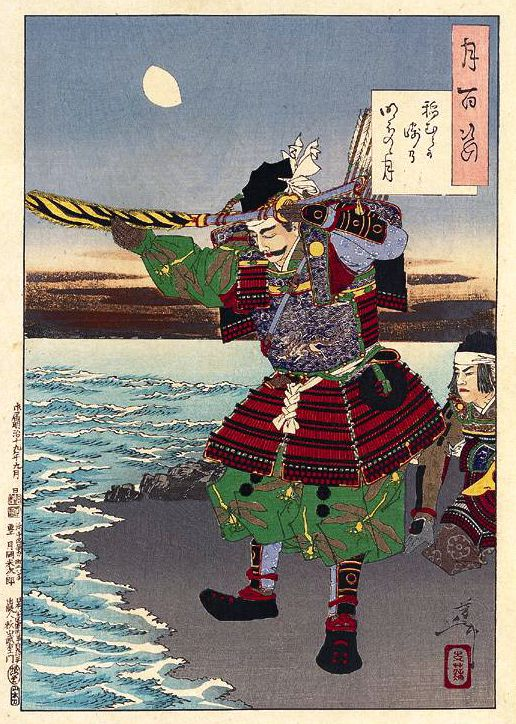
Nitta Yoshisada offering his sword to Ryūjin

Except for its coastline, Kamakura is surrounded by steep hills, making an overland attack difficult. Nitta first tried to enter through the Gokurakuji Pass and the Kewaizaka Pass, but strong Hōjō forces stopped him. Judging it's impossible to enter by land, Nitta decided to try by sea, bypassing Inamuragasaki Cape on Sagami Bay, west of Kamakura. Once there, Nitta took advantage of a low tide and moved his men in through the beaches to the south, but according to the Taiheiki, he threw his sword into the surf and prayed to Ryūjin, who parted the waters for him. Taiheiki states,

Dismounting from his horse, Yoshisada removed his helmet and prostrating himself across the distant seas prayed to Ryūjin. "It is said that the lord of Japan from the beginning, Amaterasu Ōmikami, enshrined at Ise Jingū, hid herself within a Vairocana and appeared as Ryūjin of the vast blue seas. My lord (Emperor Go-Daigo) is her descendant, and drifts upon waves of the western sea due to rebels. I Yoshisada, in an attempt to serve as a worthy subject, will pick up my axes and face the enemy line. That desire is to aid the nation and bring welfare to the masses. Ryūjin of the Eight Protectorate Gods of the (seven) Inner Seas and the Outer Sea, witness this subject's loyalty and withdraw the waters afar, open a path to the lines of the three armies.

He therefore speaks to Ryūjin who, he has heard, is a manifestation of Amaterasu. The stele at Sode no Ura (袖の浦), the tiny bay west of Inamuragaki, says:

666 years ago on May 21, 1333 Nitta Yoshisada, judging an invasion on land to be difficult, decided to try to bypass this cape. This is the place where, according to tradition, he threw his golden sword into the waves, praying the sea-god to withdraw them and let him pass. (Erected in 1917)

=== Fall of Kamakura ===
The city was taken, and the Hōjō clan's influence destroyed. Following the fall of Kamakura (and of the Hōjō regency), Yoshisada was appointed governor of Echigo and vice-governor of Harima and Kōzuke Provinces, as Emperor Go-Daigo redistributed the Hōjō lands. He took the Seiwa Genji heirloom Higekiri and the Tenka-Goken Onimaru Kunitsuna.

== Later campaigns ==
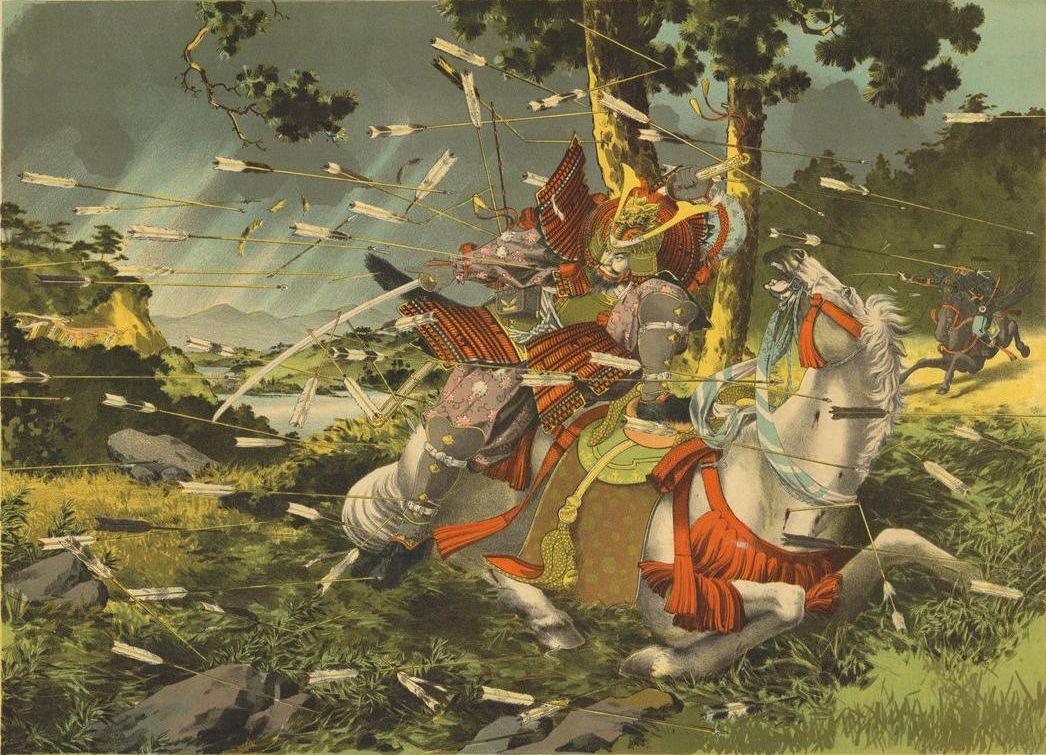
Nitta Yoshisada fighting bravely with the two swords Onikiri and Onimaru at the Battle of Minatogawa (1336)

During the following few years, Nitta Yoshisada's rivalry with Ashikaga Takauji and his brother Ashikaga Tadayoshi came to a head, with an imperial commission to destroy the two brothers issued in 1335. The two armies fought a number of battles, starting at the Yahagi River on December and ending at Mishima later that month. Yoshisada's forces were eventually defeated and the brothers advanced upon Kyoto.

The Ashikagas were able to capture Kyoto for a few days in February 1336, before help arrived for Yoshisada and Kusunoki from Prince Norinaga and Prince Takanaga. In April 1336 Nitta attacked Akamatsu Norimura in Harima Province. He kept up the investment of Akamatsu's strongholds at Shirohata and Mitsuishi until June, when he retreated in the face of advances by Tadayoshi's army. Yoshisada was defeated in the Battle of Minatogawa allowing Takauji to occupy Kyoto once again.

Nitta retreated with the emperor to Hieizan. Eventually, on November 13, 1336, the emperor agreed with Takauji's offers to return to Kyoto. Before he did so, he entrusted Nitta with escorting Prince Takanaga and Prince Tsunenaga to Echizen Province. They made it as far as a loyalist stronghold, where they had to endure the siege of Kanegasaki (1337). Nitta escaped, but his son Nitta Yoshiaki and the princes were eventually killed.

== Death ==
Nitta's death was as remarkable as his life. While Nitta was fighting in the siege of Kuromaru against Hosokawa Akiuji, an ally of Takauji, his horse was felled by arrow fire. Nitta, pinned under the dead horse and unable to move, was an easy target for archers. As a final act, Nitta is supposed to have drawn his short sword and cut off his own head. Record has it that a number of his fellow samurai committed junshi seppuku nearby, in a show of allegiance. Yoshisada died on August 17, 1338.

== Family tree ==
Emperor Seiwa
"Hachimantarō" Yoshiie
Minamoto no Yoshichika	Minamoto no Yoshikuni
Nitta clan	Ashikaga clan
Minamoto no Tameyoshi	Nitta Yoshishige	Ashikaga Yoshiyasu
Yamana clan
Minamoto no Yoshitomo	Nitta Yoshikane	Yamana Yoshinori	Ashikaga Yoshikane	Minamoto no Yoshikiyo
Minamoto no Yoritomo	Ashikaga Yoshiuji	Hirosawa Yoshizane
Kira clan	Hosokawa clan
Ashikaga Yasuuji	Kira Osauji	Hosokawa Yoshisue
Uesugi clan	Imagawa clan
Uesugi Shigefusa	Ashikaga Yoriuji	Kira Mitsuuji	Imagawa Kuniuji
Uesugi Yorishige	Ashikaga Ietoki
Uesugi Kiyoko	Ashikaga Sadauji	Hojō Hisatoki
Nitta Yoshisada	Ashikaga Takauji	Akahashi Tōshi	Hōjō Moritoki
Ashikaga Yoshiakira

== Honours ==
- Senior First Rank (August 7, 1882; posthumous)

== See also ==
- Fujishima Shrine
- Nitta Yoshiaki - son of Yoshisada
- Nitta Yoshioki - son of Yoshisada
- Nitta Yoshimune - son of Yoshisada
- Wakiya Yoshisuke - brother of Yoshisada, and founder of a branch family of Nitta, called Wakiya
