= 1300s (decade) =

Decade

The 1300s was a decade of the Julian Calendar that began on 1 January 1300 and ended on 31 December 1309.

== Events ==
=== 1301 ===
==== January– March ====
- January 14 – With the death of King Andrew III ("the Venetian") after a short illness, possibly from poisoning, the Árpád Dynasty in Hungary ends. This results in a power struggle between Wenceslaus III of Bohemia, Otto III of Bavaria, and Charles Robert of Naples. Eventually, Wenceslaus is elected and crowned as king of Hungary and Croatia. His rule is only nominal, because a dozen powerful Hungarian nobles hold sway over large territories in the kingdom.
- January 25 – Second Mongol invasion of Burma: The forces of Temür Khan, Mongol leader who also serves as the Emperor Chengzong of China, reach Myinsaing, capital of the Myinsaing Kingdom in central Burma, and begin a siege of the city that will last for almost three months before the invasion leaders are paid to leave.
- February 7 – The 16-year-old Prince Edward of Caernarfon, son and heir of King Edward I ("Edward Longshanks"), becomes the first Prince of Wales and is also granted the royal lands in Wales.
- February 28 – Second Mongol invasion of Burma: Five weeks after beginning the siege of Myinsaing with no success, the Mongol invaders launch a major assault, but the Burmese defenders continue their defense for 12 days, leading to a truce.
- March 2 – (Shōan 3, 21st day of the 1st month) Emperor Go-Fushimi abdicates the throne after a 2½-year reign. He is succeeded by his 15-year-old cousin, Go-Nijō, as the 94th emperor of Japan. Go-Nijō will reign until 1308.
- March 12 – Second Mongol invasion of Burma: After seven weeks of a stalemate, the Mongols and the Burmese begin negotiations for a truce.

==== April– June ====
- April 8 – Second Mongol invasion of Burma: The three Bagan brothers (Athinkhaya, Yazathingyan and Thihathu) who rule the Burmese Kingdom of Myinsaing reach an agreement for Mongol leader Temür Khan and his officers to be paid 800 taels (30 kg) of gold and 2200 taels (83 kg) of silver in return for ending the invasion and returning to Mongolia.
- April 10 – In the Principality of Monaco, the first Grimaldi family ruler, Rainier I, is forced to flee as troops from the Republic of Genoa besiege the Monacans. The Genoese rule will last for more than 30 years, until September 12, 1331.
- May 13 – After an attempt in the spring to have Prince Charles of Anjou succeed the late Andrew III as King of Hungary, the Diet of Hungary votes to declare his coronation invalid, in that Charles was not proclaimed king at Székesfehérvár and never received the Crown of Saint Stephen.
- June 22 – Nicola Boccasini, who will become Pope Benedict XI in 1303, begins his duties as the Roman Catholic apostolic legate to Hungary, having been appointed as the personal representative of Pope Boniface VIII.

==== July– September ====
- July 5 – First War of Scottish Independence: King Edward I of England launches his sixth campaign into Scotland, crossing into Berwickshire from Northumberland.
- July 10 – Indian forces under Sultan Alauddin Khalji capture Ranthambore Fortress. During the siege, General Nusrat Khan Jalesari is hit and killed by a manjaniq stone.
- August 5 – The English Army, commanded by King Edward I, reaches Glasgow.
- August 27 – Wenceslaus III of Bohemia is crowned as King of Hungary under the regnal name King Vencel, receiving the Crown of Saint Stephen in a ceremony at Székesfehérvár.
- September 2 – In their invasion of Scotland, English troops under the command of Prince Edward of Caernarfon and Henry de Lacy, Earl of Lincoln, capture Turnberry Castle in Carrick, the headquarters of the Bruces.
- September 3 – Bartolomeo I della Scala becomes the new Lord of Verona, at the time a city-state in Italy that included most of the Veneto region (with the exception of Venice), upon the death of his father Alberto.
- September 16 – In Spain, the Emirate of Granada, ruled by Muhammad al-Faqih, and the Kingdom of Aragon, ruled by Jaime II the Just sign a military agreement to fight against the Kingdom of Castile and to capture the port of Tarifa.

==== October– December ====
- October 5 – (Shoan, 22nd day of the 8th month) Hojo Morotoki becomes the 10th regent for the Kamakura shogunate of Japan.
- October 6 – (2 Safar 701 AH) Abu Numayy I, Arabic ruler of the Emirate of Mecca, abdicates and is succeeded by two of his sons, Rumaythah and Humaydah. Abu Numayy dies two days later at the age of 69.
- November 1 – Charles of Valois, son of the late King Philip III ("Philip the Bold"), is summoned to Italy by Pope Boniface VIII to restore peace between the Guelphs and Ghibellines. He enters Florence, and allows the Neri ("Black Guelphs") to return to the city. Charles installs a new government under Cante dei Gabrielli as Chief Magistrate (podestà), leading to the permanent exile of Dante Alighieri, Italian poet and philosopher, from the city.
- November 9 – Bolko I ("Bolko the Strict"), Polish nobleman and co-ruler dies and is succeeded by his three minor sons (Bernard, 10; Henry, 9; and Bolko II, 2), with his brother-in-law Herman, Margrave of Brandenburg-Salzwedel to serve as regent.
- December 5 – Pope Boniface VIII issues the papal bull Ausculta Fili ("Listen, my son"), accusing King Philip IV of France ("Philip the Fair") of malfeasance of office.
- December 6 – In Spain, Ferdinand IV of Castile reaches the age of 16 and is proclaimed of the age of majority to be crowned as King of Castile and as King of León. Ferdinand IV had become the nominal monarch at age 9, under the regency of his mother, María de Molina.

==== By place ====
====== Middle East ======
- Spring – Sultan Osman I calls for a military campaign to strike deep into Byzantine Bithynia. During the campaign, Ottoman forces capture the towns of İnegöl and Yenişehir. The later town will be transformed into a capital city, as Osman moves his administration and personal household within its walls. By the end of the year, Ottoman forces begin blockading the major Byzantine city of Nicaea.

=== 1302 ===
==== January–March ====
- January 2 – In Germany, Henry II becomes the ruler of the independent nation of Mecklenburg (encompassing the modern-day northeastern German state of Mecklenburg-Vorpommern) upon the death of his father, Henry the Pilgrim. Henry II had served as regent from 1290 to 1298 during Henry the Pilgrim's pilgrimage to the Holy Land, and had continued most of the administration of Mecklenburg after the return of his 68-year-old father.
- January 20 – In Egypt, Al-Mustakfi I becomes the new Muslim Abbasid Caliph of Cairo, leader of Islam within the Mamluk Sultanate, upon the death of his father, the Caliph Al-Hakim I.
- January 23 – King Ferdinand IV of the Spanish Kingdom of Castile, having recently reached the age of majority at age 16, marries 12-year-old Princess Constance, the only daughter of King Dinis of Portugal, in a ceremony at Valladolid.
- January 26 – At the suggestion of France, and pursuant to the treaty signed between England and France at Asnières, King Edward I of England ("Edward Longshanks") and the Scottish nobles led by Robert the Bruce agree to a nine-month peace treaty at Linlithgow, to last until St. Andrew's Day, November 30, 1302.
- February 8 – Yesün Temür becomes the Jinong (crown prince) of the Mongol Empire upon the death of his father Gammala, with authority over the Mongolian steppe north of the Gobi Desert. Yesün Temür will become the Emperor of China's Yuan dynasty in 1323 and reign for almost five years.
- February 10 – The papal bull Ausculta Fili is delivered to Philip the Fair, King of France, but Robert II, Count of Artois, snatches the document from Jacques de Normans, the emissary of Pope Boniface VIII and burns the paper in a fire.
- February 19 – The Italian artist Cimabue completes construction of the image of John the Evangelist, a major portion of the mosaic Christ Enthroned, in the Pisa Cathedral, after 94 days. Cimabue dies shortly afterward, and the full mosaic will not be completed until 1320.
- March 3 – Upon the death of Roger-Bernard III, Count of Foix, who had founded the Co-principality of Andorra in 1278, Roger's son Count Gaston continues as the new French administrator on behalf of King Philip of France. The holder of the title Count of Foix will continue to be the French representative in Andorra, with almost 200 years of unbroken rule, until the death of Gaston IV in 1472.
- March 4 – After learning of the rejection of the papal bull by King Philip of France, Pope Boniface VIII sends Cardinal Jean Lemoine to inform King Philip of the Pope's plans for an ecclesiastical council to control the appointment of French clergy.
- March – Robert the Bruce, the future King of Scotland marries as his second wife the 13-year-old Elizabeth de Burgh at Writtle in Essex. She is the daughter of Richard Óg de Burgh ("the Red Earl"), a powerful Irish nobleman and close friend of King Edward I of England.

==== April–June ====
- April 8 (8 Shaban 701 AH) – Sultan Muhammad II dies after a 29-year reign and is succeeded by his son Muhammad III as ruler of Granada. Within two weeks of his accession, he sends a Nasrid army under Hammu ibn Abd al-Haqq to seize Bedmar and other neighboring strongholds from Castile. Nasrid forces also attack Jódar, northeast of Bedmar, and recapture Quesada. Meanwhile, Muhammad contains friendly relations with King James II ("James the Just").
- April 10 – The first meeting of the Estates General in France is convened King Philip IV ("Philip the Fair") at the Notre-Dame in Paris. During the assembly, all three classes – the French nobles, clergy, and commons – discuss the conflict between Philip and Pope Boniface VIII over the papal legate, Bernard Saisset – who is accused to raise a rebellion of Occitan independence, associated with Navarre, under the banner of the County of Foix.
- April 12 – Ghazan of the Mongol Empire's Ilkhanate division sends a letter to Pope Boniface and announces preparations for a new campaign against the Mamluk Sultanate.
- April 22 – In modern-day Turkey, Byzantine Emperor Michael IX Palaiologos launches a military campaign against Turkish forces who have been conducting raids, and marches from Constantinople. His army travels southward as far as Magnesia ad Maeander (the ruins of which are now near the town of Ortaklar in what is now Turkey's Aydin Province). Palaiologos seeks to directly confront the Turkish forces, but is dissuaded by his generals. In the meantime, the Turks resume their raids, isolating Michael at Magnesia. His army is dissolved without a battle, as the local forces are left behind to defend their homes. The Alans (Byzantine mercenaries) too leave, to rejoin their families in Thrace. Michael is forced to withdraw by the sea, followed by another wave of refugees.
- May 17 – At the age of 12, Eleanor of Anjou, daughter of King Charles II of Naples, marries King Frederick III of Sicily.
- May 18 – Flemish militia kill 2,000 French soldiers in the course of the Matins of Bruges, after Pieter de Coninck and Jan Breydel call on soldiers to kill all of the French occupiers of the city in Flanders. The French Governor of Flanders, Jacques de Châtillon, escapes with a handful of soldiers while disguised as a priest. He arrives in Paris to bring the news of the massacre to King Philip the Fair, who sends an army to capture the city.
- June 12 – The Baltic Sea town of Wesenberg in Danish Estonia (modern-day Rakvere) receives municipal self-government under the Hanseatic League doctrine of Lübeck law.
- June 14 – Matteo I Visconti, Lord of Milan (Signore di Milano), the semi-independent Italian region within the Holy Roman Empire, is deposed by Guido della Torre, but will return in 1311.

==== July–September ====
- July 11 – The Battle of the Golden Spurs takes place as France retaliates against Flanders for the May 18 Matins of Bruges massacre. Flemish forces led by William of Jülich ("William the Younger") and Pieter de Coninck defeat the French army (some 9,000 men) at Kortrijk in Flanders. The cavalry charges of the French prove unable to defeat the untrained Flemish infantry militia, consisting mainly of members of the craft guilds. Many French nobles (some 500 knights) are killed, like the commander Robert II of Artois, and forced to retreat.
- July 27 – Battle of Bapheus: To counter the Turkish threat at Nicomedia, Emperor Andronikos II Palaiologos sends a Byzantine force (some 2,000 men) to cross over the Bosporus to relieve the city. On the plain, Turkish forces (some 5,000 light cavalry) led by Sultan Osman I defeat the Byzantines, who are forced to withdraw to Nicomedia. After the battle, Andronikos loses control of the countryside of Bithynia, withdrawing to the forts. Meanwhile, Turkish forces capture Byzantine settlements, such as the coastal city of Gemlik.
- August 5 – John Segrave is appointed to the custody of Berwick Castle, leaving him in charge with an English force of some 20,000 men. Robert, along with other nobles, gives his allegiance to Edward.
- August 31 – The Peace of Caltabellotta is signed between King Charles the Lame, King of Naples and King Frederick III of Sicily, ending the War of the Sicilian Vespers. The Kingdom of Sicily will pass to Angevin rule on Frederick's death, in return Charles pays a tribute of some 100,000 ounces of gold. Frederick hands over all his possessions in Calabria and releases Charles' son Philip I, prince of Taranto, from his prison in Cefalù.
- September 3 (1 Muharram 702 AH) – At the start of the new Muslim year 702 AH, Mamluk Sultan Al-Nasir Muhammad sends a fleet of 20 galleys) to Tripoli of Lebanon, where Mamluk forces led by Kahardash al-Zarraq al-Mansuri, begin a blockade and siege.
- September 26 (28 Muharram 702 AH) – Fall of Ruad: The Knights Templar, European Crusaders to the Holy Land, surrender their control of the island of Ruad (modern-day Arwad, off of the coast of Syria) to the Mamluk Sultanate. Hugh Dampierre negotiates a promise that the Europeans will be allowed safe conduct to a Christian-ruled land of their choice, but Knights are attacked as soon as they emerge from the garrison. Templar Grand Master Barthélemy de Quincy is killed in battle, all of the Syrian Christian bowmen and footsoldiers are executed, and the surviving Knights Templar are taken as prisoners of war and incarcerated in Cairo.
- September – Roger de Flor, Italian military adventurer and knight (condottiere), founds the Catalan Company group of mercenaries, with soldiers (Almogavars) jobless after the Treaty of Caltabellotta.

==== October–December ====
- October 4 – Andronikos II Palaiologos, Byzantine Emperor, signs a peace treaty with the Republic of Venice, ending the Byzantine–Venetian War (1296–1302). The Venetians return most of their conquests – but keep the islands of Kea, Santorini, Serifos and Amorgos – which are retained by the privateers who have captured them. Andronikos agrees to repay the Venetians for their losses sustained during the massacre of Venetian residents (see 1296).
- November 18 – Boniface VIII issues the papal bull Unam sanctam, which asserts the superiority of the papacy's spiritual power over secular rulers.
- December 2 – The coronation of Martha of Denmark, wife of Sweden's King Birger since 1298, as Queen consort of Sweden takes place in a ceremony at Söderköping.
- December 10 – The Inuigin Era (Kengen) begins in Japan during the reign after the coronation of Emperor Gonijo.
- December 31 – Theobald II of the House of Metz becomes the new Duke of Lorraine within the Holy Roman Empire after the death of his father, Frederick III.

==== Date unknown ====
- The Beijing Temple of Confucius is erected during the reign of Emperor Temür Khan (or "Chengzong") of the Chinese Yuan dynasty.

=== 1303 ===
==== January–March ====
- January 17 – A major earthquake strikes Byzantium and Constantinople (now Istanbul in Turkey). Byzantine Emperor Michael IX Palaiologos spreads the word that the former Patriarch of the Eastern Church, Athanasius I had given him a warning about the imminent wrath of God against the city.
- January 21 – John XII is forced to resign as Ecumenical Patriarch of Constantinople and leader of the Eastern Orthodox Church after the January 17 earthquake.
- January 28 – In India, the siege of Chittorgarh, capital of the Medapata Kingdom (now in the state of Rajasthan), begins as the Sultan of Delhi, Alauddin Khalji, seeks to acquire the territory of the Medapata Emperor, Ratnasimha.
- February 24 – Battle of Roslin: Scottish forces (some 8,000 men) led by John Comyn III "the Red" and Simon Fraser ambush and defeat an English scouting party under John Segrave at Roslin. During the battle, the Scots attack the English camp, capturing Segrave and several other nobles. But a second English brigade manages to rescue Segrave in a pitched battle. Later, the English army is again defeated, according to sources they lose between 28,000 and 30,000 men.
- March 17 – Joan II of the Anscarids becomes the Countess and ruler of Burgundy, a free state within the Holy Roman Empire (now the département of Jura in France), upon the death of her father Otto IV.

==== April–June ====
- April 4 – Battle of Arques: Flemish forces (some 10,000 men) led by William of Jülich ("the Younger") defeats a French army at Arques in Flanders. During the battle, the French cavalry (1,600 men) tries to break the Flemish infantry militia formations, but to no avail. Finally, the French withdraw to Saint-Omer, leaving 300 dead behind. Later, William receives a warm reception in Bruges as a liberator in May.
- April 20 – Pope Boniface VIII founds the University of Rome with the papal bull In Supremae praeminentia Dignitatis, as a Studium for ecclesiastical studies under his control, making it the first pontifical university.
- April 22 – Battle of Marj al-Saffar: Mamluk forces (some 20,000 men) under Sultan Al-Nasir Muhammad defeat a Mongol army and their Armenian allies led by Qutlugh-Shah, on the plain of Marj al-Saffar. After the battle, Al-Nasir enters Damascus and chases the Mongols as far as Al-Qaryatayn in Syria. He returns to Cairo in triumph through the Bab al-Nasr ("Victory Gate") with chained prisoners of war.
- May 16 – King Edward I of England assembles 7,500 troops at Roxburgh to prepare for a resumption of his campaign against the Kingdom of Scotland, to begin after concluding peace between England and France. In advance of the invasion, Edward orders that three pre-fabricated pontoon bridges be built and transported, in a fleet of 27 ships. After crossing into Scotland, Edward and his soldiers burns hamlet and towns, granges and granaries. Meanwhile, Richard Óg de Burgh, "the Red Earl" with forces from Ireland capture the castles of Rothesay and Inverkip.
- May 20 – Treaty of Paris: King Philip the Fair of France signs a peace treaty with Edward Longshanks, King of England. According to the terms of the treaty, Gascony is restored to England – as well as the cities of Bordeaux and Bayonne. In return, Edward swears allegiance to Philip as his vassal and agrees that Philipp's daughter, Isabella of France, be married to his son Edward of Caernarfon, until she is old enough.
- May 26 – Elizabeth Richeza, 14-year-old daughter of the late King Przemysl II of Poland, marries her father's former rival and the new King of Poland, King Wenceslaus II of Bohemia. The marriage takes place at the Prague Cathedral in Bohemia (now in the Czech Republic, and Elizabeth is crowned as Queen Consort of Bohemia.
- May 31 – Pope Boniface VIII orders the nullification of the election of Wenceslaus as King of Hungary, and declares that Károly Róbert, son of the late Hungarian king Charles Martel of Anjou, is the rightful claimant to the throne. The Pope also threatens Wenceslaus with excommunication from the Roman Catholic Church if Wenceslaus continues to style himself "King of Hungary". The decision causes a breakdown of Hungary between supporters of Wenceslaus and supporters of Károly.
- June 18 – Scottish nobles Edmund Comyn and Simon Fraser lead an invasion from Dumfriesshire in Scotland, crossing the border into England at Cumberland and laying waste to Carlisle and its surrounding area.
- June 23 – Athanasius I returns to leadership of the Eastern Orthodox church in Byzantium, receiving recognition as the Ecumenical Patriarch of Constantinople almost 10 years of having been driven from that office.

==== July–September ====
- August 8 – 1303 Crete earthquake: An earthquake destroys the Lighthouse of Alexandria in Egypt, one of the Seven wonders of the World.
- August 26 – Siege of Chittorgarh: Delhi forces led by Sultan Alauddin Khalji capture the massive Chittor Fort in northern India, after an 8-month-long siege. Alauddin orders a general massacre of Chittor's population.
- August – The 17-year-old King Ferdinand the Summoned, supervised by his mother, Queen-Regent María de Molina, signs a peace treaty at Córdoba with Granada for three years. In return, Muhammad III renews his vassalage with Castile and pays the same tribute given as to his father, the late King Sancho the Brave. The strategic port city of Tarifa remains in Castilian hands.
- September 7 – Boniface VIII is imprisoned by Guillaume de Nogaret, French councillor and advisor, on behalf of Philip the Fair at his residence in Anagni. During the incident, Gregory Bicskei, archbishop of Esztergom, is killed. Boniface is for three days held in captivity, where he is beaten, tortured and nearly executed.
- September 16 – The Kagen era begins in Japan during the reign of the Emperor Gonijo.
- September 25 – 1303 Hongdong earthquake: An earthquake destroys the cities of Taiyuan and Pingyang, some 200,000 people are killed.
- September – Emperor Andronikos II Palaiologos, facing a possible siege of Constantinople by Ottoman-Turkish forces, seeks support from the European kingdoms. He makes Roger de Flor, Italian military adventurer and nobleman, an offer of service. Roger with his fleet and army (some 7,000 men), now known as the Catalan Company, departs from Messina with 36 ships (including 18 galleys), and arrives in Constantinople. He is adopted into the imperial family, Andronikos appoints him as grand duke (megas doux) and commander-in-chief of the Byzantine army and fleet.

==== October–December ====
- October 11 – Pope Boniface VIII dies while imprisoned at Anagni, after a pontificate of 8 years.
- October 22 – At the papal conclave in Rome to select a new Roman catholic Pontiff, Cardinal Nicolò Boccasini, Bishop of Ostia, is elected unanimously.
- October 27 – The coronation of Cardinal Boccasini as Pope Benedict XI, 194th pope of the Roman Catholic Church, is performed at St. Peter's Basilica by Cardinal Matteo Rosso Orsini.
- November 9 – Edward I Longshanks, King of England spends the winter at Dunfermline Abbey where he plans the attack on Stirling Castle. He stations an army in the field and operations continue throughout the winter. An English force (some 1,000 men) raids and plunder into Lennox as far as Drymen. Meanwhile, Lord John Botetourt raids Galloway in strength, with four bannerets (some 3,000 men).
- December 18 – Pope Benedict XI issues a mandate directing that the rights of Cardinal Jean Lemoine of France, to income from the dioceses of Bayeux and Amiens is to be protected while Lemoine is serving as papal legate.

=== 1304 ===
==== January – March ====
- January 11 – Messengers from King Edward of England arrive at Kinclaven Castle in Scotland to discuss peace with Scottish noble John Comyn.
- January 18 – In France, King Philip the Fair issues a mandate at Toulouse to halt the threat of a civil war, declaring that "For the good of our realm... we expressly forbid and most strictly prohibit wars, battles, homicides, the burning of towns or houses, assaults or attacks on peasants or those who plow, or doing anything similar to our vassals and subjects, regardless of status or condition, in any place, or in any part of the realm," and adds that "the rash transgressors of these statutes and inhibitions ought to be punished as disturbers of the peace, regardless of contrary custom, or rather corruption allegedly followed in any part of the said realm." The action comes after Philip's meeting with Franciscan friar Bernard Délicieux concerning the Dominican Inquisition, but the King stops short of halting the Inquisition entirely despite Delicieux's claim that there had not been a single heretic among all the Albigensians for many years.
- January 31 – Cardinal Nicolò Albertini de Prato is dispatched by Pope Benedict XI as the papal legate to oversee negotiation of peace between Tuscany, Romagna and the Marca Trevigiana.
- February 9 – War of Scottish Independence: Scottish nobles led by Robert the Bruce and John Comyn ("John the Red"), negotiate a peace treaty with King Edward I of England ("Edward Longshanks"). His terms are accepted, and the Scots submit to English rule. In return, they are granted life and liberty under their old laws and freedom from the forfeiture of their lands. A few prominent nobles are singled out for temporary banishment – among them John de Soules, guardian of Scotland, who is exiled to France. No terms are offered to William Wallace, Edward's most wanted enemy, who remains defiantly at large despite every effort of Edward to capture him.
- February 20 – Battle of Happrew: Scottish rebels led by William Wallace and Simon Fraser fight guerilla warfare against King Edward I of England. They defend themselves against a vanguard of English knights at Peebles, in the Scottish Borders. During the skirmish, the Scots are defeated and routed. Wallace and Fraser narrowly escape being captured.
- March 17 – Cardinal Albertini, the papal legate and peacemaker, enters Florence and is granted special powers by the government to facilitate his mission.
- March 23 – John I of Arborea, nicknamed "Chiano" and the ruler of western Sardinia as Judge of Arborea dies. He is succeeded by his sons Marianus III and Andrew

==== April – June ====
- April 1 – Count Albert I of Gorizia dies and is succeeded by his son Henry III.
- May 11 – Mahmud Ghazan, Mongol ruler of the Ilkhanate in the Middle East, dies and is succeeded by his brother Öljaitü Qaghan.
- June 5 – Abu Said Uthman I, Zenata Berber ruler of Tlemcen, dies and is succeeded by his son Abu Zayyan I.

==== July – September ====
- July 7 – Pope Benedict XI dies after an 8-month pontificate in Perugia.
- July 17 – A papal conclave, with 15 of the 19 living Roman Catholic cardinals, assembles at Perugia to elect a successor to Pope Benedict XI, who had died 10 days earlier. The conclave will be deadlocked for almost a year until Clement V receives the necessary two-thirds majority on June 5, 1305.
- July 24 – Siege of Stirling Castle: King Edward I of England captures the Scottish rebel stronghold at Stirling. The castle is for four months bombarded by twelve siege engines. During the siege, Edward orders his engineer, Master James of St. George, to build a massive engine called the Warwolf. Eventually, William Oliphant and his garrison surrender.
- July 27 – Andrey III Aleksandorovich, Kievan nobleman and Grand Prince of the Principality of Grand Duchy of Vladimir dies and is succeeded by his uncle Mikhail of Tver.
- August 8 – Treaty of Torrellas: The 18-year-old King Ferdinand IV of Castile signs a peace with King James II of Aragon ("James the Just"). In the terms, James agrees to restore the Kingdom of Murcia to Castile, except for Alicante, Elche, Orihuela, and lands north of the Segura River. In return for extensive patrimony, Prince Alfonso de la Cerda renounces his claim to the Castilian throne, ending a conflict that has disturbed the tranquility of the realm for nearly 30 years.
- August 11 – Battle of Zierikzee: A French-Hollandic fleet (some 50 galleys) supported by Genoese ships led by Admiral Rainier I defeats the Flemish ships near Zierikzee. During the battle, the Flemish commander Guy of Namur is captured, and his fleet (which consists of Flemish, English, Hanseatic, Spanish and Swedish ships) is annihilated.
- August 18 – Battle of Mons-en-Pévèle: French forces (some 13,000 men) led by King Philip IV of France ("Philip the Fair") defeat a Flemish army at Mons-en-Pévèle. During the battle, the Flemish, led by William of Jülich "the Younger") are forced to retreat to Lille. William is killed, and the French lose the Oriflamme ("Golden Flame"), the battle standard of Philip.
- August
  - Flemish forces under John II, Duke of Brabant ("the Peaceful") and Guy of Dampierre occupy Zeeland and Holland. In response, John II, Count of Holland, count of Holland, recovers the Zeeland and Holland, and restores his authority, but dies on August 22.
  - Sultan Alauddin Khalji orders a second invasion of Gujarat, which results in the annexation of the Kingdom of Vaghela into the Delhi Sultanate.
- September 2 – Brinolfo Algotsson, the Swedish Catholic Bishop of Skara is rewarded for his financial assistance in rebuilding Norway's Stavanger Cathedral, as a Norwegian ship arrives at Skara. He is presented a holy relic, what is purported to be a thorn from the crown of thorns worn by Jesus Christ at the Crucifixion. In a solemn profession led by Algotsson, the thorn is transported to the Skara Cathedral.
- September 22 – Thomas of Corbridge, England's powerful Archbishop of York, dies after a little more than four years in office. The office is vacant for several months, and leads to the resignation of Lord Chancellor William Greenfield to become the new Bishop.

==== October – December ====
- October 5 – Treaty of Treviso: After a dispute over salt works, the Italian commune of Padua and Venice sign a peace treaty, ending the Salt War. Venice establishes a salt monopoly and sells salt rights to merchants.
- October 24 – Ottoman-Turkish forces led by Sultan Osman I conquer the ancient city of Ephesus from the Byzantine Empire, massacring and deporting its native population.
- November 12 – King Edward I summons the English Parliament for the first time in more than two years.
- December 4 – William Greenfield, Lord Chancellor of England, is elected Archbishop of York by the church leaders in the diocese, then sets off for Rome to receive the consecration of the office by the Pope.
- December 29 – William de Hamilton is nominated Lord Chancellor of England, the highest office at the time for a member of Parliament, by King Edward I. He takes office on January 16.
- December – Roger de Flor, Italian nobleman and adventurer, settles with the Catalan Company in Gallipoli and other towns in the southern part of Thrace and visits Constantinople to demand payment for his forces. He lives at the expense of the local population and uses the city as a base for his marauding raids in the surrounding area.

==== By place ====
====== Byzantine Empire ======
- Battle of Skafida: Emperor Michael IX Palaiologos sends a Byzantine expeditionary force (some 10,000 men) to halt the expansion of the Bulgarians in Thrace. The two armies meet near Sozopol on the Bulgarian Black Sea Coast. During the battle, the Bulgarian army led by Tsar Theodore Svetoslav is defeated and routed. The Byzantines, infatuated with the chase of the retreating enemy, crowd on a bridge – which possibly is sabotaged, and break down. The Bulgarians capture many Byzantine soldiers and some nobles are held for ransom. Svetoslav secures his territorial gains and stabilizes himself as the sole ruler of the Bulgarian Empire (until 1322).
- The Byzantines lose the island of Chios, in the Aegean Sea, to the Genoese under Admiral Benedetto I Zaccaria. He establishes an autonomous lordship and justifies the act to the Byzantine court as necessary to prevent the island from being captured by Turkish pirates. Benedetto is granted the island as a fief for a period of 10 years.

====== Asia ======
- Ambassadors from the Mongol rulers of Central Asia and the Yuan Dynasty announce to Toqta Khan, Mongol ruler of the Golden Horde, their general peace proposal. Toqta accepts the supremacy of Emperor Temür Khan and all yams (postal relays) and commercial networks across the Mongol khanates reopen. In response, Toqta solidifies his rule upon the Rus' princes, who pledge allegiance to him at an assembly in Pereyaslavl.

==== By topic ====
====== Architecture ======
- The construction of Ypres Cloth Hall, in Ypres (modern Belgium), is completed.

=== 1305 ===
==== January – March ====
- January 12 – The marriage of Bastam, the 8-year-old son (and eldest child) of the Ikhanate ruler of Iran, Oljaitu Khan, to Uljay Qutlugh Khatun, the 7-year-old daughter and the only surviving child of the previous Ikhanate, the late Ghazan Khan, takes place in Tabriz. The betrothal of the two children had been arranged by Ghazan and Öljaitü on September 17, 1303.
- January 16 – William de Hamilton is formally invested as Lord Chancellor, the highest-ranking elected official at the time in England.
- January 23 – Henry II Kőszegi, the Ban of Slavonia, completes his conquest of Croatian territory in Požega and Valkó, and issues a charter of annexation from his encampment at Valkószentgyörgy.
- February 26 – In Spain, King James II of Aragon and King Ferdinand IV of Castile have a summit at the Monastery of Santa María de Huerta in Castile. Attending also from Castile are Ferdinand's uncle, Prince John; Juan Núñez II de Lara of the House of Lara; Ferdinand's cousin Juan Manuel; and Prince Afonso of Portugal.
- February 28 – The 52nd English Parliament assembles.
- March 19 – Amir Chupan, the Duke of Yi, is betrothed to Dowlandi Khatun, the daughter of Öljaitü.
- March 20 – King Edward dissolves the 52nd Parliament.
- March 25 – Juan Manuel of Castile is made Lord of Alarcón.

==== April – June ====
- April 30 – Byzantine Emperor Michael IX Palaiologos invites Roger de Flor, Italian nobleman and adventurer, to Adrianople and has him assassinated there. Along with de Flor, 300 horsemen and some 1,000 foot soldiers who accompanied him are killed. The plan is executed by Alan mercenaries, who at that time are enlisted in the Byzantine army. The murder of the commander of the Catalan Company does not have the expected results. Not only is the Company not disbanded, but its attacks on Byzantine territory becomes more severe. The period of destruction in Macedonia and Thrace after the murder of de Flor becomes known as the "Catalan Revenge".
- May 19 – In Spain, the Treaty of Elche is signed between King James II of Aragon and King Ferdinand IV of Castile to revise the borders set out nine months earlier in the Treaty of Torrellas.
- June 5 – Pope Clement V, formerly the Archbishop of Bordeaux, succeeds Pope Benedict XI as the 195th pontiff of the Catholic Church. He will reign until 1314.
- June 20 – Öljaitü, the new Mongol Ikhanate, marries Qutlughshah Khatun, daughter of the Kerait Emir Irinjin.
- June 21 – At 14 years old, Wenceslaus III becomes ruler of Hungary, Bohemia, and Poland upon the death at age 33 of his father, King Wenceslaus II.
- June 27 – In recognition of the marriage of his daughter to Öljaitü the Mongol Ikhanate, Mongol Irinjin is appointed Viceroy of Anatolia.

==== July – September ====
- July 10 – Battle of Apros: Byzantine forces (some 6,000 men) under Michael IX Palaiologos, consisting of a large contingent of Alans and Turcopoles (Christianized Turks), attack the Catalan Company near Apros. Michael orders a general cavalry charge, but the Turcopoles desert en bloc to the Catalans. During the battle, the Byzantines are defeated (with many losses from the crossbowmen) and Michael is injured but escapes the field.
- July 15 – King Edward of England summons a new Parliament, to assemble on September 15.
- August 3 – William Wallace, Scottish rebel leader and knight, is captured near Glasgow at Robroyston, by English troops led by John de Menteith. He is transported to London and led, crowned mockingly with laurel, in procession to Westminster Hall.
- August 23 – After a three-week trial at Westminster, William Wallace is convicted of treason and of atrocities against civilians in war. After the trial, he is dragged through the streets of Smithfield in London and hanged, drawn and quartered – strangled by hanging – but cut down while still alive, emasculated, disemboweled (with his bowels burned before him), beheaded, and then cut into four parts. Wallace's head is placed on a spike above the London Bridge, and his limbs are displayed separately, in Newcastle, Berwick, Stirling, and Perth.
- September 15 – King Edward I of England issues ordinances for the government of the Kingdom of Scotland. King Edward issues the first commission of Trailbaston – which empowers him to appoint judicial commissions to punish crimes (such as homicide, theft, arson, and rape) and certain trespasses. Edward adds also conspiracy to the list of presentments.
- September 19 – At Tabriz (now in Iran) Öljaitü the Mongol Ikhanate, receives the Mongol ambassador from Yuan dynasty China.

==== October – December ====
- October 9 – King Wenceslaus III marries Viola Elizabeth of Teschen, daughter of Duke Mieszko I, and abandons his claim to Hungary in favor of Otto III of Bavaria. Meanwhile, Wladyslaw II the Elbow-High, claimant to the Polish throne, begins conquering Polish territories.
- November 24 – In India, Mahalakadeva, King of Malwa, is killed while attempting to flee the invaders from the Delhi Sultanate. Ayn al-Mulk Multani takes control of the kingdom as the Sultanate's Governor of Malwa.
- December 8 – At Tabriz, the Mongol Ikhanate Öljaitü receives the ambassador sent by Toqta, Khan of the Golden Horde that rules territory comprising much of what is now Russia.
- December 20 – Battle of Amroha: Mongol forces (some 30,000 men) invade the Delhi Sultanate again in northern India. Sultan Alauddin Khalji dispatches a cavalry force led by Vizier Ghazi Malik, to repulse the Mongols. During the battle (somewhere in the Amroha district), the Delhi forces inflict a crushing defeat upon the invaders. Many Mongols are taken prisoner and incorporated into the Delhi army.

=== 1306 ===
==== January – March ====
- January 3 – Deshou Khan, the only son of Chinese Emperor Chengzong of the Yuan dynasty (Temür Khan) dies, leaving the Mongol Emperor without an heir.
- January 27 – The University of Orléans is created by a papal bull issued by Pope Clement V endowing the Orléans institutes in France with the title and privileges of a university.
- January 28 – After two hearings, Sunni Muslim theologian Ibn Taymiyyah is found innocent of charges of heresy by the Indian Qur'an scholar Safi al-Din al-Hindi. Taymiyyah is found guilty three months later by a panel of judges in the Mamluk state and imprisoned for four months.
- February 10 – Robert the Bruce murders John Comyn III, Scottish nobleman and political rival, before the high altar of the Greyfriars Church at Dumfries. Bruce and Comyn meet to discuss their differences at the church (without their swords). An argument between the two ensues, and Bruce draws his dagger in anger and stabs Comyn. He flees the church, telling his followers outside what has occurred. Roger de Kirkpatrick, cousin of Bruce, goes back inside and finishes off the seriously wounded Comyn. In response, Bruce is excommunicated by Pope Clement V.
- March 21 – In France, Hugh V, at the age of 11, becomes the new Duke of Burgundy upon the death of his father, Robert II.
- March 25 – Robert the Bruce is crowned king of Scotland by Bishop William de Lamberton at Scone, near Perth. Despite lacking the traditional coronation stone, diadem and scepter, all of which have transferred to London. During the ceremony, the Scottish nobles of Atholl, Lennox, Mar and Menteith are present – while the 18-year-old Elizabeth de Burgh is crowned queen of Scots. The coronation takes place in defiance of the English claims of suzerainty after King Edward I of England, strips John de Baliol of his crown as King of Scots.

==== April – June ====
- April 26 – French knight Amalric, Lord of Tyre, with the aid of the Knights Templar, stages a Coup d'état against his older brother Henry II, King of Cyprus. Although Henry remains the nominal king, he is confined at the Cypriot city of Strovolos, and Amalric assumes all of the King's powers. Amalric will be assassinated in 1310.
- May 5 – Charles the Lame, King of Naples, accuses Philip I of Piedmont and Isabella of Villehardouin of disloyalty, and deprives them of the right to rule the Principality of Achaea (located in southern Greece on the Peloponnese peninsula). King Charles awards Achaea to his son, Philip I, Prince of Taranto.
- May 13 – (29 Shawwal 705 AH) A Moorish Nasrid fleet sent by Sultan Sultan Muhammad III of the Emirate of Granada (now part of Spain) makes a surprise attack on Africa and captures Ceuta. Nasrid forces land in Ksar es-Seghir, Larache, and Asilah, occupying these Atlantic ports (→ Battle of the Strait). At the same time, Prince Uthman ibn Abi al-Ula of the Marinid Sultanate, leads a rebellion against Sultan Abu Yaqub Yusuf an-Nasr. He conquers a mountainous area in northern Morocco and allies himself with Granada.
- May 22 – Feast of the Swans: At Westminster Abbey King Edward I of England proclaims that all squires, who agree to march in an invasion of Scotland, will be knighted. After the feast, the King has two swans brought in and swears "before God and the swans" to avenge the murder of John III Comyn, Lord of Badenoch, the desecration of Greyfriars Church in Dumfries by Robert Bruce, and to fight the infidels in the Holy Land. The King knights his son, Prince Edward of Caernarfon. The Prince knights 266 other men. King Edward then gives his "Raise the Dragon" orders, proclaiming that no mercy is to be granted to Scotland, and all Scots taken in arms are to be executed without trial. Among the persons knighted, the King appoints Aymer de Valance, lieutenant for Scotland. Valence will make his base at Perth, along with Henry Percy and Robert Clifford, to organize an army.
- May 30 – The English Parliament meets at Westminster in a one-day session, on orders of King Edward I, a week after Whit Sunday and passes a five percent tax on "citizens and burgesses and communities of all the cities and boroughs of the realm and the tenants of our demesne."
- June 8 – After bringing the Flemish War to a victorious conclusion, King Philip IV of France orders the silver content of new livre coins to be raised back to the 1285 level of 3.96 grams of silver, and orders the devaluation of the coins of 1303, 1304 and 1305 to one-third of their face value. The economic decree leads to rioting.
- June 19 – Battle of Methven: Scottish forces (some 5,000 men) under Robert the Bruce are defeated by the English army at Methven. During the battle, the Scots are overwhelmed by a surprise attack on their camp. They are outnumbered, but Bruce manages to form a phalanx to break free. Finally, he is forced to retreat, leaving many of his followers dead or soon to be executed.
- June 23 – The Knights Hospitaller, led by Grand Master Foulques de Villaret, land with 600 men on the island of Rhodes, one of the Dodecanese Islands off of the coast of Byzantium, and begin a four-year long war to capture the fortified city of Rhodes (which will not fall until August 15, 1310).

==== July – September ====
- July 22 – The Great Exile of 1306: King Philip IV of France turns his attentions to Italian bankers and orders the Jews to be exiled in France. The Jewish quarter in Paris is cleared and goods are confiscated – to regain money spent on expanding the domains of Flanders and Gascony. Meanwhile, rumors of a secret initiation ceremony of the Knights Templar create distrust, and Philip – while being deeply in debt to the Order for loans from his war against England, uses this distrust for political and religious motivations against the Templars.
- August 4 – King Wenceslaus III of Bohemia is assassinated at the age of 16 after a reign of only 14 months, being stabbed to death at Olomouc (now in the Czech Republic), bringing an end to the Přemyslid dynasty. His sister Anne of Bohemia administers the nation until her husband Henry of Carinthia is elected as the new King of Bohemia by the Bohemian nobles.
- August 11 – Battle of Dalrigh: Robert the Bruce is defeated by rival Scottish forces (some 1,000 men) led by John the Lame of Argyll chieftain and uncle of John Comyn the Red of the Clan MacDougall at Dalrigh (known as "King's Field"). ("After the defeat which Robert Bruce experienced in Perthshire from Edward I, soon after his coronation at Scone, he was endeavoring to make his way toward the West Highlands with a few followers, when, on the 11th of August 1306, he was encountered at a place, since called Dalrigh (the King's field) near Tyndrum, on the border of Argyllshire, by that powerful chief, or rather potentate, Allaster or Alexander MacDougall of Argyll...") During the battle, Bruce himself narrowly escapes capture and takes with the remnants refuge in the mountains of Atholl (Scottish Highlands).
- September 13 – In Scotland, English forces under Edward of Caernarfon capture and sack Kildrummy Castle in Aberdeenshire. Edward takes Elizabeth de Burgh, Christina Bruce and Mary Bruce (sisters of Robert the Bruce), and Princess Marjorie Bruce (daughter of Bruce) as prisoners. He executes Nigel de Brus (younger brother of Bruce) for high treason, who is later hanged, drawn and quartered at Berwick.
- September 20 – The Knights Hospitaller, besieging on the island of Rhodes, capture the Feraklos Castle.
- September 29 – The Hatuna Games are played in Sweden. Duke's Eric Magnusson and Valdemar Magnusson, arrive at the estate of their brother, King Birger Magnusson, by Lake Malar. They are invited as guests at a feast, but during the night Birger and his wife, Martha of Denmark, are captured by the two brothers and are imprisoned in the dungeon at Nyköping Castle – while Eric and Valdemar jointly take over the Swedish throne.

==== October – December ====
- October 9 – Robert FitzWalter, 1st Baron FitzWalter is pardoned of all debts owed to King Edward I of England, in honor of his service in the war against the Scots.
- October 16 – In a ceremony at Prague, King Rudolf I of Bohemia marries Elizabeth Richeza, the widow of Rudolf's predecessor, King Wenceslaus II of Bohemia.
- October 23 – James Stewart, 5th High Steward of Scotland, after having been defeated in battle by King Edward of England, swears fealty to King Edward again at Lanercost Priory. To render his oath inviolable, Stewart's oath is taken upon the two crosses of Scotland most esteemed for their sanctity, the holy gospels and on various relics of saints. Stewart agrees to submit to instant excommunication if he should break his oath of allegiance to Edward.
- November 3 – From Lanercost Prior, King Edward of England summons Parliament to meet in Carlisle, starting on January 20, "to "treat of the ordering and settling of the land of Scotland."
- December 6 – The monetary policy of King Philip IV of France triggers a revolt in Paris. The provost's house is burned, and King Philip the Fair has to flee to the fortress of the Temple.

==== By location ====
- Winter – Robert the Bruce retires to the Isle of Rathlin with a small group of followers, including Bruce's brothers Edward, Thomas and Alexander, as well James Douglas, Niall mac Cailein and Malcolm II. He is welcomed by the Irish Bissett family and stays at Rathlin Castle (or "Bruce's Castle"). Robert reorganizes his resources and musters troops for the campaign in Scotland.

====== Asia ======
- Mongol invasion of India: Mongol forces invade the Delhi Sultanate, Sultan Alauddin Khalji sends an army under Malik Kafur to deal with the invaders and defeats them at the banks of the Ravi River. The Delhi army kills and captures many Mongols in their pursuit. Alauddin orders the survivors to be trampled under the feet of elephants.

==== By topic ====
====== Economy ======
- In London, a city ordinance decrees that heating with coal is forbidden when Parliament is in session (the ordinance is not particularly effective).

====== Religion ======
- Storkyrkan, the current cathedral of Stockholm, is consecrated by Birger Jarl Magnusson.

=== 1307 ===
==== January – March ====
- January 13 – (11th waxing of Tabodwe 668 ME, Burmese calendar) After a reign of almost 20 years, King Wareru, who founded the Martaban Kingdom in what is now southern Myanmar, is stabbed to death by two of his grandsons, Shin Gyi and Shin Nge, who were avenging the execution by Wareru (in 1296 of their father, Tarabya of Pegu. Hkun Law, younger brother of Wareru, becomes the new King of Martaban.
- January 18 – The Tokuji era begins in Japan in the fourth year of Kagen.
- February 9 – Battle of Loch Ryan: Thomas de Brus and Alexander de Brus sail with an invasion force of 1,000 men and 18 galleys, into the harbor at Loch Ryan. But they are defeated by rival Scots under Dungal MacDouall. During the attack, only two galleys escape and all the leaders are captured.
- February 10 – Temür Khan (or Chengzong), the sixth Great Khan of the Mongol Empire (as well as the Emperor Chengzong of Yuan-dynasty China) dies at the age of 41 after a reign of 12 years. He is succeeded by his nephew, Külüg Khan.
- February 17 – Eight days after their capture at Loch Ryan, Thomas de Brus, and Alexander de Brus, Reginald Crawford are all executed. Thomas and Alexander are taken to Carlisle, where hanged, drawn and quartered.
- March 23 – Fra Dolcino of Novara, Margaret of Trent and Longino da Bergamo, leaders of the New Apostles movement in Italy, are captured at Val Sesia and tried for heresy on orders of Pope Clement V. They will be executed on June 1.

==== April – June ====
- April 9 – King Edward I of England dismisses the Parliaments of Ireland. A new Parliament will not be assembled until February 9, 1310.
- April 14 – Persian historian Rashid al-Din Hamadani completes his comprehensive chronicle of Persian history, the Jami' al-tawarikh, inscribing the Persian calendar date "24th day of Farvardin 686"
- April 21 – Ralph Baldock, Bishop of London, becomes the new Lord Chancellor of England upon the death of William Hamilton, but serves for less than four months.
- April – Battle of Glen Trool: Scottish forces led by Robert the Bruce defeat the English army at Glen Trool, Galloway. During the battle, Robert gives the order to push down several boulders to ambush the English, who are approaching through a narrow glen (called the "Steps of Trool"). Scottish forces charge down an extremely steep 700-meter sloop, the narrowness of the defile prevents support from either the front or the rear. Without any room to maneuver, many of the English are killed and routed.
- May 10 – Battle of Loudoun Hill: Scottish forces under Robert the Bruce defeat the English army (some 3,000 men) at Loudoun Hill. During the battle, a frontal charge by the English knights led by Aymer de Valence is halted by Robert's spearmen militia, who effectively slaughtered them as they are on marshy ground. Aymer manages to escape the carnage and flees to the safety of Bothwell Castle. The battle marks the turning point in Robert's struggle to reclaim the independence of Scotland.
- May 13 – Abu Yaqub Yusuf an-Nasr, Marinid ruler of Morocco is assassinated.
- June 21 – The coronation of Külüg Khan as Khan of the Mongol Empire and as Emperor Wuzong of Yuan dynasty China, takes place in Khanbaliq in what is now Beijing.

==== July – September ====
- July 4 – Rudolf I, king of Bohemia, dies.
- July 7 – King Edward I of England, known as Edward Longshanks, dies at Burgh by Sands after a 34-year reign. He is succeeded by his son 23-year-old Edward II, who becomes new ruler of England. After his death Edward's body is embalmed and transported to Waltham Abbey in Essex. Here it lay unburied for several weeks so that people can come and see the body lying in state. After this, Edward is taken to Westminster Abbey for a proper burial on October 28.
- July 20 – King Edward II travels from London, after he is proclaimed king and continues north into Scotland, where he receives homage from his Scottish supporters at Dumfries.
- August 2 – In the first reorganization of the English government by the new King, Edward II, Gilbert Segrave replaces Ralph Baldock as Lord Chancellor
- August 4 – King Edward II abandons the campaign against Scotland and returns home. He recalls his friend and favourite, Piers Gaveston, who is in exile, and makes him Earl of Cornwall, before arranging his marriage to the wealthy 13-year-old Margaret de Clare.
- August 18 – On the question of whether a prayer to the English Bishop Thomas de Cantilupe led to the miracle of the resurrection of William Cragh the day after Cragh's execution by hanging on November 27, 1290, Cragh himself testifies before a papal commission at a hearing in Hereford. Of 38 miracles alleged to have been the result of intercession by Cantilupe, the papal commission finds 12 of them doubtful, but accepts another 26 and recommends canonization. Pope John XXII will formally canonize Bishop Cantilupe on April 17, 1320.
- August 20 – John de Benstede, the English Chancellor of the Exchequer since 1305 when he was appointed by the late King Edward I, is dismissed as by the new and replaced by John Sandale.
- August 22 – Walter Reynolds, Bishop of Worcester, becomes the new Lord High Treasurer for Edward II, replacing Walter Langton, Bishop of Coventry. The next day, Henry Ludgershall is made the new Chamberlain of the Exchequer.
- August 26 – After the restructuring of his government, King Edward II summons his first Parliament, directing members to be elected and to assemble at Northampton on October 13.
- September 5 – Pope Clement V issues a papal bull confirming that the island of Rhodes, now one of the Dodecanese islands of Greece, will be the property of the Knights Hospitaller.
- September 23 – A marriage contract is concluded between the Otto IV, Count of Burgundy and King Philip IV of France for the marriage of Otto's 11-year-old daughter Blanche to the King's 13-year-old son, Prince Charles. The marriage takes place on February 2, 1308, but will be annulled on May 19, 1322, shortly after Prince Charles assumes the throne as King Charles IV.

==== October – December ====
- October 13 – King Philip IV of France orders the arrest of all members of the Knights Templar in France. The Templars, together with their Grand Master Jacques de Molay, are imprisoned, interrogated, and tortured into confessing heresy. In Paris, the king's inquisitors torture some 140 Templars, most of whom eventually make confessions. Many are subjected to "fire torture": their legs are fastened in an iron frame and the soles of their feet are greased with fat or butter. Unable to withstand these tortures, many Templars eventually confess.
- November 17 – The Mongol General Bilarghu hosts the Armenian Kings Hethum II and Leo III at a banquet at his in castle at Anazarbus (now in ruins near the Turkish village of Dilekkaya). After the guests complete the banquet, Bilarghu massacres all of the Armenian royalty and nobles.
- November 18 – William Tell, Swiss mountain climber and marksman, shoots (according to legend) an apple off his son's head with a crossbow at Altdorf, Switzerland.
- November 22 – Following the example of France's King Philip the Fair, Pope Clement V issues a papal decree directing all monarchs of the Christian faith to arrest the Knights Templar and to confiscate their lands as property of the Church.
- December 10 – Theodoric IV, the ruler of the semi-independent states of Lusatia, Osterland and Thuringia, is murdered at Leipzig by Philip of Nassau. Theodoric is succeeded by Frederick the Brave as ruler of Thuringia and by Otto IV of Brandenburg as ruler of Lusatia. The areas are now part of eastern Germany.
- December 25 – On Christmas Day, the 3-day Battle of Slioch begins in Scotland, with King Robert the Bruce and his men turning back the forces of John Comyn.

==== By place ====
====== Europe ======
- Januli I da Corogna seizes the Aegean Island of Sifnos and becomes an autonomous lord, by renouncing his allegiance to the Knights Hospitaller.

====== Britain ======
- Spring – King Robert the Bruce, King of Scots crosses with a small force (some 600 men) from the Isle of Arran in the Firth of Clyde to his earldom of Carrick in Ayrshire. He attacks the English garrison at Turnberry Castle, plundering and destroying the stronghold. Meanwhile, The Black Douglas attacks the English garrison in Douglas Castle at Palm Sunday – while they are slaughtered during a church mass (known as the "Douglas Larder").

====== Asia ======
- Duwa Khan, Mongol ruler of the Chagatai Khanate, dies after a 25-year reign and is succeeded by his son Könchek (until 1308).

==== By topic ====
====== Cities and Towns ======
- The village of Heerle in North Brabant is proclaimed an independent parish (modern Netherlands).

=== 1308 ===
==== January – March ====
- January 25 – King Edward II marries the 13-year-old Isabella of France, daughter of King Philip IV of France ("Philip the Fair"). The marriage takes place at Boulogne and Edward leaves his friend and favourite, Piers Gaveston, as regent in his absence. Isabella's wardrobe indicates her wealth and style – she has dresses of silk, velvet, taffeta and cloth along with numerous furs; she has over 72 headdresses and coifs. Isabella brings with her two gold crowns, gold and silver dinnerware and 419 yards of linen. Meanwhile, Edward alienates the nobles by placing Gaveston in such a powerful position, who react by signing the Boulogne agreement on January 31.
- February 1 – Herman I the Tall Margrave of Brandenburg-Salzwedel (and co-ruler of Brandenburg with Otto IV), dies and is succeeded as Margrave by his son John V.
- February 25 – Edward II is crowned at Westminster Abbey under the guidance of Henry Woodlock, bishop of Winchester. During the ceremony, Piers Gaveston is given the honour of carrying the crown. At the banquet that followed, Edward spends more time with Gaveston than with his wife Isabella of France. Isabella's family, who have travelled with her from France, leave to report back to Philip IV of Edward's favouritism for Gaveston over Isabella. As part of the coronation, Edward swears an oath to uphold "the rightful laws and customs which the community of the realm shall have chosen".
- March 8 – King Denis of Portugal, "the Poet King", grants Póvoa de Varzim a charter, the Foral, giving royal lands to 54 families, who found a municipality known as Póvoa around Praça Velha.
- March 18 – Brothers Andrei Rurik and Lev II Rurik become the co-monarchs of Ruthenia (now part of Ukraine and Poland, with a capital at Lviv), upon the death of their father, King Yuri I of Galicia. The two brothers will reign until their deaths in 1323 at the Battle of Berestia against Mongol invaders.

==== April – June ====
- April 15 – Abu Hammu I becomes the new ruler of the Kingdom of Tlemcen after the death of his brother, Sultan Abu Zayyan I.
- May 1 – King Albrecht I of Germany, ruler of the Regnum Teutonicorum and King of the Romans within the Holy Roman Empire, is assassinated at Windisch in Switzerland by his nephew, John of Swabia, the day after the two had an argument at a banquet in Winterthur.
- May 23 – Battle of Inverurie: Scottish forces led by King Robert the Bruce defeat the rival Scots under John Comyn at Oldmeldrum. During the battle, Robert repulses a surprise attack on his camp, and counter-attacks the Scots of Clan Comyn. John flees to seek refuge at the English court and is well received by Edward II, who appoints him as Lord Warden of the Marches. Meanwhile, Robert orders his forces to burn the farms, houses and strongholds associated with Clan Cumming in north-east Scotland. The Earldom of Buchan will never again rise for Clan Cumming.
- June 25 – Piers Gaveston is exiled for the second time by the Parliament, due to possible corruption and exploited personal gains. As compensation for the loss of the Earldom of Cornwall, which is another condition of his exile, Gaveston is granted land worth 3,000 marks annually in Gascony. Further to this, he is appointed Lord Lieutenant of Ireland – so that a certain amount of honour can be maintained despite the humiliation of the exile. Gaveston is also threatened with ex-communication by Pope Clement V. Edward II accompanies him to Bristol, from where he sets sail for Ireland.
- June 28 – After 138 members of the Knights Templar were convicted of heresy on October 19, 1307, a trial is held for 54 Templars who testify before Pope Clement V, with most confessing to at least one charge.

==== July – September ====
- July 2 – Alauddin Khalji, Sultan of Delhi sets off from the Indian city of Delhi toward the Fort of Siwana (now in the Rajasthan state) to begin the siege of Siwana, which is completed in September.
- July 28 – Abu Thabit 'Amir dies and is succeeded by his brother Abu al-Rabi Sulayman as ruler of the Marinid Sultanate.
- July 30 – Chungseon of Goryeo becomes the King of Korea for the second time, after the death of his father, King Chungnyeol of Korea. Chungseon had ruled for a few months in 1298 during the illness of his father.
- August 11 – Pope Clement V grants the Knights Hospitaller permission to begin the Crusade of the Poor.
- August 12 – Pope Clement V publishes the papal bull Faciens Misericordiam ("The granting of forgiveness"), absolving the Knights Templar from charges of heresy and declaring that the Roman Catholic Church, rather than any individual nation, will be in charge of future charges against the Knights. On the same day, he issues the bull Regnans in coelis, summoning what will become the Council of Vienne in 1311.
- August 14 – King Ananta Malla of Nepal dies after a reign of 34 years, leaving the Himalayan Mountains kingdom without a monarch for five years.
- August 15 – The Knights Hospitaller complete the conquest of the Greek island of Rhodes after four years.
- August 20 – The Chinon Parchment is written by French Cardinal Berengar Fredol the Elder, summarizing the results of the investigations of Fredol and the two other Cardinals of their disposition of the Knights Templar charges. The parchment is then put in the Vatican Apostolic Archive and will remain undiscovered for almost seven centuries before being rediscovered by Barbara Frale.
- August 31 – (Tokuji 3, 15th day of the 8th month of Tokuji 3) Prince Morikuni becomes the ninth, and last, shogun of the Kamakura bakufu.
- September 10 – (Tokuji 3, 25th day of the 8th month) At the age of 11, Hanazono becomes the 95th Emperor of Japan upon the death of his cousin, the Emperor Go-Nijō. Emperor Hanazono will rule until 1348.
- September – Siege of Siwana: Delhi forces under Alauddin Khalji capture the Siwana fortress after a two-month siege. During the siege, Alauddin defiles the main water tank of Siwana (by a traitor) with cows' blood.

==== October – December ====
- October 5 – Guy II de la Roche, Duchy of Athens, dies at the age of 28, bringing an end to the de la Roche dynasty. He is succeeded by his cousin, Walter V, Count of Brienne.
- October 20 – The English Parliament begins its fourth session of the reign of King Edward II and meets at Westminster.
- November 10 – After the fall of the fortress of Siwana in India, Prince Sital Deva is ambushed while trying to flee to safety at Jalor. The soldiers decapitate Sital and present his head as a trophy to the Delhi Sultan, Alauddin.
- November 13 – The Teutonic Knights capture Gdańsk by treachery – while a Brandenburger force of 100 knights and 200 followers led by Heinrich von Plötzke and Günther von Schwarzburg lay siege to the city. The garrison of Gdańsk castle is too weak to defend itself against the Brandenburgers. Meanwhile, the Polish ruler of Gdańsk Pomerania, Władysław I Łokietek ("Wladyslaw the Elbow-High"), is unable to send reinforcements. The citizens call upon the Teutonic Knights for military help and offer to pay their costs. The arrival of the knights, lead the Brandenburgers to beat a hasty retreat. In an act of supreme treachery, the Teutonic Knights attack the city they have come to save. The houses of both Polish and German are burnt and destroyed. Many people are slaughtered without mercy, including women and children who have sought sanctuary in churches. Within a year, the German Crusaders occupy the whole of Eastern Pomerania and consolidate their power at the Baltic Sea.
- November 22 – The coronation of the Emperor Hanazono of Japan takes place at Edo.
- November 27
  - Henry VII Count of Luxemburg, is elected the new Holy Roman Emperor at Frankfurt. The election comes with the support of his brother Baldwin, Archbishop of Trier, who wins over most of the electors, in exchange for some substantial concessions. The only elector who does not support Henry of Luxemburg is Henry of Bohemia.
  - On the same day, Hungarian nobles formally elect the 20-year-old Charles Robert of Salerno as King of Hungary and Croatia in the Hungarian city of Pest (now part of Budapest). He becomes Charles I, but his rule remains nominal in most parts of the realm after he is crowned.
- December 16 – Tran Anh Tong becomes the new Emperor of Dai Viet (corresponding to northern Vietnam) upon the death of his father, Tran Nhan Tong.
- December 19 – Treaty of Alcalá de Henares: King Ferdinand IV of Castile and King James II of Aragon sign an alliance in the Monastery of Santa María de Huerta. Ferdinand agrees to join James in making war by sea and by land against Granada. He also promises to give up one-sixth of Granada to Aragon, and grants him the Province of Almería.
- December – King Władysław I Łokietek of Poland imprisons Jan Muskata, Bishop of Kraków. In response, Polish and German citizens revolt against his rule in Kraków (as in all Poland's cities at this time). Władysław in a delicate position responds with force and arrests the revolt's leaders. He ties them to horses and drags them through the city streets.

==== By place ====
====== Europe ======
- Sultan Mesud II, Seljuk vassal of the Mongol Ilkhanate, is murdered after a 5-year reign. During his rule, he exercises no real authority and becomes the last ruler. Ending the Sultanate of Rum after 230 years.
- King Philip IV of France purchases Hôtel de Nesle in Paris and builds one of the earliest indoor tennis courts there.

====== Scotland ======
- Summer – Battle of the Pass of Brander: Scottish forces under King Robert the Bruce defeat the rival Scots of the Clan MacDougall, kinsmen of John Comyn the Red . During the battle, Robert orders to bypass the Pass of Brander. He sends James Douglas the Black) with a party of archers to take up positions above the pass to avoid an ambush. Robert breaks through the MacDougalls blockade and defeats them at the Bridge of Awe. The MacDougalls are chased westwards across the River Awe to Dunstaffnage. The Lord of Argyll surrenders and does homage to Robert.
- The harrying of Buchan takes places as Scottish forces under Edward Bruce devastate the lands of John Comyn, and his supporters following the victory at Inverurie. Meanwhile, Robert the Bruce takes Aberdeen, conquers Galloway and threatens northern Scotland.

====== Asia ======
- Summer – Delhi forces led by Malik Kafur invade the Yadava Kingdom under King Ramachandra, who shelters the fugitive Vaghela king Karna. Ramachandra sues for peace and acknowledges Delhi's overlordship.

==== By topic ====
====== Literature ======
- Dante Alighieri begins work on his Divine Comedy, comprising Inferno, Purgatorio and Paradiso. It is one of the most influential works of the European Middle Ages (approximate date).

=== 1309 ===
==== January – March ====
- January 6 – The coronation of Henry of Luxemburg as "King of the Romans", the person first-in-line to succeed the Holy Roman Emperor, takes place at Aachen (now in Germany). He will become the Emperor in 1312.
- February 2 – At Avignon, Pope Clement V begins the investigation and posthumous trial of the late Pope Boniface VIII, who was accused of heresy and sodomy after his death in 1303, in papers circulated by Guillaume de Nogaret.
- February 15 – King Denis of Portugal grants the Magna Charta Privilegioum, charter for Portugal's first university, now the University of Coimbra. Joseph M. M. Hermans and Marc Nelissen, Charters of Foundation and Early Documents of the Universities of the Coimbra Group (Leuven University Press, 2005) p. 38.
- February 24 – In Spain, King Ferdinand IV of Castile agrees to assist the neighboring Kingdom of Aragon (led by King, King Jaume II, to wage war against the Islamic Emirate of Granada.
- March 9 – Pope Clement V officially transfers the headquarters of the Roman Catholic Pontiff from Rome to the French city of Avignon, his residence and at this time part of the Kingdom of Arles, starting the Avignon Papacy. Since 1305, the papal court had been at Poitiers, and the move is justified by violence in Rome. The papal seat becomes part of the Holy Roman Empire, and its absence from Rome is referred to as the "Babylonian captivity of the Papacy".
- March 14 – (1 Shawwal 708 AH) Sultan Muhammad III is deposed during a palace coup after a 7-year reign, and is replaced by his half-brother Abu al-Juyush Nasr, as ruler of the Emirate of Granada. Muhammad III is spared and allowed to live in Almuñécar, but his vizier, Abu Abdallah ibn al-Hakim, is killed.

==== April – June ====
- April 24 – Spanish kings James II of Aragon and Ferdinand IV of Castile persuade Pope Clement V to grant the papal bull Indesinentis cure, authorizing them approval and church financial support for a crusade to rid the Iberian peninsula of Islam, as well as to conquer Corsica and Sardinia. The two monarchs fail to mention their collaboration with the Muslim Marinid Empire, and use the papal bull to plan a blockade of the Strait of Gibraltar with their combined fleet of 40 warships on their mission to expel the Saracen forces from Spain.
- April 29 – Pope Clement V issues the papal bull Prioribus decanis granting King Ferdinand IV 1/10th of clergy taxes collected in Castile, in order to finance the war against Granada.
- April – After his ascent to the throne, the Emir Nasr ad-Din Muhammad of Granada sends envoys to the Marinid court at Fez, in Morocco.
- May 5 – Robert the Wise becomes the new King of Naples upon the death of his father, Charles the Lame.
- May 12 – Marinid Sultan Abu al-Rabi Sulayman launches an attack on Ceuta. He concludes an alliance with King James II of Castile, and concedes commercial benefits to Castilian merchants. Abu al-Rabi also sends 1,000 measures of wheat to Aragon. A few months later, Marinid forces, without Castilian support, occupy Ceuta and expel Saracen forces from Morocco.
- June 15 – The second coronation of Charles I as King of Hungary takes place at Székesfehérvár after a first attempt in 1301 was not recognized.

==== July – September ====
- July 3 – Portugal joins forces with the kingdoms of Castile and Aragon in their attack on Gibraltar.
- July 18 – King James II of Aragon and his navy depart from Valencia on their expedition to begin the Siege of Almería.
- July 21 – The north African territory of Ceuta, controlled by the Emirate of Granada, is conquered by a fleet of ships, led by Eimeric de Bellveí, from the Kingdom of Aragon.
- July 30 – (21 Safar 709 A.H.) Siege of Algeciras: Castilian forces led by Ferdinand IV "the Summoned"") begin the siege of Algeciras, capital of the Emirate of Granada. King Denis I of Portugal ("the Poet King") sends a contingent of 700 knights to support the siege. He provides Ferdinand, in accordance with his friendship, a loan of 16,600 silver marks.
- August 11 – Siege of Almería: Aragonese forces (some 12,000 men) under King James II of Aragon ("James the Just") land on the coast of Almería and begin blockading the city with his fleet. His forces include siege engines such as mangonels and trebuchets. James orders multiple unsuccessful assaults on the city and is forced (due to a shortage of supplies) to make a truce in December.
- August 15 – Conquest of Rhodes: The Byzantine garrison of the city of Rhodes surrenders to the Crusader forces of the Knights Hospitaller under Grand Master Foulques de Villaret – completing their conquest of Rhodes. The knights establish their headquarters on the island and rename themselves as the Knights of Rhodes.
- August 23 – A relief force from the Emirate of Granada attempts to drive out the Kingdom of Aragon forces at Almeria, but loses thousands of men.
- September 12 – Siege of Gibraltar: Castilian forces under Juan Núñez II de Lara and Alonso Pérez de Guzmán besiege and conquer the Saracen fortress at Gibraltar, which had been held by them for nearly 600 years (since the year 711). During the siege, the port is blockaded. Ferdinand IV of Castile orders repairs of the damaged city walls.

==== October – December ====
- October 1 – In Italy, the Archbishop of Milan, Cassone della Torre, is imprisoned by troops sent by his cousin Guido della Torre to attack the archbishop's palace.
- October 18
  - At Avignon, Pope Clement V signs a mandate consenting "for any persons who wanted to proceed against the memory of Boniface VIII to proceed" and sends it to the Bishop of Paris for the posthumous trial of Boniface for heresy.
  - King Edward II summons a council to meet at York, but several nobles (the earls of Lancaster, Lincoln, Warwick, Oxford and Arundel) refuse to attend due to Piers Gaveston's attendance. Since he returned from exile, Gaveston tries to alienate the nobles from the king.
- October 20 – In what is now central Myanmar, the coronation of Thihathu as the monarch of the Myinsaing Kingdom takes place.
- October 22 – The trial of the Knights Templar arrested in England begins and will continue for the next five months, ending on March 18, 1310.
- October 29 – Archbishop Cassone della Torre of Milan is exiled to Bologna by his cousin Guido, who is later excommunicated.
- October 31 – In India, Alauddin Khalji, Sultan of Delhi, orders General Malik Kafur to invade the Kakatiya kingdom, ruled by Prataparudra, and to besiege its capital, Warangal (now in India's Telangana state).
- October – About 500 knights led by John of Castile, Lord of Valencia de Campos, uncle of King James II of Castile, desert the Castilian encampment during the Siege of Algeciras because they are not getting paid and because one-sixth of Granada will be ceded to the Kingdom of Aragon. King Ferdinand of Aragon continues the siege.
- November 4 – Pope Clement V declares that Knights Hospitaller will not be sent to the Holy Land and Jerusalem, and that they will be limited to defending the Mediterranean Sea including Cyprus and Rhodes.
- November 13 – After a layover in Masudspur, the Delhi Sultanate Army of General Kafur resumes its march toward Warangal, stopping at Sultanpur on November 19, at Khandar on December 5 and at Nikanth on December 27.
- November 19 – Pope Clement V reverses the excommunication of Flemish hero Willem van Saeftinghe and grants him absolution, but requires him to join the Knights Hospitaller in their crusade at the island of Rhodes.
- December 18 – In Spain, three months after the September 19 death of Alonso Pérez de Guzmán, Fernando Ponce de León is made the new ruler of Marchena, as well as Bornos, Espera, Rota and Chipiona by King Ferdinand IV of Castile.

==== By place ====
====== England ======
- Alnwick Castle in Northumberland is bought by the House of Percy, later Earls of Northumberland.

====== Cities and Towns ======
- The village of Lukáčovce in Slovakia first appears in the historical records.

== Births ==
1300

- January 21 – Roger Clifford, English nobleman and knight (d. 1322)
- January 28 – Chūgan Engetsu, Japanese poet and writer (d. 1375)
- February 1 – Bolko II of Ziębice, Polish nobleman and knight (d. 1341)
- April 4 – Constance of Aragon, Aragonese princess (infanta) (d. 1327)
- June 1 – Thomas of Brotherton, English nobleman and prince (d. 1338)
- September 27 – Adolf of the Rhine, German nobleman (d. 1327)
- October 9 – John de Grey, English nobleman and knight (d. 1359)
- December 22 – Khutughtu Khan Kusala, Mongol emperor (d. 1329)
- Charles d'Artois, Neapolitan nobleman, knight and chancellor (d. 1346)
- Dionigi di Borgo San Sepolcro, Italian bishop and theologian (d. 1342)
- Gerard III, Dutch nobleman, knight, bailiff and rebel leader (d. 1358)
- Guillaume de Harsigny, French doctor and court physician (d. 1393)
- Guillaume de Machaut, French priest, poet and composer (d. 1377)
- Immanuel Bonfils, French mathematician and astronomer (d. 1377)
- Jakov of Serres, Serbian scholar, hierarch and translator (d. 1365)
- Jeanne de Clisson, French noblewoman and privateer (d. 1359)
- Joanna of Pfirt, German noblewoman (House of Habsburg) (d. 1351)
- Johannes Tauler, German preacher, mystic and theologian (d. 1361)
- John III, Brabantian nobleman and knight (House of Reginar) (d. 1355)
- John Sheppey, English administrator, treasurer and bishop (d. 1360)
- Jordan of Quedlinburg, German preacher, hermit and writer (d. 1380)
- Richard FitzRalph, Norman-Irish archbishop and theologian (d. 1360)
- Simon Locard (or Lockhart), Scottish landowner and knight (d. 1371)
- Thomas Bradwardine, English archbishop and theologian (d. 1349)

1301

- February 6 – Henry Percy, English nobleman, governor and knight (d. 1352)
- June 19 – Morikuni, Japanese prince, shogun and puppet ruler (d. 1333)
- July 23 – Otto I ("Otto the Merry"), Austrian nobleman and co-ruler (d. 1339)
- August 5 – Edmund of Woodstock, English nobleman and prince (d. 1330)
- September 24 – Ralph de Stafford, English nobleman and knight (d. 1372)
- October 4 – Thomas de Monthermer, English nobleman and knight (d. 1340)
- October 7 – Aleksandr Mikhailovich, Russian Grand Prince (d. 1339)
- unknown dates
  - Ingeborg of Norway, Norwegian princess and de facto ruler (d. 1361)
  - Nitta Yoshisada, Japanese nobleman, general and samurai (d. 1338)
  - Ni Zan, Chinese nobleman, painter, musician and tea master (d. 1374)
  - Rudolf II, German nobleman and knight (House of Zähringen) (d. 1352)

1302

- November 30 – Andrew Corsini, Italian prelate and bishop (d. 1374)
- December 7 – Azzone Visconti, Italian nobleman and knight (d. 1339)
- Fang Congyi, Chinese Daoist priest and landscape painter (d. 1393)
- Hōjō Sadayuki, Japanese nobleman, governor and samurai (d. 1333)
- Konoe Tsunetada, Japanese nobleman (kugyō) and regent (d. 1352)
- Shihabuddeen Ahmed Koya, Indian Grand Mufti and writer (d. 1374)
- Tai Situ Changchub Gyaltsen, Tibetan ruler and politician (d. 1364)

1303

- May 19 – Saw Zein (or Binnya Ran De), Burmese ruler (d. 1330)
- July 12 – Hugh de Courtenay, English nobleman and knight (d. 1377)
- Bridget of Sweden (or Birgitta), Swedish nun and mystic (d. 1373)
- Catherine II, Latin empress consort, regent and co-ruler (d. 1346)
- Henry Ferrers, English nobleman, constable and knight (d. 1343)
- Hōjō Shigetoki, Japanese nobleman (rensho) and official (d. 1333)
- Marie of Évreux, French noblewoman (House of Capet) (d. 1335)
- Willem IV of Horne, Dutch nobleman, diplomat and knight (d. 1343)

1304

- January 9 – Hōjō Takatoki, Japanese nobleman and regent (d. 1333)
- February 16 – Tugh Temür (or Wenzong), Mongol emperor (d. 1332)
- February 24 – Ibn Battuta, Moroccan scholar and explorer (d. 1369)
- May 2 – Margaret Mortimer, Anglo-Norman noblewoman (d. 1337)
- April 9 – Venturino of Bergamo, Italian Dominican friar and preacher (d. 1346)
- June 6 – Francesco Albergotti, Italian nobleman and jurist (d. 1376)
- July 20 – Francesco Petrarca, Italian historian and poet (d. 1374)
- October 4 – John Beauchamp, English peer and knight (d. 1343)
- October 17
  - Eleanor de Bohun, English noblewoman (d. 1363)
  - James Butler, Irish nobleman and knight (d. 1338)
- Engelbert III, German archbishop (House of La Marck) (d. 1368)
- Gerard II de Lisle, English nobleman, peer and knight (d. 1360)
- Ibn al-Shatir, Syrian astronomer, engineer and writer (d. 1375)
- Joan of Valois, French noblewoman and princess (d. 1363)
- John of Aragon, Aragonese archbishop and patriarch (d. 1334)
- Lodewijk Heyligen, Flemish monk and music theorist (d. 1361)
- Magnus I ("Magnus the Pious"), German nobleman and knight (d. 1369)
- Marcus of Viterbo, Italian cardinal and papal legate (d. 1369)
- Marie of Luxemburg, queen of France and Navarre (d. 1324)
- Walram of Jülich, Dutch nobleman and archbishop (d. 1349)
- Walter VI, French nobleman, knight and constable (d. 1356)
- William de Clinton, English nobleman and admiral (d. 1354)

1305

- June 2 – Abu Sa'id Bahadur (or "Abu Sa'id"), Mongol ruler (d. 1335)
- August 18 – Ashikaga Takauji, Japanese general (shogun) (d. 1358)
- September 25 – Al-Mahdi Ali, Yemeni imam and politician (d. 1372)
- September 29 – Henry XIV, German nobleman and co-ruler (d. 1339)
- October 28 – Minbyauk Thihapate, Burmese ruler of Sagaing (d. 1364)
- November 5 – Robert Clifford, English nobleman and knight (d. 1344)
- Agnes of Bohemia, Bohemian princess (House of Přemyslid) (d. 1337)
- Arnoul d'Audrehem, French nobleman, knight and marshal (d. 1370)
- Elizabeth of Poland, queen consort of Hungary and Croatia (d. 1380)
- Gao Ming (or "Gao Zecheng"), Chinese poet and playwright (d. 1370)
- Isabella of Aragon (or "Elisabeth"), German queen consort (d. 1330)
- Khatsun Namkha Lekpa Gyaltsen, Tibetan religious leader (d. 1343)
- Konoe Mototsugu, Japanese nobleman (kugyō) and regent (d. 1354)
- Louis the Junker, German nobleman, knight and co-ruler (d. 1345)
- Peter of Aragon, Spanish prince (infante) and counsellor (d. 1381)
- Peter Thomas, French monk, archbishop and theologian (d. 1366)
- Philippe de Cabassoles, French bishop and papal legate (d. 1372)
- Shiba Takatsune, Japanese general and warlord (daimyo) (d. 1367)
- Thomas of Frignano, Italian cardinal and Minister General (d. 1381)
- Yi Ja-heung, Korean nobleman, official and Grand Prince (d. 1371)

1306

- August 8 – Rudolf the Blind, Duke of Bavaria (d. 1353)
- Ashikaga Tadayoshi, Japanese nobleman, samurai and general (d. 1352)
- Isabella of Brienne, Latin noblewoman (suo jure) and claimant (d. 1360)
- Sasaki Takauji, Japanese bureaucrat, warrior, poet and writer (d. 1373)

1307

- unknown dates
  - Alessandra Giliani, Italian female anatomist and scientist (d. 1326)
  - William II (or IV), Count of Hainaut, Dutch nobleman (House of Avesnes) (d. 1345)

1308

- August 12 – Moriyoshi, Japanese nobleman and prince (d. 1335)
- Andrea Orcagna, Italian painter, sculptor and architect (d. 1368)
- Gaston II, French nobleman and knight (House of Foix) (d. 1343)
- Joan III of Burgundy, French noblewoman and princess (d. 1347)
- Joguk (or "Borjigin Jintong"), queen consort of Goryeo (d. 1325)
- Longchenpa, Tibetan Buddhist scholar-yogi and writer (d. 1364)

1309

- March 25 – Robert de Ferrers, English nobleman and knight (d. 1350)
- June 9 – Rupert I, German nobleman and count palatine (d. 1390)
- December 6 – Humphrey de Bohun, English nobleman (d. 1361)
- probable – Aldona of Lithuania (or "Anna"), queen consort of Poland (d. 1339)
- Conrad of Megenberg, German scholar and scientist (d. 1374)

== Deaths ==
1300

- January 14 – Isabella of Lusignan, French noblewoman (b. 1224)
- February 19 – Munio of Zamora, Spanish friar and bishop (b. 1237)
- July 18 – Gerard Segarelli, Italian founder of the Apostolic Brethren
- September 24 – Edmund, 2nd Earl of Cornwall, English nobleman (b. 1249)
- September 29 – Juliana FitzGerald, Lady of Thomond, Norman noblewoman (b. 1263)
- December 12 – Bartolo da San Gimignano, Italian priest (b. 1228)
- Albert III, Margrave of Brandenburg-Salzwedel, German nobleman, knight and co-ruler (House of Ascania)
- Albertus de Chiavari, Italian priest, Master General and philosopher
- Berengaria of Castile, Lady of Guadalajara, Spanish noblewoman and princess (b. 1253)
- Demetrios Pepagomenos, Byzantine physician, scientist and writer
- Geoffrey de Mowbray, Scottish nobleman, knight and Chief Justiciar
- Guido Cavalcanti, Italian poet and friend of Dante Alighieri (b. 1250)
- Güneri of Karaman, Turkish nobleman (bey) (House of Karamanid)
- Herman VIII, Margrave of Baden-Pforzheim, German nobleman and co-ruler (House of Zähringen)
- Jeanne de Montfort de Chambéon, Swiss noblewoman and regent
- Kangan Giin, Japanese Buddhist scholar and Zen Master (b. 1217)
- Thomas de Somerville, Scottish nobleman and rebel leader (b. 1245)
- Trần Hưng Đạo, Vietnamese Grand Prince and statesman (b. 1228)
- Guillaume de Nangis, French monk, chronicler and historian (b. 1250)

1301

- January 14 – Andrew III ("Andrew the Venetian"), king of Hungary (b. 1265)
- February 19 – Pietro Gerra, Italian cleric, archbishop and patriarch
- February 20 – Asukai Gayū, Japanese nobleman and poet (b. 1241)
- March 21 – Guillaume de Champvent, Swiss nobleman and bishop
- May 7 – Hōjō Akitoki, Japanese military leader and poet (b. 1248)
- August 22 – Giacomo Bianconi, Italian priest and scholar (b. 1220)
- September 3 – Alberto I, Italian nobleman and Chief magistrate
- November 19 – Johann III, Polish chaplain, bishop and diplomat
- unknown dates
  - Blasco I d'Alagona ("Blasc the Elder"), Aragonese nobleman and captain
  - "False Margaret", Norwegian noblewoman and pretender (b. 1260)

1302

- January 2 – Henry I, Lord of Mecklenburg, German nobleman and co-ruler (b. 1230)
- January 19 – Al-Hakim I, Abbasid ruler (caliph) of Cairo (b. 1247)
- January 26 – Godfrey Giffard, English Lord Chancellor and bishop
- February 1 – Andrea dei Conti, Italian priest and mystic (b. 1240)
- February 10 – Gerald Le Marescal, Irish archdeacon and bishop
- March 3 – Roger-Bernard III, Count of Foix, French nobleman and knight (b. 1243)
- March 9 – Richard Fitzalan, 8th Earl of Arundel, English nobleman and knight (b. 1267)
- March 20 – Ralph Walpole, English cleric, archdeacon and bishop
- April 8 – Muhammad II ("al-Faqih"), Nasrid ruler of Granada (b. 1235)
- April 9 – Constance of Sicily, queen and regent of Aragon (b. 1249)
- May 2 – Blanche of Artois, queen consort and regent of Navarre (b. 1248)
- June 30 – Ingeborg Birgersdotter, Swedish noblewoman (b. 1253)
- July 11 (Battle of the Golden Spurs):
  - Godfrey of Brabant, Dutch nobleman and knight
  - Guy I of Clermont, French nobleman and knight
  - Jacques de Châtillon, French governor and knight
  - John I de Trie, French knight and trouvère (b. 1225)
  - John I of Ponthieu, French nobleman and knight
  - John II of Brienne, French nobleman and knight
  - Pierre Flotte, French knight, lawyer and chancellor
  - Raoul II of Clermont, French nobleman and knight
  - Robert II, Count of Artois, French nobleman and seneschal (b. 1250)
  - Simon de Melun, French knight and Marshal (b. 1250)
- September 6 – John St. John, English knight and seneschal
- September 18 – Eudokia Palaiologina, empress of Trebizond
- September 26 – Barthélemy de Quincy, French Grand Master
- October 29 – Matthew of Aquasparta, Italian Minister General
- November 17 – Gertrude the Great, German mystic (b. 1256)
- December 2 – Audun Hugleiksson, Norwegian knight (b. 1240)
- December 13 – Adolf II of Waldeck, German nobleman and prince-bishop
- December 26 – Valdemar Birgersson, king of Sweden (b. 1239)
- December 29 – Vitslav II, Prince of Rügen, Danish nobleman, knight and prince
- December 31 – Frederick III, Duke of Lorraine, German nobleman and knight
- Balian of Ibelin, Cypriot nobleman and seneschal (b. 1240)
- Dietrich of Apolda, German monk, hagiographer and writer
- Gerardo Bianchi, Italian churchman, cardinal and diplomat
- Godfrey Giffard, English chancellor and bishop (b. 1235)
- Henry III, Count of Bar, French nobleman and knight (b. 1259)
- Henry le Walleis, English advisor, mayor and politician
- Hu Sanxing, Chinese historian and politician (b. 1230)
- Ibn Daqiq al-'Id, Egyptian scholar and writer (b. 1228)
- John Comyn II, Scottish nobleman, knight and regent
- John de Sècheville, English philosopher and scientist
- Lotterio Filangieri, Italo-Norman nobleman and knight
- Louis I, Swiss nobleman and knight (House of Savoy)
- Maghinardo Pagani, Italian nobleman and statesman
- William of March, English Lord Treasurer and bishop

1303

- March 4
  - Daniel of Moscow, Russian nobleman and prince (b. 1261)
  - Theodora Palaiologina, Byzantine empress consort (b. 1240)
- March 17 – Otto IV, French nobleman and co-ruler (House of Ivrea)
- May 19 – Ivo of Kermartin, French priest, judge and saint (b. 1253)
- July 8 – Procopius of Ustyug, German merchant and wonderworker
- August 8 – Henry of Castile (the Senator), Spanish prince (b. 1230)
- August 9 – Thomas Maule, Scottish nobleman, captain and knight
- August 25 – Ninshō, Japanese monk, disciple and priest (b. 1217)
- September 7 – Gregory Bicskei, Hungarian prelate and archbishop
- October 11 – Boniface VIII, pope of the Catholic Church (b. 1230)
- October 27 – Beatrice of Castile, queen consort of Portugal (b. 1242)
- November 1 – Hugh XIII of Lusignan, French nobleman (b. 1259)
- December 9 – Richard Gravesend, English archdeacon and bishop
- Drakpa Odzer, Tibetan monk, abbot and Imperial Preceptor (b. 1246)
- Elizabeth of Sicily, queen consort of Hungary and Croatia (b. 1261)
- Erik Knudsen Skarsholm, Danish nobleman and knight (b. 1235)
- Hajib Shakarbar, Indian scholar, poet, writer and mystic (b. 1213)
- Ibn Abd al-Malik, Almohad historian, biographer and writer (b. 1237)
- John of St. Amand, French pharmacist and philosopher (b. 1230)
- Otto VI (the Short), German nobleman and co-ruler (b. 1255)

1304

- January 13 – Ichijō Uchisane, Japanese nobleman (b. 1276)
- February 14 – Guy of Ibelin, Outremer nobleman (House of Ibelin)
- March 6 – Fujiwara no Kimiko, Japanese empress consort (b. 1232)
- March 7 – Bartolomeo I della Scala, Italian nobleman and knight
- March 23 – John I ("Chiano"), Sardinian ruler (Judge of Arborea)
- March 26 – Wigbold von Holte, German archbishop and diplomat
- April 1 – Albert I, Austrian nobleman, knight and co-ruler (b. 1240)
- April 11 – Maud de Lacy, Norman noblewoman (suo jure) (b. 1230)
- April 27 – Pedro Armengol, Spanish nobleman and priest (b. 1238)
- May 11 – Ghazan Khan, Mongol ruler of the Ilkhanate (b. 1271)
- May 23 – Jehan de Lescurel, French composer-poet and writer
- June 1 – Giovanni Pelingotto, Italian Third order Franciscan and hermit (b. 1240)
- June 5 – Abu Said Uthman I, Zenata Berber ruler of Tlemcen
- July 7 – Benedict XI, pope of the Catholic Church (b. 1240)
- July 17 – Edmund Mortimer, English nobleman (b. 1251)
- July 27 – Andrey III, Kievan nobleman and Grand Prince
- August 10 – Martin of Dacia, Danish theologian (b. 1240)
- August 16 – John III, Dutch nobleman and knight (b. 1249)
- August 17 – Go-Fukakusa, Japanese emperor (b. 1243)
- August 18 – William of Jülich, Flemish nobleman (b. 1275)
- August 22 – John II, Dutch nobleman and knight (b. 1247)
- September 22 – Thomas of Corbridge, English archbishop
- September 27 – John de Warenne, English nobleman (b. 1231)
- September 28 – Elisabeth of Kalisz, Polish noblewoman (b. 1259)
- September 29 – Agnes of Brandenburg, Danish queen (b. 1257)
- December 5 – John of Pontoise, English archdeacon and bishop
- December 23 – Matilda of Habsburg, German co-ruler (b. 1253)
- Fernando Rodríguez de Castro, Spanish nobleman and knight
- Henry I, German nobleman and knight (House of Schaumburg)
- Henry II of Rodez, French nobleman and troubadour (b. 1236)
- João Afonso Telo, Portuguese nobleman, knight and diplomat
- Peter of Auvergne, French philosopher, theologian and writer
- Robert de Brus, Scoto-Norman nobleman and knight (b. 1243)
- Wang Yun, Chinese official, politician, poet and writer (b. 1228)

1305

- January 17 – Roger of Lauria, Italian nobleman and admiral (b. 1245)
- March 1 – Blanche of France, French princess and duchess (b. 1278)
- March 7 – Guy of Dampierre, French nobleman and knight (b. 1226)
- April 2 – Joan I of Navarre, French queen consort and regent (b. 1273)
- April 10 – Joachim Piccolomini, Italian monk and altar server (b. 1258)
- April 30 – Roger de Flor, Italian nobleman and adventurer (b. 1267)
- May 17 – Hōjō Tokimura, Japanese nobleman (rensho) (b. 1242)
- June 21 – Wenceslaus II, king of Bohemia and Poland (b. 1271)
- August 23 – William Wallace, Scottish rebel leader and knight
- August 26 – Walter of Winterburn, English cardinal and writer
- September 4 – Matteo Rosso Orsini, Italian cardinal (b. 1230)
- September 10 – Nicholas of Tolentino, Italian friar and mystic
- October 4
  - Dietrich VII, German nobleman and knight (b. 1256)
  - Kameyama, Japanese emperor and priest (b. 1249)
- October 9 – Robert de Pontigny, French abbot and cardinal
- November 11 – Otto I, German nobleman and knight (b. 1262)
- November 16 – Albertino Morosini, Venetian nobleman and governor
- November 18 – John II, French nobleman and knight (b. 1239)
- November 24 – Mahalakadeva, ruler of India's Malwa Kingdom (killed in battle)
- Guillaume de Villaret, French knight and Grand Master (b. 1235)
- John I, Piedmontese nobleman (House of Aleramici) (b. 1275)
- John II van Sierck (or "Zyrick"), Dutch archdeacon and bishop
- Qian Xuan (or "Shun Ju"), Chinese official and painter (b. 1235)

1306

- February 10 – John Comyn the Red, Scottish nobleman (b. 1274)
- March – Araniko ("Anige"), Nepalese court architect and painter (b. 1245)
- March 21 – Robert II, French nobleman (House of Burgundy) (b. 1248).
- May 5 – Constantine Palaiologos, Byzantine prince and general (b. 1261)
- August 4 – Wenceslaus III, king of Hungary, Croatia and Poland (b. 1289)
- September 12 – An Hyang, Korean scholar and philosopher (b. 1243)
- September 21 – Wonbi Hong, Korean noblewoman and royal consort
- September 22 – John of Paris, French scholar, theologian and writer
- November 7 – John of Strathbogie, Scottish nobleman and Justiciar
- December 6 – Roger Bigod, English nobleman, knight and Marshal
- December 12 – Conrad of Offida, Italian monk and preacher (b. 1241)
- December 25 – Jacopone da Todi, Italian monk and mystic (b. 1230)

1307

- January 13 – Wareru, founder of the Martaban Kingdom, assassinated (b. 1253)
- February 10 – Temür Khan (or Chengzong), Mongol emperor
- February 17 – executed:
  - Alexander de Brus (or Bruse), Scottish nobleman (b. 1285)
  - Reginald Crawford, Scottish nobleman, knight and sheriff
  - Thomas de Brus (or Bruse), Scottish nobleman and Dean of Glasgow (b. 1284)
- April 23 – Joan of Acre (or Johanna), English princess (b. 1272)
- May 13 – Abu Yaqub Yusuf an-Nasr, Marinid ruler of Morocco
- July 4 – Rudolf I, German nobleman, knight and king (b. 1282)
- July 7 – Edward I ("Longshanks"), king of England (b. 1239)
- September 21 – Thomas Bitton (or Bytton), English bishop His brother was William of Bitton II, Bishop of Bath from 1267 to 1274.
- October 11 – Catherine I, Latin empress consort (b. 1274)
- November 23 – Diether III, German archbishop (b. 1250)

1308

- January 30 – Margaret of Tyre, Outremer noblewoman (b. 1244)
- February 1 – Herman the Tall, German nobleman (b. 1275)
- March 18 – Yuri I of Galicia, king of Ruthenia (House of Rurik)
- April 5
  - Ivan Kőszegi, Hungarian nobleman and palatine (b. 1245)
  - Reginald de Grey, English nobleman and knight (b. 1240)
- May 1 – Albert I, German nobleman, pretender and king (b. 1255)
- May 22 – Amadeus II, Burgundian nobleman (House of Geneva)
- July 4 – Eberhard I, German nobleman (House of La Marck)
- July 28 – Abu Thabit 'Amir, Marinid ruler of Morocco (b. 1284)
- July 30 – Chungnyeol, Korean ruler (House of Wang) (b. 1236)
- August 12 – Edmund Stafford, English nobleman and Peerage
- August 18 – Clare of Montefalco, Italian nun and abbess (b. 1268)
- September 4 – Margaret of Burgundy, queen of Sicily (b. 1250)
- September 10 – Go-Nijō, Japanese emperor (b. 1285)
- October 5 – Guy II, Latin nobleman (House de la Roche) (b. 1280)
- October 10 – Patrick IV de Dunbar, Scottish nobleman (b. 1242)
- November 8 – John Duns Scotus, Scottish priest and philosopher
- December 16 – Tran Nhan Tong, Vietnamese emperor (b. 1258)
- December 21 – Henry I, Landgrave of Hesse (Henry the Child), German nobleman (b. 1244)

1309

- January 4 – Angela of Foligno, Italian nun, mystic and writer (b. 1248)
- February 9 – Nanpo Shōmyō, Japanese monk and priest (b. 1235)
- March 7 – Lovato Lovati, Italian scholar, judge and writer (b. 1241)
- April 10 (probable) – Elisabeth von Rapperswil, Swiss noblewoman (b. 1251)
- May 5 – King Charles II "the Lame" of Naples), son of Charles I of Anjou (b. 1254)
- May 19 – Agostino Novello, Italian priest and prior general (b. 1240)
- July 13 – John I, Dutch nobleman and bishop (House of Nassau)
- July 16 – James Stewart, Scottish nobleman and knight (b. 1260)
- August 10 – Giovanni Boccamazza, Italian cardinal and archbishop
- September 19 – Alonso Pérez de Guzmán, Spanish nobleman (b. 1256)
- October 6 – Frederick VII, German nobleman (House of Hohenzollern)
- October 18 – Tettsū Gikai, Japanese monk and Zen Master (b. 1219)
