= 1302 =

1302 in various calendars
- Gregorian calendar: 1302; MCCCII
- Ab urbe condita: 2055
- Armenian calendar: 751; ԹՎ ՉԾԱ
- Assyrian calendar: 6052
- Balinese saka calendar: 1223–1224
- Bengali calendar: 708–709
- Berber calendar: 2252
- English Regnal year: 30 Edw. 1 – 31 Edw. 1
- Buddhist calendar: 1846
- Burmese calendar: 664
- Byzantine calendar: 6810–6811
- Chinese calendar: 辛丑年 (Metal Ox); 3999 or 3792 — to — 壬寅年 (Water Tiger); 4000 or 3793
- Coptic calendar: 1018–1019
- Discordian calendar: 2468
- Ethiopian calendar: 1294–1295
- Hebrew calendar: 5062–5063
- Hindu calendars
- Vikram Samvat: 1358–1359
- Shaka Samvat: 1223–1224
- Kali Yuga: 4402–4403
- Holocene calendar: 11302
- Igbo calendar: 302–303
- Iranian calendar: 680–681
- Islamic calendar: 701–702
- Japanese calendar: Shōan 4 / Kengen 1 (乾元元年)
- Javanese calendar: 1213–1214
- Julian calendar: 1302; MCCCII
- Korean calendar: 3635
- Minguo calendar: 610 before ROC 民前610年
- Nanakshahi calendar: −166
- Thai solar calendar: 1844–1845
- Tibetan calendar: ལྕགས་མོ་གླང་ལོ་ (female Iron-Ox); 1428 or 1047 or 275 — to — ཆུ་ཕོ་སྟག་ལོ་ (male Water-Tiger); 1429 or 1048 or 276

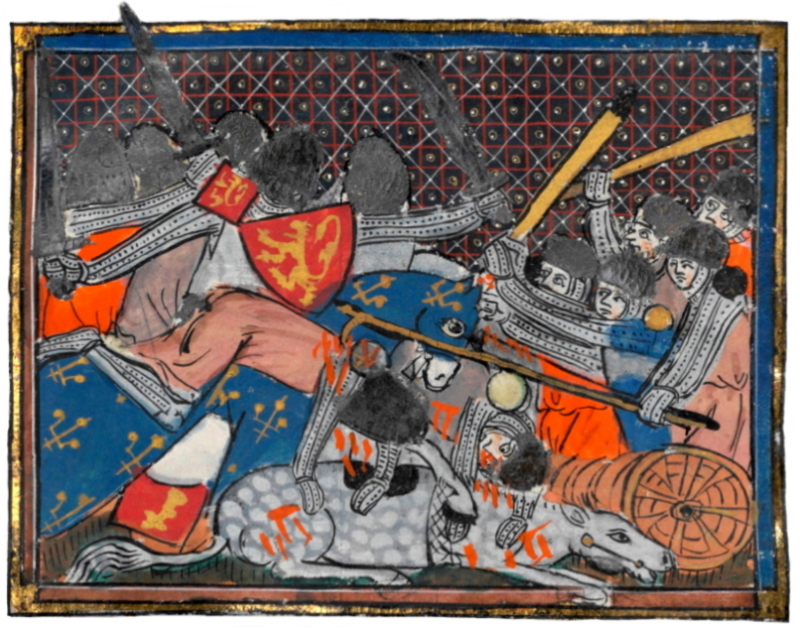
Depiction of Battle of the Golden Spurs, from the Grandes Chroniques de France.

Year 1302 (MCCCII) was a common year starting on Monday of the Julian calendar.

== Events ==
=== January–March ===
- January 2 – In Germany, Henry II becomes the ruler of the independent nation of Mecklenburg (encompassing the modern-day northeastern German state of Mecklenburg-Vorpommern) upon the death of his father, Henry the Pilgrim. Henry II had served as regent from 1290 to 1298 during Henry the Pilgrim's pilgrimage to the Holy Land, and had continued most of the administration of Mecklenburg after the return of his 68-year-old father.
- January 20 – In Egypt, Al-Mustakfi I becomes the new Muslim Abbasid Caliph of Cairo, leader of Islam within the Mamluk Sultanate, upon the death of his father, the Caliph Al-Hakim I.
- January 23 – King Ferdinand IV of the Spanish Kingdom of Castile, having recently reached the age of majority at age 16, marries 12-year-old Princess Constance, the only daughter of King Dinis of Portugal, in a ceremony at Valladolid.
- January 26 – At the suggestion of France, and pursuant to the treaty signed between England and France at Asnières, King Edward I of England ("Edward Longshanks") and the Scottish nobles led by Robert the Bruce agree to a nine-month peace treaty at Linlithgow, to last until St. Andrew's Day, November 30, 1302.
- February 8 – Yesün Temür becomes the Jinong (crown prince) of the Mongol Empire upon the death of his father Gammala, with authority over the Mongolian steppe north of the Gobi Desert. Yesün Temür will become the Emperor of China's Yuan dynasty in 1323 and reign for almost five years.
- February 10 – The papal bull Ausculta Fili is delivered to Philip the Fair, King of France, but Robert II, Count of Artois, snatches the document from Jacques de Normans, the emissary of Pope Boniface VIII and burns the paper in a fire.
- February 19 – The Italian artist Cimabue completes construction of the image of John the Evangelist, a major portion of the mosaic Christ Enthroned, in the Pisa Cathedral, after 94 days. Cimabue dies shortly afterward, and the full mosaic will not be completed until 1320.
- March 3 – Upon the death of Roger-Bernard III, Count of Foix, who had founded the Co-principality of Andorra in 1278, Roger's son Count Gaston continues as the new French administrator on behalf of King Philip of France. The holder of the title Count of Foix will continue to be the French representative in Andorra, with almost 200 years of unbroken rule, until the death of Gaston IV in 1472.
- March 4 – After learning of the rejection of the papal bull by King Philip of France, Pope Boniface VIII sends Cardinal Jean Lemoine to inform King Philip of the Pope's plans for an ecclesiastical council to control the appointment of French clergy.
- March – Robert the Bruce, the future King of Scotland marries as his second wife the 13-year-old Elizabeth de Burgh at Writtle in Essex. She is the daughter of Richard Óg de Burgh ("the Red Earl"), a powerful Irish nobleman and close friend of King Edward I of England.

=== April–June ===
- April 8 (8 Shaban 701 AH) – Sultan Muhammad II dies after a 29-year reign and is succeeded by his son Muhammad III as ruler of Granada. Within two weeks of his accession, he sends a Nasrid army under Hammu ibn Abd al-Haqq to seize Bedmar and other neighboring strongholds from Castile. Nasrid forces also attack Jódar, northeast of Bedmar, and recapture Quesada. Meanwhile, Muhammad contains friendly relations with King James II ("James the Just").
- April 10 – The first meeting of the Estates General in France is convened King Philip IV ("Philip the Fair") at the Notre-Dame in Paris. During the assembly, all three classes – the French nobles, clergy, and commons – discuss the conflict between Philip and Pope Boniface VIII over the papal legate, Bernard Saisset – who is accused to raise a rebellion of Occitan independence, associated with Navarre, under the banner of the County of Foix.
- April 12 – Ghazan of the Mongol Empire's Ilkhanate division sends a letter to Pope Boniface and announces preparations for a new campaign against the Mamluk Sultanate.
- April 22 – In modern-day Turkey, Byzantine Emperor Michael IX Palaiologos launches a military campaign against Turkish forces who have been conducting raids, and marches from Constantinople. His army travels southward as far as Magnesia ad Maeander (the ruins of which are now near the town of Ortaklar in what is now Turkey's Aydin Province). Palaiologos seeks to directly confront the Turkish forces, but is dissuaded by his generals. In the meantime, the Turks resume their raids, isolating Michael at Magnesia. His army is dissolved without a battle, as the local forces are left behind to defend their homes. The Alans (Byzantine mercenaries) too leave, to rejoin their families in Thrace. Michael is forced to withdraw by the sea, followed by another wave of refugees.
- May 17 – At the age of 12, Eleanor of Anjou, daughter of King Charles II of Naples, marries King Frederick III of Sicily.
- May 18 – Flemish militia kill 2,000 French soldiers in the course of the Matins of Bruges, after Pieter de Coninck and Jan Breydel call on soldiers to kill all of the French occupiers of the city in Flanders. The French Governor of Flanders, Jacques de Châtillon, escapes with a handful of soldiers while disguised as a priest. He arrives in Paris to bring the news of the massacre to King Philip the Fair, who sends an army to capture the city.
- June 12 – The Baltic Sea town of Wesenberg in Danish Estonia (modern-day Rakvere) receives municipal self-government under the Hanseatic League doctrine of Lübeck law.
- June 14 – Matteo I Visconti, Lord of Milan (Signore di Milano), the semi-independent Italian region within the Holy Roman Empire, is deposed by Guido della Torre, but will return in 1311.

=== July–September ===
- July 11 – The Battle of the Golden Spurs takes place as France retaliates against Flanders for the May 18 Matins of Bruges massacre. Flemish forces led by William of Jülich ("William the Younger") and Pieter de Coninck defeat the French army (some 9,000 men) at Kortrijk in Flanders. The cavalry charges of the French prove unable to defeat the untrained Flemish infantry militia, consisting mainly of members of the craft guilds. Many French nobles (some 500 knights) are killed, like the commander Robert II of Artois, and forced to retreat.
- July 27 – Battle of Bapheus: To counter the Turkish threat at Nicomedia, Emperor Andronikos II Palaiologos sends a Byzantine force (some 2,000 men) to cross over the Bosporus to relieve the city. On the plain, Turkish forces (some 5,000 light cavalry) led by Sultan Osman I defeat the Byzantines, who are forced to withdraw to Nicomedia. After the battle, Andronikos loses control of the countryside of Bithynia, withdrawing to the forts. Meanwhile, Turkish forces capture Byzantine settlements, such as the coastal city of Gemlik.
- August 5 – John Segrave is appointed to the custody of Berwick Castle, leaving him in charge with an English force of some 20,000 men. Robert, along with other nobles, gives his allegiance to Edward.
- August 31 – The Peace of Caltabellotta is signed between King Charles the Lame, King of Naples and King Frederick III of Sicily, ending the War of the Sicilian Vespers. The Kingdom of Sicily will pass to Angevin rule on Frederick's death, in return Charles pays a tribute of some 100,000 ounces of gold. Frederick hands over all his possessions in Calabria and releases Charles' son Philip I, prince of Taranto, from his prison in Cefalù.
- September 3 (1 Muharram 702 AH) – At the start of the new Muslim year 702 AH, Mamluk Sultan Al-Nasir Muhammad sends a fleet of 20 galleys) to Tripoli of Lebanon, where Mamluk forces led by Kahardash al-Zarraq al-Mansuri, begin a blockade and siege.
- September 26 (28 Muharram 702 AH) – Fall of Ruad: The Knights Templar, European Crusaders to the Holy Land, surrender their control of the island of Ruad (modern-day Arwad, off of the coast of Syria) to the Mamluk Sultanate. Hugh Dampierre negotiates a promise that the Europeans will be allowed safe conduct to a Christian-ruled land of their choice, but Knights are attacked as soon as they emerge from the garrison. Templar Grand Master Barthélemy de Quincy is killed in battle, all of the Syrian Christian bowmen and footsoldiers are executed, and the surviving Knights Templar are taken as prisoners of war and incarcerated in Cairo.
- September – Roger de Flor, Italian military adventurer and knight (condottiere), founds the Catalan Company group of mercenaries, with soldiers (Almogavars) jobless after the Treaty of Caltabellotta.

=== October–December ===
- October 4 – Andronikos II Palaiologos, Byzantine Emperor, signs a peace treaty with the Republic of Venice, ending the Byzantine–Venetian War (1296–1302). The Venetians return most of their conquests – but keep the islands of Kea, Santorini, Serifos and Amorgos – which are retained by the privateers who have captured them. Andronikos agrees to repay the Venetians for their losses sustained during the massacre of Venetian residents (see 1296).
- November 18 – Boniface VIII issues the papal bull Unam sanctam, which asserts the superiority of the papacy's spiritual power over secular rulers.
- December 2 – The coronation of Martha of Denmark, wife of Sweden's King Birger since 1298, as Queen consort of Sweden takes place in a ceremony at Söderköping.
- December 10 – The Inuigin Era (Kengen) begins in Japan during the reign after the coronation of Emperor Gonijo.
- December 31 – Theobald II of the House of Metz becomes the new Duke of Lorraine within the Holy Roman Empire after the death of his father, Frederick III.

=== Date unknown ===
- The Beijing Temple of Confucius is erected during the reign of Emperor Temür Khan (or "Chengzong") of the Chinese Yuan dynasty.

== Births ==
- November 30 – Andrew Corsini, Italian prelate and bishop (d. 1374)
- December 7 – Azzone Visconti, Italian nobleman and knight (d. 1339)
- Fang Congyi, Chinese Daoist priest and landscape painter (d. 1393)
- Hōjō Sadayuki, Japanese nobleman, governor and samurai (d. 1333)
- Konoe Tsunetada, Japanese nobleman (kugyō) and regent (d. 1352)
- Shihabuddeen Ahmed Koya, Indian Grand Mufti and writer (d. 1374)
- Tai Situ Changchub Gyaltsen, Tibetan ruler and politician (d. 1364)

== Deaths ==
- January 2 – Henry I, Lord of Mecklenburg, German nobleman and co-ruler (b. 1230)
- January 19 – Al-Hakim I, Abbasid ruler (caliph) of Cairo (b. 1247)
- January 26 – Godfrey Giffard, English Lord Chancellor and bishop
- February 1 – Andrea dei Conti, Italian priest and mystic (b. 1240)
- February 10 – Gerald Le Marescal, Irish archdeacon and bishop
- March 3 – Roger-Bernard III, Count of Foix, French nobleman and knight (b. 1243)
- March 9 – Richard Fitzalan, 8th Earl of Arundel, English nobleman and knight (b. 1267)
- March 20 – Ralph Walpole, English cleric, archdeacon and bishop
- April 8 – Muhammad II ("al-Faqih"), Nasrid ruler of Granada (b. 1235)
- April 9 – Constance II of Sicily, queen and regent of Aragon (b. 1249)
- May 2 – Blanche of Artois, queen consort and regent of Navarre (b. 1248)
- June 30 – Ingeborg Birgersdotter, Swedish noblewoman (b. 1253)
- July 11 (Battle of the Golden Spurs):
  - Godfrey of Brabant, Dutch nobleman and knight
  - Guy I of Clermont, French nobleman and knight
  - Jacques de Châtillon, French governor and knight
  - John I de Trie, French knight and trouvère (b. 1225)
  - John I of Ponthieu, French nobleman and knight
  - John II of Brienne, French nobleman and knight
  - Pierre Flotte, French knight, lawyer and chancellor
  - Raoul II of Clermont, French nobleman and knight
  - Count Robert II of Artois, French nobleman and seneschal (b. 1250)
  - Simon de Melun, French knight and Marshal (b. 1250)
- September 6 – John St. John, English knight and seneschal
- September 18 – Eudokia Palaiologina, empress of Trebizond
- September 26 – Barthélemy de Quincy, French Grand Master
- October 29 – Matthew of Aquasparta, Italian Minister General
- November 17 – Gertrude the Great, German mystic (b. 1256)
- December 2 – Audun Hugleiksson, Norwegian knight (b. 1240)
- December 13 – Adolf II of Waldeck, German nobleman and prince-bishop
- December 26 – Valdemar Birgersson, king of Sweden (b. 1239)
- December 29 – Vitslav II, Prince of Rügen, Danish nobleman, knight and prince
- December 31 – Frederick III, Duke of Lorraine, German nobleman and knight
- Balian of Ibelin, Cypriot nobleman and seneschal (b. 1240)
- Dietrich of Apolda, German monk, hagiographer and writer
- Gerardo Bianchi, Italian churchman, cardinal and diplomat
- Godfrey Giffard, English chancellor and bishop (b. 1235)
- Henry III, Count of Bar, French nobleman and knight (b. 1259)
- Henry le Walleis, English advisor, mayor and politician
- Hu Sanxing, Chinese historian and politician (b. 1230)
- Ibn Daqiq al-'Id, Egyptian scholar and writer (b. 1228)
- John Comyn II, Scottish nobleman, knight and regent
- John de Sècheville, English philosopher and scientist
- Lotterio Filangieri, Italo-Norman nobleman and knight
- Louis I, Swiss nobleman and knight (House of Savoy)
- Maghinardo Pagani, Italian nobleman and statesman
- William of March, English Lord Treasurer and bishop
