= 1300s =

1300s may refer to:

- The century from 1300 to 1399, almost synonymous with the 14th century (1301–1400)
- 1300s (decade), the period from 1300 to 1309
