= 1346 =

1346 in various calendars
- Gregorian calendar: 1346; MCCCXLVI
- Ab urbe condita: 2099
- Armenian calendar: 795; ԹՎ ՉՂԵ
- Assyrian calendar: 6096
- Balinese saka calendar: 1267–1268
- Bengali calendar: 752–753
- Berber calendar: 2296
- English Regnal year: 19 Edw. 3 – 20 Edw. 3
- Buddhist calendar: 1890
- Burmese calendar: 708
- Byzantine calendar: 6854–6855
- Chinese calendar: 乙酉年 (Wood Rooster); 4043 or 3836 — to — 丙戌年 (Fire Dog); 4044 or 3837
- Coptic calendar: 1062–1063
- Discordian calendar: 2512
- Ethiopian calendar: 1338–1339
- Hebrew calendar: 5106–5107
- Hindu calendars
- Vikram Samvat: 1402–1403
- Shaka Samvat: 1267–1268
- Kali Yuga: 4446–4447
- Holocene calendar: 11346
- Igbo calendar: 346–347
- Iranian calendar: 724–725
- Islamic calendar: 746–747
- Japanese calendar: Jōwa 2 (貞和２年)
- Javanese calendar: 1258–1259
- Julian calendar: 1346; MCCCXLVI
- Korean calendar: 3679
- Minguo calendar: 566 before ROC 民前566年
- Nanakshahi calendar: −122
- Thai solar calendar: 1888–1889
- Tibetan calendar: ཤིང་མོ་བྱ་ལོ་ (female Wood-Bird); 1472 or 1091 or 319 — to — མེ་ཕོ་ཁྱི་ལོ་ (male Fire-Dog); 1473 or 1092 or 320

Year 1346 (MCCCXLVI) was a common year starting on Sunday of the Julian calendar. It was a year in the 14th century, in the midst of a period known in European history as the Late Middle Ages. In Asia that year, the Black Death came to the troops of the Golden Horde Khanate; the disease also affected the Genoese Europeans they were attacking, before spreading to the rest of Europe. In Central and East Asia, there was a series of revolts after Kazan Khan was killed in an uprising, and the Chagatai Khanate began to splinter and fall; several revolts in China began what would eventually lead to the overthrow of the Yuan dynasty. The Indian kingdom of Vijayanagara won several victories over Muslim conquerors in the north in this year as well.

In Eastern Europe, Stefan Dušan was proclaimed Tsar of Serbia on April 16 (Easter Sunday) at Skopje. In the nearby Byzantine Empire, the Ottoman emir Orhan married Byzantine princess Theodora as part of an alliance between her father John VI Kantakouzenos and the Ottomans. Ongoing civil wars in both Bulgaria and Byzantium continued. Denmark sold its portion of Northern Estonia to the Livonian Order of the Teutonic Knights after finally quelling the St. George's Night Uprising. In Central Europe, Charles IV of Luxembourg was elected Roman King on July 11. A number of banking families in Italy, including the Bardi family, faced bankruptcy in this year, and much of Italy suffered a famine. The Hundred Years' War between the Kingdom of France and the Kingdom of England continued in Western Europe, as Edward III of England led an invasion onto the continent and won a number of victories.

== Events ==
- Spring – A severe Bubonic Plague epidemic begins in the Crimea, marking the first major epidemic of the Black Death.
- March 18 – The French prepare to defend the channel coasts.
- April 1–August 20 – Siege of Aiguillon: The French fail to take Aiguillon from its English defenders.
- April 16 – The Serbian Empire is proclaimed in Skopje by Dusan Silni, occupying much of Southeast Europe.
- May–June – An English invasion fleet assembles at Portsmouth.
- June 9 – Battle of St Pol de Léon: The English army defeats Charles of Blois in Brittany.
- June 15 – Genoese forces led by Simone Vignoso land on the Mediterranean island of Chios and capture it from local Greek control within a week, apart from the Castle of Chios, which resists until 12 September.
- June 20 – The English win a small victory at La Roche-Derrien in Brittany.
- June 24 – The leaders of Ghent, Bruges and Ypres agree to support Edward III.
- July – Edward III orders the closing of English ports to stop information from reaching France.
- July 3 – The English fleet attempts to sail from Portsmouth to Normandy, but is forced back by contrary winds.
- July 11 – Charles IV, Count of Luxembourg and King of Bohemia, is elected King of the Romans.
- July 11–12 – Edward III and the English army cross the English Channel and begin an invasion of France.
- July 12–18 – The English raid and burn neighbouring towns and villages in the Cotentin Peninsula.
- July 26 – Battle of Caen (1346): An English army captures and sacks the French city of Caen.
- August 10 – Jaume Ferrer sets out from Mallorca for the "River of Gold", the Senegal River.
- August 24 – Battle of Blanchetaque: The English defeat the French.
- August 26 – Battle of Crécy: The English defeat the French, in the first European battle where gunpowder is used.
- September 4 – The English begin the siege of Calais.
- September–October – Anglo-Gascon offensives overrun large parts of southwest France.
- October 4 – The English capture and sack the French city of Poitiers.
- October 17 – Battle of Neville's Cross: The English army defeats the Scots.
- October–November – Several Mongol towns in the Crimea are cleared of inhabitants by the Black Death.
- Repairs are made in the Hagia Sophia.

== Asia ==
=== Western Asia ===
The Golden Horde's siege of Kaffa continued through 1346, despite a number of obstacles. They were struck with the Black Plague and forced to retreat, although not until the following year. As one Russian historian records:

Citizens of Tournai bury plague victims. Miniature (c. 1353) from The Chronicles of Gilles Li Muisis

In the same year [1346], God's punishment struck the people in the eastern lands, in the town Ornach, and in Khastorokan, and in Sarai, and in Bezdezh, and in other towns in those lands; the mortality was great among the Bessermens, and among the Tartars, and among the Armenians and the Abkhazians, and among the Jews, and among the European foreigners, and among the Circassians, and among all who lived there, so that they could not bury them.

The many areas and peoples listed here represent much of Western Asia and the Caucasus. The "European foreigners" are those fighting with the Tartars in the Mongol-led siege of Kaffa. These Europeans would return to Europe the following year, carrying the plague with them. Travellers returning from the Crimea also carried the plague to Byzantium and Arabia, according to Greek and Arab scholars of the time.

Another account of the events in the Crimea reads:

It seemed to the besieged Christians as if arrows were shot out of the sky to strike and humble the pride of the infidels who rapidly died with marks on their bodies and lumps in their joints and several part, followed by putrid fever; all advice and help of the doctors being of no avail. Whereupon the Tartars, worn out by this pestilential disease, and falling on all sides as if thunderstruck, and seeing that they were perishing hopelessly, ordered the corpses to be placed upon their engines and thrown into the city of Kaffa. Accordingly were the bodies of the dead hurled over the walls, so that the Christians were not able to hide or protect themselves from this danger, although they carried away as many dead as possible and threw them into the sea. But soon the whole air became infected, and the water poisoned, and such a pestilence grew up that scarcely one out of a thousand was able to escape.

Modern scholars consider this one of the earliest, and most deadly, biological attacks in world history, though in the end the Mongols were forced to retreat. Early sources state that the plague began its spread in the spring of 1346 at the River Don near the Black Sea, then spread throughout Russia, the Caucasus, and the Genovese provinces within the year.

Further south in Georgia, King George the Brilliant died and was succeeded by King David IX. King George V had managed to increase the Georgian realm to all of Transcaucasia. However, after 1346 the Kingdom began to decline, caused by George's death and the devastating spread of the plague throughout the area soon afterwards.

=== Central and East Asia ===
Central Asia was marked in 1346 by the continued disintegration of the Mongol's domains, as well as by Muslim expansion. Kazan Khan, emperor of the Chagatai Khanate, was killed by the forces of Qazaghan in this year, putting an end to the Chagtai Khanate's status as a unified empire. Qazghan was the leader of the group of Turkish nobles opposed to Mongol rule. Qazghan had been wounded by Kazan's forces earlier in the year, but rather than taking advantage of his opponent's weakness, Kazan retreated and many of his troops abandoned him.

To the east, Kashmir was conquered by Shah Mir, the first Muslim to rule the area. Kathmandu was also conquered in this year. However, Muslim expansion did suffer some defeats in southern India. The Hindu kingdom of Vijayanagara in India conquered the Hoysalas and celebrated its "festival of victory", strengthening their status as a legitimate Hindu empire in opposition to Muslim rule in the north. The Delhi Sultanate in Northern India, Muhammad bin Tughluq, had a particular disdain for Hinduism, and the Deccan culture of the south. Telugu chieftains gathered in opposition to the Sultan in this year and celebrated victory.

Further east, Ibn Battuta traveled from Southeast Asia to Khanbaliq (Beijing) in China. Although the Muslim leaders there extended him a warm welcome, they advised him to leave the city soon. A civil war had caused the Khan to flee the city, and riots were becoming more and more widespread. Meanwhile, T'aigo Wangsa, a Korean Buddhist monk, traveled to China to receive training under the guidance of Buddhist leader Shih-wu. T'aigo later founded the T'aigo sect of Korean Buddhism.

== Europe ==
=== Scandinavia ===
In 1346 Denmark sold Northern Estonia (Danish Estonia) to the Teutonic Knights following the end of an uprising and conflict between the pro-Danish party (bishop Olaf of Lindanise) and the pro-German party (captain Marquard Breide), called the St. George's Night Uprising. The Danish dominions in were sold for 10,000 marks to the Livonian Order, ignoring the promise by Christopher II in 1329 never to abandon or sell its Estonian territories. The King of Denmark even made a public statement "repenting" for that broken promise, and asked forgiveness from the pope.

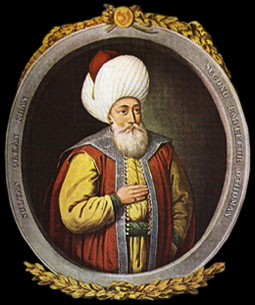
The Ottoman emir Orhan married Byzantine princess Theodora in 1346

=== Balkans and Asia Minor ===
In the Balkans, on April 16 (Easter Sunday), Stefan Dušan was crowned in Skopje as Tsar of the new Serbian Empire, which now occupied much of southeastern Europe. Also in 1346, both Bulgaria and Byzantium (which at this time covered most of Greece) were in the middle of a series of civil wars. At the same time, the Christian-held islands and possessions around the Aegean Sea were subject to Turkish raids.

Orhan, the Ottoman Turkish prince of Bithynia was married to Theodora, daughter of Emperor John VI Kantakouzenos. The Greek clergy believed that the marriage of a Christian princess and a prominent Muslim would increase the region's power. Orhan already had several other wives, and although Theodora was permitted to keep her religion, she was required to spend the rest of her life in an Islamic harem. Kantakouzenos hoped that Orhan would become his ally in any future wars, but Orhan, like his fellow Turks, became his enemy in the Genoese war. As part of the alliance, the Ottoman prince was permitted to sell the Christians he had captured at Constantinople as slaves in the public market.

=== Central ===
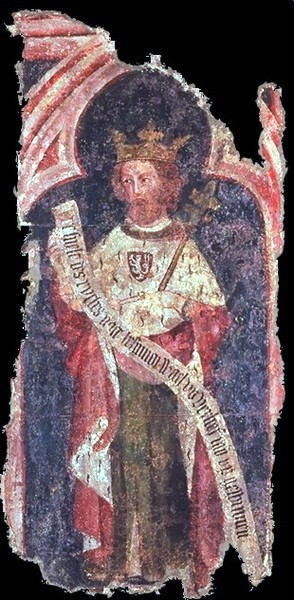
Charles IV, elected Holy Roman Emperor in 1346

On July 11, Charles IV of Luxembourg was elected emperor of the Holy Roman Empire. In consequence of an alliance between his father and Pope Clement VI, the relentless enemy of the emperor Louis IV, Charles was chosen Roman king in opposition to Louis by some of the princes at Rhens. He had previously promised to be subservient to Clement, he confirmed the papacy in the possession of wide territories, promised to annul the acts of Louis against Clement, to take no part in Italian affairs, and to defend and protect the church.

Charles IV was at this time in a very weak position in Germany. Owing to the terms of his election, he was derisively referred to by some as a "priest's king" (Pfaffenkönig). Many bishops and nearly all of the Imperial cities remained loyal to Louis the Bavarian. Charles further endangered his high position when he backed the losing side in the Hundred Years' War. He lost his father and many of his best knights at the Battle of Crécy in August 1346. He himself was wounded on the same field.

Meanwhile, in Italy a number of banks in Florence collapsed due to internal problems in Florence, contributed by King Edward III of England defaulting on some of his loans. Most notably, the Bardi family went bankrupt in this year. Italy also suffered a famine, making it difficult for the Papacy to recruit troops for the attack on Smyrna. The Venetians, however, organized an alliance uniting several European parties (Sancta Unio), composed notably of the Knights Hospitaller, which carried out five consecutive attacks on İzmir and the Western Anatolian coastline controlled by Turkish states. In the realm of technology, papermaking reached Holland, and firearms made their way to Northern Germany in this year. The earliest records in the area place them in the city of Aachen.

=== Western Europe ===
On July 11, King Edward III crossed the English Channel and arrived in Normandy the following day with 1,600 ships. He took the ports of La Hogue and Barfleur with overwhelming force and continued inland towards Caen, taking towns along the way. The French mounted a defence at Caen, but were ultimately defeated. The French had been planning to cross the channel and invade England with a force of about 14,000 led by Jean le Franc, but Edward's attack forced them onto the defensive.

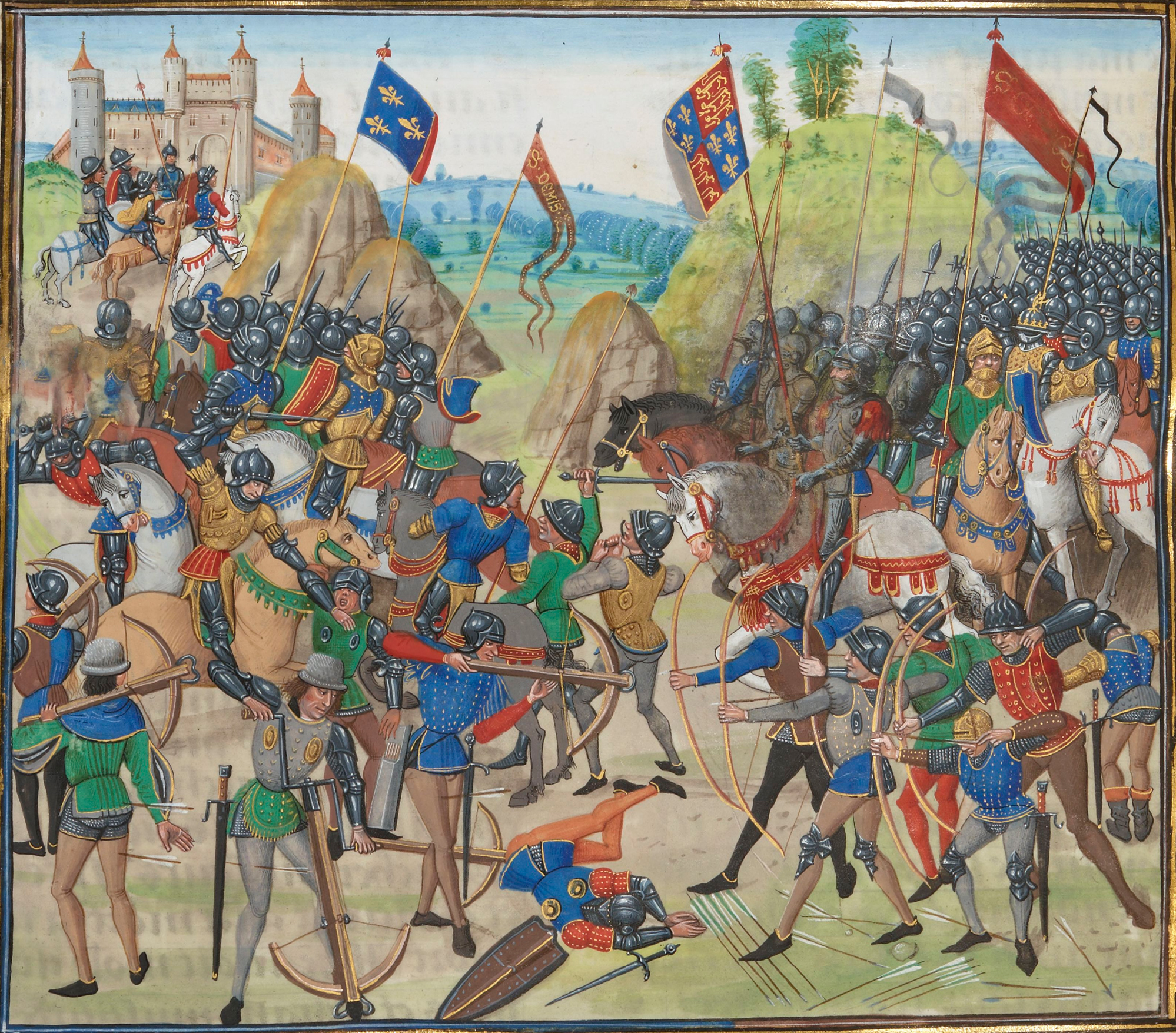
Battle of Crecy, 1346

The French king, Philippe VI, destroyed several bridges to prevent Edward's advance, but the English took the town of Poissy in August and repaired its bridge in order to advance. The French king mounted a defence near the forest at Crécy, which ended in another English victory. Edward then proceeded to Calais, laying siege to the city from September 4. Meanwhile, Jean de France, King Philippe's son, besieged the city of Aigullon, but with no success. Philippe also urged the Scots to continue the fight against England to the north. The Scots, believing that the English were preoccupied with Calais, marched into England toward Durham in October, but were met and defeated by an English force of knights and clergymen at the Battle of Neville's Cross, and King David of Scotland was captured. The Irish also mounted a brief resistance, but were similarly defeated. Before the end of the year, Edward also captured Poitiers and the towns surrounding Tonnay-Charente.

For his role in the Battle of Crécy, opposite Edward the Black Prince, Philippe VI honoured the bravery of John I, Count of Luxemburg and King of Bohemia (also known as John the Blind) by adopting his arms and motto: "Ich Dien" or "I Serve". John's decades of fighting had already made his name widely known throughout Europe, and his heroic death at Crécy became the subject of legend, recorded by writers such as Froissart.

== Births ==
- July 20 – Margaret, Countess of Pembroke, English princess, daughter of King Edward III of England (d. 1361)
- date unknown – Eustache Deschamps, French poet (d. 1406)

== Deaths ==
- February 10 – Blessed Clare of Rimini (b. 1282)
- March 28 – Venturino of Bergamo, Dominican preacher (b. 1304)
- August – Muhammad Aytimur, leader of the Sarbadars of Sabzewar (alternative date is September)
- August 26 (killed in the Battle of Crécy):
  - Charles II, Count of Alençon (b. 1297)
  - Louis I, Count of Flanders (b. 1304)
  - Louis II, Count of Blois
  - John of Bohemia (b. 1296)
  - Rudolph, Duke of Lorraine (b. 1320)
- October – Raghnall Mac Ruaidhrí, Scottish magnate
- October 17 (killed in the Battle of Neville's Cross):
  - John Randolph, 3rd Earl of Moray
  - Maurice de Moravia, Earl of Strathearn
- November 14 – Ostasio I da Polenta, Lord of Ravenna (assassinated)
- November 27 – Saint Gregory of Sinai (b. c. 1260)
- date unknown
  - Eustace Folville, English outlaw
  - Hélion de Villeneuve, Grand Master of the Knights of St John
