= Abu Sa'id Uthman I =

Abu Sa'id Uthman I may refer to:

- Abu Sa'id Uthman I (Abd al-Wadid ruler)
- Abu Sa'id Uthman I (Marinid ruler)
