= John of St Amand =

John of St Amand, Canon of Tournay (c. 1230 – 1303), also known as Jean de Saint-Amand and Johannes de Sancto Amando, was a medieval author on pharmacology, teaching at the University of Paris. He wrote treatises on a variety of topics including magnetism and experimental method.

== Writings ==
Among St Amand's many treatises was one on the magnet. His pharmacopoeia was the Commentary on the Antedotary of Nicholas.

Like Roger Bacon (c. 1219 – c. 1292) after him, St Amand wrote on experimental method. The historian of science Lynn Thorndike explains that St Amand "asserts that experimentum alone is 'timorous and fallacious', but that 'fortified by reason' it gives 'experimental knowledge'". In his view, what St Amand meant was that experimentation had to be methodical, and used alongside theory. On simples used in herbal medicine, St Amand stated specific rules for practical testing: he advised that the specimen had to be pure; that the test should be on a simple disease; that the test be repeated; and that the dose should depend on the patient. Thorndike notes that both St Amand and Albertus Magnus preceded Bacon in their use of the phrase "experimental knowledge".
