= Simon de Melun =

Simon de Melun (1250 – 11 July 1302 in Kortrijk) was a Marshal of France killed in the Battle of the Golden Spurs.

He was a younger son of Viscount Adam II of Melun and Constance of Sancerre. From his mother, he inherited the castles of La Loupe and Marcheville.

In 1270, he followed King Louis IX of France in his Eighth Crusade to Tunisia. Under King Philip III of France he served as Seneschal of the Périgord, Quercy, Limousin and Carcassonne. In 1282 he participated in the Aragonese Crusade as Master of Crossbowmen (maître des arbalétriers). King Philip IV of France made him Marshal of France in 1290. In 1302 Simon went to war against Flanders, but was killed in the Battle of the Golden Spurs, together with most other French commanders.
