= Venturino of Bergamo =

Servant of God Venturino of Bergamo OP
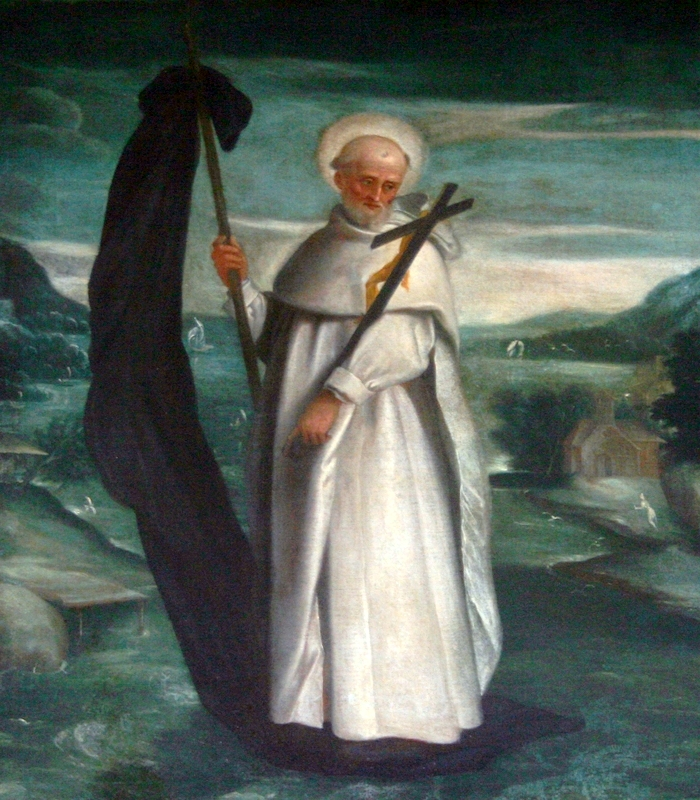
- Born: 9 April 1304; Bergamo, Italy
- Died: 28 March 1346 (aged 41); Smyrna, Ottoman Empire

Venturino of Bergamo (9 April 1304 – 28 March 1346) was an Italian Dominican preacher. His cause for beatification is only within preliminary stages.

== Life ==
He was born at Bergamo, and received the habit of the Order of Friars Preachers at the convent of St. Stephen, Bergamo, 22 January 1319. From 1328 to 1335 he won fame preaching in all the cities of upper Italy.

In February, 1335, he planned to make a penitential pilgrimage to Rome with about thirty thousand of his converts. His purpose was misunderstood, and Pope Benedict XII, then residing at Avignon, thought that Venturino wished to make himself pope. He wrote letters to Giovanni Pagnotti, Bishop of Anagni, his spiritual vicar, to the Canons of St. Peter's and St. John Lateran's, and to the Roman senators empowering them to stop the pilgrimage.

This complaint to the Dominican Master General resulted in an ordinance of the Chapter of London (1335) condemning such pilgrimages. The pope's letters and commands, however, did not reach Venturino, and he arrived in Rome, 21 March 1335. He was well received, and preached in various churches. Twelve days later he left Rome, without explanation, and the pilgrimage ended in disorder.

In June, he requested an audience with Benedict XII at Avignon; he was seized and cast into prison (1335–43). He was restored to favour by Pope Clement VI, who appointed him to preach a crusade against the Turks, 4 January 1344; his success was remarkable. He urged the pope to appoint Humbert II of Dauphiné, whose friend and spiritual adviser he had been, leader of the crusade, but Humbert proved incapable and the crusade came to nothing. Venturino's writings consist of sermons (now lost) and letters. He died at Smyrna.
