= Maghinardo Pagani =

Maghinardo Pagani (or Pagano) of Susinana (died 1302) was an Italian condottiero and statesman living in the 13th-14th centuries. He was seignior of Faenza and Imola, and attempted unsuccessfully to conquer also Forlì.

During the wars between Guelphs and Ghibellines, he sided initially with the former, fighting for Florence against Arezzo at the battle of Campaldino. Later, however, he was a long-time champion of the Ghibellines of Romagna, in alliance with the Ordelaffi of Forlì.

His granddaughter Marzia degli Ubaldini married Francesco II Ordelaffi, Lord of Forlì.
