= John de Sècheville =

John de Sècheville (or John de Sicca Villa) (died 1302) was a philosopher in the thirteenth century; his most famous work was his "De Principiis Naturae".

He was English, of noble stock, and lived the majority of his life in England. Information about his life is scant; it isn't known when he was born, though, he was still alive in 1292 (when John Peckham, Archbishop of Canterbury died).

By 1245, he was already ordained, a Master of Arts and appointed to the Living of Pilham by the Duke of Cornwall. A little later, he is first recorded at the University of Paris, where in 1256 he became the Vice-Chancellor of Faculty of Arts. Matthew Paris records that John de Sècheville was important within the University and well-respected as an eminent philosopher and scientist.

He was a Canon at Glasney in Cornwall till December 1271, when he was appointed to a Prebend at Crediton. His final appointment appears to have been as Prior of St Neots in 1292, dying in 1302.
