= Dietrich of Apolda =

German Dominican hagiographer

Dietrich of Apolda (died 1302) was a German Dominican hagiographer, writing towards the end of the thirteenth century.

He wrote a popular life of Elizabeth of Hungary, including mythical elements such as the sorcerer Klingsor. He also wrote a lengthy life of St. Dominic, supported by Munio of Zamora.
