= Fang Congyi =

Chinese painter (1302–1393)

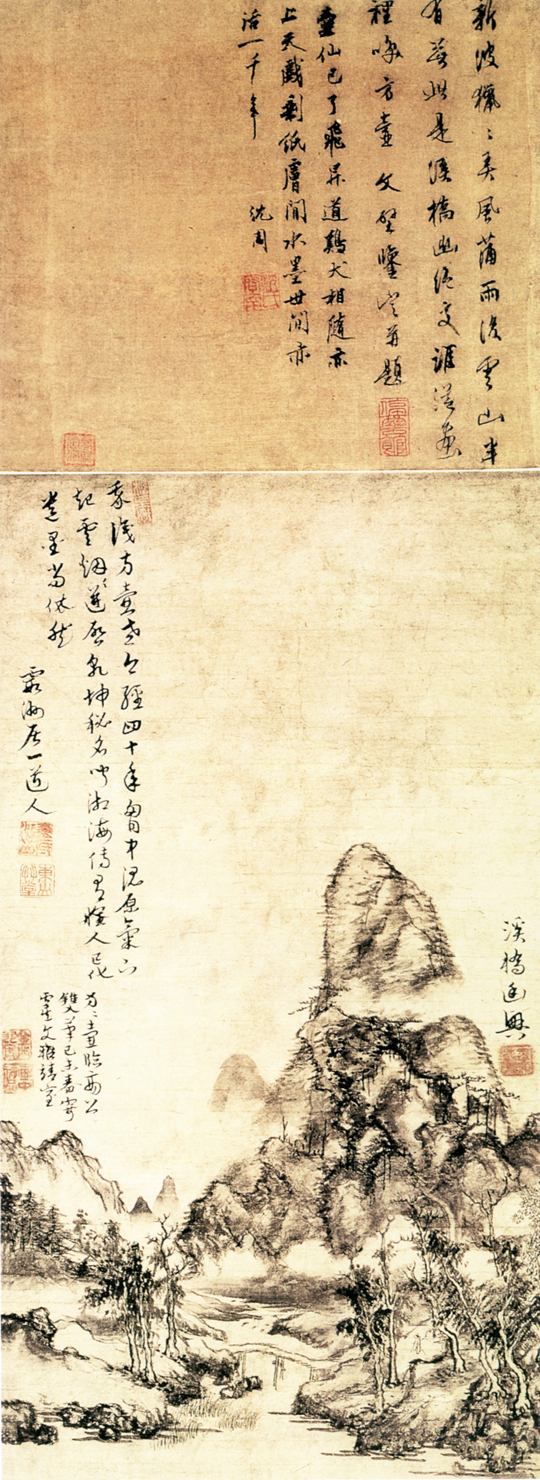
Bridge on the Creek (溪桥幽兴图), Fang Congyi, Palace Museum, Beijing

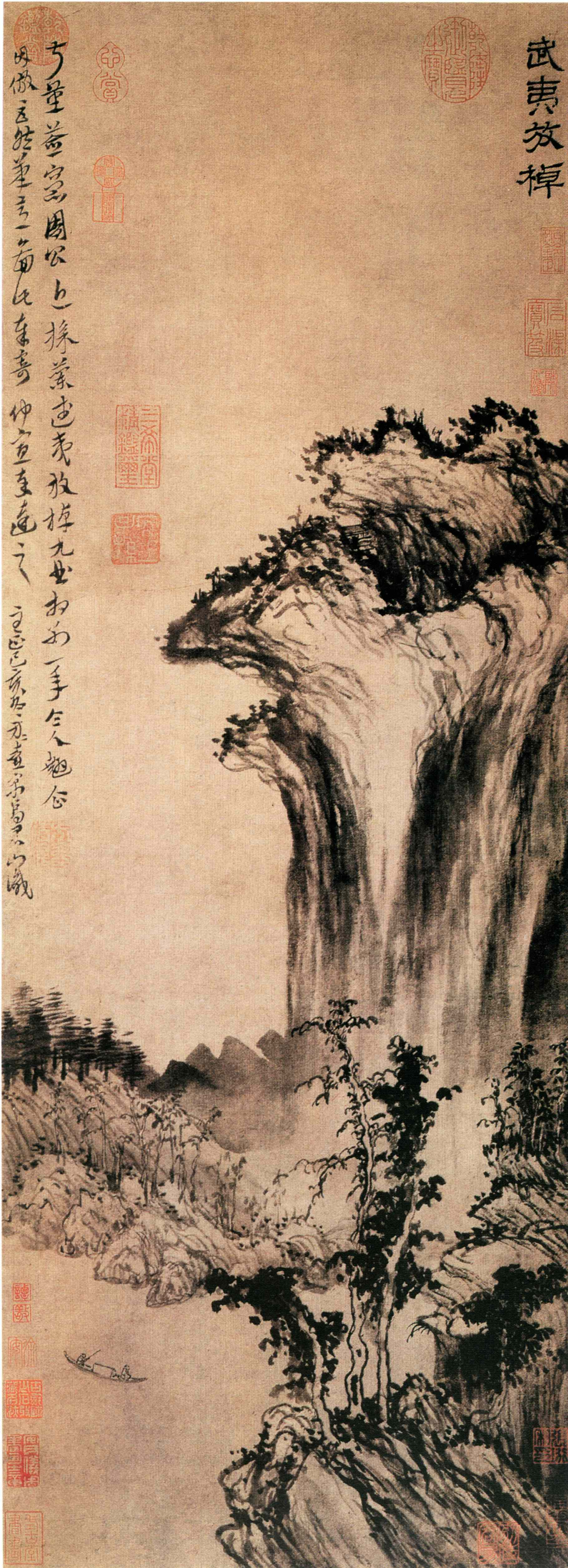
Rowing by Mount Wuyi (武夷放棹图), Fang Congyi, Palace Museum, Beijing

Fang Congyi (simplified Chinese: 方从义; traditional Chinese: 方從義; pinyin: Fāng Cóngyì; 1302–1393), courtesy name Wuyu (無隅), sobriquets Fanghu (方壺), Bumang Daoren (不芒道人), Jinmen Yuke (金門羽客) and Guigu Shanren (鬼谷山人), was a famed Chinese painter during the Yuan dynasty.

Fang was a native of Guixi, Jiangxi Province. In his youth he studied and became a Daoist priest, joining the Zhengyi Dao sect at his local temple. After the death of his principal instructor in the early 1340s, Fang traveled along the Yangtze River to the capital Khanbaliq, now Beijing. It was there that he began painting. He obtained a patron, and produced a number of works based on his travels. He primarily painted landscapes.
