= Gerald Le Marescal =

Styles of Gerald Le Mareschal
- Reference style: The Right Reverend
- Spoken style: My Lord
- Religious style: Bishop

Gerald Le Marescal was Bishop of Limerick in the late 13th and early 14th centuries.

== Biography ==
Formerly Archdeacon of Limerick he was elected bishop in 1272 and received possession of the temporalities on 17 January 1273. Begly says that the king sent an order that he be consecrated by the Archbishop Cashel David Mac Cerbaill; it is not clear whether this was Henry III who died on 16 November 1272 or his son Edward Longshanks. Most of what we know of Gerald Le Marescal comes from references in the Black Book of Limerick and refer to several grants of land including one from Thomas de Clare, Lord of Thomond. He died on 10 February 1302.
