= Shihabuddeen Ahmed Koya =

Indian scholar

Shihabuddeen Ahmed Koya Shaliyathi
- Born: 1884; Kerala, India
- Died: 1954 (aged 69–70)
- Other names: Shihabuddeen Ahmed Koya Shaliyathi
- Known for: scholar hailing from Kerala
- Father: Imadudheen aliyyusswalihathi

Shihabuddeen Ahmed Koya Shaliyathi (Arabic:شهاب الدين احمد كويا شاليات, Malayalam:ശിഹാബുദ്ദീന് അഹ്മദ് കോയ ശാലിയാത്തി), who played vital roles in the reformation process of the Kerala Muslims, was the scholar hailing from Kerala, the southern state of India. He had occupied crucial positions in Samastha Kerala Jamiyyathul Ulama, the official organization of Sunni scholars in Kerala. He was renowned south Indian Shafi scholar who was student of Ahmed Raza Khan Barelvi, founder of Sunni Barelvi movement.

== Early life ==
He was born to Mohyaddin Kutty Haji at Koyamarakkarakamin Kozhikode. He was brought under the strict supervision of his parents in a religious background and earned the primary education from his father. He was admitted in Darse (Masjid based university) borne by Ali Musliyar, the scholar and freedom fighter. He traveled to Bareilly city and got Islamic and spiritual education under Imam Ahmed Raza Khan Barelvi, Mujaddid and famous Sunni scholar of the previous century. He was given permission to accept disciples in Sufi Qadri order by him.

He carried on his further studies under Chalilakath Kunahmed Haji, the reformer hailing from Kerala, and Shamsul Ulama Moulana Mufti Mahmood, then grand mufti of Madras. He fetched the excellence in Bayan, Badie, Manthiq, and Hadeeth. He completed Nizamiya course from Velore Lathifiya college as per his father's will.

== Personal life ==
He married from Chaliyath, but it didn't last more and ended in the premature death of the spouse. After the demise of the first spouse, he tied knot with cousin and two sons were born. He was compelled to divorce her due to some technical reason and married daughter of Manekkal Kunnahmed Musliyar.

== Activism ==
During the time of course at Lathifiya College, he was included in Darul Iftha (Fatwa council) and was appointed as teacher in some subjects. After the completion of course from Latifiya college, he was appointed as the teacher in Riyala Jiyan College Tirunnelvel, Tamil Nadu. He carried on the official duty on the behalf of Ali during his leave for the Hajj pilgrimage and worked in Kolayattur Juma Masjid for five years. He took the duty as the chief professor in Badukkal Masjid after the invitation of Sheikh Ubaidullahi Madirasi. In Hijra 1245, he was installed on the grand Mufthi position due to his vast knowledge in four school of thoughts.

=== Samastha Kerala Jamiyyathul Ulama ===
He was the spearhead of the organization in the early intellectual counterattack against the novelty based groups. He chaired the convocation organized at Feroke, Kozhikode district in 1933.

== Works ==
He had thirty-seven books in various subject and handwritten copies of them were preserved in Azhariya Library.

== Death ==
He died in 1954.
