= 1290s =

Decade

The 1290s was a decade of the Julian Calendar which began on January 1, 1290, and ended on December 31, 1299.

== Events ==
=== 1290 ===
==== By place ====
====== Europe ======
- July 10 – King Ladislaus IV of Hungary ("the Cuman") is assassinated at the castle of Körösszeg (modern Romania). He is succeeded by Andrew III ("the Venetian"), after an election by Hungarian nobles, who is crowned by Archbishop Lodomer as new ruler of Hungary and Croatia in Székesfehérvár on July 23.
- December 18 – King Magnus Birgersson of Sweden dies after a 15-year reign. He is succeeded by his 10-year-old son Birger Magnusson.

====== Britain ======
- July 18 – Edict of Expulsion: King Edward I of England ("Longshanks") orders all Jews (at this time probably numbering around 2,000) to leave the country by November 1 (All Saints' Day). The edict was decreed on Tisha B'Av on the Hebrew calendar, a day that commemorates many calamities. They are eventually allowed back in 1656.
- September – The 7-year-old Margaret, Maid of Norway, queen-designate and heir to the crown of Scotland, dies en route to the British Isles in Orkney, leading to thirteen competitors for the crown of Scotland, a succession crisis.
- November 28 – Eleanor of Castile, wife of Edward I, dies while traveling in the North. She has been suffering from illness for some time, and the cold and dampness of the winter months probably aggravate her condition.
- December – Edward I travels with the body of Queen Eleanor from Lincoln to London. Remembering his wife, Edward erects a series of crosses at each location that the body rests overnight. These are known as the twelve Eleanor crosses.
- Winter – The second of the Statutes of Mortmain passed during the reign of Edward I prevents land from passing into the possession of the Church.
- Quia Emptores, a statute passed by Edward I, puts an end to the practice of subinfeudations. The statute allows land to be sold according to royal approval, as long as the new owner answers directly to his lord or the king.

====== Levant ======
- June – Genoa concludes a new commercial treaty with the Mamluks; five galleys sent by King James II of Aragon ("the Just") join the Venetian Crusader fleet (some 20 ships) on its way to Acre. On board the fleet are Italian urban militias and mercenary forces under Seneschal Jean I de Grailly, who have fought for the Papal States in the so-called Italian Crusades.
- August – Italian Crusaders massacre Muslim merchants and peasants, and some local Christians in Acre. Some claim it began at a drunken party – others that a European husband found his wife making love to a Muslim. The barons and local knights try to rescue a few Muslims and take them to the safety of the castle, while some ringleaders are arrested.
- August 30 – Survivors and relatives of the massacre at Acre take bloodstained clothing to Sultan Qalawun ("the Victorious") in Cairo, who demands that the leaders of the riot be handed over for trial, but the nobles refuse to send them and Qalawun now obtains legal clearance from the religious authorities in Cairo to break the truce with Crusader states.
- October – Qalawun orders a general mobilization of the Mamluk forces. In a council, it is decided that a peace delegation be sent to Cairo under Guillaume de Beaujeu, Grand Master of the Knights Templar. However, Qalawun demands huge compensation for those killed in Acre, and sends a Syrian army to the coast of Palestine, near Caesarea.
- November 10 – Qalawun ("the Victorious") dies as the Egyptian Mamluk army sets out for Acre. He is succeeded by his eldest son Al-Ashraf Khalil as ruler of the Mamluk Sultanate. Khalil orders his allies and tributaries in Syria to prepare for a campaign next spring. Governors and castle commanders are ordered to assemble siege equipment and armor.

====== Asia ======
- June 13 – Shamsuddin Kayumars, Mamluk ruler of the Delhi Sultanate, is murdered and succeeded by Jalal-ud-din Khalji (or Firuz Shah I), founder of the Khalji dynasty, ending Mamluk rule and instigating the Khalji Revolution.
- September 27 – The 6.8 M_{s} Zhili earthquake affects the province of Zhili in China, with a maximum Mercalli intensity of IX (Violent), killing 7,270–100,000 people.

==== By topic ====
====== Art and Culture ======
- June 8 – Beatrice Portinari, muse of the Italian poet Dante Alighieri, dies in Florence. In his Divine Comedy (La Divina Commedia), he transforms his memory of Beatrice into an allegory of divine love.

====== Climate and Weather ======
- "Year without winter" – An exceptionally rare instance of uninterrupted transition, from autumn to the following spring, in England and the mainland of Western Europe.

====== Education ======
- March 1 – The University of Coimbra is founded in Lisbon by Denis I ("the Poet King"). He decrees that Portuguese is the official language of Portugal, replacing classical Latin in that capacity.

====== Literature ======
- The Dnyaneshwari is written in India. This holy book is a commentary on the Bhagvad Gita and is narrated by Dnyaneshwar.

=== 1291 ===
==== By place ====
====== Europe ======
- August 1 – Federal Charter of 1291: The "three forest cantons" (Waldstätte) of Switzerland (Schwyz, Uri and Unterwalden) form a defensive alliance to protect themselves from the House of Habsburg; this is a starting point for growth of the Old Swiss Confederacy. This year is also the traditional date of the Rütli Oath (Rütlischwur), the swearing of an oath by the three cantonal representatives at Rütli meadow.
- August 6 – A combined Genoese-Sevillian fleet led by Admiral Benedetto Zaccaria wins a victory over 27 Marinid galleys at Alcácer Seguir –12 galleys are taken and the rest put to flight. The following day, Benedetto drags the captured vessels along the coast in view of Abu Yaqub Yusuf an-Nasr, Marinid ruler of Morocco, who, "defeated and dishonored", withdraws his fleet to Fez.
- Late September – Abu Yaqub Yusuf an-Nasr crosses the Strait of Gibraltar from Alcácer Seguir to Tarifa. During the next three months, Marinid forces besiege Vejer de la Frontera, and carry out daily raids around Ferez. In the meantime, other Marinid raiding parties devastate the countryside as far north as Alcalá del Río, near Seville.
- November–December – The kings Sancho IV of Castile ("the Brave") and James II of Aragon ("the Just") agree to join the war against the Marinids and conclude a treaty of friendship. Muhammad II, Nasrid ruler of Granada, gives his support to Sancho to take Tarifa from the Marinids. In the agreement, Castile and Aragon will respect their own boundaries.
- Pope Nicholas IV confirms the independence of San Marino by papal bull.

=== 1292 ===
==== By place ====
====== Asia ======
- Shanghai County is established.
- Kublai Khan sends a Mongol expeditionary force (some 20,000 men) to Java. He collects an invasion fleet with some 500–1,000 ships and enough provisions for a year from Fujian, Jiangxi and Huguang in southern China. The fleet travels past Champa (modern Vietnam) and the Karimata Islands. The Mongols land on Java, taking the capital of Kediri, but it proves impossible to hold.
- King Mangrai the Great of Ngoenyang conquers and annexes the Mon kingdom of Hariphunchai, creating a political union in the form of the Lan Na Kingdom.
- The Vaghela dynasty in Gujarat (located along the western coast of India) is subjugated by the Deccan Seuna (Yadava) dynasty of Daulatabad.

====== Britain ======
- November 17 – John Balliol is selected by King Edward I of England as ruler of Scotland at Berwick from among 13 competitors for the Crown of Scotland. Edward then treats John as a puppet ruler and Scotland as a vassal state, provoking the Wars of Scottish Independence, commencing in 1296. John is crowned at Scone on November 30 (Saint Andrew's Day). Scotland's castles are returned to the powerful magnates.
- December – John Balliol is summoned by Edward I to Westminster to answer an appeal by Macduff of Fife against a judgment imposed on him by the Scottish Parliament. John refuses to answer Macduff's appeal, 'without consulting the people of his realm'. Edward asks for compensation for the violation of English law and demands to hand him over three Scottish castles as repayment for the crime committed.

====== Europe ======
- May 5 – The College of Electors select Adolf, count of Nassau, as the new King of the Romans and successor of Habsburg Rudolf I who had died the previous year. Adolf is forced to make wide-ranging concessions to the Electors to get elected. He is crowned king on June 24 in Aachen by the Archbishop of Cologne.
- June 24 – Castilian forces led by King Sancho IV ("the Brave") begin the siege of Tarifa: eleven newly built engines bombard the city constantly by land and sea. Meanwhile, Muhammad II, Nasrid ruler of Granada, provides the army of Sancho with men, arms and also aids the blockade in the Strait of Gibraltar. Muhammad attacks Marinid outposts and his forces seize Estepona on the coast to the west of Málaga. Sancho conquers Tarifa after a siege of four months, on October 13.
- December – Muhammad II sends ambassadors to the Castilian court to ask Sancho IV to surrender Tarifa. Sancho refuses to yield the city to Granada and Muhammad, feeling betrayed, switches sides to form an alliance with the Marinids.

====== Levant ======
- Mamluk forces under Sultan Al-Ashraf Khalil accompanied by his vizier Ibn al-Sal'us arrive in Damascus. Khalil travels via Aleppo to besiege the castle of Rumkale (Qal'at ar-Rum, "Castle of the Romans"), the official seat of Stephen IV, patriarch of Armenia. The Mamluks besiege the castle with more than 30 catapults and capture it after 30 days.
- Al-Ashraf Khalil returns to Damascus and assembles an army to attack Sis, the capital of the Armenian Kingdom of Cilicia. An Armenian embassy arrives in Damascus, and reaches a settlement with Khalil. The cities of Til Hemdun, Marash and Behesni are given to the Mamluks in order to maintain peace.
- November – Michael II becomes Syriac Orthodox patriarch of Antioch (until 1312).

==== By topic ====
====== Religion ======
- Spring – The Taxatio Ecclesiastica, compiled in 1291–1292, is completed under the order of Pope Nicholas IV. It is a detailed database valuation for ecclesiastical taxation of English, Welsh and Irish churches.
- April 4 – Nicholas IV dies after a 4-year pontificate in Rome. The cardinals assemble at Perugia to elect a new pope (1292–1294 papal election).

=== 1293 ===
==== By area ====
====== Africa ======
- December – Mamluk sultan of Egypt Khalil is assassinated by his regent Baydara, who briefly claims the sultanate, before being assassinated himself by a rival political faction.

====== Asia ======
- May 26 – An earthquake in Kamakura, Japan kills an estimated 23,000.
- May 31 – The forces of Raden Wijaya win a major victory in the Mongol invasion of Java, which is considered to be the founding date of the city of Surabaya.
- The Japanese era Shōō ends, and the Einin era begins.
- Kublai Khan sends a fleet to the islands of Southeast Asia, including Java.
- The Hindu Majapahit Empire is founded by Kertarajasa in Java. It benefits from internal conflict and Mongol intervention, to defeat the Singhasari Kingdom and establish the empire.

====== Europe ======
- Torkel Knutsson leads Sweden in beginning the Third Swedish Crusade, against unchristianized Finnish Karelia. In the same year, the construction of Vyborg Castle begins, by orders of Knutsson.
- The Ordinances of Justice are enacted, in the Commune of Florence.
- The Isle of Wight is sold to King Edward I of England by Isabella de Forz, Countess of Devon, for 6,000 marks.

==== By topic ====
====== Arts and culture ======
- Dante Alighieri completes the book of verse La Vita Nuova.

====== Education ======
- May 20 – King Sancho IV of Castile creates the Studium General, forerunner to the modern Complutense University of Madrid.

====== Religion ======
- January – Ignatius bar Wahib becomes Syriac Orthodox Patriarch of Mardin.

=== 1294 ===
==== Asia ====
- February 18 – Kublai Khan dies; by this time the separation of the four khanates of the Mongol Empire (the Chagatai Khanate in Central Asia, the Golden Horde in Russia, the Ilkhanate in Persia, and the Yuan Dynasty in China) has deepened.

==== Europe ====
- March 30 – A Novgorodian army led by Prince Roman Glebovich attempts a storm of Vyborg, but the attack fails.
- Spring – Following the arrival of a fleet from Sweden, an offensive takes place in which Sweden captures Kexholm after an assault.
- July 5 – Following the Papal election, 1292–94, Pope Celestine V succeeds Nicholas IV, becoming the 192nd pope.
- Autumn – In response to the actions of new royal administrators in north and west Wales, Madog ap Llywelyn leads a revolt against his English overlords.
- December 24 – Pope Boniface VIII succeeds Pope Celestine V, becoming the 193rd pope, after Celestine V abdicates the papacy on December 13, only five months after reluctantly accepting his surprise election on July 5, wishing to return to his life as an ascetic hermit.
- John Balliol, King of Scotland, decides to refuse King Edward I of England's demands for support in a planned invasion of France, the result being the negotiation of the Auld Alliance with France and Norway in the following year. These actions play a part in precipitating the Scottish Wars of Independence, which begin in 1296.
- Strata Florida Abbey is rebuilt; it had been destroyed some years earlier, during King Edward I of England's conquest of Wales.
- Architect Arnolfo di Cambio designs Florence Cathedral (Cattedrale di Santa Maria del Fiore, better known simply as Il Duomo); he also begins work on the Basilica of Santa Croce, Florence.
- England and Portugal enter into the first iteration of the Anglo-Portuguese Alliance, the oldest alliance in the world still in force.
- Edward I of England and Philip the Fair of France declare war on each other. To finance this war, both kings lay taxes on the clergy. Pope Boniface VIII insists that kings gain papal consent for taxation of the clergy, and forbids churchmen to pay taxes.

=== 1295 ===
==== By place ====
====== Europe ======
- April 25 – King Sancho IV of Castile ("the Brave") dies of a fatal illness (possibly tuberculosis), after a 11-year reign at Toledo. He is succeeded by his 9-year-old son Ferdinand IV ("the Summoned") as ruler of Castile and León. In the Cortes at Valladolid, Henry of Castile the Senator is appointed guardian of Ferdinand, while Queen María de Molina becomes his regent. During the summer, Ferdinand is betrothed to the 5-year-old Princess Constance of Portugal. Hostilities between Castile and King Denis of Portugal ("the Poet King") are ended by a peace agreement.
- June 20 – Treaty of Anagni: Pope Boniface VIII arranges a peace treaty between King Philip IV of France ("the Fair"), Charles II of Naples ("the Lame"), and James II of Majorca. James returns Sicily to the Papal States, seeking to bring peace between the Capetian House of Anjou and the Kingdom of Sicily; the effort is in vain. Boniface is determined to put an end to the War of the Sicilian Vespers, because he wants to declare a new Crusade for the reconquest of the Holy Land.
- June 26 – Przemysł II is crowned king of Poland at Gniezno, the first coronation of a Polish ruler in 219 years. Przemysł travels to Pomerelia where he confirms the privileges of the monasteries in Oliwa and Żarnowiec. He also visits other major cities: Gdańsk, Tczew and Świecie. In August, Przemysł returns to Greater Poland but in October he travels again to Gdańsk.
- July 22 – War of Curzola: Genoese raids on the Venetian quarter in Constantinople lead to a formal declaration of war with the Republic of Venice. A Venetian fleet (some 40 war galleys) attacks Galata, the quarter of the Genoese merchants. Emperor Andronikos II Palaiologos arrests surviving Venetians in the capital and joins the war with the Republic of Genoa.
- Marco Polo returns to Venice after 24 years of travel in China. When the Polos arrive, Venice is engaged in a naval war with the rival city of Genoa. Marco joins the war and arms a galley equipped with a trebuchet.
- October 23 – The first treaty forming the Auld Alliance ("Old Alliance"), between Scotland and France against England, is signed in Paris by Kings John Balliol and Philip IV.

====== Britain ======
- March 5 – Battle of Maes Moydog: English forces led by William de Beauchamp, 9th Earl of Warwick defeat the Welsh rebels (some 700 men), near the modern-day town of Llanfair Caereinion in Wales. In a night attack on the Welsh infantry, William uses cavalry to drive them into compact formations, which are then shot up by his archers. Madog ap Llywelyn, proclaimed "Prince of Wales", and the remnants of his army are routed and retreat across the Banwy River, in which many drown.
- November 13 – King Edward I of England ("Longshanks") summons the Model Parliament to Westminster, the composition of which serves as a model for later parliaments. The parliament agrees that a tax can be raised to allow him to launch campaigns against France and the rebellious Scots for the forthcoming year.
- Construction begins on Beaumaris Castle in Anglesey under the direction of James of Saint George as part of the conquest of Wales by Edward I.

====== Asia ======
- October 4 – Mongol leader Baydu Khan is executed after a 7-month reign at Tabriz. He is succeeded by Ghazan, who becomes ruler of the Ilkhanate. He converts to Islam, ending a line of Vajrayana (Tantric Buddhist) leaders.
- King Jayavarman VIII is overthrown after a 52-year reign. He is succeeded by his son-in-law Indravarman III as ruler of the Khmer Empire (modern Cambodia).

=== 1296 ===
==== January–December ====
- March 30 – Capture of Berwick: King Edward I of England storms and captures Berwick-upon-Tweed, sacking what is at this time a Scottish border town, with much bloodshed. He slaughters most of the residents, including those who flee to the churches.
- April 12 – King Mangrai the Great of Ngoenyang establishes a new capital by founding Chiangmai, and founds the Mangrai Dynasty, that will rule the Lanna Kingdom of Chiangmai from 1296 to 1578 (the 700th Anniversary Stadium will be built in remembrance of this foundation).
- April 27 – Battle of Dunbar: John Balliol's Scottish army is defeated by an English army commanded by John de Warenne, 6th Earl of Surrey.
- July 20 – Jalal ud din Firuz Khalji dies, and his nephew and son-in-law Ala-Ud-Din-Khalji comes to the throne of the Delhi Sultanate in Hindustan, becoming the most powerful ruler of his dynasty.
- October 21 – The formal coronation of Alauddin Khalji as Sultan of Delhi takes place, and he takes the regnal name Muhammad Shah I.

==== Date unknown ====
- Boniface of Verona expels the Byzantines from their last remaining strongholds on Euboea.
- Chinese diplomat Zhou Daguan spends a year at the court of Khmer King Indravarman III at Angkor, and pens a journal setting forth his observations.
- approximate date – Tarabya, self-proclaimed king of Pegu, is defeated in single combat on war elephants by Wareru.

=== 1297 ===
==== By place ====
====== Europe ======
- January 8 – Guelph forces, led by the Genoese leader François Grimaldi (il Malizia), storm and capture the Rock of Monaco. François, disguised as a Franciscan friar, gains entry to the city, and opens the gates for his soldiers. He seizes the castle with his stepson Rainier I, an event that is commemorated on the coat of arms of Monaco. Rainier becomes the first sovereign ruler of the House of Grimaldi in Monaco; he rules initially until 1301, but the family will be ruling there into the 21st century.
- Treaty of Alcañices: Kings Denis of Portugal ("the Poet King") and 11-year-old Ferdinand IV of Castile ("the Summoned") (under the guidance of his mother, Queen-Regent Maria de Molina) sign a treaty between Portugal and Castile, which establishes an alliance of friendship and mutual defense, leading to a peace of 40 years between the two kingdoms.
- August 20 – Battle of Furnes: French forces under Robert II defeat the Flemings at Veurne. During the battle, Robert's son Philip of Artois is gravely wounded and dies a year later of his wounds.

====== British Isles ======
- April 14 – King Edward I of England makes an appeal outside Westminster Hall for support for the war against France. He apologizes for the high tax demands he has previously levied. Edward asks the Barons (some 1,500 knights) to swear allegiance to his 12-year-old son, Prince Edward of Caernarfon. Aware of the dangers of the opposition to his power, Edward appears before a large crowd and receives total loyalty.
- May – William Wallace, Scottish rebel leader, leads an uprising against the English at Lanark and kills Sheriff William Hesselrig. He joins with William Douglas the Hardy, the first Scottish nobleman in rebellion – combining forces at Sanquhar, Durisdeer and Scone Abbey (known as the Raid on Scone) in June. Later, Wallace captures the English treasury at Scone to finance the rebellion against Edward I of England.
- Summer – Edward I of England orders a punitive expedition against the rebellious Scots. At Roxburgh, an army of some 9,000 men (including 2,000 cavalry) led by John de Warenne is assembled. Meanwhile, William Wallace leaves the forest of Selkirk with reinforcements and turns his attention north of the River Forth.
- July – In Scotland, a group of nobles forms a confederacy (organized by Robert Wishart, bishop of Glasgow), but are defeated by English troops at Irvine. An agreement of submission to Edward I of England is signed by the future Scottish king Robert the Bruce and other Scottish leaders.
- August 22 – Edward I of England leads an expedition to Flanders. He moves with an army (some 8,000 men) supported by 800 knights to Ghent and makes the city his base of operations in Flanders.
- September 11 – Battle of Stirling Bridge: Scottish forces (some 6,000 men) led by Andrew Moray and William Wallace defeat an English army under John de Warenne at Stirling on the Forth.
- October–November – Scottish forces led by William Wallace begin raids in Northumberland and Cumberland. During a ceremony at Selkirk, Wallace is knighted and appointed Guardian of Scotland. (Contradicts First Scottish War of Independence that cites William Wallace as having been made a knight and Guardian of Scotland in March, 1298)
- Winter – Edward I of England accepts a truce proposed by King Philip IV of France ("the Fair") and leaves Flanders. He returns to London and prepares a campaign against William Wallace in Scotland.

==== By topic ====
====== Religion ======
- May 3 – Stefano Colonna, Italian chief magistrate and papal official, captures the treasure of the tomb of Caecilia Metella near Rome, which is sent by the rival Caetani family to Pope Boniface VIII.
- July 11 – King Louis IX of France (died 1270) is canonized by Boniface VIII. Louis a devout Christian of the Catholic Church, banned during his reign prostitution, gambling, blasphemy and judicial duels.
- Boniface VIII attempts to end the rivalry between Genoa and Pisa over the Tyrrhenian islands of Sardinia and Corsica, naming King James II of Aragon ("the Just") as regent of the islands.
- A Portuguese Water Dog is first described in a monk's report of a drowning sailor, who has been pulled from the sea by a dog.

=== 1298 ===
==== By place ====
====== Europe ======
- April 20 – Rindfleisch massacres: The Jews of Röttingen are burned en masse. The Colmar Dominican Rudolph (refers to him in Latin as a carnifex, i.e. butcher or executioner) goes from town to town and kills all the Jews that fall under his control. He destroys the Jewish communities at Rothenburg ob der Tauber, Würzburg, Bamberg, Dinkelsbühl, Nördlingen and Forchheim. In the Free Imperial City of Nuremberg, the Jews thought to seek refuge in the Nuremberg Castle, which are assisted by Christian citizens. But Rindfleisch overcomes the defenders and massacres the Jews, on August 1. Spreading from Franconia to Bavaria and Austria, Rindfleisch and his persecutors destroy 146 communities, and some 20,000 - 100,000 Jews are killed.
- June 1 – Battle of Turaida: Forces of the Livonian Order are decisively defeated near Turaida Castle by the residents of Riga, allied with the Grand Duchy of Lithuania under Vytenis. After their defeat, the Livonians receive reinforcements from the Teutonic Order and defeat the residents of Riga and Lithuanians near Neuermühlen, on June 28. The knights proceed with their campaign, and besiege and capture Riga. In response, King Eric VI of Denmark ("Menved") threatens to invade Livonia, but a truce is reached and the conflict is mediated by Pope Boniface VIII.
- July 2 – Battle of Göllheim: German forces of Duke Albert I defeat King Adolf of Nassau at Göllheim over the prince electors' decision, without electoral act – to dethrone Adolf and proclaim Albert the new ruler of Germany at Frankfurt, on July 27. During the battle, Adolf is killed and his army is destroyed with the loss of 3,000 horses.
- September 9 – Battle of Curzola: The Genoese fleet (some 80 galleys) led by Admiral Lamba Doria defeats the Venetian fleet at Curzola. The disaster is almost complete for Venice: 83 of the 95 galleys are destroyed and some 7,000 men are killed. During the battle, Marco Polo, commanding one of the Venetian ships, is captured.
- After a year's siege, the revolting Italian commune of Palestrina near Rome surrenders to the Papal forces, razed to the ground and salted by order of Boniface VIII, in an act of debellatio.

====== British Isles ======
- Summer – King Edward I of England ("Longshanks") marches from Newcastle upon Tyne with his household to Alnwick and then by way of Chillingham to Roxburgh in Scotland, where he joins the army in July. He proceeds to Lauderdale and encamps at Kirkliston, to the west of Edinburgh, where he remains from July 15 to July 20. The army is accompanied by a long train of supply wagons. Meanwhile, English supply ships, delayed by bad weather, bring food to Leith.
- July 22 – Battle of Falkirk: English forces (some 15,000 men) led by Edward I defeat a Scottish army led by William Wallace at Falkirk. During the battle, the English knights drive off the Scottish horse and archers, but cannot break the pikemen in the center. The Scottish pikemen are formed in four great "hedgehogs" (known as schiltron) but are destroyed by English longbow archers.

====== Asia ======
- Mongol invasion of India: Mongol forces led by Qutlugh Khwaja invade the Sindh region of the Delhi Sultanate and occupy the castle of Sivistan (modern Pakistan). Sultan Alauddin Khalji sends an army under Zafar Khan, who defeats the Mongols, on February 6. Some 20,000 Mongols are killed in the ensuing battle. The survivors are put into chains and brought to Delhi, where they are trampled to death by elephants.
- August 30 – Emperor Fushimi abdicates the throne after an 11-year reign. He is succeeded by his 10-year-old son Go-Fushimi as the 93rd emperor of Japan (until 1301).

==== By topic ====
====== Cities and towns ======
- August 1 – The "ideal city" of Marciac in southern France is founded by King Philip IV ("the Fair") and his Seneschal Guichard de Marzé (or Marciac).

====== Markets ======
- The foreign creditors of the Sienese Gran Tavola Bank start demanding their deposits back, thus accelerating the liquidity crisis faced by the firm.

====== Religion ======
- Ambrose, Augustine, Jerome and Pope Gregory I are named the first Doctors of the Church. They are known collectively as the Great Doctors of the Western Church.

====== Technology ======
- Wang Zhen, Chinese inventor and politician, invents a wooden movable type printing (Bi Sheng invented ceramic movable type in the 11th century).

=== 1299 ===
==== By place ====
====== Europe ======
- July 4 – Battle of Cape Orlando: An Aragonese-Angevin fleet (some 60 galleys) led by Admiral Roger of Lauria defeats a Sicilian fleet near Sicily. During the battle, the larger Aragonese fleet is trapped on a lee shore, but can exploit the situation with the intervention of its 6 reserve galleys. The Sicilians flee when the flagship, with King Frederick III of Sicily on board, pulls back after he collapses from heat exhaustion. Lauria captures 18 Sicilian ships, and orders the massacre of their crews to avenge the death of his nephew at the hands of Frederick.
- July 31 – Pisa and Genoa agree to a thirty-year truce. Part of the treaty includes the end of the Pisan military support to Genoa's enemies in Corsica.
- November 10 – John I, count of Holland, dies and is succeeded by his uncle John II. He establishes a personal union with the County of Hainaut.
- December 1 – Battle of Falconaria: Sicilian forces under King Frederick II defeat Philip I of Taranto. During the battle, Philip is taken prisoner.

====== British Isles ======
- September 8 – Edward I of England ("Longshanks") marries the 19-year-old Margaret of France, the half-sister of King Philip IV ("the Fair").
- William Wallace accompanied by a Scottish retinue goes abroad to France on a diplomatic mission, evidently to canvas support for the kingship of John Balliol.
- Southampton Old Bowling Green is established in Southampton. It is the oldest surviving bowling green.

====== Levant ======
- December – Mongol forces (some 10,000 men) led by Ghazan Khan cross the Euphrates River and invade Syria. They continue south, and successfully take Aleppo. There, Ghazan is joined by forces from his vassal state of Cilician Armenia. King Hethum II leads the Armenian army (which includes Templar and Hospitaller knights). He participates during the Mongol offensive and regains all the Armenian territories which have previously been lost to the Mamluks.
- December 22–23 – Battle of Wadi al-Khaznadar: Mongol forces under Ghazan Khan defeat a Mamluk army (some 30,000 men) north of Homs. Sultan Al-Nasir Muhammad flees with the remnants of his army to Damascus. Ghazan splits his forces, one part sacks Damascus and besieges the citadel. Another part pursues the retreating Mamluks as far as Gaza, pushing them back to Egypt.

====== Asia ======
- Spring – Mongol invasion of India: Duwa Khan, Mongol ruler of the Chagatai Khanate, sends his sons Qutlugh Khwaja and Duwa Temür with an army of some 50,000 horsemen over the border. The Mongols bypass villages to maximize speed, intending to strike directly at Delhi itself. At the Jumna River, Mongol forces under Qutlugh defeated Zafar Khan, and are forced to retreat to Delhi. News of the defeat causes thousands to abandon their homes, the capital is soon flooded with refugees. The streets, the markets and the mosques become overcrowded. Meanwhile, the merchant caravans headed for Delhi are interrupted by the Mongols.
- February 25 – Sultan Alauddin Khalji orders the army (some 35,000 men) to prepare for the march to Gujarat. One part of the army under Nusrat Khan starts its march from Delhi. Another part, led by Ulugh Khan, marches from Sindh and attacks Jaisalmer along the way. When the army returns from raiding Gujarat, Mongol soldiers stage a mutiny over payment of khums (one-fifth of the share of loot). The mutiny is crushed, the mutineer families in Delhi are punished and executed.
- Mongol invasion of India: Battle of Kili: Alauddin Khalji raises forces (some 70,000 men with 700 elephants) and attacks the Mongols under Qutlugh Khwaja north of Delhi. Zafar Khan, looking to avenge his defeat on the River Jumna, leads the first charge, attacking the Mongol left flank, which breaks before him. Zafar gives chase to drive them from the field – but he is ambushed by a feigned retreat. He is captured and executed with all his men. Qutlugh is wounded in battle and dies during the return journey.
- May 10 – King Kyawswa of Pagan and his son, Crown Prince Theingapati, are executed at Myinsaing, by the three brothers of the Myinsaing Kingdom (nominally Kyawswa's viceroys), for submitting and being a vassal to the Mongol-led Yuan dynasty (since 1297).
- July 27 – Osman I (or Othman) declares the Anatolian beylik (principality) to be independent of the Seljuk Sultanate of Rum, originating the Ottoman Empire. Osman becomes the founder and the first ruler, with Söğüt as the capital, which will last until the 1920s.
- The Kingdom of Singapura is founded by Sang Nila Utama, a Srivijaya prince. Upon his coronation, he adopts the official title Sri Tri Buana (translated as "Lord of Three Worlds").

==== By topic ====
====== Cities and towns ======
- April 1 – Kingston upon Hull is granted city status in England by royal charter of Edward I.

====== Literature ======
- Approximate date – Rustichello da Pisa completes taking down The Travels of Marco Polo from Marco while they are both imprisoned in Genoa.

====== Markets ======
- King Edward I of England is recorded as borrowing from Italian merchants. He obtains a loan of 2,000 pollard marks, from agents of the Frescobaldi Firm in London.

====== Religion ======
- June 27 – Pope Boniface VIII issues the papal bull "Scimus, Fili" condemning Edward I of England's invasion and occupation of Scotland.

====== Science and technology ======
- The spinning wheel is now in widespread use in England for manufacturing woolen yarn.

== Births ==
1290

- January 3 – Constance of Portugal, queen consort of Castile (d. 1313)
- January 6 – Otto Bodrugan, English landowner and politician (d. 1331)
- June 23 – Jakushitsu Genkō, Japanese Rinzai master and poet (d. 1367)
- August 4 – Leopold I, Duke of Austria ("the Glorious"), German nobleman (d. 1326)
- October 15 – Anne of Bohemia, queen consort of Bohemia (d. 1313)
- December 24 – Khwaju Kermani, Persian poet and mystic (d. 1349)
- Agnes Haakonsdatter, Norwegian noblewoman and princess (d. 1319)
- Andrea Pisano (or Pontedera), Italian sculptor and architect (d. 1348)
- Barlaam of Seminara, Italian cleric, scholar and theologian (d. 1348)
- Beatrice of Silesia, queen of Germany (House of Piast) (d. 1322)
- Buton Rinchen Drub, Tibetan Buddhist religious leader (d. 1364)
- Daichi Sokei, Japanese Buddhist monk, disciple and poet (d. 1366)
- Giovanni Visconti, Italian cardinal, archbishop and co-ruler (d. 1354)
- Guido Gonzaga, Italian nobleman and knight (condottiero) (d. 1369)
- Hugues Quiéret, French nobleman, admiral and advisor (d. 1340)
- Jacob van Artevelde, Flemish merchant and statesman (d. 1345)
- Jacopo Dondi dell'Orologio, Italian doctor and polymath (d. 1359)
- Johannes de Muris, French mathematician and astronomer (d. 1344)
- John Maltravers, English nobleman, knight and governor (d. 1364)
- John Parricida, German nobleman (House of Habsburg) (d. 1312)
- Jyotirishwar Thakur, Indian playwright, poet and writer (d. 1350)
- Ke Jiusi, Chinese landscape painter and calligrapher (d. 1343)
- Kitabatake Tomoyuki, Japanese nobleman and poet (d. 1332)
- Kujō Fusazane, Japanese nobleman, official and regent (d. 1327)
- Peter of Castile, Lord of Cameros, Spanish nobleman and prince (infante) (d. 1319)
- Pierre Bersuire (or Bercheure), French translator and encyclopaedist (d. 1362)
- Rabbenu Yerucham, French rabbi and scholar (posek) (d. 1350)
- Richard de Willoughby, English landowner and politician (d. 1362)
- Rudolf Hesso, Margrave of Baden-Baden, German nobleman (House of Zähringen) (d. 1335)
- Sesson Yūbai, Japanese Buddhist monk, priest and poet (d. 1347)
- Theodore I, Marquis of Montferrat ("Palaiologos"), Byzantine nobleman and writer (d. 1338)
- Willem van Duvenvoorde, Dutch nobleman and knight (d. 1353)

1291

- February 8 – Afonso IV ("the Brave"), king of Portugal (d. 1357)
- March 9 – Cangrande I della Scala, Italian nobleman (d. 1329)
- May 10 – Gilbert de Clare, English nobleman and knight (d. 1314)
- August 12 – Ichijō Uchitsune, Japanese nobleman (kugyō) (d. 1325)
- September 23 – Bolesław III, Polish nobleman and knight (d. 1352)
- October 31 – Philippe de Vitry, French musician and poet (d. 1361)
- December 15 – Aymon ("the Peaceful"), Savoyan nobleman (d. 1343)
- December 20 – Margareta Ebner, German nun and mystic (d. 1351)
- Hugh de Audley, English nobleman, knight and diplomat (d. 1347)
- Luis de la Cerda, French nobleman, prince and admiral (d. 1348)
- Luitgard of Wittichen, German nun, abbess and mystic (d. 1348)
- Marie of Artois, French noblewoman (House of Artois) (d. 1365)
- Tōin Kinkata, Japanese official, historian and writer (d. 1360)

1292

- January 20 – Elizabeth of Bohemia, queen consort of Bohemia (d. 1330)
- January 29 – Ibn Qayyim al-Jawziyya, Syrian polymath (d. 1350)
- May 28 – Philip of Castile, Spanish nobleman and prince (d. 1327)
- June 24 – Otto the Mild, German nobleman and knight (d. 1344)
- August 25 – Chu Văn An, Vietnamese physician and mandarin (d. 1370)
- October 3 – Eleanor de Clare, English noblewoman (d. 1337)
- Dolpopa Sherab Gyaltsen, Tibetan religious leader (d. 1361)
- Elisenda of Montcada, queen consort and regent of Aragon (d. 1364)
- Evrard d'Orleans, French Gothic sculptor and painter (d. 1357)
- Gerhard III ("the Great"), German nobleman and prince (d. 1340)
- Henry IV the Faithful, Polish nobleman and knight (d. 1342)
- Henry Burghersh, English bishop and statesman (d. 1340)
- John VI Kantakouzenos, Byzantine emperor (d. 1383)
- John Grandisson, English chaplain and bishop (d. 1369)
- John Marmion, Norman nobleman and knight (d. 1335)
- Richard of Wallingford, English mathematician (d. 1336)
- Robert de Stratford, English bishop and chancellor (d. 1362)
- Saionji Neishi (or Yasuko), Japanese court lady (d. 1337)
- Siemowit of Bytom, Polish nobleman and knight (d. 1342)

1293

- John of Ruysbroeck, Brabantian mystic (approximate date; d. 1381)
- Margaret de Clare, English noblewoman (d. 1342)
- Fedlim Ó Conchobair, King of Connacht (d. 1316)
- Philip V of France (d. 1322)
- Philip VI of France (d. 1350)
- Walter Stewart, 6th High Steward of Scotland (d. 1326)

1294

- June 18 or June 19 – Charles IV of France (d. 1328)
- John, Duke of Durazzo (d. 1336)
- date unknown – Kusunoki Masashige, Japanese samurai (d. 1336)
  - Joan of Valois, Countess of Hainaut (d. 1342)

1295 some dates approximate

- March 21 – Henry Suso, German priest, mystic and writer (d. 1366)
- September 16 – Elizabeth de Clare, English noblewoman (d. 1360)
- Catherine of Austria, German noblewoman and princess (d. 1323)
- Egill Eyjólfsson, Icelandic deacon, scholar and bishop (d. 1341)
- Giovanni Colonna, Italian cardinal (House of Colonna) (d. 1348)
- Hōjō Moritoki, Japanese nobleman and regent (shikken) (d. 1333)
- Joanna of Flanders, Flemish noblewoman and regent (d. 1374)
- John III, French nobleman and knight (House of Dreux) (d. 1331)
- John of Montfort, French nobleman (House of Montfort) (d. 1345)
- Juan Alfonso de la Cerda, French nobleman and knight (d. 1347)
- Margaret of Valois, French noblewoman and princess (d. 1342)
- Nicephorus Gregoras, Byzantine historian and writer (d. 1360)
- Nijō Tameakira, Japanese nobleman and waka poet (d. 1364)
- Odo IV, Duke of Burgundy (or Eudes), French nobleman and knight (d. 1349)
- Reginald II, Duke of Guelders ("the Black"), Dutch nobleman and regent (d. 1343)
- Reynold Cobham, English nobleman and diplomat (d. 1361)
- Robert de Eglesfield, English nobleman and chaplain (d. 1349)
- Takatsukasa Fuyunori, Japanese nobleman and regent (d. 1337)
- Vitalis of Assisi, Italian Benedictine monk and hermit (d. 1370)

1296

- August 10 – "Blind" King John I of Bohemia (d. 1346)
- December – Marjorie Bruce, Scottish princess, only daughter of Robert I of Scotland (d. 1316)
- date unknown
  - Charles of Taranto (d. 1315)
  - Gregory Palamas, Archbishop of Thessalonica (d. 1359)
  - Roland of Sicily, Italian nobleman (d. 1361)
- probable
  - Algirdas, ruler of Lithuania (d. 1377)
  - Blanche of Burgundy, queen consort of France (d. 1326)
  - Shi Naian, Chinese author (d. 1370)
  - Tamagusuku, ruler of Chuzan

1297

- March 25
  - Andronikos III Palaiologos, Byzantine emperor (d. 1341)
  - Arnošt of Pardubice, Czech archbishop and advisor (d. 1364)
- July 8 – Tarabya I of Sagaing, Burmese ruler (Myinsaing Kingdom) (d. 1339)
- August 14 – Hanazono, Japanese emperor and poet (d. 1348)
- Abu al-Hasan Ali ibn Othman, Marinid ruler of Morocco (d. 1351)
- Bernardo Canaccio, Italian nobleman, poet and writer (d. 1360)
- Charles II, Count of Alençon ("Magnanimous"), French nobleman and knight (d. 1346)
- Ernest I, Duke of Brunswick-Grubenhagen, German nobleman and prince (House of Welf) (d. 1361)
- Ingeborg Eriksdottir, Norwegian princess and co-regent (d. 1357)
- Isabella of Sabran, Spanish noblewoman and princess (d. 1315)
- Kęstutis, Grand Duke of Lithuania (House of Gediminids) (d. 1382)
- Mary de Monthermer (or MacDuff), English noblewoman (d. 1371)
- Thomas Wake, 2nd Baron Wake of Liddell, English nobleman, governor and knight (d. 1349)
- Yanagiwara Sukeakira, Japanese nobleman (kugyō) (d. 1353)

1298

- August 9 – Robert Ufford, English nobleman and admiral (d. 1369)
- August 25 – Gongwon, Korean queen consort of Goryeo (d. 1380)
- December 12 – Albert II, Duke of Austria ("the Lame"), German nobleman (d. 1358)
- Andrew Murray, Scottish nobleman, knight and politician (d. 1338)
- Angelo Acciaioli, Italian nobleman, cleric, friar and bishop (d. 1357)
- Bernat II de Cabrera, Aragonese nobleman and diplomat (d. 1364)
- Charles of Calabria, Italian nobleman and Vicar-General (d. 1328)
- Edmond de Burgh, Norman nobleman (House of Burgh) (d. 1338)
- Elizabeth of Carinthia, Sicilian queen consort and regent (d. 1352)
- Everhard II of Limburg, German nobleman and co-ruler (d. 1344)
- Kunigunde of Poland, Polish princess (House of Piast) (d. 1331)
- Peter I of Dreux, French nobleman (House of Dreux) (d. 1345)
- Qvarqvare I, Georgian nobleman and prince (mtavari) (d. 1361)
- Zhou Boqi, Chinese magistrate, calligrapher and poet (d. 1369)

1299

- May 15 – Henry the Friendly, German nobleman and knight (d. 1327)
- June 24 – John de Verdon, English nobleman and knight (d. 1376)
- August 15 – Ralph de Greystoke, English landowner (d. 1323)
- November 1 – Elizabeth de Comyn, English noblewoman (d. 1372)
- November 2 – Alfonso IV ("the Gentle"), king of Aragon (d. 1336)
- unknown dates
  - Akashi Kakuichi, Japanese Buddhist monk and musician (d. 1371)
  - Dmitry of Tver, Russian nobleman and Grand Prince (d. 1326)
  - Galeotto I Malatesta, Italian nobleman and knight (condottiero) (d. 1385)
  - Henry II, Landgrave of Hesse ("the Iron"), German nobleman and regent (d. 1376)

== Deaths ==
1290

- January 28 – Dervorguilla of Galloway, Scottish noblewoman (b. 1210)
- February 3 – Henry XIII, Duke of Bavaria, German nobleman, co-ruler and knight (b. 1235)
- March 24 – John dal Bastone, Italian monk, priest and preacher (b. 1200)
- March 26 – John Kirkby, English bishop, vice-chancellor and statesman
- April 26 – Gaston VII, Viscount of Béarn ("Froissard"), French nobleman and knight (b. 1225)
- May 10 – Rudolf II, Duke of Austria, German nobleman (House of Habsburg) (b. 1270)
- June 8 – Beatrice Portinari, Italian muse of Dante (b. 1266)
- June 13 – Shamsuddin II, Mamluk ruler of the Delhi Sultanate (b. 1285)
- June 23 – Henryk IV Probus ("the Righteous"), High Duke of Poland (b. 1258)
- July 10 – Ladislaus IV ("the Cuman"), king of Hungary and Croatia (b. 1262)
- September 26 – Margaret, Maid of Norway, queen of Scotland (b. 1283)
- November 10 – Qalawun ("the Victorious"), Mamluk ruler of Egypt (b. 1222)
- November 28 – Eleanor of Castile, queen consort of England (b. 1241)
- December 18
  - Herman I, German nobleman (House of Henneberg) (b. 1224)
  - Magnus Birgersson, king of Sweden (b. 1240)
- December 21 – Gerhard I, Count of Holstein-Itzehoe, German nobleman, knight and regent (b. 1232)
- Adelaide, Countess of Auxerre, French noblewoman and ruler (suo jure) (b. 1251)
- Alice de Lusignan, Countess of Gloucester, French noblewoman (House of Lusignan) (b. 1236)
- Cecilia Cesarini (or Caecilia), Italian noblewoman and nun (b. 1203)
- Eison, Japanese Buddhist scholar-monk, disciple and priest (b. 1201)
- Elizabeth the Cuman, queen of Hungary (House of Arpad) (b. 1244)
- Fakhr al-Din Mustawfi, Persian finance minister, advisor and vizier

1291

- March 5 – Sa'ad al-Dawla, Persian physician and vizier (b. 1240)
- March 10 – Arghun Khan, Mongol ruler of the Ilkhanate (b. 1258)
- March 16 – Alauddin Sabir Kaliyari, Indian Sufi preacher (b. 1196)
- May 11 – Thomas Ingoldsthorpe, English archdeacon and bishop
- May 18 – Matthew of Clermont, French nobleman and Marshal
- May 25 – Bengt Birgersson, Swedish duke and bishop (b. 1254)
- June 5 – John I, German nobleman (House of Ascania) (b. 1260)
- June 18 – Alfonso III (or II; "the Liberal"), king of Aragon (b. 1265)
- June 25 – Eleanor of Provence, queen consort of England (b. 1223)
- June 27 – Tanhum of Jerusalem, Outremer lexicographer (b. 1220)
- July – Muzaffar al-Din Hajjaj, Qutlughkhanid prince and co-ruler (b. 1247)
- July 12 – Herman VII, Margrave of Baden-Baden ("the Rouser"), German nobleman (b. 1266)
- July 15 – Rudolf I, king of Germany (House of Habsburg) (b. 1218)
- August 16 – Frederick Tuta, German nobleman and regent (b. 1269)
- October 8 – Henry I of Werle, German nobleman, prince and knight (b. 1245)
- December 11 – Francesco Lippi, Italian monk and hermit (b. 1211)
- Alfonso de Castilla y Molina, Castilian nobleman and prince (infante) (b. 1286)
- Badr al-Din Solamish, Mamluk ruler of Egypt and Syria (b. 1272)
- Guy de Montfort, English nobleman and Vicar-General (b. 1244)
- Hong Ta-gu (or Jun-gi), Korean ruler and military leader (b. 1244)
- Niall Culanach O'Neill (or Culanagh), Irish king of Tír Eoghain, killed (b. 1231)
- Nuño González II, Castilian nobleman and knight (House of Lara)
- Philip Marmion, 5th Baron Marmion of Tamworth, Norman King's Champion, High Sheriff and knight
- William de Braose, 1st Baron Braose, Norman nobleman (House of Braose) (b. 1224)
- Guillaume de Beaujeu, French nobleman and Grand Master (b. 1230)

1292

- February 6 – William VII, Italian nobleman and knight (b. 1240)
- February 10 – Maurice VI de Craon, French nobleman (b. 1255)
- February 28 – Hugh de Courtenay, English nobleman (b. 1251)
- April 4 – Nicholas IV, Italian pope of the Catholic Church (b. 1227)
- April 16 – Thibaud Gaudin, French nobleman and Grand Master
- May 2 – Conrad II, German nobleman (House of Teck) (b. 1235)
- May 8 – Amato Ronconi, Italian monk, hermit and saint (b. 1226)
- June 2 – Rhys ap Maredudd, Welsh nobleman and prince (b. 1250)
- July 24 – Kinga of Poland, Hungarian princess and abbess (b. 1224)
- September 25 – Alice of Saluzzo, Countess of Arundel, Savoyan noblewoman and co-ruler
- September 30 – William I, Duke of Brunswick-Lüneburg, German nobleman and co-ruler (b. 1270)
- October 3 – Benvenuta Bojani, Italian nun, mystic and saint (b. 1254)
- October 14 – John of Flanders, Flemish nobleman and prince-bishop
- October 20 – Saionji Kisshi (or Ōmiya-in), empress of Japan (b. 1225)
- October 25 – Robert Burnell, English bishop and chancellor (b. 1239)
- November 4 – Euphrosyne of Opole, Polish noblewoman and regent
- December 8 – John Peckham, English archbishop and writer (b. 1230)
- Abraham Abulafia, Spanish scholar, philosopher and writer (b. 1240)
- As-Suwaydi, Syrian physician, pharmacologist and writer (b. 1204)
- Beatrice of Savoy, Lady of Villena, Savoyan noblewoman (House of Savoy) (b. 1250)
- Bernard of Trilia, French monk, theologian and philosopher (b. 1240)
- Darmabala ("Protector of the Law"), Mongolian nobleman (b. 1264)
- Gertrude of Hackeborn, German noblewoman and abbess (b. 1232)
- Guiraut Riquier de Narbona, French troubadour and writer (b. 1230)
- Ingeborg of Sweden, Swedish princess (House of Bjälbo) (b. 1263)
- Marjorie, Countess of Carrick (or Margaret), Scottish noblewoman (suo jure) (b. 1256)
- Roger Bacon, English monk, philosopher and scientist (b. 1220)

1293

- May 2 – Meir of Rothenburg, German rabbi (b. c.1215)
- June 29 – Henry of Ghent, philosopher (b. c.1217)
- November 10 – Isabella de Forz, Countess of Devon (b. 1237)
- December 14 – Al-Ashraf Khalil, Mamluk sultan of Egypt (assassinated)
- date unknown
  - David VI Narin, King of Georgia (b. 1225)
  - William of Rubruck, Flemish Franciscan missionary (approximate date; b. c.1220)

1294

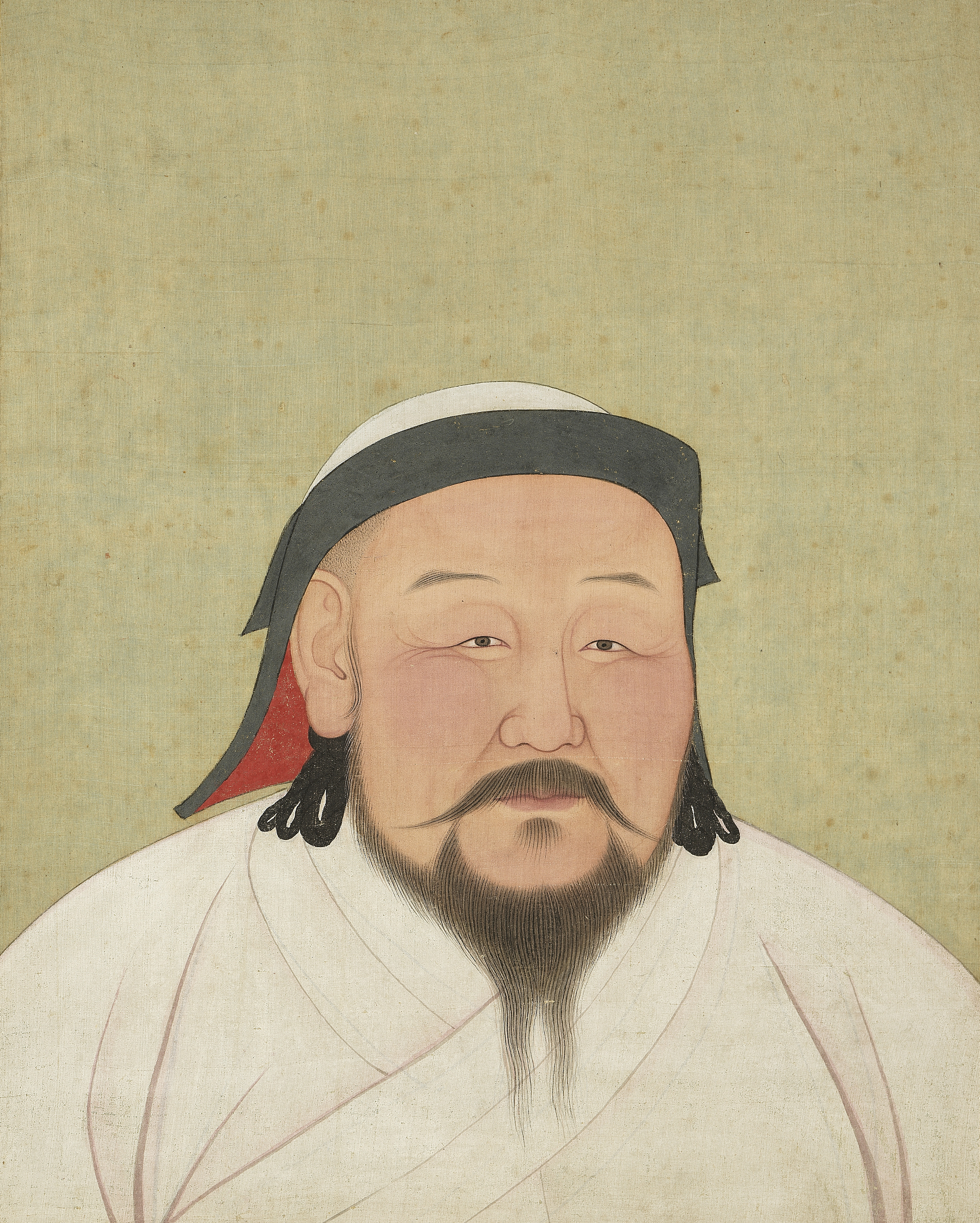
Kublai Khan

- February 18 – Kublai Khan of the Mongol Empire (b. 1215)
- May 3 – John I, Duke of Brabant
- June 12 – John I of Brienne, Count of Eu
- December 25 – Mestwin II, Duke of Pomerania
- date unknown
  - Emperor Yagbe'u Seyon of Ethiopia
  - Brunetto Latini, Florentine philosopher (b. c. 1220)
  - Dmitri of Pereslavl, Grand Duke of Vladimir-Suzdal

1295

- January 2 – Agnes of Baden, Duchess of Carinthia, German noblewoman (b. 1250)
- January 11 – Bayan of the Baarin, Mongol general (b. 1236)
- March 21 – Gaykhatu, Mongol ruler of the Ilkhanate (b. 1259)
- March 31 – Robert V de Brus, Scottish nobleman (b. 1215)
- April 10 – Baldwin of Avesnes, French nobleman (b. 1219)
- April 25 – Sancho IV ("the Brave"), king of Castile (b. 1258)
- May 28 – Barnim II, Polish nobleman and co-ruler (b. 1277)
- August 1 – Pietro Peregrosso, Italian scholar and cardinal
- August 8 – Ottone Visconti, Italian canon and archbishop
- August 12 – Charles Martel, titular king of Hungary (b. 1271)
- September 15 – Ruggieri degli Ubaldini, Italian archbishop
- October 4 – Baydu, Mongol ruler of the Ilkhanate (b. 1255)
- November 10 – Nicholas Segrave, 1st Baron Segrave, English nobleman (b. 1238)
- December 7 – Gilbert de Clare, 7th Earl of Gloucester, English nobleman (b. 1243)
- December 16 – Roger de Meyland, English sheriff and bishop
- December 20 – Margaret of Provence, queen consort of France (b. 1221)
- Anna of Greater Poland, Polish princess and abbess (b. 1253)
- Beatrice of Navarre, French noblewoman and regent (b. 1242)
- Fenenna of Kuyavia (or Kujawska), queen consort of Hungary (b. 1276)
- Nicholas of Gorran, French preacher and theologian (b. 1232)
- Padishah Khatun, Mongol female ruler and writer (b. 1256)

1296

- February 8 – King Przemysł II of Poland (b. 1257)
- March 11 – John le Romeyn, Archbishop of York
- March 24 – Odon de Pins, French Grand Master of the Knights Hospitaller
- May – William de Valence, 1st Earl of Pembroke
- May 17 – Agnes of Bohemia, Duchess of Austria (b. 1269)
- May 19 – Pope Celestine V (b. 1215)
- June 5 – Edmund Crouchback, 1st Earl of Lancaster, son of Henry III of England (b. 1245)
- June 27 – Floris V, Count of Holland (b. 1254)
- August 7 – Heinrich II von Rotteneck, prince-bishop of Regensburg
- August 9 – Hugh, Count of Brienne, French crusader
- October 9 – Louis III, Duke of Bavaria (b. 1269)
- November 1 – Guillaume Durand, French canonist and writer
- December
  - Isabella of Mar, Scottish countess, spouse of Robert I of Scotland
  - Adam de Darlington, Bishop of Caithness (approximate date)
- date unknown
  - Philippe de Rémi, French lawyer and royal official (b. c. 1247)
  - Campanus of Novara, Italian astronomer and mathematician (b. c. 1220)
  - Dnyaneshwar, Hindu saint and poet (b. 1275)
  - Jalal ud din Firuz Khalji, founder of the Khalji dynasty in India
  - Tarabya of Pegu, self-proclaimed ruler
  - Robert de Vere, 5th Earl of Oxford (b. c.1240)

1297

- January 23 – Florent of Hainaut, Latin prince of Achaea (b. 1255)
- February 22 – Margaret of Cortona, Italian nun and saint (b. 1247)
- April 7 – Siegfried II of Westerburg, German nobleman and archbishop (b. 1258)
- May 21 – Judith of Habsburg, Bohemian queen consort (b. 1271)
- June 11 – Jeguk (Jangmok), Korean princess and queen consort (b. 1259)
- June 27 – Bérard de Got, French cardinal, bishop and diplomat
- August 13 – Gertrude of Aldenberg, German noblewoman (b. 1227)
- August 14 – Frederick III, Burgrave of Nuremberg, German nobleman and knight (b. 1220)
- August 16 – John II, Byzantine emperor of Trebizond (b. 1262)
- August 18 – Simon de Beaulieu, French nobleman and bishop
- August 19 – Louis of Toulouse, Neapolitan archbishop (b. 1274)
- August 20 – William Fraser, Scottish monk, chancellor and bishop
- September 11 – Hugh de Cressingham, English advisor and knight
- November 21 – Roger de Mowbray, English nobleman (b. 1254)
- December 28 – Hugh Aycelin, French priest and cardinal (b. 1230)
- Andrew Moray (or de Moray), Scottish nobleman and rebel leader
- Hesso, Margrave of Baden-Baden, German nobleman, co-ruler and knight (b. 1268)
- Louis of Brienne, French nobleman and knight (County of Brienne)
- Muktabai (or Mukta), Indian religious leader and mystic (b. 1279)
- Nikephoros I Komnenos Doukas, Latin ruler (despot) of Epirus
- Radulphus de Canaberiis, French nobleman, teacher and canon
- Richard FitzJohn, English nobleman, judge, constable and knight
- Roger de Montalt, Norman nobleman and rebel leader (b. 1265)

1298

- January 2 – Lodomer, Hungarian prelate and archbishop
- March 14 – Peter John Olivi, French theologian (b. 1248)
- March 25 – Siegfried I, Prince of Anhalt-Zerbst, German prince (House of Ascania)
- March 25 or March 27 – William of Louth (or de Luda), English bishop
- April 8 – Andrew Moray, Scottish nobleman and justiciar
- April 17
  - Albrecht II, Count of Hohenberg-Rotenburg, German nobleman and governor (b. 1235)
  - Árni Þorláksson, Icelandic cleric and bishop (b. 1237)
- May 4 – Frederick VI, Count of Zollern, German nobleman, knight and co-ruler
- May 22 – Robert de Tiptoft, Norman landowner and governor
- June 11 – Yolanda of Poland, Hungarian princess (b. 1235)
- July 2 – Adolf of Nassau, king of Germany (House of Nassau)
- July 13 or July 16 – Jacobus de Voragine, Italian archbishop
- July 22
  - John de Graham, Scottish nobleman (Clan Graham)
  - John Stewart, Scottish nobleman (Clan Stewart)
  - Macduff of Fife, Scottish nobleman (Clan MacDuff)
- July 23 – Thoros III (or Toros), king of Cilician Armenia (b. 1271)
- August 1 – Mordechai ben Hillel, German Jewish rabbi (b. 1250)
- August 25 – Albert II, Duke of Saxony, German nobleman and co-ruler
- August 28 – William Houghton, English diplomat and archbishop
- August 29 – Eleanor of England, Countess of Bar, daughter of Edward I (b. 1269)
- September 9 – Andrea Dandolo, Venetian nobleman and admiral
- September 29 – Guido I da Montefeltro, Italian military strategist
- December 31 – Humphrey de Bohun, 3rd Earl of Hereford, English nobleman (b. 1249)
- Aimery IV of Narbonne, Italian nobleman and knight (condottiero)
- Elisabeth of Wetzikon, Swiss noblewoman and abbess (b. 1235)
- Euphrosyne of Greater Poland, Polish princess (House of Piast)
- Ibn Wasil, Ayyubid scholar, judge, diplomat and writer (b. 1208)
- Jacopo del Cassero, Italian nobleman and magistrate (b. 1260)
- John of Genoa (Johannes Balbus), Italian priest, grammarian and writer
- John of Procida, Italian scholar, physician and diplomat (b. 1210)
- Lourenço Soares de Valadares, Portuguese nobleman (b. 1230)
- Mugai Nyodai, Japanese nun, abbess and Zen Master (b. 1223)
- Otto V ("the Tall"), German nobleman, knight and regent (b. 1246)
- Smilets of Bulgaria, Bulgarian emperor (tsar) (House of Smilets)
- Thomas the Rhymer, Scottish nobleman (laird), knight and poet
- Thomas Weyland, English landowner, lawyer and administrator
- William de Beauchamp, 9th Earl of Warwick, English nobleman and knight (b. 1238)
- William le Hardi, Lord of Douglas ("the Bold"), Scottish nobleman and warlord
- Yang Hui (or Qianguang), Chinese mathematician and writer
- Yaqut al-Musta'simi, Abbasid eunuch, calligrapher and writer

1299

- January 16 – Lajin, Egyptian ruler of the Mamluk Sultanate
- April 10 – Malik ibn al-Murahhal, Moroccan poet (b. 1207)
- May 10
  - Kyawswa, Burmese ruler of the Pagan Kingdom (b. 1260)
  - Theingapati, Burmese prince and heir (Pagan Kingdom)
- May 17 – Daumantas of Pskov, Lithuanian prince (b. 1240)
- July 15 – Eric II (Magnusson), king of Norway (b. 1268)
- August 1
  - Conrad of Lichtenberg, German bishop (b. 1240)
  - Wolfert I van Borselen, Dutch nobleman and regent
- August 15 – Henry of Newark, English clerk and archbishop
- September 23 – Nicolas de Nonancourt, French chancellor
- October 8 – Jakuen, Japanese disciple and scholar (b. 1207)
- October 12 – John II, German nobleman, knight and regent
- November 10 – John I of Holland, Dutch nobleman (b. 1284)
- November 19 – Mechtilde, German noblewoman and mystic
- December 9 – Bohemond I, German knight and archbishop
- December 31
  - Margaret of Anjou, French noblewoman (b. 1272)
  - Ralph Basset, English nobleman and governor
