= 1292 =

1292 in various calendars
- Gregorian calendar: 1292; MCCXCII
- Ab urbe condita: 2045
- Armenian calendar: 741; ԹՎ ՉԽԱ
- Assyrian calendar: 6042
- Balinese saka calendar: 1213–1214
- Bengali calendar: 698–699
- Berber calendar: 2242
- English Regnal year: 20 Edw. 1 – 21 Edw. 1
- Buddhist calendar: 1836
- Burmese calendar: 654
- Byzantine calendar: 6800–6801
- Chinese calendar: 辛卯年 (Metal Rabbit); 3989 or 3782 — to — 壬辰年 (Water Dragon); 3990 or 3783
- Coptic calendar: 1008–1009
- Discordian calendar: 2458
- Ethiopian calendar: 1284–1285
- Hebrew calendar: 5052–5053
- Hindu calendars
- Vikram Samvat: 1348–1349
- Shaka Samvat: 1213–1214
- Kali Yuga: 4392–4393
- Holocene calendar: 11292
- Igbo calendar: 292–293
- Iranian calendar: 670–671
- Islamic calendar: 691–692
- Japanese calendar: Shōō 5 (正応５年)
- Javanese calendar: 1202–1203
- Julian calendar: 1292; MCCXCII
- Korean calendar: 3625
- Minguo calendar: 620 before ROC 民前620年
- Nanakshahi calendar: −176
- Thai solar calendar: 1834–1835
- Tibetan calendar: ལྕགས་མོ་ཡོས་ལོ་ (female Iron-Hare); 1418 or 1037 or 265 — to — ཆུ་ཕོ་འབྲུག་ལོ་ (male Water-Dragon); 1419 or 1038 or 266

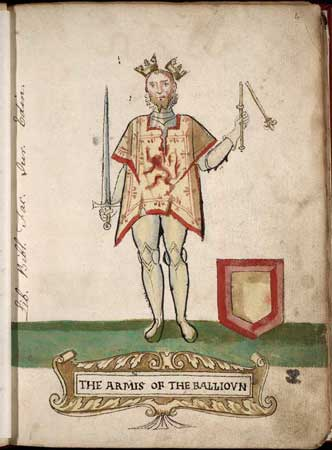
John Balliol, King of Scots 1292–1296

Year 1292 (MCCXCII) was a leap year starting on Tuesday of the Julian calendar.

== Events ==
=== By place ===
==== Asia ====
- Shanghai County is established.
- Kublai Khan sends a Mongol expeditionary force (some 20,000 men) to Java. He collects an invasion fleet with some 500–1,000 ships and enough provisions for a year from Fujian, Jiangxi and Huguang in southern China. The fleet travels past Champa (modern Vietnam) and the Karimata Islands. The Mongols land on Java, taking the capital of Kediri, but it proves impossible to hold.
- King Mangrai the Great of Ngoenyang conquers and annexes the Mon kingdom of Hariphunchai, creating a political union in the form of the Lan Na Kingdom.
- The Vaghela dynasty in Gujarat (located along the western coast of India) is subjugated by the Deccan Seuna (Yadava) dynasty of Daulatabad.
- The Javanese prince, Raden Wijaya, establishes the Majapahit Empire.

==== Britain ====
- November 17 – John Balliol is selected by King Edward I of England as ruler of Scotland at Berwick from among 13 competitors for the Crown of Scotland. Edward then treats John as a puppet ruler and Scotland as a vassal state, provoking the Wars of Scottish Independence, commencing in 1296. John is crowned at Scone on November 30 (Saint Andrew's Day). Scotland's castles are returned to the powerful magnates.
- December – John Balliol is summoned by Edward I to Westminster to answer an appeal by Macduff of Fife against a judgment imposed on him by the Scottish Parliament. John refuses to answer Macduff's appeal, 'without consulting the people of his realm'. Edward asks for compensation for the violation of English law and demands to hand him over three Scottish castles as repayment for the crime committed.

==== Europe ====
- May 5 – The College of Electors select Adolf, count of Nassau, as the new King of the Romans and successor of Habsburg Rudolf I who had died the previous year. Adolf is forced to make wide-ranging concessions to the Electors to get elected. He is crowned king on June 24 in Aachen by the Archbishop of Cologne.
- June 24 – Castilian forces led by King Sancho IV ("the Brave") begin the siege of Tarifa: eleven newly built engines bombard the city constantly by land and sea. Meanwhile, Muhammad II, Nasrid ruler of Granada, provides the army of Sancho with men, arms and also aids the blockade in the Strait of Gibraltar. Muhammad attacks Marinid outposts and his forces seize Estepona on the coast to the west of Málaga. Sancho conquers Tarifa after a siege of four months, on October 13.
- December – Muhammad II sends ambassadors to the Castilian court to ask Sancho IV to surrender Tarifa. Sancho refuses to yield the city to Granada and Muhammad, feeling betrayed, switches sides to form an alliance with the Marinids.

==== Levant ====
- Mamluk forces under Sultan Al-Ashraf Khalil accompanied by his vizier Ibn al-Sal'us arrive in Damascus. Khalil travels via Aleppo to besiege the castle of Rumkale (Qal'at ar-Rum, "Castle of the Romans"), the official seat of Stephen IV, patriarch of Armenia. The Mamluks besiege the castle with more than 30 catapults and capture it after 30 days.
- Al-Ashraf Khalil returns to Damascus and assembles an army to attack Sis, the capital of the Armenian Kingdom of Cilicia. An Armenian embassy arrives in Damascus, and reaches a settlement with Khalil. The cities of Til Hemdun, Marash and Behesni are given to the Mamluks in order to maintain peace.
- November – Michael II becomes Syriac Orthodox patriarch of Antioch (until 1312).

=== By topic ===
==== Religion ====
- Spring – The Taxatio Ecclesiastica, compiled in 1291–1292, is completed under the order of Pope Nicholas IV. It is a detailed database valuation for ecclesiastical taxation of English, Welsh and Irish churches.
- April 4 – Nicholas IV dies after a 4-year pontificate in Rome. The cardinals assemble at Perugia to elect a new pope (1292–1294 papal election).

== Births ==
- January 20 – Elizabeth of Bohemia, queen consort of Bohemia (d. 1330)
- January 29 – Ibn Qayyim al-Jawziyya, Syrian polymath (d. 1350)
- May 28 – Philip of Castile, Spanish nobleman and prince (d. 1327)
- June 24 – Otto the Mild, German nobleman and knight (d. 1344)
- August 25 – Chu Văn An, Vietnamese physician and mandarin (d. 1370)
- October 3 – Eleanor de Clare, English noblewoman (d. 1337)
- Dolpopa Sherab Gyaltsen, Tibetan religious leader (d. 1361)
- Elisenda of Montcada, queen consort and regent of Aragon (d. 1364)
- Evrard d'Orleans, French Gothic sculptor and painter (d. 1357)
- Gerhard III ("the Great"), German nobleman and prince (d. 1340)
- Henry IV the Faithful, Polish nobleman and knight (d. 1342)
- Henry Burghersh, English bishop and statesman (d. 1340)
- John VI Kantakouzenos, Byzantine emperor (d. 1383)
- John Grandisson, English chaplain and bishop (d. 1369)
- John Marmion, Norman nobleman and knight (d. 1335)
- Richard of Wallingford, English mathematician (d. 1336)
- Robert de Stratford, English bishop and chancellor (d. 1362)
- Saionji Neishi (or Yasuko), Japanese court lady (d. 1337)
- Siemowit of Bytom, Polish nobleman and knight (d. 1342)

== Deaths ==
- February 6 – William VII, Italian nobleman and knight (b. 1240)
- February 10 – Maurice VI de Craon, French nobleman (b. 1255)
- February 28 – Hugh de Courtenay, English nobleman (b. 1251)
- April 4 – Nicholas IV, Italian pope of the Catholic Church (b. 1227)
- April 16 – Thibaud Gaudin, French nobleman and Grand Master
- May 2 – Conrad II, German nobleman (House of Teck) (b. 1235)
- May 8 – Amato Ronconi, Italian monk, hermit and saint (b. 1226)
- June 2 – Rhys ap Maredudd, Welsh nobleman and prince (b. 1250)
- July 24 – Kinga of Poland, Hungarian princess and abbess (b. 1224)
- September 25 – Alice of Saluzzo, Countess of Arundel, Savoyan noblewoman and co-ruler
- September 30 – William I, Duke of Brunswick-Lüneburg, German nobleman and co-ruler (b. 1270)
- October 3 – Benvenuta Bojani, Italian nun, mystic and saint (b. 1254)
- October 14 – John of Flanders, Flemish nobleman and prince-bishop
- October 20 – Saionji Kisshi (or Ōmiya-in), empress of Japan (b. 1225)
- October 25 – Robert Burnell, English bishop and chancellor (b. 1239)
- November 4 – Euphrosyne of Opole, Polish noblewoman and regent
- December 8 – John Peckham, English archbishop and writer (b. 1230)
- Abraham Abulafia, Spanish scholar, philosopher and writer (b. 1240)
- As-Suwaydi, Syrian physician, pharmacologist and writer (b. 1204)
- Beatrice of Savoy, Lady of Villena, Savoyan noblewoman (House of Savoy) (b. 1250)
- Bernard of Trilia, French monk, theologian and philosopher (b. 1240)
- Darmabala ("Protector of the Law"), Mongolian nobleman (b. 1264)
- Gertrude of Hackeborn, German noblewoman and abbess (b. 1232)
- Guiraut Riquier de Narbona, French troubadour and writer (b. 1230)
- Ingeborg of Sweden, Swedish princess (House of Bjälbo) (b. 1263)
- Marjorie, Countess of Carrick (or Margaret), Scottish noblewoman (suo jure) (b. 1256)
- Roger Bacon, English monk, philosopher and scientist (b. 1220)
- Kertanagara king of Singhasari
