= 1298 =

1298 in various calendars
- Gregorian calendar: 1298; MCCXCVIII
- Ab urbe condita: 2051
- Armenian calendar: 747; ԹՎ ՉԽԷ
- Assyrian calendar: 6048
- Balinese saka calendar: 1219–1220
- Bengali calendar: 704–705
- Berber calendar: 2248
- English Regnal year: 26 Edw. 1 – 27 Edw. 1
- Buddhist calendar: 1842
- Burmese calendar: 660
- Byzantine calendar: 6806–6807
- Chinese calendar: 丁酉年 (Fire Rooster); 3995 or 3788 — to — 戊戌年 (Earth Dog); 3996 or 3789
- Coptic calendar: 1014–1015
- Discordian calendar: 2464
- Ethiopian calendar: 1290–1291
- Hebrew calendar: 5058–5059
- Hindu calendars
- Vikram Samvat: 1354–1355
- Shaka Samvat: 1219–1220
- Kali Yuga: 4398–4399
- Holocene calendar: 11298
- Igbo calendar: 298–299
- Iranian calendar: 676–677
- Islamic calendar: 697–698
- Japanese calendar: Einin 6 (永仁６年)
- Javanese calendar: 1209–1210
- Julian calendar: 1298; MCCXCVIII
- Korean calendar: 3631
- Minguo calendar: 614 before ROC 民前614年
- Nanakshahi calendar: −170
- Thai solar calendar: 1840–1841
- Tibetan calendar: མེ་མོ་བྱ་ལོ་ (female Fire-Bird); 1424 or 1043 or 271 — to — ས་ཕོ་ཁྱི་ལོ་ (male Earth-Dog); 1425 or 1044 or 272

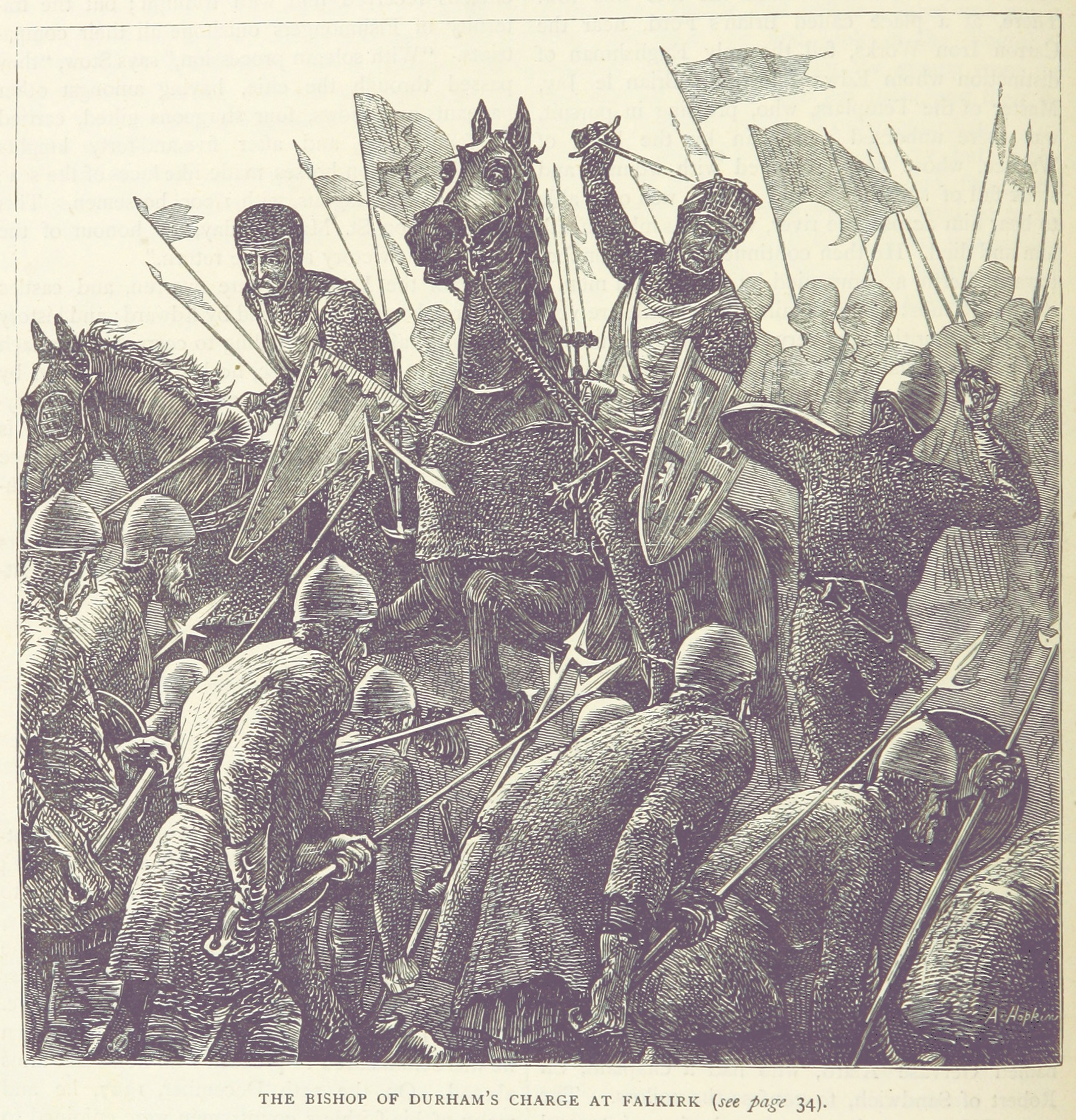
The English cavalry under Antony Bek charges the Scottish forces at Falkirk.

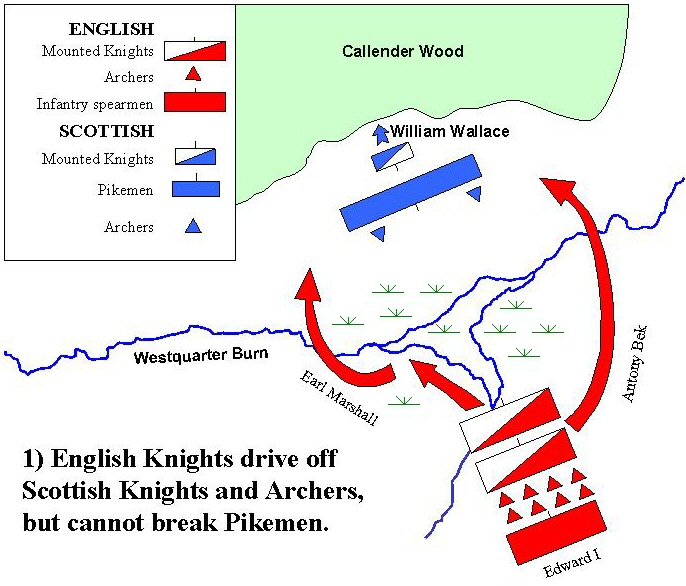
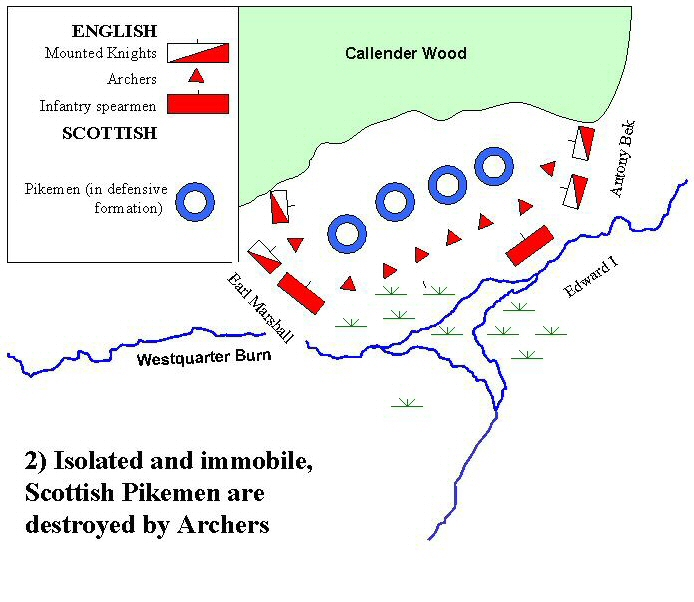

Year 1298 (MCCXCVIII) was a common year starting on Wednesday of the Julian calendar.

== Events ==
=== By place ===
==== Europe ====
- April 20 – Rintfleisch massacres: The Jews of Röttingen are burned en masse. "Lord Boels von Rindtfleisch" (also referred to as a carnifex, i.e. butcher or executioner) goes from town to town and kills all the Jews that fall under his control. He destroys the Jewish communities at Rothenburg ob der Tauber, Würzburg, Bamberg, Dinkelsbühl, Nördlingen and Forchheim. In the Free Imperial City of Nuremberg, the Jews seek refuge in the Nuremberg Castle, assisted by Christian citizens, but Rintfleisch overcomes the defenders and massacres the Jews on August 1. Spreading from Franconia to Bavaria and Austria, Rintfleisch and his followers destroy 146 communities, and between 20,000 and 100,000 Jews are killed.
- June 1 – Battle of Turaida: Forces of the Livonian Order are decisively defeated near Turaida Castle by the residents of Riga, allied with the Grand Duchy of Lithuania under Vytenis. After their defeat, the Livonians receive reinforcements from the Teutonic Order and defeat the residents of Riga and Lithuanians near Neuermühlen, on June 28. The knights proceed with their campaign, and besiege and capture Riga. In response, King Eric VI of Denmark ("Menved") threatens to invade Livonia, but a truce is reached and the conflict is mediated by Pope Boniface VIII.
- July 2 – Battle of Göllheim: German forces of Duke Albert I defeat King Adolf of Nassau at Göllheim over the prince electors' decision, without electoral act – to dethrone Adolf and proclaim Albert the new ruler of Germany at Frankfurt, on July 27. During the battle, Adolf is killed and his army is destroyed with the loss of 3,000 horses.
- September 9 – Battle of Curzola: The Genoese fleet (some 80 galleys) led by Admiral Lamba Doria defeats the Venetian fleet at Curzola. The disaster is almost complete for Venice: 83 of the 95 galleys are destroyed and some 7,000 men are killed. During the battle, Marco Polo, commanding one of the Venetian ships, is captured.
- After a year's siege, the revolting Italian commune of Palestrina near Rome surrenders to the Papal forces, razed to the ground and salted by order of Boniface VIII, in an act of debellatio.

==== British Isles ====
- Summer – First War of Scottish Independence: King Edward I of England ("Longshanks") marches from Newcastle upon Tyne with his household to Alnwick and then by way of Chillingham to Roxburgh in Scotland, where he joins the army in July. He proceeds to Lauderdale and encamps at Kirkliston, to the west of Edinburgh, where he remains from July 15 to July 20. The army is accompanied by a long train of supply wagons. Meanwhile, English supply ships, delayed by bad weather, bring food to Leith.
- July 22 – First War of Scottish Independence: Battle of Falkirk – English forces (some 15,000 men) led by Edward I defeat a Scottish army led by William Wallace at Falkirk. During the battle, the English knights drive off the Scottish horse and archers, but cannot break the pikemen in the center. The Scottish pikemen are formed in four great "hedgehogs" (known as schiltron) but are destroyed by English longbow archers.

==== Asia ====
- Mongol invasion of India (1297–1298): Mongol forces led by Qutlugh Khwaja invade the Sindh region of the Delhi Sultanate and occupy the castle of Sivistan (modern Pakistan). Sultan Alauddin Khalji sends an army under Zafar Khan, who defeats the Mongols, on February 6. Some 20,000 Mongols are killed in the ensuing battle. The survivors are put into chains and brought to Delhi, where they are trampled to death by elephants.
- August 30 – Emperor Fushimi abdicates the throne after an 11-year reign. He is succeeded by his 10-year-old son Go-Fushimi as the 93rd emperor of Japan (until 1301).

=== By topic ===
==== Cities and towns ====
- August 1 – The "ideal city" of Marciac in southern France is founded by King Philip IV ("the Fair") and his Seneschal Guichard de Marzé (or Marciac).

==== Markets ====
- The foreign creditors of the Sienese Gran Tavola Bank start demanding their deposits back, thus accelerating the liquidity crisis faced by the firm.

==== Religion ====
- Pope Boniface VIII issues the decretal Periculoso, requiring all nuns to be in enclosed orders.
- Ambrose, Augustine, Jerome and Pope Gregory I are named the first Doctors of the Church. They are known collectively as the Great Doctors of the Western Church.

==== Technology ====
- Wang Zhen, Chinese inventor and politician, invents a wooden movable type printing (Bi Sheng invented ceramic movable type in the 11th century).

== Births ==
- August 9 – Robert Ufford, English nobleman and admiral (d. 1369)
- August 25 – Gongwon, Korean queen consort of Goryeo (d. 1380)
- December 12 – Albert II, Duke of Austria ("the Lame"), German nobleman (d. 1358)
- Andrew Murray, Scottish nobleman, knight and politician (d. 1338)
- Angelo Acciaioli, Italian nobleman, cleric, friar and bishop (d. 1357)
- Bernat II de Cabrera, Aragonese nobleman and diplomat (d. 1364)
- Charles of Calabria, Italian nobleman and Vicar-General (d. 1328)
- Edmond de Burgh, Norman nobleman (House of Burgh) (d. 1338)
- Elizabeth of Carinthia, Sicilian queen consort and regent (d. 1352)
- Everhard II of Limburg, German nobleman and co-ruler (d. 1344)
- Kunigunde of Poland, Polish princess (House of Piast) (d. 1331)
- Peter I of Dreux, French nobleman (House of Dreux) (d. 1345)
- Qvarqvare I, Georgian nobleman and prince (mtavari) (d. 1361)
- Zhou Boqi, Chinese magistrate, calligrapher and poet (d. 1369)

== Deaths ==
- January 2 – Lodomer, Hungarian prelate and archbishop
- March 14 – Peter John Olivi, French theologian (b. 1248)
- March 25 – Siegfried I, Prince of Anhalt-Zerbst, German prince (House of Ascania)
- March 25 or March 27 – William of Louth (or de Luda), English bishop
- April 8 – Andrew Moray, Scottish nobleman and justiciar
- April 17
  - Albrecht II, Count of Hohenberg-Rotenburg, German nobleman and governor (b. 1235)
  - Árni Þorláksson, Icelandic cleric and bishop (b. 1237)
- May 4 – Frederick VI, Count of Zollern, German nobleman, knight and co-ruler
- May 22 – Robert de Tiptoft, Norman landowner and governor
- June 11 – Yolanda of Poland, Hungarian princess (b. 1235)
- July 2 – Adolf of Nassau, king of Germany (House of Nassau)
- July 13 or July 16 – Jacobus de Voragine, Italian archbishop
- July 22
  - John de Graham, Scottish nobleman (Clan Graham)
  - John Stewart, Scottish nobleman (Clan Stewart)
  - Macduff of Fife, Scottish nobleman (Clan MacDuff)
- July 23 – Thoros III (or Toros), king of Cilician Armenia (b. 1271)
- August 1 – Mordechai ben Hillel, German Jewish rabbi (b. 1250)
- August 25 – Albert II, Duke of Saxony, German nobleman and co-ruler
- August 28 – William Houghton, English diplomat and archbishop
- August 29 – Eleanor of England, Countess of Bar, daughter of Edward I (b. 1269)
- September 9 – Andrea Dandolo, Venetian nobleman and admiral
- September 29 – Guido I da Montefeltro, Italian military strategist
- December 31 – Humphrey de Bohun, 3rd Earl of Hereford, English nobleman (b. 1249)
- Aimery IV of Narbonne, Italian nobleman and knight (condottiero)
- Elisabeth of Wetzikon, Swiss noblewoman and abbess (b. 1235)
- Euphrosyne of Greater Poland, Polish princess (House of Piast)
- Ibn Wasil, Ayyubid scholar, judge, diplomat and writer (b. 1208)
- Jacopo del Cassero, Italian nobleman and magistrate (b. 1260)
- John of Genoa (Johannes Balbus), Italian priest, grammarian and writer
- John of Procida, Italian scholar, physician and diplomat (b. 1210)
- Lourenço Soares de Valadares, Portuguese nobleman (b. 1230)
- Mugai Nyodai, Japanese nun, abbess and Zen Master (b. 1223)
- Otto V ("the Tall"), German nobleman, knight and regent (b. 1246)
- Smilets of Bulgaria, Bulgarian emperor (tsar) (House of Smilets)
- Thomas the Rhymer, Scottish nobleman (laird), knight and poet
- Thomas Weyland, English landowner, lawyer and administrator
- William de Beauchamp, 9th Earl of Warwick, English nobleman and knight (b. 1238)
- William le Hardi, Lord of Douglas ("the Bold"), Scottish nobleman and warlord
- Yang Hui (or Qianguang), Chinese mathematician and writer
- Yaqut al-Musta'simi, Abbasid eunuch, calligrapher and writer
