= 1297 =

1297 in various calendars
- Gregorian calendar: 1297; MCCXCVII
- Ab urbe condita: 2050
- Armenian calendar: 746; ԹՎ ՉԽԶ
- Assyrian calendar: 6047
- Balinese saka calendar: 1218–1219
- Bengali calendar: 703–704
- Berber calendar: 2247
- English Regnal year: 25 Edw. 1 – 26 Edw. 1
- Buddhist calendar: 1841
- Burmese calendar: 659
- Byzantine calendar: 6805–6806
- Chinese calendar: 丙申年 (Fire Monkey); 3994 or 3787 — to — 丁酉年 (Fire Rooster); 3995 or 3788
- Coptic calendar: 1013–1014
- Discordian calendar: 2463
- Ethiopian calendar: 1289–1290
- Hebrew calendar: 5057–5058
- Hindu calendars
- Vikram Samvat: 1353–1354
- Shaka Samvat: 1218–1219
- Kali Yuga: 4397–4398
- Holocene calendar: 11297
- Igbo calendar: 297–298
- Iranian calendar: 675–676
- Islamic calendar: 696–697
- Japanese calendar: Einin 5 (永仁５年)
- Javanese calendar: 1208–1209
- Julian calendar: 1297; MCCXCVII
- Korean calendar: 3630
- Minguo calendar: 615 before ROC 民前615年
- Nanakshahi calendar: −171
- Thai solar calendar: 1839–1840
- Tibetan calendar: མེ་ཕོ་སྤྲེ་ལོ་ (male Fire-Monkey); 1423 or 1042 or 270 — to — མེ་མོ་བྱ་ལོ་ (female Fire-Bird); 1424 or 1043 or 271

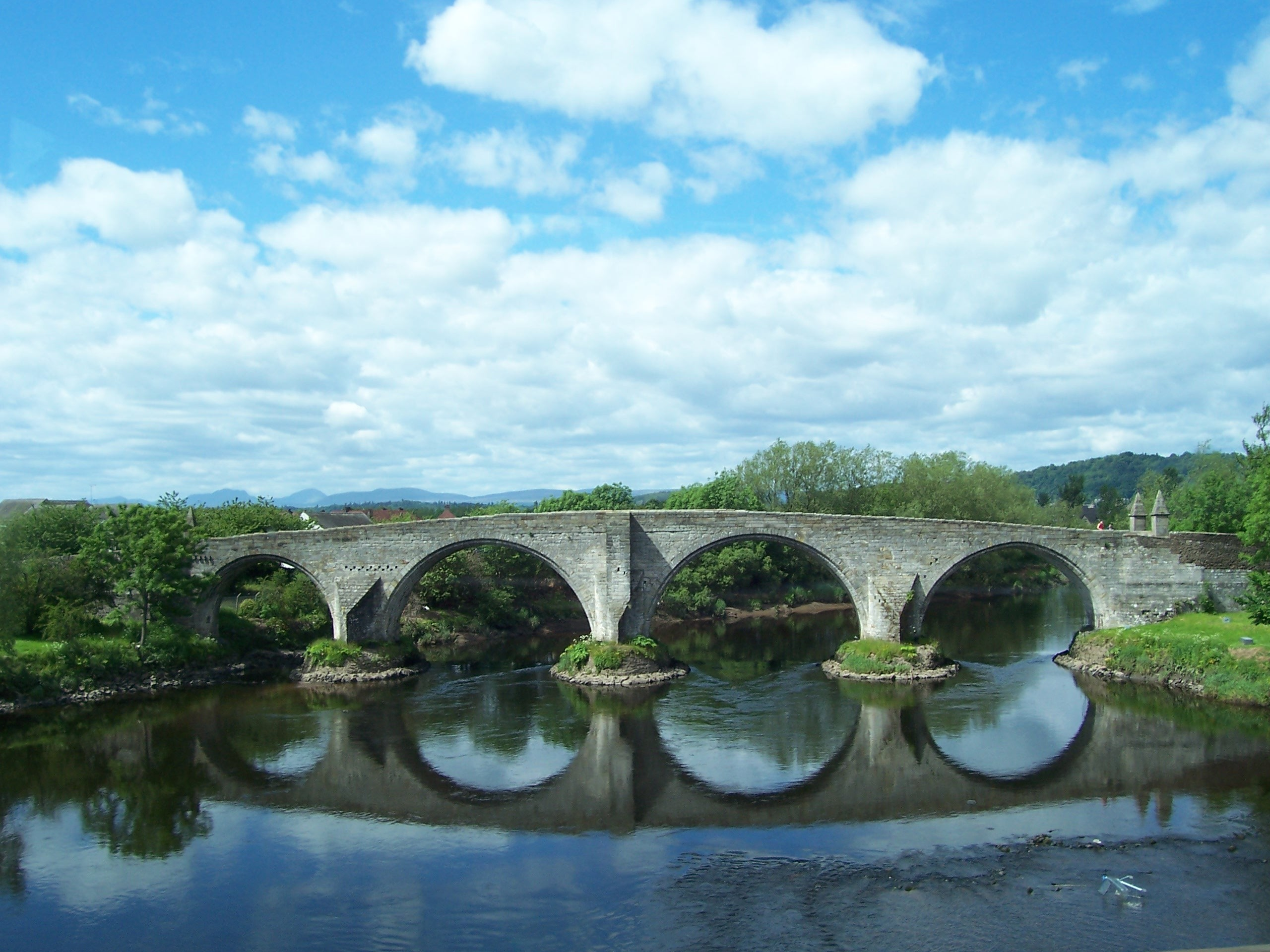
The present-day Stirling Bridge (2006)

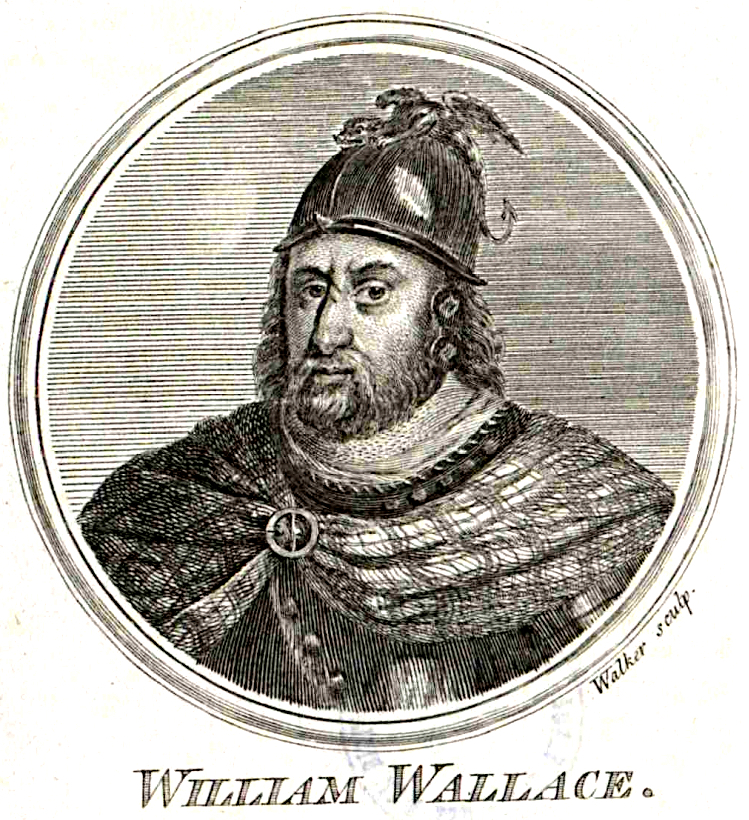
William Wallace (c. 1270–1305)

Year 1297 (MCCXCVII) was a common year starting on Tuesday of the Julian calendar.

== Events ==
=== By place ===
==== Europe ====
- January 8 – Guelph forces, led by the Genoese leader François Grimaldi (il Malizia), storm and capture the Rock of Monaco. François, disguised as a Franciscan friar, gains entry to the city, and opens the gates for his soldiers. He seizes the castle with his stepson Rainier I, an event that is commemorated on the coat of arms of Monaco. Rainier becomes the first sovereign ruler of the House of Grimaldi in Monaco; he rules initially until 1301, but the family will be ruling there into the 21st century.
- Treaty of Alcañices: Kings Denis of Portugal ("the Poet King") and 11-year-old Ferdinand IV of Castile ("the Summoned") (under the guidance of his mother, Queen-Regent Maria de Molina) sign a treaty between Portugal and Castile, which establishes an alliance of friendship and mutual defense, leading to a peace of 40 years between the two kingdoms.
- August 20 – Battle of Furnes: French forces under Robert II defeat the Flemings at Veurne. During the battle, Robert's son Philip of Artois is gravely wounded and dies a year later of his wounds.

==== British Isles ====
- April 14 – King Edward I of England makes an appeal outside Westminster Hall for support for the war against France. He apologizes for the high tax demands he has previously levied. Edward asks the Barons (some 1,500 knights) to swear allegiance to his 12-year-old son, Prince Edward of Caernarfon. Aware of the dangers of the opposition to his power, Edward appears before a large crowd and receives total loyalty.
- May – William Wallace, Scottish rebel leader, leads an uprising against the English at Lanark and kills Sheriff William Hesselrig. He joins with William Douglas the Hardy, the first Scottish nobleman in rebellion – combining forces at Sanquhar, Durisdeer and Scone Abbey (known as the Raid on Scone) in June. Later, Wallace captures the English treasury at Scone to finance the rebellion against Edward I of England.
- Summer – Edward I of England orders a punitive expedition against the rebellious Scots. At Roxburgh, an army of some 9,000 men (including 2,000 cavalry) led by John de Warenne is assembled. Meanwhile, William Wallace leaves the forest of Selkirk with reinforcements and turns his attention north of the River Forth.
- July – In Scotland, a group of nobles forms a confederacy (organized by Robert Wishart, bishop of Glasgow), but are defeated by English troops at Irvine. An agreement of submission to Edward I of England is signed by the future Scottish king Robert the Bruce and other Scottish leaders.
- August 22 – Edward I of England leads an expedition to Flanders. He moves with an army (some 8,000 men) supported by 800 knights to Ghent and makes the city his base of operations in Flanders.
- September 11 – Battle of Stirling Bridge: Scottish forces (some 6,000 men) led by Andrew Moray and William Wallace defeat an English army under John de Warenne at Stirling on the Forth.
- October–November – Scottish forces led by William Wallace begin raids in Northumberland and Cumberland. During a ceremony at Selkirk, Wallace is knighted and appointed Guardian of Scotland. (Contradicts First Scottish War of Independence that cites William Wallace as having been made a knight and Guardian of Scotland in March, 1298)
- Winter – Edward I of England accepts a truce proposed by King Philip IV of France ("the Fair") and leaves Flanders. He returns to London and prepares a campaign against William Wallace in Scotland.

=== By topic ===
==== Religion ====
- May 3 – Stefano Colonna, Italian chief magistrate and papal official, captures the treasure of the tomb of Caecilia Metella near Rome, which is sent by the rival Caetani family to Pope Boniface VIII.
- July 11 – King Louis IX of France (died 1270) is canonized by Boniface VIII. Louis a devout Christian of the Catholic Church, banned during his reign prostitution, gambling, blasphemy and judicial duels.
- Boniface VIII attempts to end the rivalry between Genoa and Pisa over the Tyrrhenian islands of Sardinia and Corsica, naming King James II of Aragon ("the Just") as regent of the islands.
- A Portuguese Water Dog is first described in a monk's report of a drowning sailor, who has been pulled from the sea by a dog.

== Births ==
- March 25
  - Andronikos III Palaiologos, Byzantine emperor (d. 1341)
  - Arnošt of Pardubice, Czech archbishop and advisor (d. 1364)
- July 8 – Tarabya I of Sagaing, Burmese ruler (Myinsaing Kingdom) (d. 1339)
- August 14 – Hanazono, Japanese emperor and poet (d. 1348)
- Abu al-Hasan Ali ibn Othman, Marinid ruler of Morocco (d. 1351)
- Bernardo Canaccio, Italian nobleman, poet and writer (d. 1360)
- Charles II, Count of Alençon ("Magnanimous"), French nobleman and knight (d. 1346)
- Ernest I, Duke of Brunswick-Grubenhagen, German nobleman and prince (House of Welf) (d. 1361)
- Ingeborg Eriksdottir, Norwegian princess and co-regent (d. 1357)
- Isabella of Sabran, Spanish noblewoman and princess (d. 1315)
- Kęstutis, Grand Duke of Lithuania (House of Gediminids) (d. 1382)
- Mary de Monthermer (or MacDuff), English noblewoman (d. 1371)
- Thomas Wake, 2nd Baron Wake of Liddell, English nobleman, governor and knight (d. 1349)
- Yanagiwara Sukeakira, Japanese nobleman (kugyō) (d. 1353)

== Deaths ==
- January 23 – Florent of Hainaut, Latin prince of Achaea (b. 1255)
- February 22 – Margaret of Cortona, Italian nun and saint (b. 1247)
- April 7 – Siegfried II of Westerburg, German nobleman and archbishop (b. 1258)
- May 21 – Judith of Habsburg, Bohemian queen consort (b. 1271)
- June 11 – Jeguk (Jangmok), Korean princess and queen consort (b. 1259)
- June 27 – Bérard de Got, French cardinal, bishop and diplomat
- August 13 – Gertrude of Aldenberg, German noblewoman (b. 1227)
- August 14 – Frederick III, Burgrave of Nuremberg, German nobleman and knight (b. 1220)
- August 16 – John II, Byzantine emperor of Trebizond (b. 1262)
- August 18 – Simon de Beaulieu, French nobleman and bishop
- August 19 – Louis of Toulouse, Neapolitan archbishop (b. 1274)
- August 20 – William Fraser, Scottish monk, chancellor and bishop
- September 11 – Hugh de Cressingham, English advisor and knight
- November 21 – Roger de Mowbray, English nobleman (b. 1254)
- December 28 – Hugh Aycelin, French priest and cardinal (b. 1230)
- Andrew Moray (or de Moray), Scottish nobleman and rebel leader
- Hesso, Margrave of Baden-Baden, German nobleman, co-ruler and knight (b. 1268)
- Louis of Brienne, French nobleman and knight (County of Brienne)
- Muktabai (or Mukta), Indian religious leader and mystic (b. 1279)
- Nikephoros I Komnenos Doukas, Latin ruler (despot) of Epirus
- Radulphus de Canaberiis, French nobleman, teacher and canon
- Richard FitzJohn, English nobleman, judge, constable and knight
- Roger de Montalt, Norman nobleman and rebel leader (b. 1265)
