= 1250 =

1250 in various calendars
- Gregorian calendar: 1250; MCCL
- Ab urbe condita: 2003
- Armenian calendar: 699; ԹՎ ՈՂԹ
- Assyrian calendar: 6000
- Balinese saka calendar: 1171–1172
- Bengali calendar: 656–657
- Berber calendar: 2200
- English Regnal year: 34 Hen. 3 – 35 Hen. 3
- Buddhist calendar: 1794
- Burmese calendar: 612
- Byzantine calendar: 6758–6759
- Chinese calendar: 己酉年 (Earth Rooster); 3947 or 3740 — to — 庚戌年 (Metal Dog); 3948 or 3741
- Coptic calendar: 966–967
- Discordian calendar: 2416
- Ethiopian calendar: 1242–1243
- Hebrew calendar: 5010–5011
- Hindu calendars
- Vikram Samvat: 1306–1307
- Shaka Samvat: 1171–1172
- Kali Yuga: 4350–4351
- Holocene calendar: 11250
- Igbo calendar: 250–251
- Iranian calendar: 628–629
- Islamic calendar: 647–648
- Japanese calendar: Kenchō 2 (建長２年)
- Javanese calendar: 1159–1160
- Julian calendar: 1250; MCCL
- Korean calendar: 3583
- Minguo calendar: 662 before ROC 民前662年
- Nanakshahi calendar: −218
- Thai solar calendar: 1792–1793
- Tibetan calendar: ས་མོ་བྱ་ལོ་ (female Earth-Bird); 1376 or 995 or 223 — to — ལྕགས་ཕོ་ཁྱི་ལོ་ (male Iron-Dog); 1377 or 996 or 224

Year 1250 (MCCL) was a common year starting on Saturday of the Julian calendar.

== Events ==
=== By place ===
==== World ====
- The world population is estimated at between 400 and 416 million individuals.
- World climate transitions from the Medieval Warm Period to the Little Ice Age.

==== Europe ====
- February 2 – King Erik Eriksson of Sweden dies. The ten-year-old Valdemar, the eldest son of Birger Jarl, is elected King of Sweden, and becomes the first king from the House of Bjälbo.
- October 12 – A great storm shifts the mouth of the River Rother in England 12 miles (20 km) to the west; a battering series of strong storms significantly alters other coastal geography around Romney Marsh.
- December 13 – Emperor Frederick II dies, beginning the 23-year-long "Great Interregnum". Frederick is the last Holy Roman Emperor of the Hohenstaufen dynasty; after the interregnum, the empire passes to the Habsburgs.
- The Lombard League dissolves upon the death of its member states' nemesis, Frederick II, Holy Roman Emperor.
- Albertus Magnus isolates the element arsenic, as the 8th discovered metal. He also first uses the word "oriole" to describe a type of bird (most likely the golden oriole).
- The Rialto Bridge in Venice (in modern-day Italy) is converted from a pontoon bridge to a permanent, raised wooden structure.
- The Ponts Couverts fortified bridges of Strasbourg (in modern-day France) are completed.
- Vincent of Beauvais completes his proto-encyclopedic work Speculum Maius ("Greater mirror").
- The first of the Parlements of Ancien Régime France is established.
- Villard de Honnecourt draws the first known image of a sawmill.
- The first usage is made of the English word "cuckold", according to the Oxford English Dictionary.
- Medieval music: The Notre Dame school of polyphony ends.

==== Asia ====
- July 9 – The Qaymariyya tribe engineers a coup d'état to hand over Damascus to An-Nasir Yusuf. The garrison in the citadel surrenders later to him.
- A kurultai is called by Batu Khan in Siberia as part of maneuverings which will elect Möngke Khan as khan of the Mongol Empire in 1251.
- Starting in this year and ending in 1275, the Muslim Shougeng Pu, likely a Persian or an Arab, serves as the Commissioner of Merchant Shipping for the Song dynasty Chinese seaport at Quanzhou, due to his effort in defeating pirates.

==== Africa ====
- March 11 – Egyptian politician Bahaa el-Din bin Hanna appointed Vizier of Egypt as the last vizier in the Ayyubid Sultanate of Egypt.
- April 8 – Battle of Fariskur: Louis IX (the Saint) is captured by Baibars' Egyptian Mamluk army while he is in Egypt conducting the Seventh Crusade; he later has to ransom himself.
- April 30 – King Louis IX (the Saint) is released by his Egyptian captors after paying a ransom of one million dinars and turning over the city of Damietta.
- May 2 – Al-Muazzam Turanshah, Ayyubid Sultan of Egypt, is murdered, ending effective Ayyubid Dynasty rule in the country. He is briefly succeeded by his widow, Sultana Shajar al-Durr.
- July 21 – Aybak becomes ruler of Egypt, beginning the Bahri Dynasty of the Mamluk Sultanate of Egypt. After 5 days he stands down and the six-year-old Al-Ashraf Musa is nominally proclaimed sultan.
- July 22 – Egyptian politician Bahaa el-Din bin Hanna appointed Vizier of Egypt as the first vizier in the Mamluk Sultanate of Egypt.
- The Welayta state is founded in modern-day Ethiopia.
- In Tunis, a popular rebellion against newly arrived, wealthy and influential Andalusian refugees breaks out, and is violently put down.
- The Hafsid caliph al-Mustansir enforces laws of ghiyar, or differentiation for non-Muslims. As such, Jews have to wear a distinguishing badge (shikla) which Tunisian Jews will have to wear into the nineteenth century.

==== Oceania ====
- Samoa frees itself from Tongan rule, which begins the Malietoa dynasty in Samoa (approximate date).

=== By topic ===
==== Markets ====
- The Flemish town of Douai emits the first recorded redeemable annuities in medieval Europe, confirming a trend of consolidation of local public debt started in 1218, in Rheims.
- The Sienese bankers belonging to the firm known as the Gran Tavola, under the steering of the Bonsignori Brothers, become the main financiers of the Papacy.

== Births ==
- April 8 – John Tristan, son of Louis IX (d. 1270)
- December – al-Allama al-Hilli, Persian Shia theologian (d. 1325)
- December 25 – John IV Doukas Laskaris, emperor of Nicaea (d. 1305)
- Agnes of Baden, German noblewoman (d. 1295)
- Albertus de Chiavari, Italian Master General (d. 1300)
- Beatrice of Savoy, Swiss noblewoman (d. 1292)
- Dmitry of Pereslavl, Kievan Grand Prince (d. 1294)
- Esclaramunda of Foix, queen consort of Majorca (d. 1315)
- Jeanne de Montfort de Chambéon, Swiss noblewoman (d. 1300)
- Margaret of Burgundy, queen of Sicily (d. 1308)
- Matteo I Visconti, Italian imperial vicar (d. 1322)
- Nijō Tameyo, Japanese official and poet (d. 1338)
- Niklot I, German nobleman and knight (d. 1323)
- Robert II, French nobleman and knight (d. 1302)
- Sancho of Aragon, Spanish archbishop (d. 1275)

=== Approximate date ===
- Adolf II of Waldeck, prince-bishop of Liège (d. 1302)
- Albert II, Duke of Saxony, German nobleman (d. 1298)
- Albert III, Margrave of Brandenburg-Salzwedel, German nobleman and knight (d. 1300)
- 1250 or 1259 – Asher ben Jehiel, German Jewish rabbi (d. 1327)
- Diether of Nassau, archbishop of Trier (d. 1307)
- Fra Dolcino, Italian priest and reformist (d. 1307)
- Grigorije II of Ras, Serbian monk-scribe (d. 1321)
- 1250–1259 – Guido Cavalcanti, Italian poet and writer (d. 1300)
- Konrad II of Masovia, Polish nobleman (d. 1294)
- Mordechai ben Hillel, German scholar (d. 1298)
- Rhys ap Maredudd, Welsh nobleman (d. 1292)
- Theodoric of Freiberg, German physicist (d. 1311)
- Záviš of Falkenstein, Bohemian nobleman (d. 1290)

== Deaths ==
- February 2 – Erik Eriksson, king of Sweden (b. 1216)
- February 6 – Geoffrey VI, French nobleman and knight
- February 8
  - Andrew III, French nobleman and knight (b. 1200)
  - Fakhr ad-Din, Egyptian ruler and military leader
  - Robert I (the Good), French nobleman (b. 1216)
  - William Longespée (the Younger), English knight
- February 11 – Jean de Ronay, French Grand Master
- March 29 – Ludolph of Ratzeburg, German bishop
- April 6
  - Guillaume de Sonnac, French Grand Master
  - Hugh XI of Lusignan, French nobleman (b. 1221)
- May 2 – Al-Muazzam Turanshah, Ayyubid ruler of Egypt
- May 21 – Humbert V, French nobleman and knight (b. 1198)
- May 26 – Peter I (Mauclerc), French nobleman (b. 1187)
- May 27 – Raniero Capocci, Italian priest and cardinal
- June 7 – Vitslav I, Danish nobleman and knight (b. 1180)
- June 11 – Alice of Schaerbeek, Flemish Cistercian lay sister (b. c. 1220)
- June 18 – Theresa of Portugal, queen of León (b. 1176)
- August 10 – Eric IV (Ploughpenny), king of Denmark
- October 4 – Herman VI, German nobleman and knight
- October 12 – Richard Wendene, English bishop (b. 1219)
- December 13 – Frederick II, Holy Roman Emperor (b. 1194)
- Yang Miaozhen, Chinese female military leader (b. 1193)

=== Approximate date ===
- Gilbertus Anglicus, English physician and writer (b. 1180)
- Julian of Speyer, German Franciscan composer and poet
- Fibonacci (Leonardo Bonacci), Pisan mathematician and writer (b. c. 1170)
- Romée de Villeneuve, French nobleman and seneschal
- Shihab al-Din Muhammad al-Nasawi, Persian biographer
- Walter of Serviliano, Italian Benedictine hermit and abbot
- Panji Tohjaya, king of Singhasari.
