= Walter of Serviliano =

Italian Roman Catholic saint

Saint Walter
- Died: 1250
- Venerated in: Roman Catholic Church
- Feast: 4 June

Walter was a Benedictine hermit. He later became abbot, being the founder of the monastery of Serviliano in Marche, Italy. This monastery was famed for the rejuvenation pioneered by religious orders in that era.
