= Bernard of Trilia =

French Dominican philosopher (c.1240–1292)

Bernard of Trilia (Bernard de la Treille, Bernardus de Trilia) (Nîmes, c. 1240 – 1292) was a French Dominican theologian and scholastic philosopher. He was an early supporter of the teaching of Thomas Aquinas. He lectured at Montpellier.
