= Lourenço Soares de Valadares =

Portuguese politician (c. 1230–1298)

- Lord
- Born: 13th century Kingdom of Portugal
- Died: 13th century Kingdom of Portugal

Lourenço Soares de Valladares, Lord of Valadares and Tangil (c. 1230–1298) was a Portuguese nobleman, who served in the Court of Afonso III as Tenente of Ribeira do Minho and Mayor of the Palace.

He was the son of Soeiro Aires de Valadares (descendant of Aires Nunes) and Estevainha Ponce de Baião. His first wife was Maria Mendes de Sousa, a noble woman, descendant of Count Mendo de Sousa and Sueiro Belfaguer.
