= Zhou Boqi =

Chinese calligrapher, painter, and poet of the Yuan dynasty

Zhou Boqi Chinese: 周伯琦 (1298–1369) was a Chinese court poet during the Yuan Dynasty. Zhou was born in Raozhou (now Boyang) but grew up in Beijing, and in his early career worked there as a magistrate and later as Senior Compiler for Imperial Academy. He was well known for his seal script calligraphy.

== Liushu zheng'e ==
Zhou Boqi is the author of the Liushu zheng'e (六书正讹/六書正訛 Liùshū zhèng'é), a book with the aim of correcting errors in the six categories of Chinese characters (六书/六書 liùshū), which is used by the Hanyu da zidian (HYDZD) f.e. in the Siku quanshu-edition.
