= As-Suwaydi (physician) =

As-Suwaydi (1204–1292, AH 604–690, full name ‘Izz al-Dīn Abū Isḥāq Ibrāhīm ibn Muḥammad ibn Ṭarkhān as-Suwaydī ابراهيم ابن محمد ابن طرخان السويدى) was a medieval Arab physician from the Aws tribe, and a pupil of Ibn al-Baytar. Active in Cairo and Damascus, he compiled three works: a treatise on plant names, a treatise on the medical use of stones, and a book of medical recipes and procedures (Tadhkirah). As-Suwaydi's Tadhkirah was epitomized by Shaʿrānī in the 16th century.
