= 1271 =

1271 in various calendars
- Gregorian calendar: 1271; MCCLXXI
- Ab urbe condita: 2024
- Armenian calendar: 720; ԹՎ ՉԻ
- Assyrian calendar: 6021
- Balinese saka calendar: 1192–1193
- Bengali calendar: 677–678
- Berber calendar: 2221
- English Regnal year: 55 Hen. 3 – 56 Hen. 3
- Buddhist calendar: 1815
- Burmese calendar: 633
- Byzantine calendar: 6779–6780
- Chinese calendar: 庚午年 (Metal Horse); 3968 or 3761 — to — 辛未年 (Metal Goat); 3969 or 3762
- Coptic calendar: 987–988
- Discordian calendar: 2437
- Ethiopian calendar: 1263–1264
- Hebrew calendar: 5031–5032
- Hindu calendars
- Vikram Samvat: 1327–1328
- Shaka Samvat: 1192–1193
- Kali Yuga: 4371–4372
- Holocene calendar: 11271
- Igbo calendar: 271–272
- Iranian calendar: 649–650
- Islamic calendar: 669–670
- Japanese calendar: Bun'ei 8 (文永８年)
- Javanese calendar: 1181–1182
- Julian calendar: 1271; MCCLXXI
- Korean calendar: 3604
- Minguo calendar: 641 before ROC 民前641年
- Nanakshahi calendar: −197
- Thai solar calendar: 1813–1814
- Tibetan calendar: ལྕགས་ཕོ་རྟ་ལོ་ (male Iron-Horse); 1397 or 1016 or 244 — to — ལྕགས་མོ་ལུག་ལོ་ (female Iron-Sheep); 1398 or 1017 or 245

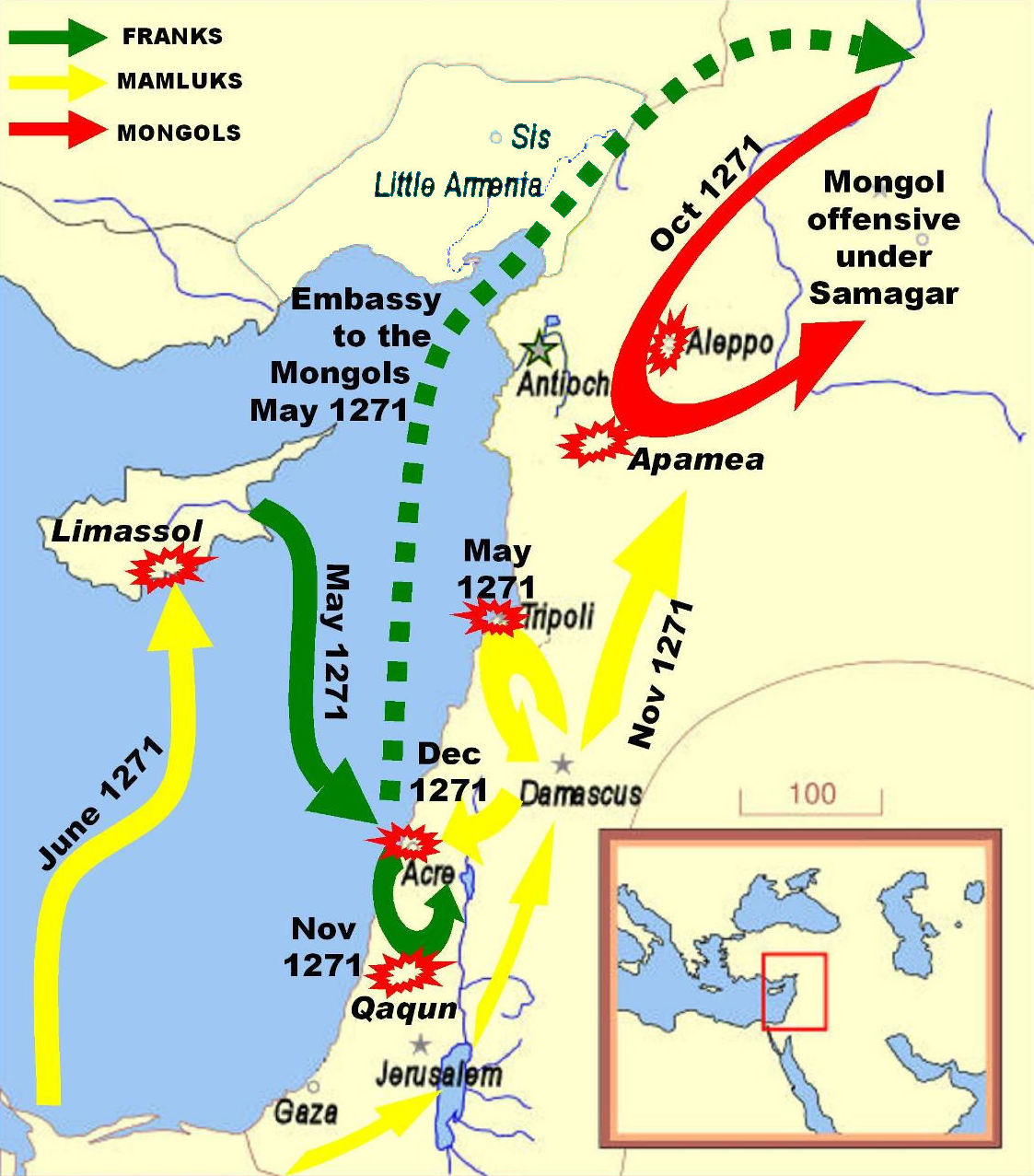
Map showing Lord Edward's crusade

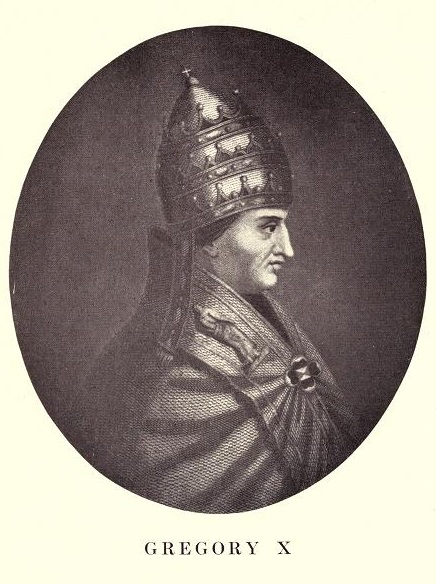
Pope Gregory X (in office 1271–1276)

Year 1271 (MCCLXXI) was a common year starting on Thursday of the Julian calendar.

== Events ==
=== By place ===
==== Europe ====
- July 2 – Peace of Pressburg: Kings Ottokar II and Stephen V sign a peace agreement at Pressburg, settling territorial claims, following the failed invasion of Hungary by Ottokar in April. In the agreement, Stephen promises not to support Ottokar's opponents in Carinthia, and Ottokar renounces the castles he and his partisans occupy in Hungary.
- August 21 – The counties of Poitou and Toulouse are absorbed into the French domains following the death of Alphonse, Count of Poitiers, son of the late King Louis VIII of France.
- Construction of the Tower of Kamyenyets (or the White Tower) in Belarus begins. Later, it becomes a frontier stronghold on the northern border of Volhynia.
- The 17-year-old Marco Polo departs from Venice with his father and uncle Niccolò and Maffeo Polo, to set off for Asia to meet the Mongolian emperor Kublai Khan (the grandson of Genghis Khan) at his court in Beijing, China. They sail across the Mediterranean Sea and travel overland, crossing Armenia, Persia and the Pamir Mountains.

==== Levant ====
- February – Mamluk forces led by Sultan Baibars continue their territorial expansion in western Syria and appear before Safita Castle (called the White Castle) built by the Knights Templar. After a heroic defense, the small garrison is advised by Grand Master Thomas Bérard to surrender. The survivors are allowed to withdraw to Tortosa.
- April 8 – Siege of Krak des Chevaliers: Mamluk forces under Baibars capture the strategically important castle Krak des Chevaliers from the Knights Hospitaller. During the siege the defenders receive a letter, supposedly from Grand Master Hugues de Revel, to surrender the castle. Under safe-conduct the Hospitallers retreat to Tripoli.
- May–June – Baibars conducts an unsuccessful siege of Tripoli, and also fails in an attempted naval invasion of Cyprus. He sends an Egyptian fleet (some 20 ships) to Limassol, while King Hugh III of Cyprus ("the Great") has left for Acre. Due to bad weather and seamanship, 11 ships run aground and the crews fall into the hands of the Cypriots.
- May 9 – English prince the Lord Edward and King Charles I of Anjou arrive in Acre, with a fleet of 30 galleys, starting Lord Edward's crusade (the Ninth) against Baibars. During this crusade they are unable to capture any territory and peace is quickly negotiated with the Mamluk Sultanate. Baibars consolidates his occupation in Syria.
- October – Abaqa Khan, Mongol ruler of the Ilkhanate, detaches some 10,000 horsemen from Anatolia to support the Lord Edward in his war against Baibars. They invade Syria and defeat Mamluk forces who protect the region around Aleppo. The Mongols plunder the cities of Maarat al-Numan and Apamea.

==== Asia ====
- September 12 – Nichiren, Japanese Buddhist priest, is arrested by a band of soldiers and nearly beheaded. This incident, known as Hosshaku Kenpon or "casting off the transient and revealing the true," is regarded as a turning point of Nichiren's teachings within the various schools, known as Nichiren Buddhism.
- December 18 – Kublai Khan renames his empire "Great Yuan" (大元; dà yuán), officially marking the start of the Yuan dynasty in China.
- The Nakhi Kingdom, of the northern Himalayan foothills, is annexed by the Yuan dynasty (approximate date).

=== By topic ===
==== Religion ====
- September 1 – Pope Gregory X succeeds the late Clement IV as the 184th pope of the Catholic Church, as the compromise candidate between French and Italian cardinals, ending a three-year conclave, the longest ever.

== Births ==
- March 13 – Judith of Habsburg, queen consort of Bohemia (d. 1297)
- March 14 – Stephen I, German nobleman and regent (d. 1310)
- May 25 – Shah Jalal, Indian Sufi leader and mystic (d. 1346)
- June 20 – John de Ferrers, English nobleman (d. 1312)
- September 8 – Charles Martel, king of Hungary (d. 1295)
- September 27 – Wenceslaus II, king of Poland (d. 1305)
- November 2 – Gong of Song, Chinese emperor (d. 1323)
- November 5 – Mahmud Ghazan, Mongol ruler (d. 1304)
- Blanche of Brittany, French noblewoman (d. 1327)
- Cheng Duanli, Chinese scholar and poet (d. 1345)
- Cormac MacCarthy Mor, Irish king of Desmond (d. 1359)
- Elizabeth of Aragon, queen consort of Portugal (d. 1336)
- Gerlach I, Count of Nassau, German nobleman and knight (d. 1361)
- Mikhail of Tver (Mikhail Yaroslavich), Kievan Grand Prince (d. 1318)
- Nijō Tamemichi, Japanese poet and writer (d. 1299)
- Saionji Shōshi (Eifuku Mon'in), Japanese empress consort (d. 1342)
- Sargis II Jaqeli, Georgian nobleman and prince (d. 1334)
- Sunbi Heo, wife of Chungseon of Goryeo (d. 1335)

== Deaths ==
- January 17 – Joan, Countess of Chiny, French noblewoman (b. 1205)
- January 28 – Isabella of Aragon, queen consort of France (b. 1248)
- February 9 – Beatrix of Andechs-Merania, German princess (b. 1210)
- March 13 – Henry of Almain (Henry of Cornwall), English nobleman (b. 1235)
- March 21 – Ibn Sab'in, Andalusian philosopher and mystic
- c. April 10 – Stephen the Posthumous, Hungarian pretender (b. 1236)
- April 17 – Isabella of France, queen consort of Navarre (b. 1241)
- July 1 – Bartholomew of Braganca, Italian friar and bishop
- July 28 – Walter de Burgh, 1st Earl of Ulster (or Bourke), Norman nobleman
- July – Arnaldo de Peralta, Aragonese archbishop and statesman
- August 21 – Alphonse, Count of Poitiers, son of Louis VIII of France (b. 1220)
- August 25 – Joan of Toulouse, French noblewoman (b. 1220)
- September 1 – Annibaldo degli Annibaldi, Italian theologian
- September 9 – Yaroslav III, Kievan Grand Prince (b. 1230)
- October or November – Marsilio Zorzi, Venetian statesman, Count of Curzola and Mèleda
- October 17 – Steinvör Sighvatsdóttir, Icelandic female poet
- October 19 – Philip Basset, English chief justiciar (b. 1185)
- November 6 or 7 – Henry of Segusio, Italian jurist and cardinal-bishop (b. 1200)
- Al-Mansur al-Hasan, Yemeni imam and politician (b. 1199)
- Constantine Palaiologos, Byzantine nobleman, half-brother of Emperor Michael VIII, co-ruler and monk (b. c.1230)
- Ghiyas-ud-din Baraq, Mongol ruler of the Chagatai Khanate
- Haji Bektash Veli, Persian philosopher and mystic (b. 1209)
- Lauretta of Saarbrücken, German noblewoman and regent
- Maria of Chernigov, Kievan princess, regent and chronicler (b. 1212)
- Richard de Grey, English nobleman, constable and knight
- Roger de Leybourne, English nobleman and High Sheriff
- Vardan Areveltsi, Armenian historian and writer (b. 1198)
