= Conrad II of Teck =

Duke of Teck

Conrad II of Teck (1235 – 2 May 1292) was Duke of Teck.

Conrad was a descendant of the Zähringen family and a close follower of the Hohenstaufen dynasty. He served the Hohenstaufen claimant Conradin until the latter was executed in 1268.

A decade later he appears in the service of King Rudolf of Habsburg, negotiating with Pope Gregory X about the Imperial coronation.

After Rudolf's death in 1291, Conrad initially supported the king's son Albert in his bid for the kingship, but the princes of the realm opposed this succession.

German historian Armin Wolf argues that several sixteenth century sources and tombstones of the Teck family refer to Conrad as electus in regem and concludes that Conrad was elected King by Albert's partisans on 30 April 1292 in Weinheim. However, according to Wolf, this election was kept secret in order not to prejudice negotiations with the opposing party. Conrad travelled to Frankfurt, where the electors had assembled, but was killed there on the eve of 2 May 1292, probably by agents of the Archbishop of Cologne. Conrad's skull indeed indicates that he was murdered.

However, other historians doubt the validity and conclusiveness of the cited sources and point out that Conrad's kingship is absent from the sources before the sixteenth century.

Conrad was buried in Saint Martin's Church in the town of Owen, near the Teck castle. His grave is decorated with a coat of arms showing a crowned eagle. Historians who accept the historicity of Conrad's kingship point to this as evidence, whereas those of the opposing view point to the uncertain date of the decoration's construction.

== Literature ==
- Alpers, Karl-Otto (1992). "Ein Königsmord vor 700 Jahren? Konrad II. von Teck, Indizien sprechen für Mord". Beiträge zur Heimatkunde des Bezirks Kirchheim unter Teck (in German) (55): 17–22.
- Benz, Eberhard (1984). "Herzog Konrad von Teck". Eberhard Benz und der Altkreis Nürtingen. Gesammelte Schriften (in German). Nürtingen. pp. 231–238.
- Gerlich, Alois (1994). "Rezension zu Armin Wolf: König für einen Tag. Konrad von Teck: gewählt, ermordet (?), vergessen". Nassauische Annalen (in German). 105. Kirchheim unter Teck: 420–421.
- Götz, Rolf (1994). "Herzog Konrad von Teck und die Königswahl von 1292. Bemerkungen zu Armin Wolfs Arbeit 'König für einen Tag: gewählt, ermordet (?) und vergessen'". Zeitschrift für Württembergische Landesgeschichte (in German). 53: 27–40.
- Götz, Rolf (1971). "Herzog Konrad und die Königswahl von 1292". Beiträge zur Heimatkunde des Bezirks Kirchheim unter Teck (in German). 13: 51–58.
- Hoffmann, Frank (1989). "Konrad von Teck, 'Ein König für einen Tag'". Beiträge zur Heimatkunde des Bezirks Kirchheim unter Teck (in German). 49: 21–24.
- Klemm, Alfred (1894). "Der Grabstein der Herzöge von Teck". Blätter des Schwäbischen Albvereins (in German): 11–12.
- Locher, Rudolf (1975). "Die Grablege der Herzöge von Teck". Beiträge zur Heimatkunde des Bezirks Kirchheim unter Teck (in German). 21: 57.
- Pfaff, Karl (1846). "Geschichte der Herzöge von Teck". Württembergisches Jahrbuch für Vaterländische Geschichte (in German): 93–154.
- Wendt, Nadja (1995). "König für einen Tag". Damals (in German). Vol. 27, no. 2. pp. 45–46.
- Wolf, Armin (1993). König für einen Tag: Konrad von Teck: gewählt, ermordet (?) und vergessen. Schriftenreihe des Stadtarchivs Kirchheim unter Teck (in German). Vol. 17. Kirchheim unter Teck.
- Wolf, Armin (1998). Die Entstehung des Kurfürstenkollegs 1198–1298. Zur 700-jährigen Wiederkehr der ersten Vereinigung der sieben Kurfürsten. Historisches Seminar NF (in German). Vol. 11. Idstein. pp. 59–66.
- Wunder, Gerd (1968). "Herzog Konrad II. von Teck". Zeitschrift für Württembergische Landesgeschichte (in German). 27: 113–116.
