= Benvenuta Bojani =

Blessed Benvenuta Bojani TOSD
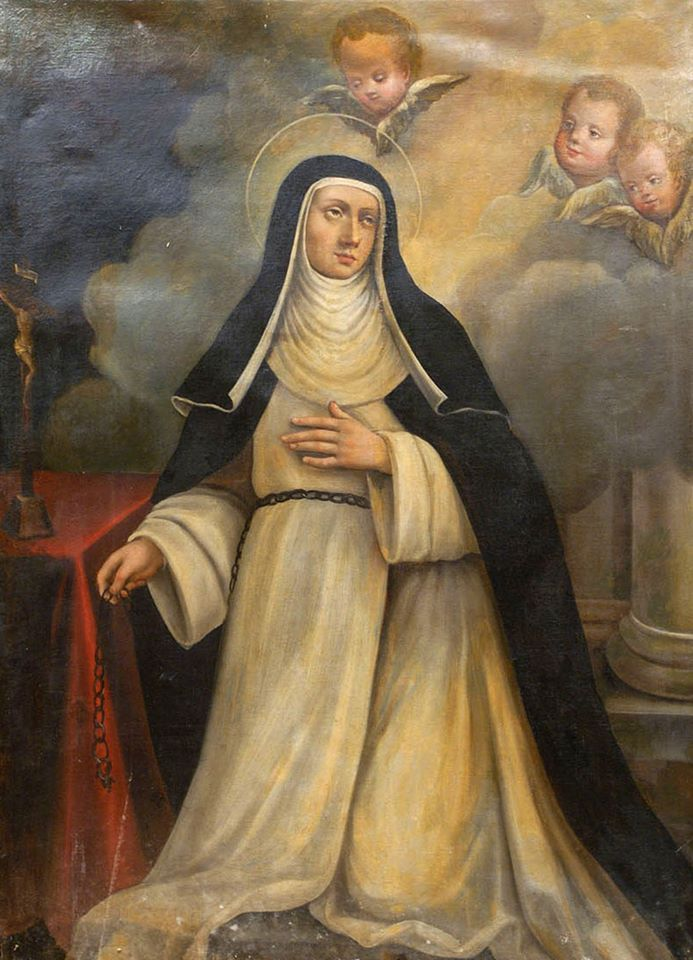

Virgin
- Born: 4 May 1254; Cividale del Friuli, Republic of Venice
- Died: 30 October 1292 (aged 38); Cividale del Friuli, Republic of Venice
- Venerated in: Roman Catholic Church
- Beatified: 6 February 1763, Saint Peter's Basilica, Papal States by Pope Clement XIV
- Feast: 30 October
- Attributes: Dominican habit, rope

Benvenuta Bojani (4 May 1254 - 30 October 1292) was an Italian religious sister of the Third Order of Saint Dominic. Bojani dedicated her life to strict austerities as an act of repentance and devotion to God and was said to have had visions of angels and demons.

The confirmation of the late Bojani's popular devotion allowed for Pope Clement XIV to approve her beatification in 1763.

== Life ==
Benvenuta Bojani was born in the Republic of Venice in 1254 as the last of seven daughters. The midwife declared she was a girl to her father's disappointment - who wanted a son - but instead said with part cheer: "She too shall be welcome!" Bojani was baptized in her name for it meant 'welcome' due to her father's words at her birth.

Bojani refused to participate in childhood games that dabbled in worldliness or vainness for she remained a pious child devoted to the service of God rather than to the secular world. But one vain older sister tried and failed to teach her to dress in rich clothing and indulge in pleasures that her sister refused to do. In 1266 she began to wear a hair net and a rope girdle as signs of austerities she began to undertake but as she grew the girdle began to cut into her and had to be removed. The girdle could not be removed because it was far too embedded for it to be untied but after turning to God the rope fell to her feet.

In her adolescence she became a member of the Third Order of Saint Dominic and lived her entire life at home to continue practicing her austerities. Bojani became ill due to long periods of fasting and lack of sleep and was confined to her bed for five years and had to be carried to Mass; one kind older sister carried her to church at least once a week for the celebration of compline. During the celebration of Mass on the eve of the feast of Saint Dominic near the tomb of the saint in the Basilica of San Domenico in Bologna the saint himself - alongside Saint Peter - appeared to her and she was healed during the Mass. Bojani saw the saint's face take the place of the prior's face when compline commenced; the saint then went to his tomb and disappeared while the Madonna came down the aisle with the Infant Jesus and blessed all priests present. This moment of apparitions was when she was healed of her ailment.

== Beatification ==
Bojani died on 30 October 1292 and was interred in the church of Saint Dominic in her hometown. Her beatification received approval from Pope Clement XIV - on 6 February 1763.
