= 1230 =

1230 in various calendars
- Gregorian calendar: 1230; MCCXXX
- Ab urbe condita: 1983
- Armenian calendar: 679; ԹՎ ՈՀԹ
- Assyrian calendar: 5980
- Balinese saka calendar: 1151–1152
- Bengali calendar: 636–637
- Berber calendar: 2180
- English Regnal year: 14 Hen. 3 – 15 Hen. 3
- Buddhist calendar: 1774
- Burmese calendar: 592
- Byzantine calendar: 6738–6739
- Chinese calendar: 己丑年 (Earth Ox); 3927 or 3720 — to — 庚寅年 (Metal Tiger); 3928 or 3721
- Coptic calendar: 946–947
- Discordian calendar: 2396
- Ethiopian calendar: 1222–1223
- Hebrew calendar: 4990–4991
- Hindu calendars
- Vikram Samvat: 1286–1287
- Shaka Samvat: 1151–1152
- Kali Yuga: 4330–4331
- Holocene calendar: 11230
- Igbo calendar: 230–231
- Iranian calendar: 608–609
- Islamic calendar: 627–628
- Japanese calendar: Kangi 2 (寛喜２年)
- Javanese calendar: 1139–1140
- Julian calendar: 1230; MCCXXX
- Korean calendar: 3563
- Minguo calendar: 682 before ROC 民前682年
- Nanakshahi calendar: −238
- Thai solar calendar: 1772–1773
- Tibetan calendar: ས་མོ་གླང་ལོ་ (female Earth-Ox); 1356 or 975 or 203 — to — ལྕགས་ཕོ་སྟག་ལོ་ (male Iron-Tiger); 1357 or 976 or 204

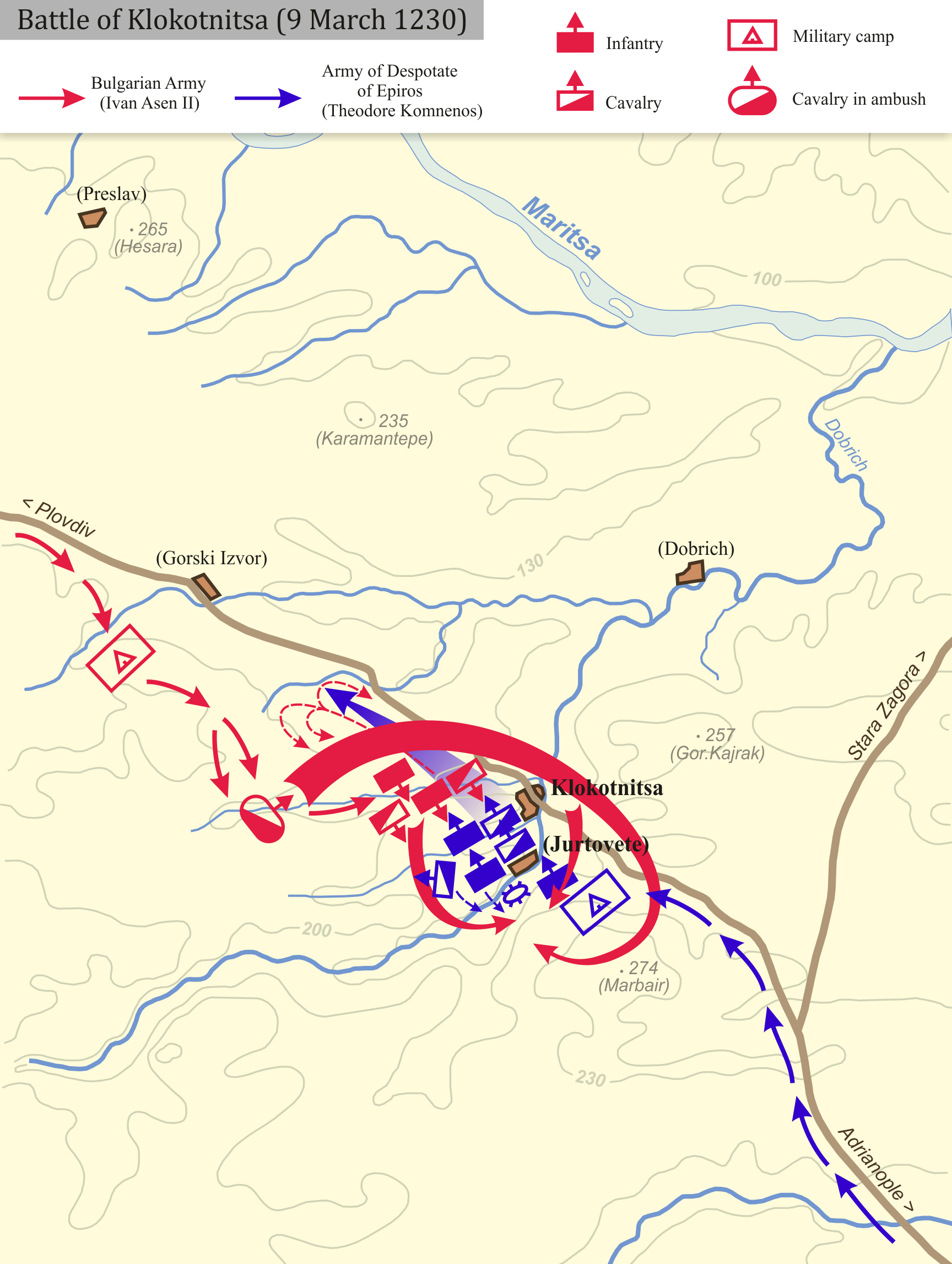
Map of the Battle of Klokotnitsa (1230)

Year 1230 (MCCXXX) was a common year starting on Tuesday of the Julian calendar.

== Events ==
=== By place ===
==== Byzantine Empire ====
- March 9 – Battle of Klokotnitsa: Byzantine forces under Theodore Komnenos Doukas invade Bulgaria, breaking the peace treaty with Tsar Ivan Asen II. Theodore gathers a large army, including western mercenaries. The two armies meet near the village of Klokotnitsa. Ivan applies clever tactics and manages to surround the Byzantines. They are completely defeated; only a small force under Theodore's brother Manuel Doukas manages to escape the battlefield. Theodore is taken prisoner and is blinded. In the aftermath, Ivan quickly extends its control over most of Theodore's domains in Thrace, Macedonia and Albania. The Latin Duchy of Philippopolis and the independent principality of Alexius Slav are also captured and annexed into Bulgaria.

==== Europe ====
- Reconquista – King Alfonso IX of León defeats Ibn Hud al-Yamani (known as Almogàver by the Christians). This success opens the road to Badajoz to the Leonese troops. The Portuguese king Sancho II continues his offensive southward and takes Beja, Juromenha, Serpa and Moura.
- August – Treaty of Ceprano: Emperor Frederick II returns from the Sixth Crusade and signs a peace agreement with Pope Gregory IX at Ceprano. He agrees not to violate any territories held by the Papal States in return for Frederick's concessions in Sicily.
- Frederick II bestows on the Teutonic Order a special privilege for the conquest of Prussia, including Chełmno Land, with papal sovereignty. He allows the Teutonic Knights to forcibly convert the Prussians to Christianity.
- September 24 – Alfonso IX dies after a 42-year reign and is succeeded by his son Ferdinand III, who receives the Kingdom of León in return for compensation in cash and lands for his half-sisters Sancha and Dulce.
- Siege of Galway in Ireland: Norman forces under Richard Mór de Burgh invade Connacht and desolate a large portion of the country. He besieges Galway, but is forced to retreat after a week-long inconclusive battle.

==== England ====
- April 30 – English invasion of France: King Henry III embarks from Portsmouth with a large expeditionary force. On May 2, he arrives on the island of Guernsey, and the next day the English army lands at Saint-Malo, where Peter I (de Dreux), duke of Brittany, meets Henry to pay him homage. The English forces march through the County of Anjou, taking the castle of Mirebeau in late July.
- October 27 – Henry III signs a truce with King Louis IX of France ("the Saint") and returns to Portsmouth. He leaves a small force under Peter I and Ranulf de Blondeville, to act against the French in Brittany and Normandy.

==== Middle East ====
- Battle of Yassıçemen: A Seljuk-Ayyubid coalition (some 40,000 men) defeats the Khwarazmians under Sultan Jalal al-Din Mangburni at Erzincan on the Upper Euphrates.

=== By topic ===
==== Literature ====
- The Carmina Burana poetry and song collection is created (approximate date).

==== Religion ====
- Pluscarden Priory is founded in Scotland; it will be revived to become an abbey in 1974.

== Births ==
- March – Henry of Castile the Senator, Spanish prince (d. 1303)
- Anna of Hohenstaufen, empress of Nicaea (d. 1307)
- Elisabeth of Brunswick-Lüneburg, German queen consort (d. 1266)
- Gottfried Hagen, German cleric and writer (d. 1299)
- Hermann of Buxhoeveden, Bishop of Ösel-Wiek, German churchman (d. 1285)
- Hugh Aycelin, French cardinal and theologian (d. 1297)
- Hu Sanxing (or Shenzhi), Chinese historian (d. 1302)
- Leonardo Patrasso, Italian cardinal-bishop (d. 1311)
- Masuccio Primo, Italian architect and sculptor (d. 1306)
- Maud de Lacy, Baroness Geneville, Norman-Irish noblewoman (d. 1304)
- Odo, Count of Nevers (or Eudes), French nobleman and knight (d. 1266)
- Squarcino Borri, Italian mercenary leader (d. 1277)
- Yaroslav III of Tver, Kievan Grand Prince (d. 1271)

Approximate date

- Adelaide of Holland, Dutch countess and regent (d. 1284)
- Bentivenga dei Bentivenghi, Italian cardinal (d. 1289)
- Boniface VIII, pope of the Catholic Church (d. 1303)
- Edmund de Lacy, English nobleman and knight (d. 1258)
- Guillaume de Beaujeu, French Grand Master (d. 1291)
- Guillaume Durand, French bishop and writer (d. 1296)
- Jacobus de Voragine, Italian archbishop (d. 1298)
- Margaret Sambiria, Danish queen consort (d. 1282)
- Peter Quinel, English archdeacon and bishop (d. 1291)

== Deaths ==
- January 30 – Pelagio Galvani, Leonese cardinal (b. 1165)
- February 1 – Matsudono Motofusa, Japanese nobleman
- May 2 – William de Braose, English nobleman and knight
- May 13 – Casimir I of Opole, Polish nobleman and knight
- July 12 – Margaret, Countess of Blois, French noblewoman (b. 1170)
- July 19 –Theobald le Botiller, 2nd Chief Butler of Ireland, Norman nobleman (b. 1200)
- July 25 – Rudolph van Coevorden, Dutch nobleman (b. 1192)
- July 28 – Leopold VI, Duke of Austria, German nobleman and knight (b. 1176)
- July 29 – Hōjō Tokiuji, Japanese nobleman and spy (b. 1203)
- August 24 – Geoffrey de Saye, English nobleman (b. 1155)
- September 9 – Siegfried II, archbishop of Mainz (b. 1165)
- September 24 – Alfonso IX, king of León and Galicia (b. 1171)
- October 25 – Gilbert de Clare, 5th Earl of Gloucester, English nobleman (b. 1180)
- November 20 – Nicola de la Haye, English noblewoman
- November 24 – Matthew II of Montmorency, French nobleman and knight
- December 15 – Ottokar I of Bohemia, German nobleman
- December 23 – Berengaria of Navarre, queen consort of England
- Al-Dakhwar, Ayyubid physician and medical officer (b. 1170)
- Alfonso Téllez de Meneses el Viejo, Spanish nobleman (b. c.1161)
- Beatrice of Viennois, French noblewoman (b. 1160)
- Demetrius of Montferrat, king of Thessalonica (b. 1205)
- Hugues IV de Châteauneuf, French nobleman (b. 1185)
- Ibn Hammad, Hammadid historian and writer (b. 1153)
- Robert de Gresle, English landowner and knight (b. 1174)

Approximate date

- Samuel ibn Tibbon, French rabbi, doctor and philosopher
- Urraca López de Haro, queen consort of León
