= Bernardo Canaccio =

Italian poet

Bernardo Canaccio (1297 in Bologna – sometime after 1357) was an Italian poet.

== Life ==
He was the son of Arpinello, known as Canaccio, who belonged to the Ghibelline Scannabecchi family. At the age of two, his family was exiled and moved to Verona, where Bernardo and his brother Guglielmo encountered the Scaligeri and possibly Dante - the latter was in Verona from 1313 to 1319. From 1319 to 1320 Bernardo studied under Dante, who was then a guest of the Polenta family in Ravenna. On 26 August 1356 he was in Ravenna assisting with the writing of the will of his wife Sara da Camposampiero. An anonymous sonnet attributes the poem on Dante's sarcophagus to Canaccio which is also mentioned in Boccaccio's Life of Dante.
