= Elisabeth of Wetzikon =

Elisabeth of Wetzikon (1235 – 1298 in Zürich) was imperial abbess of the Fraumünster abbey in Zürich from 1270 until 1298, when the abbey was at the height of its power, having extensive properties reaching well into Central Switzerland (governing for example the canton of Uri) and political authority over the city of Zurich: Elisabeth appointed the mayor of Zurich and his deputy, she was the supreme judge of the city, and she collected the trade taxes (tariffs).

There are 170 surviving documents containing her name, some of them with her seal. In a document dated 25 January 1274, Rudolph of Habsburg granted her the right to mint coins.

Elisabeth was a daughter of the Freiherr Ulrich von Wetzikon. She is first mentioned in 1265 as a nun of the Fraumünster abbey.

== Mentions in famous works of literature ==
Elisabeth of Wetzikon is mentioned in several famous works of literature:

- Johannes Hadlaub in the «Codex Manesse»: … von Zürich diu vürstin … (of Zurich the ruling lady)
- Friedrich Schiller in the play «Wilhelm Tell»: Der großen Frau von Zürich bin ich vereidet … (I am under oath to the great lady of Zurich)
- Gottfried Keller in the novella «Hadlaub»: gleich neben ihr eine andere Konventualin der Abtei, Frau Elisabeth von Wetzikon, Muhme des Bischofs, die später die bedeutendste Äbtissin wurde, diese auch in weltlicher Tracht. (right next to her another Member of the Assembly of the abbey, Lady Elisabeth of Wetzikon, the aunt of the bishop, who later became the most significant abbess, also in secular garb.)

In 2009 Elisabeth was honoured by the Gesellschaft zu Fraumünster.
