= Evrard d'Orleans =

French gothic sculptor, painter, and architect

- Born: 1292
- Died: 1357 (aged 64–65)

Evrard d'Orleans (1292–1357) was a French gothic sculptor, painter, and architect.

D'Orleans worked for the French Royal Court, producing a number of paintings and sculptures. He also worked on the Langres Cathedral, to repair and add pieces to it after a fire. One of his works for the Cathedral, An Angel Carrying Two Cruets, currently resides at the Louvre.
