= Macduff of Fife =

Macduff of Fife (died 22 July 1298) played a small but significant role in the Wars of Scottish Independence.

He administered the earldom of Fife during the earl's minority.

He was involved in a legal dispute during the reign of John Balliol which had wider constitutional implications.

He took part in the Scottish rising of early 1297, but was captured by the Earl of Strathearn, who refused to hand him over to the English.

He was killed leading the common soldiers from the earldom of Fife at the Battle of Falkirk.
