= 13th century =

One hundred years, from 1201 to 1300

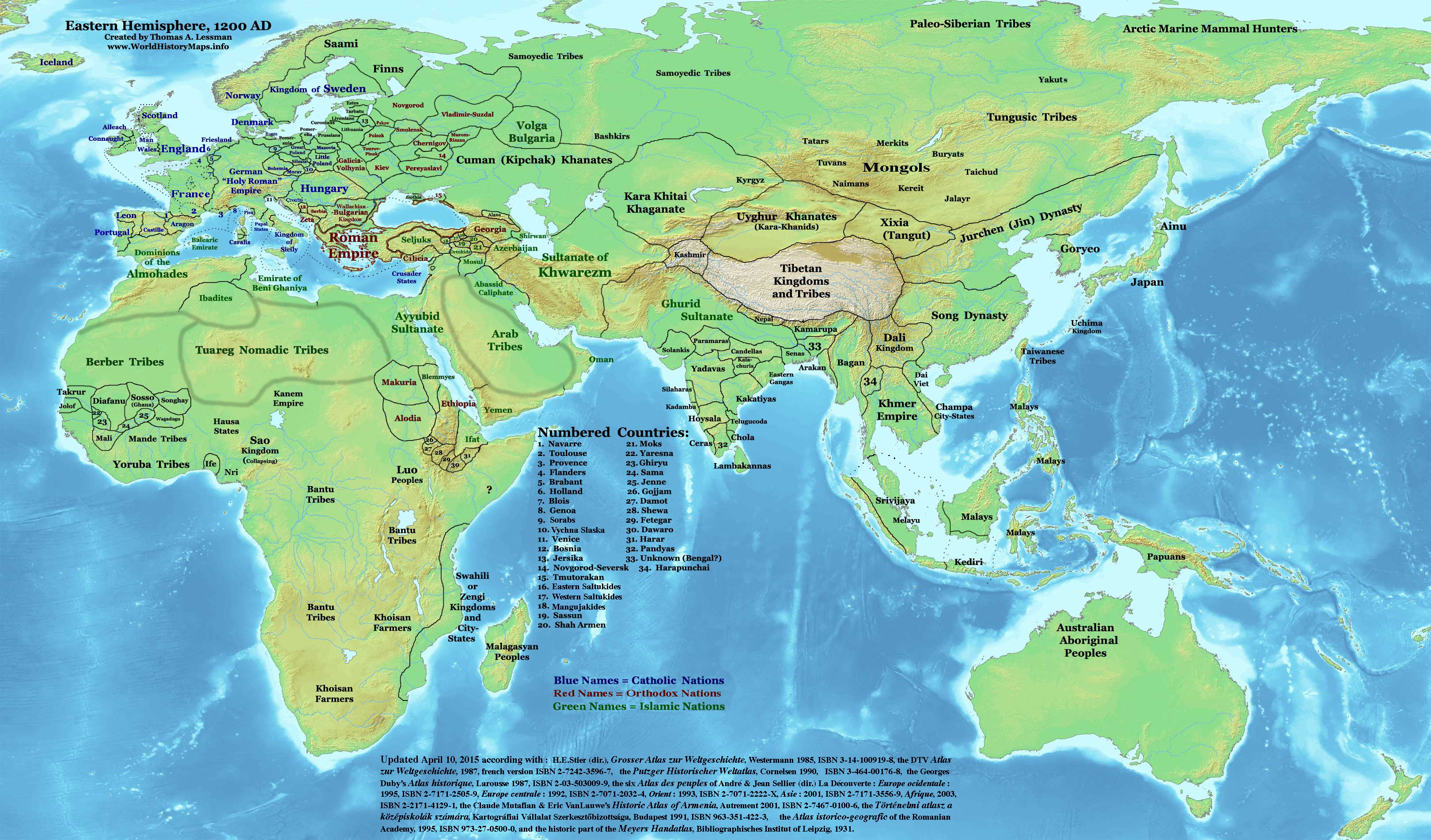
Eastern Hemisphere in 1200 AD

Portrait of Mongol Emperor Genghis Khan, whose conquests created the largest contiguous empire in history

The 13th century was the century which lasted from January 1, 1201 (represented by the Roman numerals MCCI) through December 31, 1300 (MCCC) in accordance with the Julian calendar.

The Mongol Empire was founded by Genghis Khan, which stretched from Eastern Asia to Eastern Europe. The conquests of Hulagu Khan and other Mongol invasions changed the course of the Muslim world, most notably the Siege of Baghdad (1258) and the destruction of the House of Wisdom. Other Muslim powers such as the Mali Empire and Delhi Sultanate conquered large parts of West Africa and the Indian subcontinent, while Buddhism witnessed a decline through the conquest led by Bakhtiyar Khilji. The earliest Islamic states in Southeast Asia formed during this century, most notably Samudera Pasai. The Kingdoms of Sukhothai and Hanthawaddy would emerge and go on to dominate their surrounding territories.

Europe entered the apex of the High Middle Ages, characterized by rapid legal, cultural, and religious evolution as well as economic dynamism. Crusades after the fourth, while mostly unsuccessful in rechristianizing the Holy Land, inspired the desire to expel Muslim presence from Europe that drove the Reconquista and solidified a sense of Christendom. To the north, the Teutonic Order Christianized and gained dominance of Prussia, Estonia, and Livonia. Inspired by new translations into Latin of classical works preserved in the Islamic World for over a thousand years, Thomas Aquinas developed Scholasticism, which dominated the curricula of the new universities. In England, King John signed the Magna Carta, beginning the tradition of Parliamentary advisement in England. This helped develop the principle of equality under law in European jurisprudence. However, economic disparity between feudal classes became noticeable.

The Southern Song dynasty began the century as a prosperous kingdom but were later invaded and annexed into the Yuan dynasty of the Mongols. The Kamakura Shogunate of Japan successfully resisted two Mongol invasion attempts in 1274 and 1281. The Korean state of Goryeo resisted a Mongol invasion, but eventually sued for peace and became a client state of the Yuan dynasty.

In North America, according to some population estimates, the population of Cahokia grew to be comparable to the population of 13th-century London. In Peru, the Kingdom of Cuzco began as part of the Late Intermediate Period. In Mayan civilization, the 13th century marked the beginning of the Late Postclassic period. The Kanem Empire in what is now Chad reached its apex. The Solomonic dynasty in Ethiopia and the Zimbabwe Kingdom were founded.

== Events ==
=== 1201–1209 ===
- 1202: Introduction of Liber Abaci by Fibonacci.
- 1202: Battle of Basian occurs on July 27, between Kingdom of Georgia and Seljuks.
- 1202: Battle of Mirebeau occurs on August 1, between Arthur I of Brittany and John of England.
- 1204: Islamization of Bengal by Bakhtiyar Khalji and oppression of Buddhism in East India.
- 1204: Fourth Crusade of 1202–1204 captures Zadar for Venice and sacks Byzantine Constantinople, creating the Latin Empire.
- 1204: Fall of Normandy from Angevin hands to the French King, Philip Augustus, end of Norman domination of France.
- 1205: The Battle of Adrianople occurred on April 14 between Bulgarians under Tsar Kaloyan of Bulgaria, and Crusaders under Baldwin I, (July 1172 – 1205), the first emperor of the Latin Empire of Constantinople.
- 1206: Genghis Khan is declared Great Khan of the Mongols.
- 1206: The Delhi Sultanate is established in Northern India under the Mamluk Dynasty.
- 1209: Francis of Assisi founds the Franciscan Order.
- 1209: The Albigensian Crusade is declared by Pope Innocent III.

=== 1210s ===
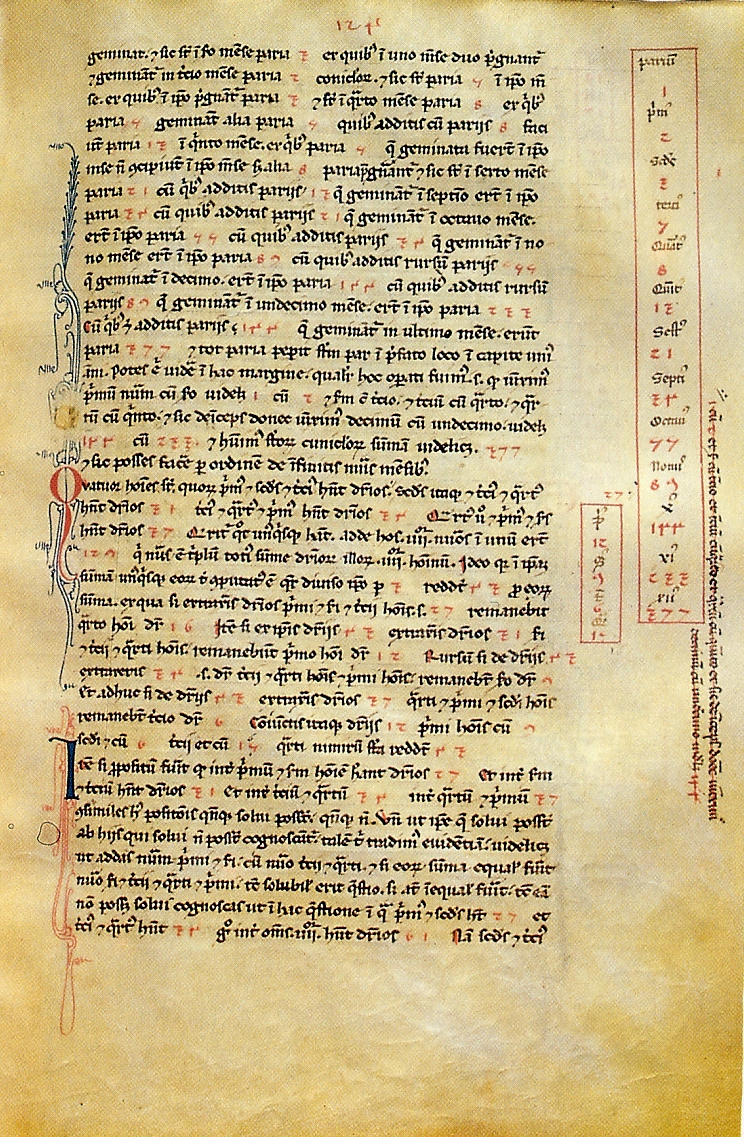
A page of the Italian Fibonacci's Liber Abaci from the Biblioteca Nazionale di Firenze showing the Fibonacci sequence with the position in the sequence labeled in Roman numerals and the value in Arabic-Hindu numerals.

- 1210: Qutb-ud-Din Aibak, the first ruler of the Delhi Sultanate, fell down from a horse while playing chovgan (a form of polo on horseback) in Lahore and died instantly when the pommel of the saddle pierced his ribs.
- 1212: The Battle of Las Navas de Tolosa in Iberia marks the beginning of a rapid Christian reconquest of the southern half of the Iberian Peninsula, mainly from 1230–1248, with the defeat of Moorish forces.
- 1212: Frederick of Sicily is crowned King of the Romans at Mainz.
- 1213: The Kingdom of France defeats the Crown of Aragon at the Battle of Muret.
- 1214: France defeats the English and Imperial German forces at the Battle of Bouvines.
- 1215: King John signs Magna Carta at Runnymede.
- 1216: Battle of Lipitsa between Russian principalities.
- 1216: Maravarman Sundara I reestablishes the Pandya Dynasty in Southern India
- 1217–1221: Fifth Crusade captures Egyptian Ayyubid port city of Damietta; ultimately the Crusaders withdraw.
- 1219: official recognition of an independent national Church in Europe, the Serbian Archbishopric.

=== 1220s ===
Mongol Empire in 1227 at Genghis Khan's death

- c. 1220: The Kingdom of Mapungubwe was established
- 1220: Frederick II, Holy Roman Emperor is crowned in Rome
- 1221: Merv, Herat, Bamyan and Nishapur are destroyed in the Mongol invasion of the Khwarazmian Empire.
- 1222: Andrew II of Hungary signs the Golden Bull which affirms the privileges of Hungarian nobility.
- 1223: The Signoria of the Republic of Venice is formed and consists of the Doge, the Minor Council, and the three leaders of the Quarantia.
- 1223: The Mongol Empire defeats various Russian principalities at the Battle of the Kalka River.
- 1223: Volga Bulgaria defeats the army of the Mongol Empire at the Battle of Samara Bend.
- 1225: Trần dynasty of Vietnam was established by Emperor Trần Thái Tông's ascension to the throne after his uncle Trần Thủ Độ orchestrated the overthrow of the Lý dynasty.
- 1226–1250: Dispute between the so-called second Lombard League and Emperor Frederick II.
- 1227: Estonians are finally subjugated to German crusader rule during the Livonian Crusade.
- 1227: Genghis Khan dies.
- 1228–1229: Sixth Crusade under the excommunicated Emperor Frederick II, who returns Jerusalem to the Crusader States in a negotiated settlement with the Sultan of Egypt, Al-Kamil
- 1228–1230: First clash between Gregory IX and Emperor Frederick II.

=== 1230s ===
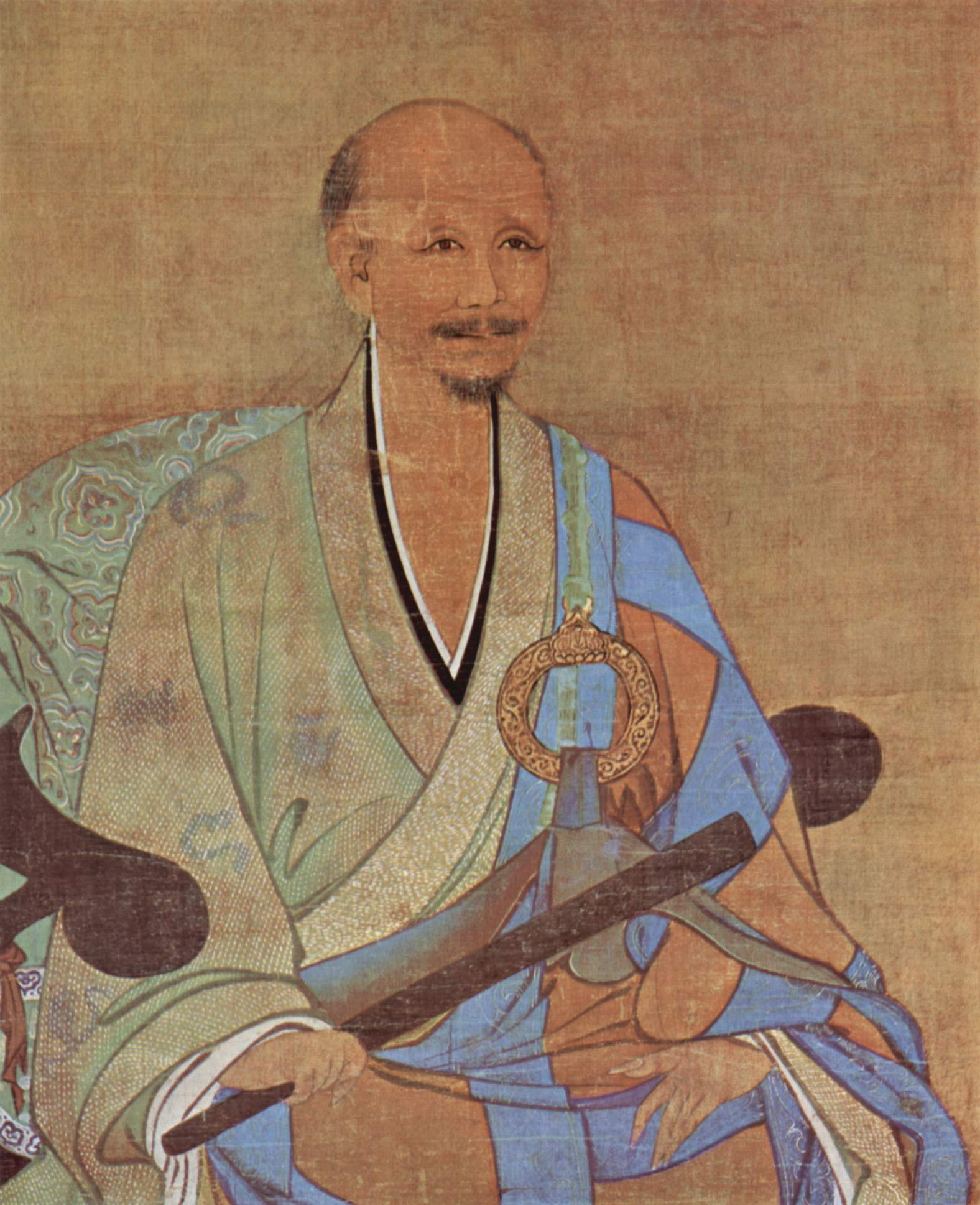
Portrait of the Chinese Zen Buddhist Wuzhun Shifan, painted in 1238, Song dynasty.

- 1231: Emperor Frederick II promulgates the Constitutions of Melfi, a far-reaching legal code influential in the development of continental European statehood.
- 1232: The Mongols besiege Kaifeng, the capital of the Jin dynasty, capturing it in the following year.
- 1233: Battle of Ganter, Ken Arok defeated Kertajaya, the last king of Kediri, thus established Singhasari kingdom Ken Arok ended the reign of Isyana Dynasty and started his own Rajasa dynasty.
- 1235: The Mandinka kingdoms unite to form the Mali Empire which leads to the downfall of Sosso in the 1230s.
- 1237: Emperor Frederick II virtually annihilates the forces of the second Lombard League at the Battle of Cortenuova.
- 1239–1250: Third conflict between the Holy Roman Empire and the Papacy.
- 1237–1240: Mongol Empire conquers Kievan Rus.
- 1238: Sukhothai becomes the first capital of Sukhothai Kingdom.

=== 1240s ===
- 1240: Russians defeat the Swedish army at the Battle of the Neva.
- 1241: Mongol Empire defeats Hungary at the Battle of Mohi and defeats Poland at the Battle of Legnica. Hungary and Poland ravaged.
- 1241: Mongol Empire under Tair Bahadur besiege the city of Lahore at the Siege of Lahore (1241)
- 1242: Russians defeat the Teutonic Knights at the Battle of Lake Peipus.
- 1243–1250: Second Holy Roman Empire–Papacy War.
- 1244: Ayyubids and Khwarezmians defeat the Crusaders and their Muslim allies at the Battle of La Forbie.
- 1249: End of the Portuguese Reconquista against the Moors, when King Afonso III of Portugal reconquers the Algarve.
- 1248–1254: Seventh Crusade captures Egyptian Ayyubid port city of Damietta, crusaders ultimately withdraw, after the capture of French king Louis IX. Mamelukes overthrow Ayyubid Dynasty.

=== 1250s ===
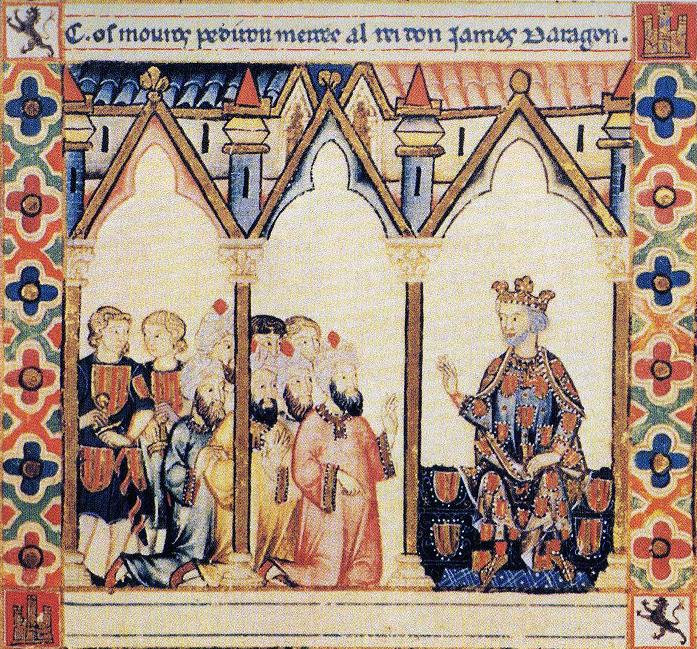
The Moors request permission from James I of Aragón, from the Cantigas de Santa Maria

- By 1250, Pensacola culture, through trade, begins influencing Coastal Coles Creek culture.
- 1250: The Mamluk dynasty is founded in Egypt.
- 1250: Death of Emperor Frederick II on December 13th.
- 1257: Baab Mashur Malamo established the Sultanate of Ternate in Maluku.
- 1258: Baghdad captured and destroyed by the Mongols, effective conclusion of the Abbasid Caliphate in Baghdad.
- 1258: Pandayan Emperor Jatavarman Sundara I invades Eastern India and northern Sri Lanka.
- 1259: Treaty of Paris is signed between Louis IX and Henry III

=== 1260s ===
- 1260: Mongols first major war defeat in the Battle of Ain Jalut against the Egyptians.
- 1260: Toluid Civil War begins between Kublai Khan and Ariq Böke for the title of Great Khan.
- 1261: Byzantines under Michael VIII retake Constantinople from the Crusaders and Venice.
- 1262: Iceland brought under Norwegian rule, with the Old Covenant.
- 1265: Dominican theologian Thomas Aquinas begins to write his Summa Theologiae.
- 1268: Fall of the Crusader State of Antioch to the Egyptians.

=== 1270s ===
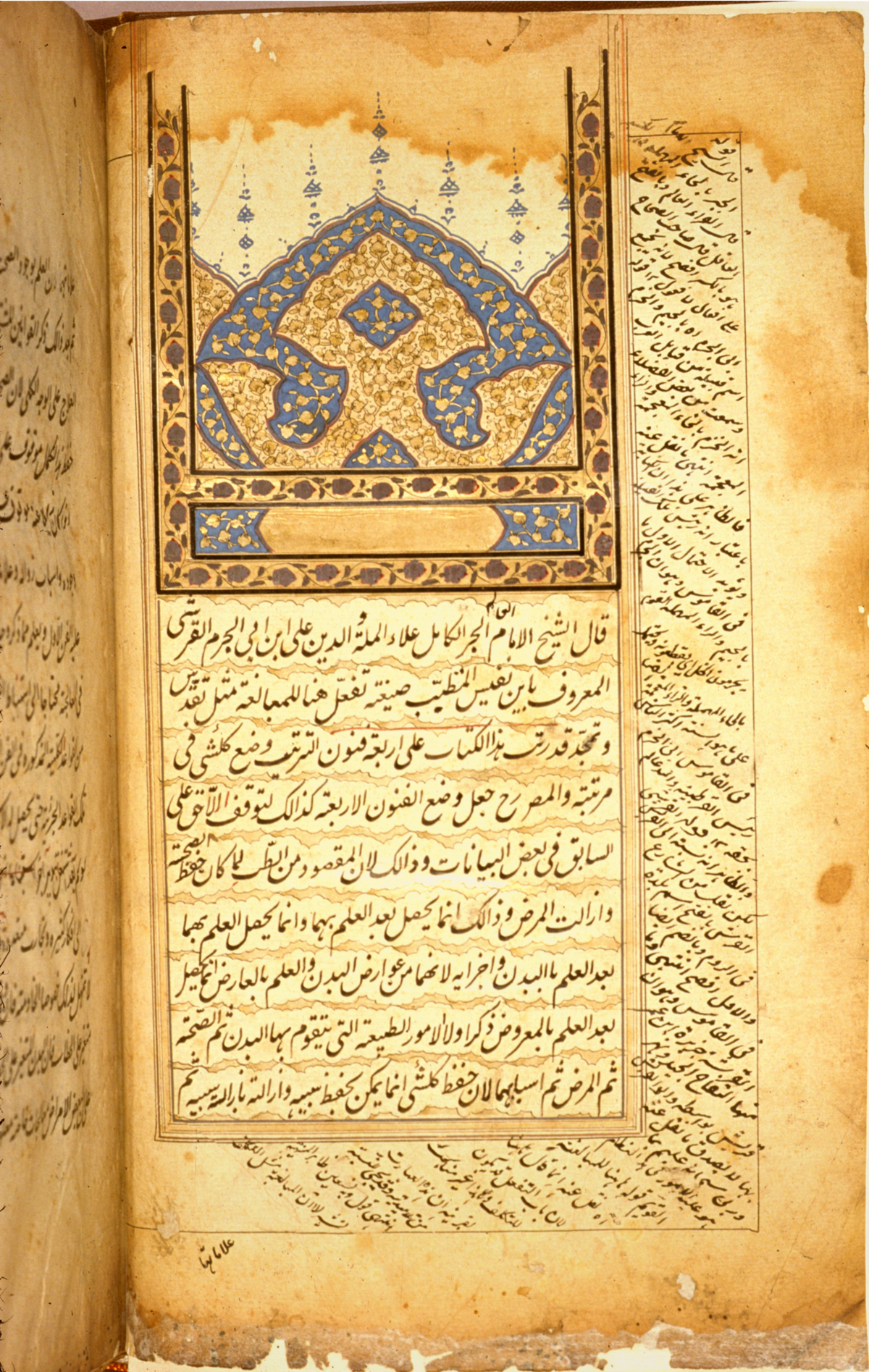
The opening page of one of Ibn al-Nafis' medical works. This is probably a copy made in India during the 17th or 18th century.

- 1270: Goryeo dynasty swears allegiance to the Yuan dynasty.
- 1270: The Zagwe dynasty is displaced by the Solomonic dynasty.
- 1271: Edward I of England and Charles of Anjou arrive in Acre, starting the Ninth Crusade against Baibars.
- 1272–1274: Second Council of Lyon attempts to unite the churches of the Eastern Roman Empire with the Church of Rome.
- 1274: The Mongols launch their first invasion of Japan, but they are repelled by the Samurai and the Kamikaze winds.
- 1274: The Tepanec give the Mexica permission to settle at the islet Cauhmixtitlan (Eagle's Place Between the Clouds)
- 1275: Sant Dnyaneshwar who wrote Dnyaneshwari (a commentary on the Bhagavad Gita) and Amrutanubhav was born.
- 1275: King Kertanegara of Singhasari launched Pamalayu expedition against Melayu Kingdom in Sumatra (ended in 1292).
- 1276: The Mamluk-Makurian War (1272-1276) ends in a Mamluk victory under Sultan Baybars and the deposition of David II.
- 1277: Passage of the last and most important of the Paris Condemnations by Bishop Tempier, which banned a number of Aristotelian propositions.
- 1279: The Song dynasty ends after losing the Battle of Yamen to the Mongols.
- 1279: The Chola Dynasty in Southern India officially comes to an end.

=== 1280s ===
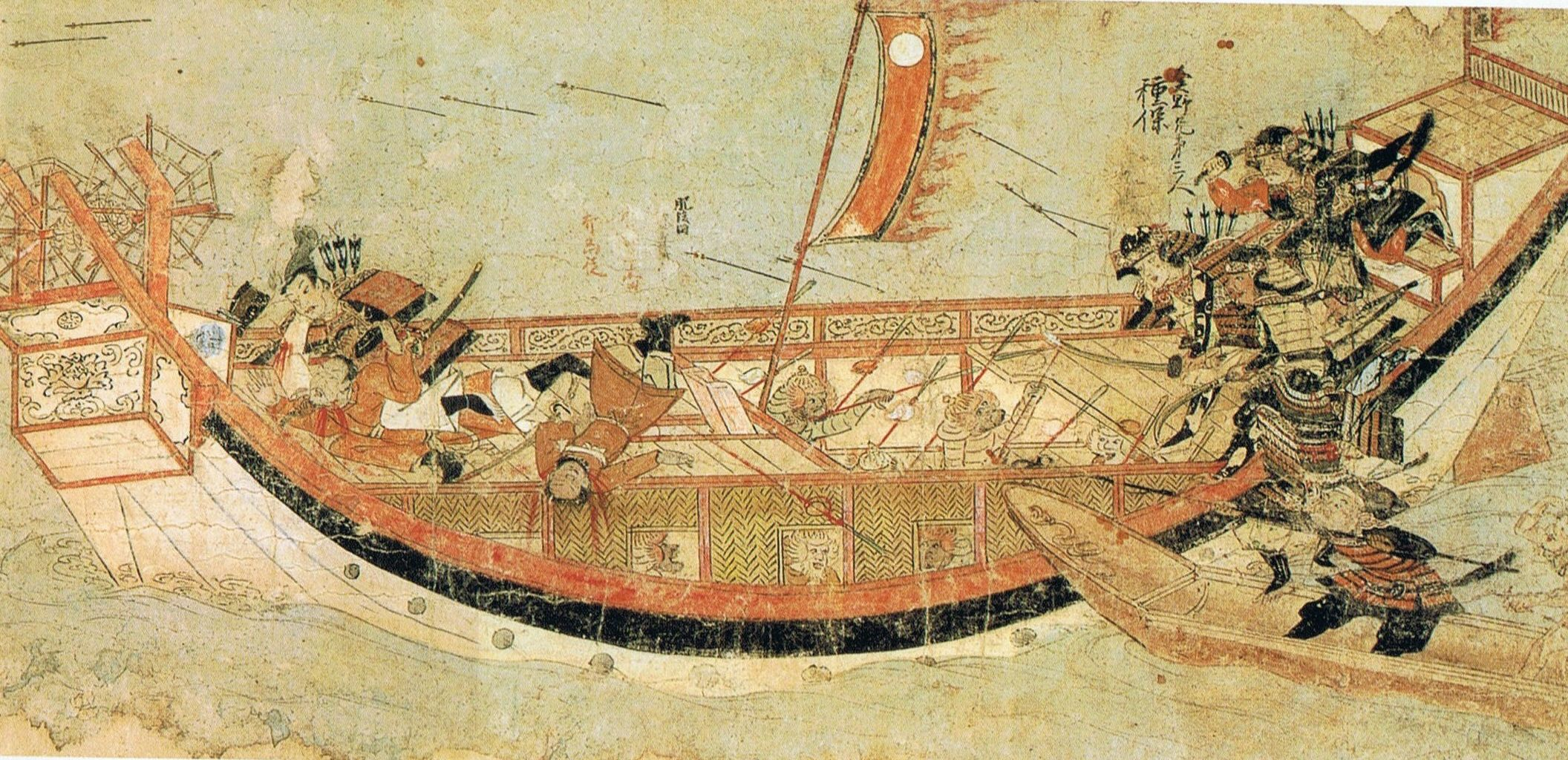
Japanese samurai boarding a Mongol vessel during the Mongol invasions of Japan, depicted in the Mōko Shūrai Ekotoba, 1293

- 1281: The Mongols launch their second invasion of Japan, but like their first invasion they are repelled by the Samurai and the Kamikaze winds.
- 1282: Aragon acquires Sicily after the Sicilian Vespers.
- 1284: Peterhouse, Cambridge founded by Hugo de Balsham, the Bishop of Ely.
- 1284: King Kertanegara launches the Pabali expedition to Bali, integrating Bali into the Singhasari territory.
- 1285: Second Mongol raid against Hungary, led by Nogai Khan.
- 1289: The County of Tripoli falls to the Bahri Mamluks led by Qalawun.
- 1289: Kertanegara insulted the envoy of Kublai Khan, who demanded that Java pay tribute to the Yuan Dynasty.

=== 1290–1300 ===
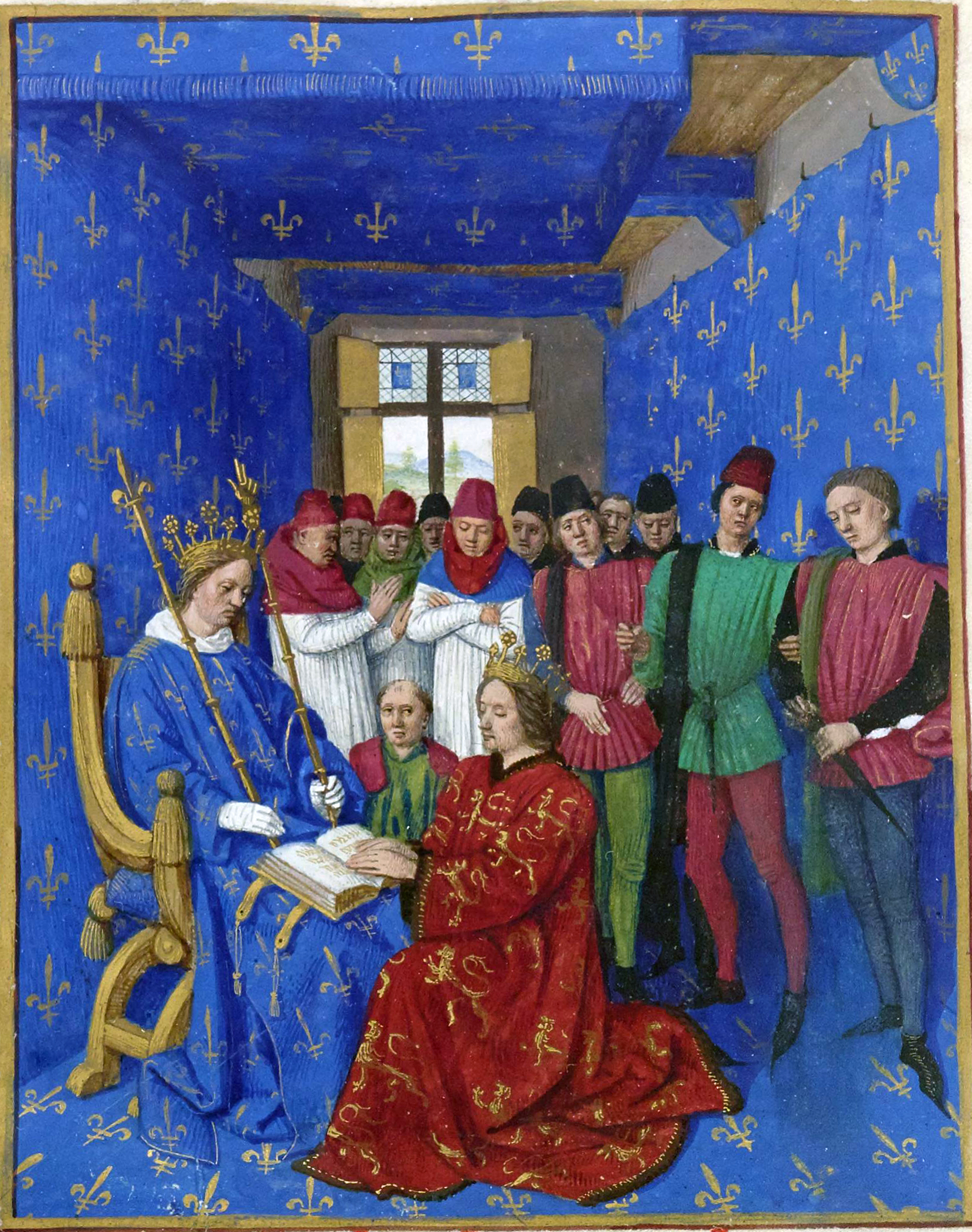
Hommage of Edward I (kneeling), to the Philippe le Bel (seated). As duke of Aquitaine, Edward was a vassal to the French king.

- The Mamluk Dynasty comes to an end and is replaced by the Khalji dynasty.
- 1290: By the Edict of Expulsion, King Edward I of England orders all Jews to leave the Kingdom of England.
- 1291: The Swiss Confederation of Uri, Schwyz, and Unterwalden forms.
- 1291: Mamluk Sultan of Egypt al-Ashraf Khalil captures Acre, thus ending the Crusader Kingdom of Jerusalem (the last Christian state remaining from the Crusades).
- 1292: Jayakatwang, duke of Kediri, rebels and kills Kertanegara, ending the Singhasari kingdom.
- 1292: Marco Polo, on his voyage from China to Persia, visits Sumatra and reports that, on the northern part of Sumatra, there were six trading ports, including Ferlec, Samudera and Lambri.
- 1292: King Mangrai founds the Lanna kingdom.
- 1293: Mongol invasion of Java. Kublai Khan of Yuan dynasty China, sends punitive attack against Kertanegara of Singhasari, who repels the Mongol forces.
- 1293: On 10 November, the coronation of Nararya Sangramawijaya as monarch, marks the foundation of the Hindu Majapahit kingdom in eastern Java.
- 1296: First War of Scottish Independence begins.
- 1297: Membership in the Mazor Consegio or the Great Council of Venice of the Venetian Republic is sealed and limited in the future to only those families whose names have been inscribed therein.
- 1299: Ottoman Empire is established under Osman I.
- 1300: Islam is likely established in the Aceh region.
- 1300: Aji Batara Agung Dewa Sakti founds the Kingdom of Kutai Kartanegara/Sultanate of Kutai in the Tepian Batu or Kutai Lama.
- 1300: The city of Bilbao was founded.
- 1300: The Turku Cathedral was consecrated in Turku.
- 1300: Sri Rajahmura Lumaya, known in his shortened name Sri Lumay, a half-Tamil and half Malay minor prince of the Chola dynasty in Sumatra established the Indianized Rajahnate of Cebu in Cebu Island on the Philippine Archipelago.

== Inventions, discoveries, introductions ==
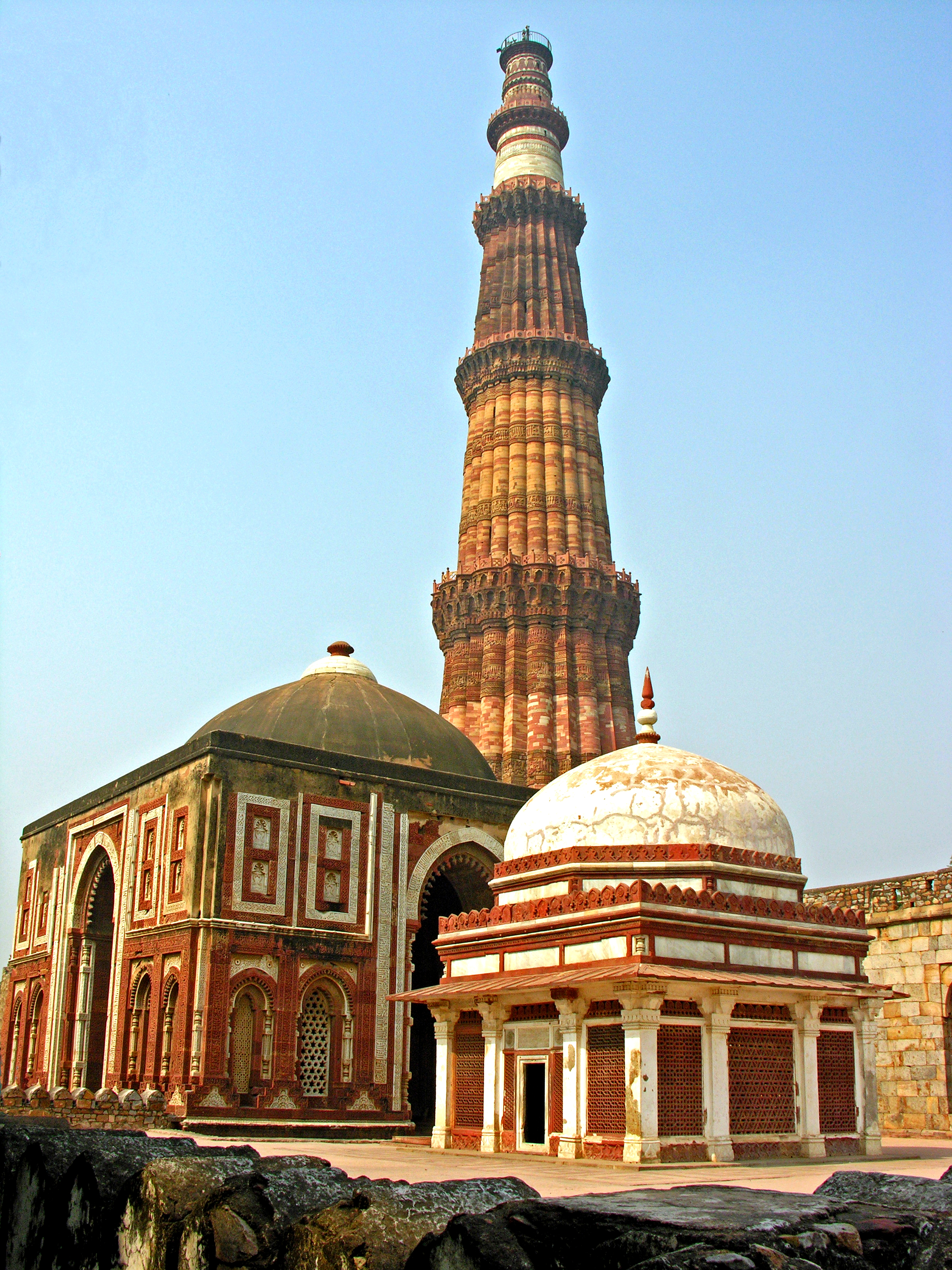
Alai Gate and Qutub Minar were built during the Mamluk and Khalji dynasties of the Delhi Sultanate.

- Early 13th century – Xia Gui paints Twelve Views from a Thatched Hut, during the Southern Song dynasty (now in Nelson-Atkins Museum of Art, Kansas City, Missouri).
- The motet form originates out of the Ars antiqua tradition of Western European music.
- Manuscript culture develops out of this time period in cities in Europe, which denotes a shift from monasteries to cities for books.
- Pecia system of copying books develops in Italian university-towns and was taken up by the University of Paris in the middle of the century.
- Wooden movable type printing invented by Chinese governmental minister Wang Zhen in 1298.
- The earliest known rockets, landmines, and handguns are made by the Chinese for use in warfare.
- The Chinese adopt the windmill from the Islamic world.
- Guan ware vase is made, Southern Song dynasty. It is now kept at Percival David Foundation of Chinese Art, London.
- 1250 – Cliff Palace, Mesa Verde, and other Ancestral Pueblo architectural complexes reach their apex
- 1280s – Eyeglasses are invented in Venice, Italy.
- Late 13th century – Night Attack on the Sanjo Palace is made during the Kamakura period. It is now kept at Museum of Fine Arts, Boston.
- Late 13th century – Descent of the Amida Trinity, raigo triptych, is made, Kamakura period. It is now kept at the Art Institute of Chicago.
- The Neo-Aramaic languages begin to develop during the course of the century.

== See also ==
- Christianity in the 13th century
