= 1288 in Ireland =

- Centuries: 11th; 12th; 13th; 14th; 15th
- Decades: 1260s; 1270s; 1280s; 1290s; 1300s
- See also: Other events of 1288; List of years in Ireland

Events from the year 1288 in Ireland.

== Incumbent ==
- Lord: Edward I

== Events ==
- William de Beverley became Lord Chancellor of Ireland
