= 1290 in Ireland =

- Centuries: 11th; 12th; 13th; 14th; 15th
- Decades: 1270s; 1280s; 1290s; 1300s; 1310s
- See also: Other events of 1290; List of years in Ireland

Events from the year 1290 in Ireland.

== Incumbent ==
- Lord: Edward I

== Events ==
- 18 July – the Edict of Expulsion is issued expelling all Jews from England and Ireland by 1 November.
- White Abbey, Kildare, is founded by William de Vesci; it is run by Carmelite friars.

== Births ==
- Thomas FitzGerald, 3rd Baron Desmond

== Deaths ==
- Sithric "Carrach in Cairn" Mág Tighearnán
