= 1292 in Ireland =

- Centuries: 11th; 12th; 13th; 14th; 15th
- Decades: 1270s; 1280s; 1290s; 1300s; 1310s
- See also: Other events of 1292; List of years in Ireland

Events from the year 1292 in Ireland.

== Incumbent ==
- Lord: Edward I

== Events ==
- Custody of rents, homages and services of all Crown tenants English and Irish in the Decies and Desmond is granted to Thomas fitz Maurice of Desmond.
- Thomas Cantock, Bishop of Emly became Lord Chancellor of Ireland
