= 1296 in Ireland =

- Centuries: 11th; 12th; 13th; 14th; 15th
- Decades: 1270s; 1280s; 1290s; 1300s; 1310s
- See also: Other events of 1296; List of years in Ireland

Events from the year 1296 in Ireland.

== Incumbent ==
- Lord: Edward I

== Deaths ==
- Thomas FitzGerald, 2nd Baron Desmond
