= 1295 in Ireland =

- Centuries: 11th; 12th; 13th; 14th; 15th
- Decades: 1270s; 1280s; 1290s; 1300s; 1310s
- See also: Other events of 1295; List of years in Ireland

Events from the year 1295 in Ireland.

== Incumbent ==
- Lord: Edward I

== Events ==
- John Wogan was appointed Justiciar of Ireland
- Matthew M'Catasaid rebuilt St Macartan's Cathedral, Clogher
- Roscrea Castle, originally a wooden structure, was completed in stone

== Deaths ==
- Domnall Mór Ua Briain, King of Thomond
- Domnall Ó Cellaigh, King of Uí Maine and Chief of the Name
