= 1299 in Ireland =

- Centuries: 11th; 12th; 13th; 14th; 15th
- Decades: 1270s; 1280s; 1290s; 1300s; 1310s
- See also: Other events of 1299; List of years in Ireland

Events from the year 1299 in Ireland.

== Incumbent ==
- Lord: Edward I

== Events ==
- The earliest mention of the Curragh in legal documents was 1299 when an Act was passed to prevent swine from feeding on the Curragh plains to the detriment of the sward.
- Edward I grants Hugh Bisset the authority to receive "any tenant from the islands of the kingdom of Scotland", except nobles and knights, into the king of England's peace.

== Births ==
- Richard FitzRalph
