= Alboino I della Scala =

Veronese nobleman (died 1311)

- Born: Verona
- Died: 29 November 1311; Verona
- Noble family: Scaliger
- Spouses: Caterina Visconti; Betrice da Corregio
- Issue: Alberto II della Scala; Mastino II della Scala
- Father: Alberto I della Scala
- Mother: Verde da Salizzole

Alboino I della Scala (died 29 November 1311) was the Scaliger Lord of Verona from 1304 until his death.

Alboino was the second son of Alberto I della Scala and Verde da Salizzole. The date of his birth is unknown, but he was recorded as being "very young" in 1289. In 1298 he had married Caterina Visconti, daughter of Matteo I Visconti; eight years later Alboino remarried with Betrice, daughter of Gilberto III da Correggio.

On the death of his older brother Bartolomeo on 7 or 8 March 1304, Alboino succeeded him as Lord of Verona. From 1308 on Alboino associated his younger brother Cangrande as co-ruler. The Scaligers profited from their support for the Holy Roman Emperor, Henry VII. During Henry's descent into Italy in 1311, he appointed Alboino and Cangrande as Imperial vicars for Verona and its territory.

Alboino died on 29 November 1311 and was succeeded by Cangrande I, who ruled until his death in 1329 and expanded the Veronese domain into a major territorial state. After Cangrande's death, Alboino's sons Alberto II and Mastino II ruled Verona.

Apart from his two sons, Alboino also had two daughters: from his first marriage Alboina (born c. 1309), who became abbess of the monastery of San Michele in Campagna, and from his second marriage Verde, who in 1317 married Rizzardo da Camino.

== Sources ==
- Carrara, M. (1966). Gli Scaligeri. Varese: Dell'Oglio.
- Mennini Ippolito, Antonio (1986). "Della Scala". Lexikon des Mittelalters, III: Codex Wintoniensis bis Erziehungs- und Bildungswesen (in German). Stuttgart and Weimar: J. B. Metzler. col. 676–678. ISBN 3-7608-8903-4.
- Varanini, Gian Maria (1989). "DELLA SCALA, Alboino". Dizionario Biografico degli Italiani (in Italian). Vol. 37: Della Fratta–Della Volpaia. Rome: Istituto dell'Enciclopedia Italiana. ISBN 978-88-12-00032-6.

Alboino I della Scala Scaliger Born: c. 1284 Died: 29 November 1311
Preceded by Bartolomeo I	Lord of Verona; 1304–1311 with Cangrande I (1308–1311)	Succeeded by Cangrande I
