= 1248 =

1248 in various calendars
Gregorian calendar	1248; MCCXLVIII
Ab urbe condita	2001
Armenian calendar	697; ԹՎ ՈՂԷ
Assyrian calendar	5998
Balinese saka calendar	1169–1170
Bengali calendar	654–655
Berber calendar	2198
English Regnal year	32 Hen. 3 – 33 Hen. 3
Buddhist calendar	1792
Burmese calendar	610
Byzantine calendar	6756–6757
Chinese calendar	丁未年 (Fire Goat); 3945 or 3738 — to — 戊申年 (Earth Monkey); 3946 or 3739
Coptic calendar	964–965
Discordian calendar	2414
Ethiopian calendar	1240–1241
Hebrew calendar	5008–5009
- Hindu calendars
Vikram Samvat	1304–1305
Shaka Samvat	1169–1170
Kali Yuga	4348–4349
Holocene calendar	11248
Igbo calendar	248–249
Iranian calendar	626–627
Islamic calendar	645–646
Japanese calendar	Hōji 2 (宝治２年)
Javanese calendar	1157–1158
Julian calendar	1248; MCCXLVIII
Korean calendar	3581
Minguo calendar	664 before ROC 民前664年
Nanakshahi calendar	−220
Thai solar calendar	1790–1791
Tibetan calendar	མེ་མོ་ལུག་ལོ་ (female Fire-Sheep); 1374 or 993 or 221 — to — ས་ཕོ་སྤྲེ་ལོ་ (male Earth-Monkey); 1375 or 994 or 222

Map of Seventh Crusade (1248–1254)

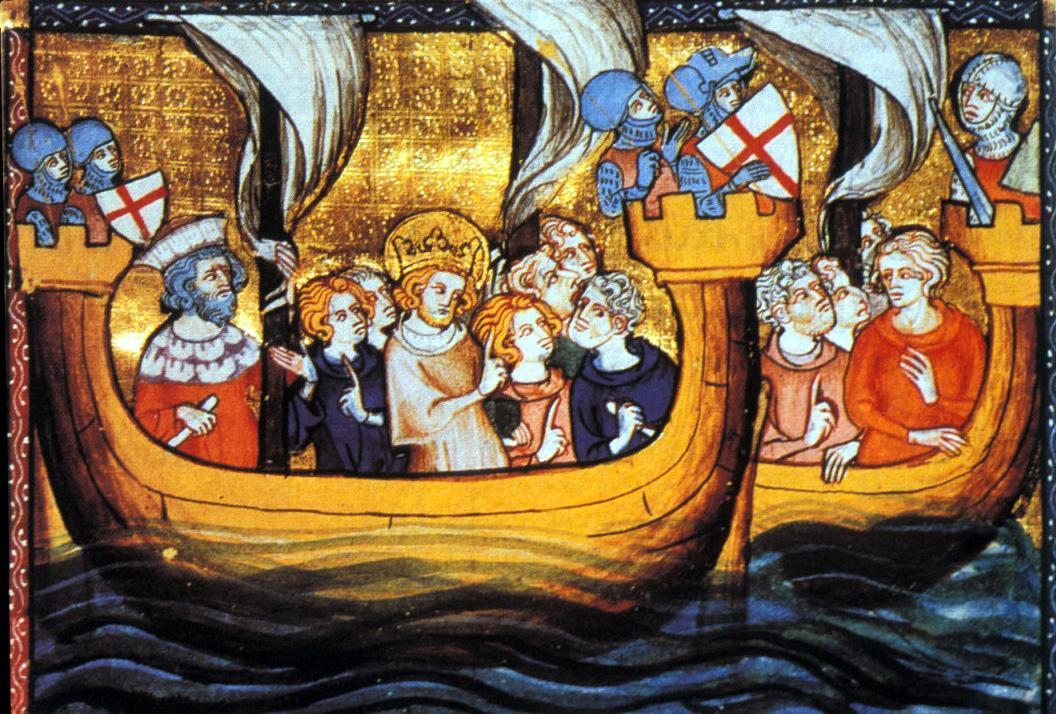
Louis IX of France (middle) during the Seventh Crusade

Year 1248 (MCCXLVIII) was a leap year starting on Wednesday of the Julian calendar.

== Events ==
=== By place ===
==== Seventh Crusade ====
- August 12 – King Louis IX of France ("the Saint") leaves Paris together with his wife, Queen Margaret of Provence, and her sister Beatrice of Provence. Two of Louis' brothers, Charles of Anjou and Robert of Artois, are also present. He is followed by his cousins, Hugh IV of Burgundy and Peter Mauclerc, both are veterans of the Barons' Crusade.
- August 25 – Louis IX departs from Aigues-Mortes and Marseilles with a French expeditionary force (some 10,000 men) transported by 100 ships. An English detachment (some 5,000 men) under William Longespée the Younger, grandson of King Henry III, and his mistress Ida de Tosny follows close behind with 36 transport ships.
- September 17 – Louis IX arrives at Limassol on the island of Cyprus. He gathers his forces and is well received by King Henry I of Cyprus ("the Fat"). The Crusaders are supplemented by nobles from Acre, including Grand Masters Jean de Ronay and Guillaume de Sonnac. Louis prepares a plan of campaign, with Egypt as the prime objective.
- December – Louis IX receives an embassy during his stay in Cyprus from the Mongol general, Eljigidei, who is viceroy in Persia. They bring a letter from Guyuk Khan (who had died by the time his envoys reached Cyprus) with no demands of submission, but talking in terms about Mongol favouritism for Christianity, and a proposal of a joint invasion against the Ayyubid forces in Syria.
- December – Louis IX decides to spend the winter on Cyprus to make preparations against Egypt. Meanwhile, the nobles persuade him to start negotiations with Sultan As-Salih Ayyub to intervene in the internal Ayyubid affairs. But Louis rejects this offer and orders the Knights Templar to break off their negotiations with As-Salih.

==== Europe ====
- February 18 – Battle of Parma: Imperial forces (some 6,000 men) under Emperor Frederick II are defeated by the Lombard League at Parma. Much of Frederick's treasure is lost, while he is hunting in the Taro Valley.
- November 23 – Reconquista: Siege of Seville: Castilian forces under King Ferdinand III of Castile ("the Saint") recapture the city of Seville from the Almohads, after a 16-month siege. Prince Alfonso X of Castile takes the city of Alicante.
- November 24–25 – In the middle of the night a mass on the north side of Mont Granier suddenly collapses, in one of the largest historical rock slope failures.
- December – William of Villehardouin, Latin ruler of the Principality of Achaea, captures Monemvasia – last remaining Byzantine outpost on the Peloponnese.
- December – Reconquista: Ferdinand III issues an edict to expel the Almohads out of Seville. Many Muslims sail to North Africa and others travel to Granada in Al-Andalus.

=== By topic ===
==== Cities and Towns ====
- August 25 – The Dutch city of Ommen receives city rights and fortification rights from Otto III, archbishop of Utrecht, after the town has been pillaged by a local robber baron.

==== Religion ====
- April 26 – The Gothic chapel Sainte-Chapelle (Holy Chapel) is completed and consecrated in Paris. Louis IX moves the relics of the True Cross and Holy Lance to the chapel with great ceremony.
- August 15 – The foundation stone of Cologne Cathedral is laid by Archbishop Konrad von Hochstaden, after the older cathedral is burned down on April 30 (construction is completed in 1880).
- Pope Innocent IV grants the Croatians of southern Dalmatia permission to use their own language and script in the Roman Rite liturgy (see Glagolitic alphabet).

== Births ==
- July 21 – Bogo de Clare, English cleric and writer (d. 1294)
- December 22 – Ichijō Ietsune, Japanese nobleman (d. 1293)
- Abu Said Faraj, Andalusian advisor and governor (d. 1320)
- Angela of Foligno, Italian nun, mystic and writer (d. 1309)
- Gao Kegong (or Fang Shan), Chinese painter (d. 1310)
- Hōjō Akitoki, Japanese military leader and poet (d. 1301)
- Kujō Tadanori, Japanese nobleman and regent (d. 1332)
- Peter John Olivi, French monk and theologian (d. 1298)
- Yeshe Rinchen, Tibetan Imperial Preceptor (d. 1294)
- Zaynab bint al-Kamal, Syrian female scholar (d. 1339)
- Approximate date – Blanche of Artois, queen and regent of Navarre (d. 1302)

== Deaths ==
- January 4 – Sancho II ("the Pious"), king of Portugal (b. 1209)
- January 18 – Fujiwara no Ritsushi, Japanese empress (b. 1192)
- February 1 – Henry II, Dutch nobleman and knight (b. 1207)
- February 9 – Al-Adil II, Ayyubid ruler of Egypt and Damascus
- February 18 – Taddeo da Suessa, Italian jurist and diplomat
- February 25 – Bolesław I of Masovia, Polish prince (b. 1208)
- March 27 – Maud Marshal, English noblewoman (b. 1192)
- April 9 – Hugh I of Châtillon, French nobleman and knight
- April 20 – Güyük Khan (or Kuyuk), Mongol emperor (b. 1206)
- June 19 – Otto III of Merania, French nobleman and knight
- August 7 – Giordano Forzatè, Italian religious leader (b. 1158)
- September 13 – Kunigunde, Bohemian queen consort (b. 1202)
- c. October 28 – Walter Mauclerk, English bishop, diplomat and Treasurer
- November/December – Richard Siward, English adventurer and knight banneret
- December 26 – Theobald Butler, Irish chief governor (b. 1224)
- Al-Qifti, Egyptian scholar, historian and biographer (b. 1172)
- Haraldr Óláfsson, Scottish ruler of the Kingdom of the Isles, drowned (b. 1223/4)
- Hermann von Buxhövden, Livonian prince-bishop (b. 1163)
- Ibn al-Baitar, Andalusian physician and scientist (b. 1197)
- John Blund, English archbishop and philosopher (b. 1175)
- Koga Michiteru, Japanese nobleman and poet (b. 1187)
- Richard Fishacre, English theologian and writer (b. 1200)
- Shams Tabrizi, Persian poet and philosopher (b. 1185)
- Subutai, Mongol general and military strategist (b. 1175)
- Yolande of Dreux, duchess consort of Burgundy (b. 1212)
- Probable date – John of Monmouth, Norman nobleman and knight (b. 1182)
