= Mastino della Scala =

Mastino della Scala may refer to:

- Mastino I della Scala
- Mastino II della Scala
