= 1302 in Ireland =

- Centuries: 12th; 13th; 14th; 15th; 16th
- Decades: 1280s; 1290s; 1300s; 1310s; 1320s
- See also: Other events of 1302; List of years in Ireland

Events from the year 1302 in Ireland.

== Incumbent ==
- Lord: Edward I

== Events ==
- Fulk de la Freigne becomes seneschal of the Liberty of Kilkenny.
- Alice Kyteler and her second husband, Adam le Blund, are accused of homicide. She was later the first person in Ireland to be condemned for alleged witchcraft.

== Deaths ==
- Stephen O'Braccan, Archbishop of Cashel
