= Mastino I della Scala =

Italian condottiero

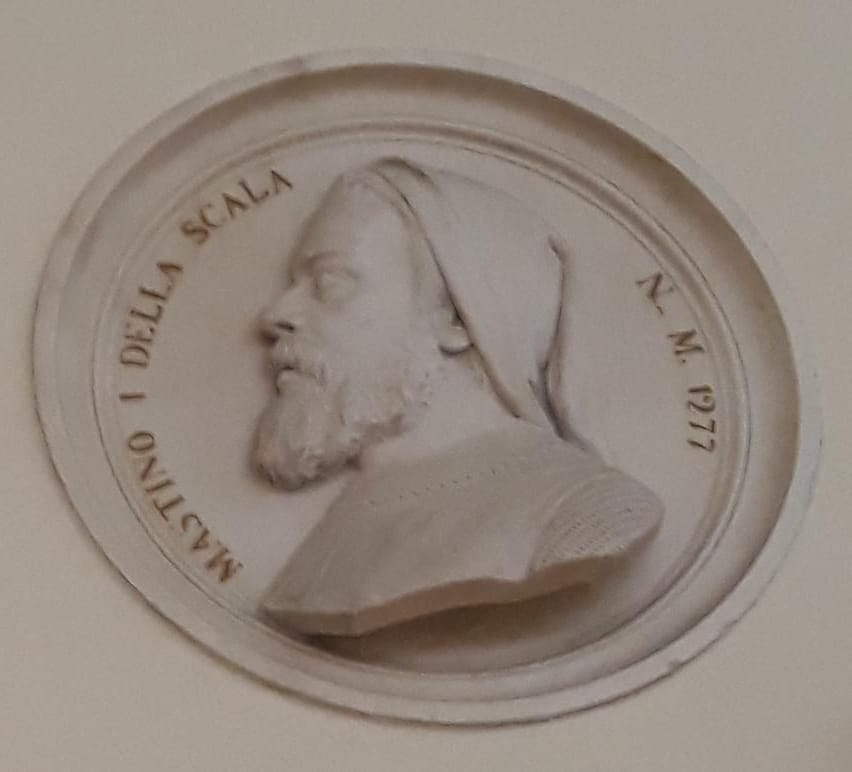
- Died: 26 October 1277
- Noble family: Scaliger
- Father: Jacopino della Scala
- Mother: Elisa Superbi

Mastino I della Scala (died 26 October 1277), born Leonardo or Leonardino, was an Italian aristocrat who founded the Scaliger house of the Lords of Verona.

Mastino was the son of Jacopino della Scala and brother of Alberto I della Scala, his eventual successor. Along with the rest of his family, Mastino was a supporter of the Ghibelline leader Ezzelino III da Romano, for whom Mastino served as podestà of Cerea in 1258, and of Verona itself from January 1259. When Ezzelino died in 1259, the Veronese guilds elected Mastino to the position of podestà del popolo. Although he was the de facto leader of the city, Mastino did not hold a single title or office that designated him as such; rather he held different high offices through which he exercised his influence over the Veronese commune. From 1261 to 1269 he was podestà of the Casa dei Mercanti, a position which gave him control over all production and commerce in the city, and which he combined from 1262 on with that of capitano del popolo ("people's captain"). Mastino's policies were a continuation of Ezzelino's, keeping the Guelph faction and other exiles away and securing political and economic stability.

In 1264 he led the Veronese army to the conquest of Lonigo and Montebello, menacing Vicenza. He was also able to shortly annex the lands of the bishop of Trent. Mastino also obtained an agreement with the Republic of Venice which granted to the Veronese free access to trades on the Adige River and signed a treaty of peace with the Guelph city of Mantua.

In 1267, when Conradin, last of the Hohenstaufen, descended into Italy to reconquer the Kingdom of Sicily, Mastino allied with him. Pope Clement IV, ally of the current King of Naples Charles I of Anjou, excommunicated Conradin and all his Ghibelline supporters, including Mastino and Verona itself. The excommunication was raised only when, a few years later, 166 Cathars captured in Sirmione were publicly burnt alive in the Arena.

During the Mastino's absence, a civil war broke out, spurred by the counts of San Bonifacio, who managed to capture most of Scaliger's garrisons. Mastino's brother Bocca died during the fighting. Mastino's reaction was however stiff, and he soon defeated the rebels. He also managed to impose his brother Alberto as podestà of Mantua, which had been the traditional supporter of the Veronese anti-Scaliger exiles.

Mastino was assassinated in Verona in October 1277 by a member of the local aristocracy who was averse to the rule of the Scaliger; the alleged involvement of Alberto in the conspiracy is unproven.

Alberto himself, already appointed as his brother's successor as potestas mercartorum since 1269, was immediately voted to succeed Mastino as life-long captain and rector of the city, thus firmly establishing Verona as a lordship (signoria). Verona remained under della Scala rule until 1387.

== Sources ==
- Carrara, M. (1966). Gli Scaligeri. Varese: Dell'Oglio.
- Mennini Ippolito, Antonio (1986). "Della Scala". Lexikon des Mittelalters, III: Codex Wintoniensis bis Erziehungs- und Bildungswesen (in German). Stuttgart and Weimar: J. B. Metzler. col. 676–678. ISBN 3-7608-8903-4.
- Mennini Ippolito, Antonio (1986). "Della Scala, Mastino I". Lexikon des Mittelalters, III: Codex Wintoniensis bis Erziehungs- und Bildungswesen (in German). Stuttgart and Weimar: J. B. Metzler. col. 680. ISBN 3-7608-8903-4.

Preceded by Ezzelino III da Romano as Podestà of Verona	Leader of Verona; 1259–1277	Succeeded by Alberto I as Lord of Verona
