= Alberto I della Scala =

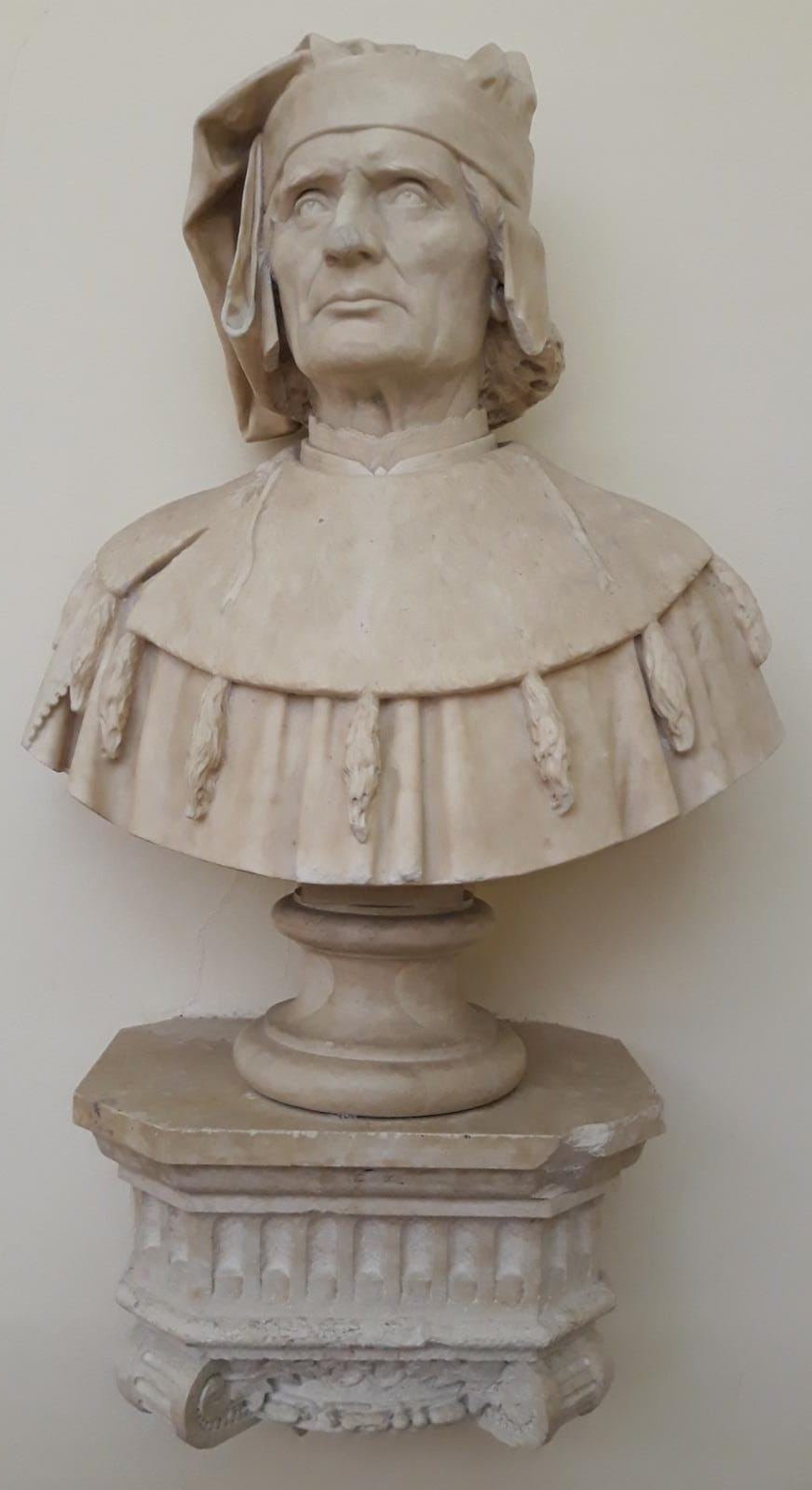
- Died: 3 September 1301; Verona
- Noble family: Scaliger
- Spouse: Verde of Salizzolo
- Issue: Bartolomeo I della Scala; Alboino I della Scala; Cangrande I della Scala
- Father: Jacopino della Scala
- Mother: Elisa Superbi

Alberto I della Scala (died 3 September 1301) was Lord of Verona from 1277, a member of the Scaliger family.

The son of Jacopino della Scala, he was podestà of Mantua in 1272 and 1275. In 1269 Alberto succeeded his brother, Mastino, who was the de facto ruler of Verona since 1259, to the office of potestas mercartorum that oversaw all production and commerce in the city.

On 27 October 1277, after the assassination of Mastino, Alberto was elected by the people's assembly as the life-long "Captain and Rector" of the gastalds and the people of Verona. Unlike his brother, whose power was not vested in a specific title, Mastino used his position to become the lord of the city: all officials were required to swear an oath of allegiance to him, he built up a bureaucracy and established an armed bodyguard loyal only to him.

Alberto further consolidated his position by marriage alliances with other Italian houses, treaties with Mantua and the Republic of Venice, and the repulsion of a Guelph attack on Verona in 1278–79. Alberto died in Verona in 1301 and was succeeded by his son Bartolomeo, who had been associated as a ruler with his father for several years. His other sons Alboino and Cangrande were also lords of Verona from 1304 and 1312, respectively. His daughter Costanza married Obizzo II d'Este, Marquis of Ferrara, as his second wife.

== Sources ==
- Carrara, M. (1966). Gli Scaligeri. Varese: Dell'Oglio.
- Mennini Ippolito, Antonio (1986). "Della Scala". Lexikon des Mittelalters, III: Codex Wintoniensis bis Erziehungs- und Bildungswesen (in German). Stuttgart and Weimar: J. B. Metzler. col. 676–678. ISBN 3-7608-8903-4.

Alberto I della Scala Scaliger Died: 3 September 1301
Preceded by Mastino I	Lord of Verona; 1277–1301	Succeeded by Bartolomeo I
