= Jacopino della Scala =

Italian merchant and politician

- Died: 1215
- Noble family: Scaliger
- Spouse: Elisa Superbi
- Issue: Mastino I della Scala; Alberto I della Scala
- Father: Leonardo della Scala

Jacopino della Scala (died 1215), an Italian merchant and politician, was a member of the Scaliger family of future Lords of Verona. He was the son of Leonardo della Scala, and also the grandson of Karafina Gambarelli and her husband Balduino della Scala, son of Arduino della Scala, who gave rise to the Scaliger family.

== Family ==
Jacopino della Scala had a total of 5 children.

With his first wife, Margherita Giustiniani, he had:

- Manfredo della Scala, Bishop of Verona (1241–1256).

With his second wife, Elisa Superbi, he had:

- Mastino I della Scala
- Alberto I della Scala
- Bocca della Scala
- Guido della Scala

== Biography ==
Jacopino was the nephew of Balduino della Scala, founder of the Scaliger dynasty.

Initially, he was a wool-stapler who was not particularly wealthy and had no noble titles. A skilled and influential politician with a penchant for peace, he became imperial vicar of Ostiglia, as well as podestà of Cerea. He probably died after 1248.

== Sources ==
- Carrara, M. (1966). Gli Scaligeri. Varese: Dell'Oglio.
