= Charles de la Cerda =

- Arms of the House de la Cerda

Count of Angoulême
- Reign: 1350–1354
- Predecessor: Joan of Navarre
- Successor: John I de Berry

Constable of France
- Reign: 1350–1354
- Predecessor: Raoul II, Count of Eu
- Successor: James I, Count of Ponthieu
- Born: 1327
- Died: 8 January 1354 (aged 26–27); L'Aigle
- House: House of la Cerda
- Father: Alfonso de la Cerda of Spain
- Mother: Isabelle d'Antoing

Charles de la Cerda, commonly known as Charles of Spain (French: Charles d'Espagne) (1327 – 8 January 1354), was a Franco-Castilian nobleman and soldier, the son of Alfonso de la Cerda of Spain (died 1327) and Isabelle d'Antoing, and grandson of Alfonso de la Cerda the disinherited (1270–1333). He was a distant cousin of John II of France.

A boyhood companion and favourite of John while he was Duke of Normandy, Charles commanded the Castilian galleys at the Battle of L'Espagnols-sur-Mer, where he was defeated by Edward III of England after a long and desperate struggle. Soon after John's accession to the throne, he was appointed Constable of France, filling the vacancy left by the execution of Raoul II, Count of Eu, and created Count of Angoulême. Vacant since the death of Joan II of Navarre in 1349, the title to Angoulême was claimed by her son, Charles II, King of Navarre, who bitterly resented La Cerda's preferment. In 1351, Charles de la Cerda married Marguerite, a daughter of Charles, Duke of Brittany.

In 1354, following an altercation with Philippe de Navarre (1336–1363), brother of Charles II of Navarre, Jean le Soult (called Le Bascon), a henchman of Charles II of Navarre, slew de la Cerda in an inn in L'Aigle. The repercussions of this murder led to a continuous state of instability within France that was only resolved upon the accession of Charles V in 1364.

== Sources ==
- Cushway, Graham (2011). Edward III and the War at Sea: The English Navy, 1327–1377. The Boydell Press.
- Farmer, Sharon (2017). The Silk Industries of Medieval Paris: Artisanal Migration, Technological Innovation, and Gendered Experience. University of Pennsylvania Press.
- Delachenal, Roland, ed. (1910). Les Grandes Chroniques de France: Chronique des règnes de Jean II et de Charles V, Tome Premier (1350–1364). Vol. I. Librairie Renouard.

French nobility
| Vacant Title last held by Joan | Count of Angoulême; 1350–1354 | Vacant Title next held by John I |
Political offices
| Vacant Title last held by Raoul II, Count of Eu | Constable of France; 1350–1354 | Vacant Title next held by James I, Count of Ponthieu |
