= Zavarise =

Italian noble family

Zavarise is a noble family from Verona, related with the Scaligeri family. The family's origins date to the 11th century. Their graves are in the church of Santi Apostoli, Verona and their palace, in which they lived until 1970, is in Mazzini street.

== History ==
The patriarch was Ulderico, who was one of the first members of the city council in 1140. The family had settlements in Valeggio, Lavagno, Cerea, Tarmassia and San Bonifacio. Florimonte Zavarise was the personal counselor of Cangrande Della Scala. In 1334 Anna married noble Francesco Bevilacqua, who became the mayor of Padua. Their marriage is celebrated in sonnets and songs by Della Scala.

One of the family's members, Manodoro Zavarise married Cecchino Della Scala. While another, Virgilio Zavarise, was a famous writer of the 15th to 16th centuries.

== General references ==
- Giovanni Solinas: Storia di Verona. Verona, anno.
- Vari / Varanini: Gli Scaligeri. Verona, 1988.
- Giovanni Rapelli: Cognomi del territorio veronese. Sommacampagna, 2007.
- Vari: Notizie delle famiglie nobili veronesi. Verona, 1851.
