= Bartolomeo I della Scala =

Italian nobleman

- Died: 7 March 1304
- Noble family: Scaliger
- Spouse: Constanza di Antiochia
- Father: Alberto I della Scala
- Mother: Verde da Salizzole

Bartolomeo I della Scala (died 7 or 8 March 1304) was lord of Verona from 1301, a member of the Scaliger family and protector of Dante during his exile from Florence.

Bartolomeo was a son of Alberto I della Scala, who during his rule (1277–1301) established Scaliger rule over Verona as a hereditary lordship. Possibly as early as 1293, Alberto associated Bartolomeo with him in ruling the city. As a result, when Alberto died in 1301, Bartolomeo immediately succeeded him as "Captain and Rector" of the gastalds and people of Verona. During his brief rule, Bartolomeo further consolidated Scaliger control, depriving the council of the guilds from its last remaining authority.

He had married in 1291 Costanza di Antiochia, daughter of Corrado d'Antiochia.

Bartolomeo died on 7 or 8 March 1304 and was succeeded by his brother Alboino.

== Sources ==
- Carrara, M. (1966). Gli Scaligeri. Varese: Dell'Oglio.
- A. Castagnetti, G. M. Varanini, Il Veneto nel medioevo: Le signorie trecentesche, Verona, Banca Popolare di Verona, 1995.
- Mennini Ippolito, Antonio (1986). "Della Scala". Lexikon des Mittelalters, III: Codex Wintoniensis bis Erziehungs- und Bildungswesen (in German). Stuttgart and Weimar: J. B. Metzler. col. 676–678. ISBN 3-7608-8903-4.

Preceded by Alberto I	Lord of Verona; 1301–1304	Succeeded by Alboino I
