= Alfonso de la Cerda (1289–1327) =

Castilian noble and archdeacon of Paris (1289–1327)

Alfonso de la Cerda of Spain
- baron of Lunel
- Arms of Alfonso de la Cerda of Spain
- Born: 1289; France
- Died: 1327 (aged 38); Gentilly, France
- Noble family: House of la Cerda
- Spouse: Isabelle d'Antoing
- Issue: Charles de la Cerda
- Father: Alfonso de la Cerda
- Mother: Matilde de Brienne

Alfonso de la Cerda, called of Spain (France, 1289 – Gentilly, France, 1327) from the Castilian House of Ivrea was Archdeacon of Paris, baron of Lunel and Lord of Tafalla & Caparroso. He was the eldest son of Alfonso de la Cerda, called "the disinherited".

== Biography ==
His father, Alfonso de la Cerda, known as "the disinherited", moved to France, the country of his grandmother, where his second cousin Charles IV of France made him baron de Lunel and his son and namesake was born. Alfonso of Spain became archdeacon of Paris in 1322, baron of Lunel in 1324 and lord of Tafalla & Caparroso in 1325. He died in 1327, at the age of 38.

== Family ==
Alfonso of Spain married Isabelle d'Antoing, Viscountess Ghent, the daughter of Hugh IV, Lord of Antoing, and Mary, Viscountess Ghent. He was the father of:

- Charles de la Cerda 1327–1354, Count of Angoulême and Constable of France.

== Sources ==
- Europaische Stammtafeln, Vol.3.
