= 1220 =

1220 in various calendars
- Gregorian calendar: 1220; MCCXX
- Ab urbe condita: 1973
- Armenian calendar: 669; ԹՎ ՈԿԹ
- Assyrian calendar: 5970
- Balinese saka calendar: 1141–1142
- Bengali calendar: 626–627
- Berber calendar: 2170
- English Regnal year: 4 Hen. 3 – 5 Hen. 3
- Buddhist calendar: 1764
- Burmese calendar: 582
- Byzantine calendar: 6728–6729
- Chinese calendar: 己卯年 (Earth Rabbit); 3917 or 3710 — to — 庚辰年 (Metal Dragon); 3918 or 3711
- Coptic calendar: 936–937
- Discordian calendar: 2386
- Ethiopian calendar: 1212–1213
- Hebrew calendar: 4980–4981
- Hindu calendars
- Vikram Samvat: 1276–1277
- Shaka Samvat: 1141–1142
- Kali Yuga: 4320–4321
- Holocene calendar: 11220
- Igbo calendar: 220–221
- Iranian calendar: 598–599
- Islamic calendar: 616–617
- Japanese calendar: Jōkyū 2 (承久２年)
- Javanese calendar: 1128–1129
- Julian calendar: 1220; MCCXX
- Korean calendar: 3553
- Minguo calendar: 692 before ROC 民前692年
- Nanakshahi calendar: −248
- Thai solar calendar: 1762–1763
- Tibetan calendar: ས་མོ་ཡོས་ལོ་ (female Earth-Hare); 1346 or 965 or 193 — to — ལྕགས་ཕོ་འབྲུག་ལོ་ (male Iron-Dragon); 1347 or 966 or 194

Conquests of Genghis Khan and his sons during his reign (r. 1206–1227)

Year 1220 (MCCXX) was a leap year starting on Wednesday of the Julian calendar.

== Events ==
=== By place ===
==== Fifth Crusade ====
- July – The Crusaders, led by the Knights Hospitaller, raid Burlus, located in the Nile Delta in Egypt. The town is pillaged, but the knights are ambushed on their return, and several Hospitallers, including Grand Master Guérin de Montaigu, are captured. Meanwhile, Sultan Al-Kamil sends an Egyptian squadron down the Rosetta branch of the Nile. It sails to Cyprus, where it finds a Crusader fleet lying off Limassol. During the attack, they sink and capture all the ships, taking many thousands of prisoners.
- Summer – The Crusader army is trapped by a Nile flood at Damietta. Cardinal Pelagius sends a Venetian squadron to intercept the Egyptian fleet, and attacks the harbours of Rosetta and Alexandria, but to no effect. Lack of money prevents Pelagius from building a sufficient number of ships, and the papal treasury can not spare him anymore. In September more of the Crusaders return home.

==== Mongol Empire ====
- Spring – The Mongol army (some 100,000 men) led by Genghis Khan crosses the Kyzylkum Desert – a freezing sand-and-tussock wilderness of some 450 kilometers – towards Bukhara. Meanwhile, Muhammad II, ruler of the Khwarazmian Empire, prepares a strong defense around his capital Samarkand. In February, Genghis approaches Bukhara, which is defended by a garrison of some 20,000 men, and begins the Siege of Bukhara. The city leaders open the gates to the Mongols, but Turkish forces who defend the city's citadel hold out for another twelve days. In a speech at the city's Friday Mosque, Genghis declares "I am the punishment of God."
- March – Mongol forces led by Genghis Khan besiege Samarkand, the city is defended by some 40,000 men, including a brigade of 20 war elephants. On the third day, the garrison launches a counter-attack, the defenders sent out their elephants, which panic, turn and trample their own men before escaping onto the open plain. Muhammad II attempts to relieve Samarkand twice but is driven back. After a week, the remainder of the garrison surrenders. The city's inhabitants, numbering some 100,000 are enslaved or slaughtered.
- Summer – Muhammad II flees westwards across northern Iran, hoping to find safety in the rugged and isolated region of Mazandaran on the southern coast of the Caspian Sea. He is pursued by 20,000 Mongol forces led by Subutai and Jebe (the Arrow). Abandoned by the remnants of his panic-stricken troops, Muhammad seeks shelter on a small island near Astara. There he dies of pleurisy some weeks later. He is succeeded by his son Jalal al-Din Mangburni, who is forced to flee to India after the Mongol invasion (see 1219).
- Autumn – Genghis Khan moves against the wealthy city of Urgench. He is joined by his eldest son Jochi, now conqueror of half a dozen lesser towns who attacks it from the north. Despite a stout defense, the city is taken after a 5-months siege. The Mongols have to fight for Urgench street by street, razing many houses. Jochi is given the right to loot the city for himself, but prefers to negotiate with the locals to avoid property damage. This is refused by Genghis, who removes Jochi from command and appoints Ögedei instead.
- November – Genghis Khan dispatches his youngest son Tolui, at the head of an army (around 50,000 men), into the Khwarazmian province of Khorasan. His forces also include 300 catapults, 700 mangonels to discharge pots filled with naphtha, 4,000 storming-ladders, and 2,500 sacks of earth for filling up moats. Among the first cities to fall is Termez (captured after a two-day siege) and later Balkh.

==== United Kingdom ====
- Spring – King Henry III makes large alterations to the Tower of London including new curtain walls, an improved water-filled ditch, and a water gate, so that he can enter the castle directly from the Thames.
- May 17 – The 12-year-old Henry III is crowned at Westminster Abbey. He is reminded of his duties as king to maintain peace, defend the rights of the English crown, and the barons swear an oath of fealty.
- Llywelyn the Great, Welsh prince of Gwynedd, begins raiding Pembrokeshire to retake land that he accuses William Marshal (the Younger) of stealing. This also includes Wiston Castle.

==== Europe ====
- April 26 – King Frederick II confirms rights of independence to the German bishops (the Confoederatio cum principibus ecclesiasticis) in an attempt to secure the election of his 9-year-old son, Henry VII as King of Germany.
- August 8 – Battle of Lihula: Estonian forces encircle the Lihula stronghold, occupied by an invading Swedish Crusader army. The Swedish troops along with Karl the Deaf try to make their way out, but they are killed.
- November 22 – Frederick II is crowned Holy Roman Emperor at Rome by Pope Honorius III. He makes Sicily an absolute monarchy and adopts Palermo as its principal seat.
- Dordrecht is granted city rights by William I, Count of Holland, making it the oldest city in present-day Netherlands.
- Polish forces under Konrad I drive out the heathen Prussians, from the Masovian territory of Chełmno Land.

==== Levant ====
- Summer – Raymond-Roupen, prince of Antioch, invades Armenian Cilicia, together with his mother, Alice, and establishes himself at Tarsus. There he waits for help from the Knights Hospitaller. Constantine of Baberon, a powerful Armenian nobleman and regent for Queen Isabella, marches with his forces to the Tarsus stronghold.

=== By topic ===
==== Religion ====
- Gothic architecture becomes increasingly popular in Europe:
  - The rebuilding of Cathedral of Chartres, which had been destroyed by a fire in 1194, is completed.
  - Early part of Toulouse Cathedral is completed.
  - The rebuilding of Amiens Cathedral begins.
  - The rebuilding of Oxford Cathedral begins.
  - The building of Salisbury Cathedral begins.
  - The rebuilding of York Minster begins.

==== Education ====
- In France the medical school of the University of Montpellier is granted its first statutes by the German cardinal-bishop Conrad of Urach.

== Births ==
- March 7 – Giacomo Bianconi, Italian priest (d. 1301)
- April 1 – Go-Saga, Japanese emperor (d. 1272)
- April 16 – Ambrose of Sienna, Italian missionary (d. 1287)
- November 11 – Alphonse II, count of Poitiers (d. 1271)
- Adolf VII, German nobleman and knight (d. 1259)
- Bertold of Regensburg, German preacher (d. 1272)
- Bonagiunta Orbicciani, Italian judge and poet (d. 1290)
- Brunetto Latini, Italian notary and philosopher (d. 1294)
- Campanus of Novara, Italian astronomer (d. 1296)
- Elisenda de Sant Climent, Catalan slave (d. 1275)
- Frederick III, burgrave of Nuremberg (d. 1297)
- Gerard of Abbeville, French theologian (d. 1272)
- Guido Guerra V, Italian knight and politician (d. 1272)
- Hillel ben Samuel, Italian philosopher (d. 1295)
- Hugh III, French nobleman and knight (d. 1266)
- James Audley, English chief governor (d. 1272)
- Joan, French noblewoman and co-ruler (d. 1271)
- Joan of Dammartin, French noblewoman (d. 1279)
- Margaret of Bar, countess of Luxembourg (d. 1275)
- Mieszko II (the Fat), duke of Kalisz-Wieluń (d. 1246)
- Mohammad Rohani, Afghan religious leader (d. 1305)
- Robert de Vere, English nobleman and knight (d. 1296)
- Roger Bacon, English philosopher and writer (d. 1292)
- Tanhum of Jerusalem, Israeli lexicographer (d. 1291)
- Walram II, German nobleman and knight (d. 1276)
- Walter Branscombe, bishop of Exeter (d. 1280)

== Deaths ==
- January 23 – Bogislaw II, duke of Pomerania (b. 1177)
- February 17 – Theobald I, German nobleman (b. 1191)
- February 25 – Albert II, margrave of Brandenburg (b. 1177)
- March 11 – Isabel de Clare, English noblewoman (b. 1172)
- April 15 – Adolf of Altena, archbishop of Cologne (b. 1157)
- May 5 – Angelus of Jerusalem, Jerusalemite priest (b.1185)
- May 8 – Rikissa of Denmark, queen of Sweden (b. 1180)
- June 1 – Henry de Bohun, 1st Earl of Hereford (b. 1176)
- August 8 – Karl the Deaf, Swedish nobleman
- November 2 – Radulf II, Scottish monk and abbot
- November 3
  - Adelaide II, German noblewoman and abbess
  - Urraca of Castile, queen of Portugal (b. 1186)
- Agnes of France (or Anna), Byzantine empress (b. 1171)
- Alys of France (or Alice), daughter of Louis VII (b. 1160)
- Attar of Nishapur, Persian poet and theoretician (b. 1145)
- Hugues IV de Berzé, French knight and poet (b. 1155)
- Ibn al-Tuwayr, Egyptian official and historian (b. 1130)
- Jean de Gisors, Norman nobleman and knight (b. 1133)
- Michael Choniates, Byzantine cleric and writer (b. 1140)
- Muhammad II, Khwarezmid viceroy and ruler (b. 1169)
- Philip of Oldcoates, English nobleman and official
- Ralph of Saint Omer (or Tiberias), prince of Galilee
- Robert de Berkeley, English nobleman and knight
- Robert of Burgate, English landowner and knight
- Stephanie of Armenia (or Rita), Armenian princess
- Veera Ballala II, Indian ruler of the Hoysala Empire
- Zhao Xun, Chinese prince and calligrapher (b. 1192)
