= Perlak, Aceh =

Town in East Aceh Regency, Aceh province, Indonesia

Coordinates: 4°09′30″N 96°58′37″E

Perlak or Peureulak is a town in East Aceh Regency, Aceh province, Indonesia.
