= 1294 =

1294 in various calendars
- Gregorian calendar: 1294; MCCXCIV
- Ab urbe condita: 2047
- Armenian calendar: 743; ԹՎ ՉԽԳ
- Assyrian calendar: 6044
- Balinese saka calendar: 1215–1216
- Bengali calendar: 700–701
- Berber calendar: 2244
- English Regnal year: 22 Edw. 1 – 23 Edw. 1
- Buddhist calendar: 1838
- Burmese calendar: 656
- Byzantine calendar: 6802–6803
- Chinese calendar: 癸巳年 (Water Snake); 3991 or 3784 — to — 甲午年 (Wood Horse); 3992 or 3785
- Coptic calendar: 1010–1011
- Discordian calendar: 2460
- Ethiopian calendar: 1286–1287
- Hebrew calendar: 5054–5055
- Hindu calendars
- Vikram Samvat: 1350–1351
- Shaka Samvat: 1215–1216
- Kali Yuga: 4394–4395
- Holocene calendar: 11294
- Igbo calendar: 294–295
- Iranian calendar: 672–673
- Islamic calendar: 693–694
- Japanese calendar: Einin 2 (永仁２年)
- Javanese calendar: 1204–1206
- Julian calendar: 1294; MCCXCIV
- Korean calendar: 3627
- Minguo calendar: 618 before ROC 民前618年
- Nanakshahi calendar: −174
- Thai solar calendar: 1836–1837
- Tibetan calendar: ཆུ་མོ་སྦྲུལ་ལོ་ (female Water-Snake); 1420 or 1039 or 267 — to — ཤིང་ཕོ་རྟ་ལོ་ (male Wood-Horse); 1421 or 1040 or 268

Year 1294 (MCCXCIV) was a common year starting on Friday of the Julian calendar.

== Events ==
=== Asia ===
- February 18 – Kublai Khan dies; by this time the separation of the four khanates of the Mongol Empire (the Chagatai Khanate in Central Asia, the Golden Horde in Russia, the Ilkhanate in Persia, and the Yuan Dynasty in China) has deepened.

=== Europe ===
- March 30 – Third Swedish Crusade: a Novgorodian army led by Prince Roman Glebovich attempts a storm of Vyborg, but the attack fails.
- Spring – Following the arrival of a fleet from Sweden, an offensive takes place in which Sweden captures Kexholm after an assault.
- July 5 – Following the Papal election, 1292–94, Pope Celestine V succeeds Nicholas IV, becoming the 192nd pope.
- Autumn – In response to the actions of new royal administrators in north and west Wales, Madog ap Llywelyn leads a revolt against his English overlords.
- December 24 – Pope Boniface VIII succeeds Pope Celestine V, becoming the 193rd pope, after Celestine V abdicates the papacy on December 13, only five months after reluctantly accepting his surprise election on July 5, wishing to return to his life as an ascetic hermit.
- John Balliol, King of Scotland, decides to refuse English King Edward I's demands for support in a planned invasion of France, the result being the negotiation of the Auld Alliance with France and Norway in the following year. These actions play a part in precipitating the Scottish Wars of Independence, which begin in 1296.
- Strata Florida Abbey is rebuilt; it had been destroyed some years earlier, during King Edward I's conquest of Wales.
- Architect Arnolfo di Cambio designs Florence Cathedral (Cattedrale di Santa Maria del Fiore, better known simply as Il Duomo); he also begins work on the Basilica of Santa Croce, Florence.
- England and Portugal enter into the first iteration of the Anglo-Portuguese Alliance, the oldest alliance in the world still in force.
- Edward I of England and Philip the Fair of France declare war on each other. To finance this war, both kings lay taxes on the clergy. Pope Boniface VIII insists that kings gain papal consent for taxation of the clergy, and forbids churchmen to pay taxes.

== Births ==
- June 18 or June 19 – Charles IV of France (d. 1328)
- John, Duke of Durazzo (d. 1336)
- date unknown – Kusunoki Masashige, Japanese samurai (d. 1336)
  - Joan of Valois, Countess of Hainaut (d. 1342)

== Deaths ==
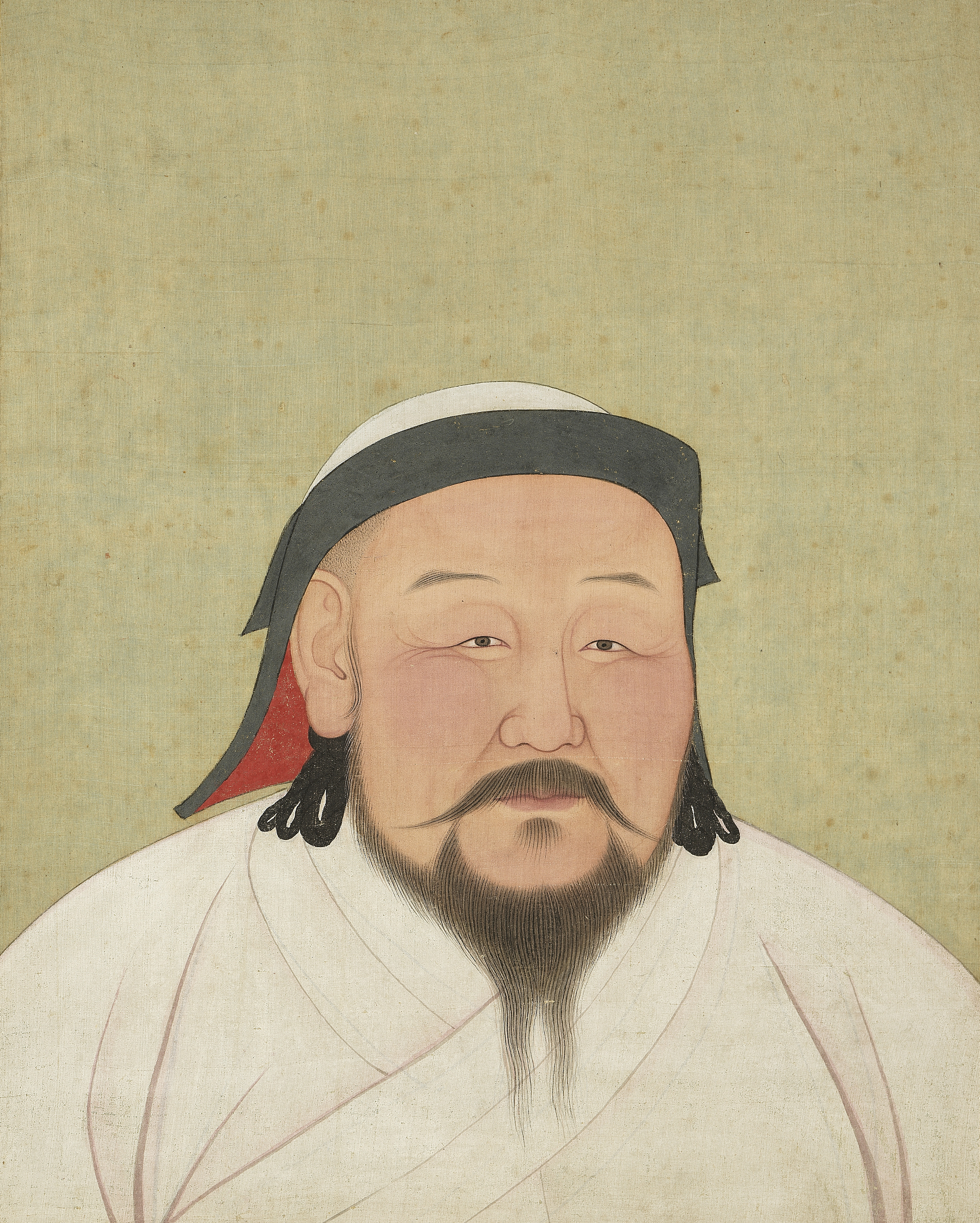
Kublai Khan

- February 18 – Kublai Khan of the Mongol Empire (b. 1215)
- May 3 – John I of Brabant
- June 12 – John I of Brienne, Count of Eu
- December 25 – Mestwin II, Duke of Pomerania
- date unknown
  - Emperor Yagbe'u Seyon of Ethiopia
  - Brunetto Latini, Florentine philosopher (b. c. 1220)
  - Dmitri of Pereslavl, Grand Duke of Vladimir-Suzdal
