= 1301 =

1301 in various calendars
- Gregorian calendar: 1301; MCCCI
- Ab urbe condita: 2054
- Armenian calendar: 750; ԹՎ ՉԾ
- Assyrian calendar: 6051
- Balinese saka calendar: 1222–1223
- Bengali calendar: 707–708
- Berber calendar: 2251
- English Regnal year: 29 Edw. 1 – 30 Edw. 1
- Buddhist calendar: 1845
- Burmese calendar: 663
- Byzantine calendar: 6809–6810
- Chinese calendar: 庚子年 (Metal Rat); 3998 or 3791 — to — 辛丑年 (Metal Ox); 3999 or 3792
- Coptic calendar: 1017–1018
- Discordian calendar: 2467
- Ethiopian calendar: 1293–1294
- Hebrew calendar: 5061–5062
- Hindu calendars
- Vikram Samvat: 1357–1358
- Shaka Samvat: 1222–1223
- Kali Yuga: 4401–4402
- Holocene calendar: 11301
- Igbo calendar: 301–302
- Iranian calendar: 679–680
- Islamic calendar: 700–701
- Japanese calendar: Shōan 3 (正安３年)
- Javanese calendar: 1212–1213
- Julian calendar: 1301; MCCCI
- Korean calendar: 3634
- Minguo calendar: 611 before ROC 民前611年
- Nanakshahi calendar: −167
- Thai solar calendar: 1843–1844
- Tibetan calendar: ལྕགས་ཕོ་བྱི་བ་ལོ་ (male Iron-Rat); 1427 or 1046 or 274 — to — ལྕགས་མོ་གླང་ལོ་ (female Iron-Ox); 1428 or 1047 or 275

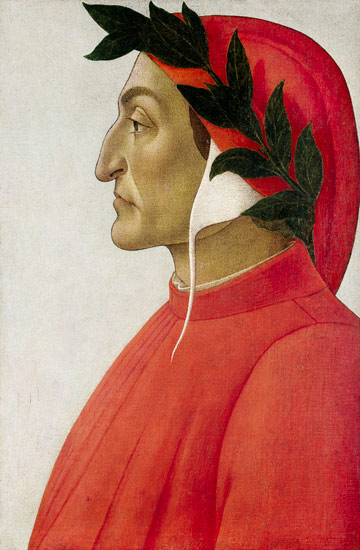
Dante Alighieri (c. 1265–1321)

Year 1301 (MCCCI) was a common year starting on Sunday of the Julian calendar.

== Events ==
=== January– March ===
- January 14 – With the death of King Andrew III ("the Venetian") after a short illness, possibly from poisoning, the Árpád Dynasty in Hungary ends. This results in a power struggle between Wenceslaus III of Bohemia, Otto III of Bavaria, and Charles Robert of Naples. Eventually, Wenceslaus is elected and crowned as king of Hungary and Croatia. His rule is only nominal, because a dozen powerful Hungarian nobles hold sway over large territories in the kingdom.
- January 25 – Second Mongol invasion of Burma: The forces of Temür Khan, Mongol leader who also serves as the Emperor Chengzong of China, reach Myinsaing, capital of the Myinsaing Kingdom in central Burma, and begin a siege of the city that will last for almost three months before the invasion leaders are paid to leave.
- February 7 – The 16-year-old Prince Edward of Caernarfon, son and heir of King Edward I ("Edward Longshanks"), becomes the first English Prince of Wales and is also granted the royal lands in Wales.
- February 28 – Second Mongol invasion of Burma: Five weeks after beginning the siege of Myinsaing with no success, the Mongol invaders launch a major assault, but the Burmese defenders continue their defense for 12 days, leading to a truce.
- March 2 – (Shōan 3, 21st day of the 1st month) Emperor Go-Fushimi abdicates the throne after a 2½-year reign. He is succeeded by his 15-year-old cousin, Go-Nijō, as the 94th emperor of Japan. Go-Nijō will reign until 1308.
- March 12 – Second Mongol invasion of Burma: After seven weeks of a stalemate, the Mongols and the Burmese begin negotiations for a truce.

=== April– June ===
- April 8 – Second Mongol invasion of Burma: The three Bagan brothers (Athinkhaya, Yazathingyan and Thihathu) who rule the Burmese Kingdom of Myinsaing reach an agreement for Mongol leader Temür Khan and his officers to be paid 800 taels (30 kg) of gold and 2200 taels (83 kg) of silver in return for ending the invasion and returning to Mongolia.
- April 10 – In the Principality of Monaco, the first Grimaldi family ruler, Rainier I, is forced to flee as troops from the Republic of Genoa besiege the Monacans. The Genoese rule will last for more than 30 years, until September 12, 1331.
- May 13 – After an attempt in the spring to have Prince Charles of Anjou succeed the late Andrew III as King of Hungary, the Diet of Hungary votes to declare his coronation invalid, in that Charles was not proclaimed king at Székesfehérvár and never received the Crown of Saint Stephen.
- June 22 – Nicola Boccasini, who will become Pope Benedict XI in 1303, begins his duties as the Roman Catholic apostolic legate to Hungary, having been appointed as the personal representative of Pope Boniface VIII.

=== July– September ===
- July 5 – First War of Scottish Independence: King Edward I of England launches his sixth campaign into Scotland, crossing into Berwickshire from Northumberland.
- July 10 – Indian forces under Sultan Alauddin Khalji capture Ranthambore Fortress. During the siege, General Nusrat Khan Jalesari is hit and killed by a manjaniq stone.
- August 5 – The English Army, commanded by King Edward I, reaches Glasgow.
- August 27 – Wenceslaus III of Bohemia is crowned as King of Hungary under the regnal name King Vencel, receiving the Crown of Saint Stephen in a ceremony at Székesfehérvár.
- September 2 – In their invasion of Scotland, English troops under the command of Prince Edward of Caernarfon and Henry de Lacy, Earl of Lincoln, capture Turnberry Castle in Carrick, the headquarters of the Bruces.
- September 3 – Bartolomeo I della Scala becomes the new Lord of Verona, at the time a city-state in Italy that included most of the Veneto region (with the exception of Venice), upon the death of his father Alberto.
- September 16 – In Spain, the Emirate of Granada, ruled by Muhammad al-Faqih, and the Crown of Aragon, ruled by Jaime II the Just sign a military agreement to fight against the Kingdom of Castile and to capture the port of Tarifa.

=== October– December ===
- October 5 – (Shoan, 22nd day of the 8th month) Hojo Morotoki becomes the 10th regent for the Kamakura shogunate of Japan.
- October 6 – (2 Safar 701 AH) Abu Numayy I, Arabic ruler of the Emirate of Mecca, abdicates and is succeeded by two of his sons, Rumaythah and Humaydah. Abu Numayy dies two days later at the age of 69.
- November 1 – Charles of Valois, son of the late King Philip III ("Philip the Bold"), is summoned to Italy by Pope Boniface VIII to restore peace between the Guelphs and Ghibellines. He enters Florence, and allows the Neri ("Black Guelphs") to return to the city. Charles installs a new government under Cante dei Gabrielli as Chief Magistrate (podestà), leading to the permanent exile of Dante Alighieri, Italian poet and philosopher, from the city.
- November 9 – Bolko I ("Bolko the Strict"), Polish nobleman and co-ruler dies and is succeeded by his three minor sons (Bernard, 10; Henry, 9; and Bolko II, 2), with his brother-in-law Herman, Margrave of Brandenburg-Salzwedel to serve as regent.
- December 5 – Pope Boniface VIII issues the papal bull Ausculta Fili ("Listen, my son"), accusing King Philip IV of France ("Philip the Fair") of malfeasance of office.
- December 6 – In Spain, Ferdinand IV of Castile reaches the age of 16 and is proclaimed of the age of majority to be crowned as King of Castile and as King of León. Ferdinand IV had become the nominal monarch at age 9, under the regency of his mother, María de Molina.

=== By place ===
==== Middle East ====
- Spring – Sultan Osman I calls for a military campaign to strike deep into Byzantine Bithynia. During the campaign, Ottoman forces capture the towns of İnegöl and Yenişehir. The later town will be transformed into a capital city, as Osman moves his administration and personal household within its walls. By the end of the year, Ottoman forces begin blockading the major Byzantine city of Nicaea.

== Births ==
- February 6 – Henry Percy, English nobleman, governor and knight (d. 1352)
- June 19 – Morikuni, Japanese prince, shogun and puppet ruler (d. 1333)
- July 23 – Otto I ("Otto the Merry"), Austrian nobleman and co-ruler (d. 1339)
- August 5 – Edmund of Woodstock, English nobleman and prince (d. 1330)
- September 24 – Ralph de Stafford, English nobleman and knight (d. 1372)
- October 4 – Thomas de Monthermer, English nobleman and knight (d. 1340)
- October 7 – Aleksandr Mikhailovich, Russian Grand Prince (d. 1339)
- unknown dates
  - Ingeborg of Norway, Norwegian princess and de facto ruler (d. 1361)
  - Nitta Yoshisada, Japanese nobleman, general and samurai (d. 1338)
  - Ni Zan, Chinese nobleman, painter, musician and tea master (d. 1374)
  - Rudolf II, German nobleman and knight (House of Zähringen) (d. 1352)

== Deaths ==
- January 14 – Andrew III ("Andrew the Venetian"), king of Hungary (b. 1265)
- February 19 – Pietro Gerra, Italian cleric, archbishop and patriarch
- February 20 – Asukai Gayū, Japanese nobleman and poet (b. 1241)
- March 21 – Guillaume de Champvent, Swiss nobleman and bishop
- May 7 – Hōjō Akitoki, Japanese military leader and poet (b. 1248)
- August 22 – Giacomo Bianconi, Italian priest and scholar (b. 1220)
- September 3 – Alberto I, Italian nobleman and Chief magistrate
- November 19 – Johann III, Polish chaplain, bishop and diplomat
- unknown dates
  - Blasco I d'Alagona ("Blasc the Elder"), Aragonese nobleman and captain
  - "False Margaret", Norwegian noblewoman and pretender (b. 1260)
