= 1289 =

1289 in various calendars
- Gregorian calendar: 1289; MCCLXXXIX
- Ab urbe condita: 2042
- Armenian calendar: 738; ԹՎ ՉԼԸ
- Assyrian calendar: 6039
- Balinese saka calendar: 1210–1211
- Bengali calendar: 695–696
- Berber calendar: 2239
- English Regnal year: 17 Edw. 1 – 18 Edw. 1
- Buddhist calendar: 1833
- Burmese calendar: 651
- Byzantine calendar: 6797–6798
- Chinese calendar: 戊子年 (Earth Rat); 3986 or 3779 — to — 己丑年 (Earth Ox); 3987 or 3780
- Coptic calendar: 1005–1006
- Discordian calendar: 2455
- Ethiopian calendar: 1281–1282
- Hebrew calendar: 5049–5050
- Hindu calendars
- Vikram Samvat: 1345–1346
- Shaka Samvat: 1210–1211
- Kali Yuga: 4389–4390
- Holocene calendar: 11289
- Igbo calendar: 289–290
- Iranian calendar: 667–668
- Islamic calendar: 687–688
- Japanese calendar: Shōō 2 (正応２年)
- Javanese calendar: 1199–1200
- Julian calendar: 1289; MCCLXXXIX
- Korean calendar: 3622
- Minguo calendar: 623 before ROC 民前623年
- Nanakshahi calendar: −179
- Thai solar calendar: 1831–1832
- Tibetan calendar: ས་ཕོ་བྱི་བ་ལོ་ (male Earth-Rat); 1415 or 1034 or 262 — to — ས་མོ་གླང་ལོ་ (female Earth-Ox); 1416 or 1035 or 263

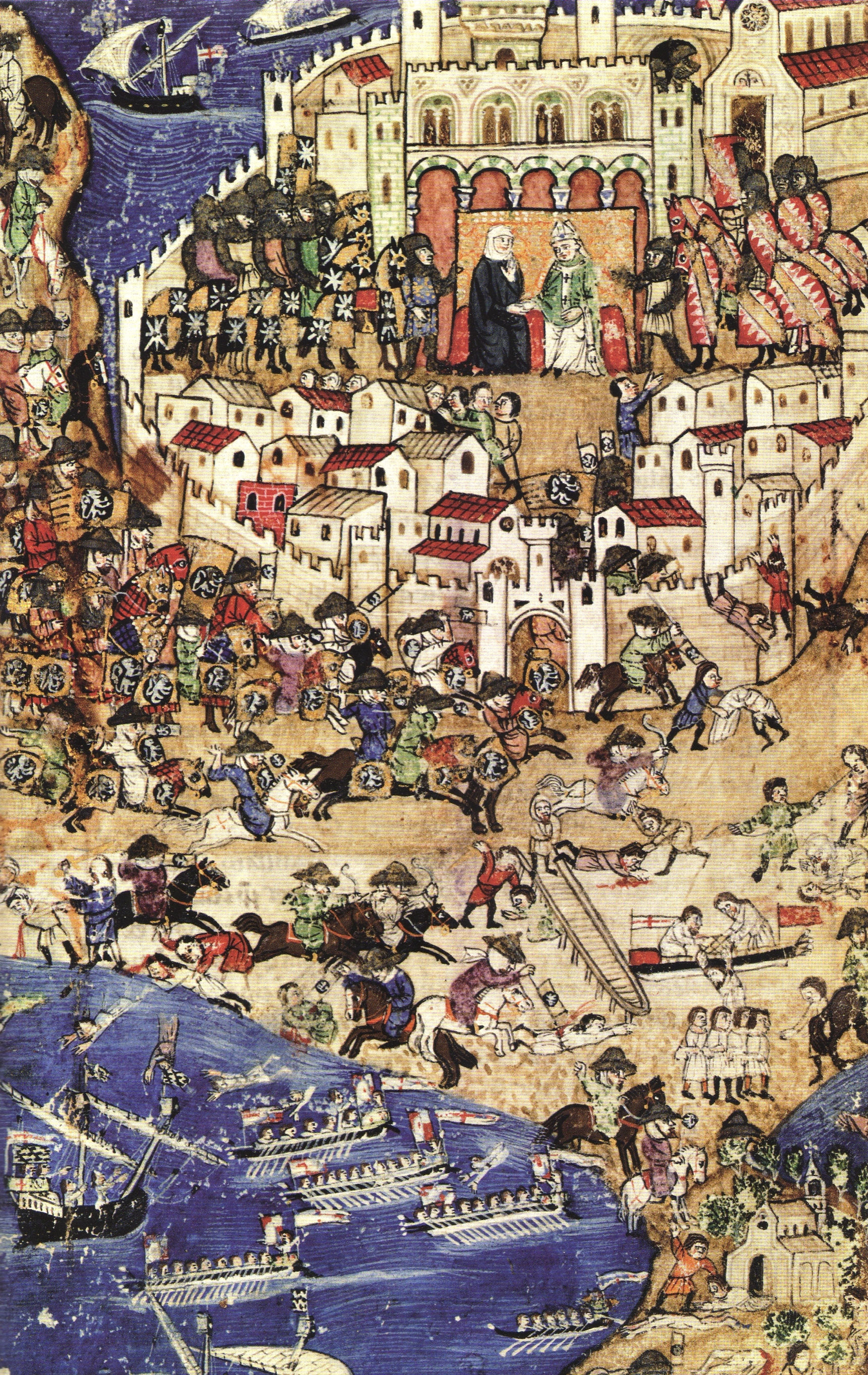
The Siege of Tripoli by the Mamluks.

Year 1289 (MCCLXXXIX) was a common year starting on Saturday of the Julian calendar.

== Events ==
=== By place ===
==== Europe ====
- June 11 – Battle of Campaldino: Pro-papal Guelph forces of Florence and their allies, Lucca, Pistoia, Prato and Siena under Viscount Aimery IV defeat the Ghibelline army of Arezzo (some 10,000 men) in Tuscany. Florence becomes the dominant power in Central Italy; powerful merchant guilds take on a more political role in the communal government against their rivals of Genoa, Pisa and Venice.
- July 7 – Battle of Copenhagen: A Norwegian expeditionary force under King Eric II, supported by Danish outlaws, sets sail to Copenhagen and attacks the city. But they are repelled and forced to withdraw to Zealand.

==== Britain ====
- Summer – King Edward I (Longshanks) proposes a marriage between his infant son, Edward of Caernarfon, and the 6-year-old Margaret (Maid of Norway).
- Construction of Conwy Castle in Wales, ordered by Edward I (Longshanks), is completed.

==== Levant ====
- February 9 – Sultan Qalawun (the Victorious) marches the Mamluk army out of Cairo, leaving his son Al-Ashraf Khalil commanding Cairo's Citadel, supported by Viceroy Baydara al-Mansuri. The army moves via Salihiya, across Sinai and through Jordan to Damascus. He orders the regional governors of Syria to mobilize in Damascus, where many infantry volunteers have assembled.
- March – The 19-year-old King Henry II sends his younger brother Almalric, with a company of knights and 4 galleys to Tripoli (modern Lebanon). Meanwhile, many non-combatant citizens flee to Cyprus. The Mamluk army arrives before Tripoli and begins the attack with siege engines, while building buches (wooden defensive structures) outside the city on March 25.
- April 26 – Siege of Tripoli: Mamluk forces under Qalawun (the Victorious) capture Tripoli after a month-long siege, thus extinguishing the County of Tripoli. Qalawun orders the city to be razed to the ground, a widespread massacre kills every man found by the Mamluks, while the women and children are taken as slaves.
- July–August – Admiral Benedetto Zaccaria, having escaped from Tripoli, starts a naval campaign against Mamluk shipping and raids Tinnis in Egypt. In response, Qalawun closes Alexandria to Genoese merchants.

=== By topic ===
==== Education ====
- Pope Nicholas IV formally constitutes the University of Montpellier in France by papal bull, combining various existing schools under the mantle of a single university.

==== Markets ====
- In Siena, twenty-three partners, including five members of the Bonsignori family, re-create the Gran Tavola, formerly the most successful European bank, which had ceased its operations after the death of its creator and manager, Orlando Bonsignori, in 1273.

== Births ==
- May 24 – Afonso Sanches, Portuguese nobleman and knight (d. 1329)
- October 4 – Louis X (the Quarrelsome), king of France (d. 1316)
- October 6 – Wenceslaus III, king of Hungary and Croatia (d. 1306)
- Alfonso de la Cerda, Spanish nobleman and archdeacon (d. 1327)
- Alice Comyn, Scottish noblewoman (House of Brienne) (d. 1349)
- Donnchadh IV, Scottish nobleman, magnate and knight (d. 1353)
- Eleanor of Anjou, queen consort of Sicily (House of Anjou) (d. 1341)
- Frederick the Fair (or the Handsome), king of Germany (d. 1330)
- Joan of Artois, French noblewoman and ruler (suo jure) (d. 1350)
- Ton'a (or Tonna), Japanese Buddhist poet and writer (d. 1372)
- William de Shareshull, English lawyer and chief justice (d. 1370)

== Deaths ==
- January 16 – Buqa (or Bugha), Mongol nobleman and chancellor
- February 26 – Przemko of Ścinawa, Polish nobleman and knight
- March 10 – Maud de Lacy (or Matilda), English noblewoman (b. 1223)
- March 12 – Demetrius II (the Devoted), king of Georgia (b. 1259)
- March 19 – John of Parma, Italian priest and theologian (b. 1209)
- April 19 – Conrad of Ascoli, Italian monk and missionary (b. 1234)
- May 24 – Frederick V, German nobleman (House of Hohenzollern)
- May 27 – John III, German nobleman and co-ruler of Mecklenburg
- June 11 – Bonconte da Montefeltro, Italian nobleman
- August 24 – Patrick III, Scottish nobleman and regent (b. 1213)
- Alexander Comyn, Scoto-Norman nobleman, magnate and knight
- Bentivenga da Bentivengi, Italian monk, cleric and cardinal-bishop
- Catherine Birgersdotter, Swedish noblewoman (House of Bjälbo)
- David Mac Cerbaill (or MacCarwell), Irish monk and archbishop
- Diego López IV, Spanish nobleman and knight (House of Haro)
- Eudes de Montreuil, French master builder, sculptor and engineer
- Fakhr al-Din Iraqi (or Araqi), Persian poet, philosopher and writer
- Gruffydd Fychan I, English nobleman and prince of Powys Fadog
- Guy III, French nobleman, knight and regent (House of Châtillon)
- Il-yeon, Korean Buddhist monk, historian and calligrapher (b. 1206)
- Ippen (or Zuien), Japanese Buddhist monk and preacher (b. 1234)
- Petrus de Dacia, Swedish monk, hagiographer and writer (b. 1235)
- Ugolino della Gherardesca, Italian nobleman, politician and admiral
