= Lexikon des Mittelalters =

German encyclopedia on the history of the Middle Ages

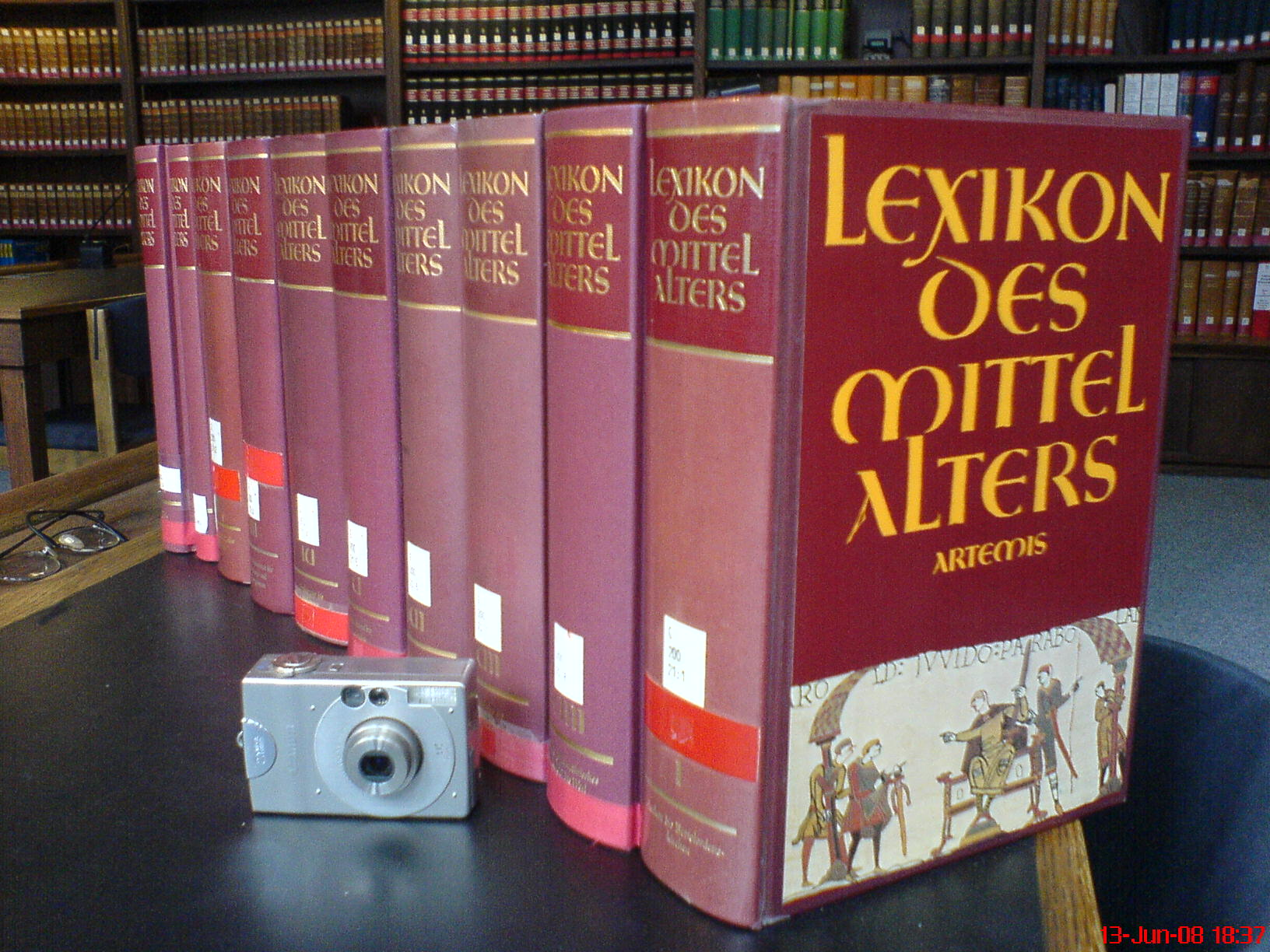
Lexikon des Mittelalters

The Lexikon des Mittelalters (lit. 'Lexicon of the Middle Ages'; LMA or LexMA) is a German encyclopedia on the history and culture of the Middle Ages. Written by authors from all over the world, it comprises more than 36,000 articles in 9 volumes. Historically the works range from Late Antiquity to about 1500, covering the Byzantine Empire and the Arab world .

The first six volumes were published by Artemis Publishing, Munich and Zürich; volumes seven through nine by LexMA, Munich. In 2000, an electronic (standalone) edition of the Lexikon was published on CD-ROM by Brepols.

== Reception ==
The first volume was widely praised upon publication; G.A. Holmes, in The English Historical Review, foresaw that the entire encyclopedia would be "a valuable reference work of a kind which medievalists hitherto lacked." H. Chadwick, in The Journal of Theological Studies, called the lexicon "a necessary and valuable work of reference." Its coverage of subjects related to Islam was praised, though the same reviewer called the coverage of topics related to Judaism "comparatively modest."

The CD-ROM edition was chosen as one of the "Selected Reference Books of 2001-2002" by College & Research Libraries.

== Editions ==
- Lexikon des Mittelalters. 10 vols. Munich: Artemis, 1980–1999. ISBN 3-423-59057-2. Full edition, vol. 10 contains indices. Vols. 7–9 published by LexMA.
- Lexikon des Mittelalters. Stuttgart: Metzler, 1999. ISBN 3-476-01742-7. Abridged "study" or "pocket" edition, no separate index volume. Reprinted by Deutschen Taschenbuch, 2003.
- Lexikon des Mittelalters Online. Turnhout: Brepols, 2009. ISBN 978-2-503-52415-3.

== See also ==
- Dictionary of the Middle Ages
- List of encyclopedias by branch of knowledge
