= 1291 =

1291 in various calendars
- Gregorian calendar: 1291; MCCXCI
- Ab urbe condita: 2044
- Armenian calendar: 740; ԹՎ ՉԽ
- Assyrian calendar: 6041
- Balinese saka calendar: 1212–1213
- Bengali calendar: 697–698
- Berber calendar: 2241
- English Regnal year: 19 Edw. 1 – 20 Edw. 1
- Buddhist calendar: 1835
- Burmese calendar: 653
- Byzantine calendar: 6799–6800
- Chinese calendar: 庚寅年 (Metal Tiger); 3988 or 3781 — to — 辛卯年 (Metal Rabbit); 3989 or 3782
- Coptic calendar: 1007–1008
- Discordian calendar: 2457
- Ethiopian calendar: 1283–1284
- Hebrew calendar: 5051–5052
- Hindu calendars
- Vikram Samvat: 1347–1348
- Shaka Samvat: 1212–1213
- Kali Yuga: 4391–4392
- Holocene calendar: 11291
- Igbo calendar: 291–292
- Iranian calendar: 669–670
- Islamic calendar: 689–691
- Japanese calendar: Shōō 4 (正応４年)
- Javanese calendar: 1201–1202
- Julian calendar: 1291; MCCXCI
- Korean calendar: 3624
- Minguo calendar: 621 before ROC 民前621年
- Nanakshahi calendar: −177
- Thai solar calendar: 1833–1834
- Tibetan calendar: ལྕགས་ཕོ་སྟག་ལོ་ (male Iron-Tiger); 1417 or 1036 or 264 — to — ལྕགས་མོ་ཡོས་ལོ་ (female Iron-Hare); 1418 or 1037 or 265

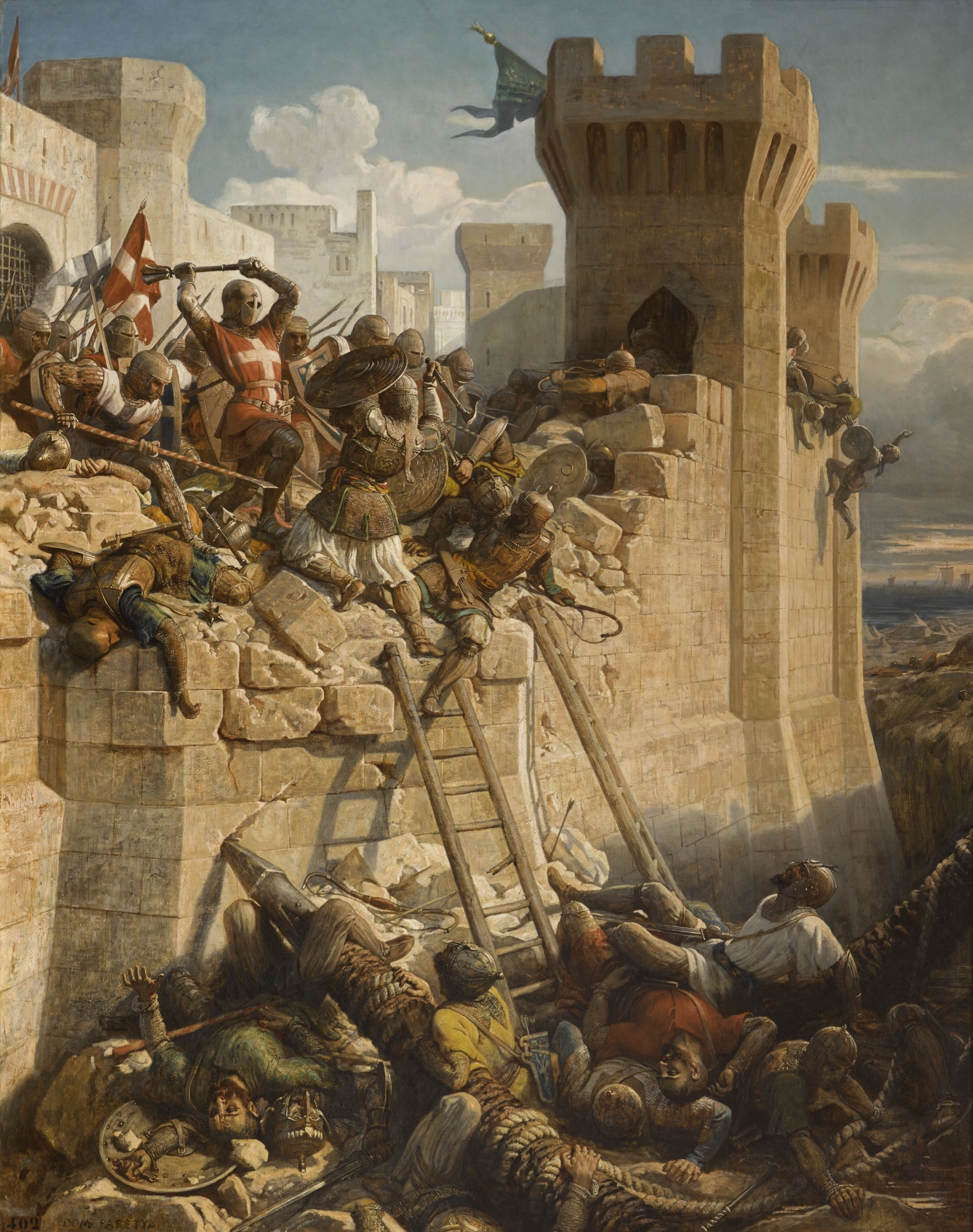
Marshal Matthew of Clermont defends the walls at the Siege of Acre (1840)

Map of Acre (1291) during the siege of the Mamluk campaign (4 April–18 May)

Year 1291 (MCCXCI) was a common year starting on Monday of the Julian calendar.

== Events ==
=== By place ===
==== Europe ====
- August 1 – Federal Charter of 1291: The "three forest cantons" (Waldstätte) of Switzerland (Schwyz, Uri and Unterwalden) form a defensive alliance to protect themselves from the House of Habsburg; this is a starting point for growth of the Old Swiss Confederacy. This year is also the traditional date of the Rütli Oath (Rütlischwur), the swearing of an oath by the three cantonal representatives at Rütli meadow.
- August 6 – A combined Genoese-Sevillian fleet led by Admiral Benedetto Zaccaria wins a victory over 27 Marinid galleys at Alcácer Seguir –12 galleys are taken and the rest put to flight. The following day, Benedetto drags the captured vessels along the coast in view of Abu Yaqub Yusuf an-Nasr, Marinid ruler of Morocco, who, "defeated and dishonored", withdraws his fleet to Fez.
- Late September – Abu Yaqub Yusuf an-Nasr crosses the Strait of Gibraltar from Alcácer Seguir to Tarifa. During the next three months, Marinid forces besiege Vejer de la Frontera, and carry out daily raids around Ferez. In the meantime, other Marinid raiding parties devastate the countryside as far north as Alcalá del Río, near Seville.
- November–December – The kings Sancho IV of Castile ("the Brave") and James II of Aragon ("the Just") agree to join the war against the Marinids and conclude a treaty of friendship. Muhammad II, Nasrid ruler of Granada, gives his support to Sancho to take Tarifa from the Marinids. In the agreement, Castile and Aragon will respect their own boundaries.
- Pope Nicholas IV confirms the independence of San Marino by papal bull.
- Klenová Castle is constructed in southern Bohemia near the town of Klatovy (modern Czech Republic) as part of a frontier defense system.
- King Andrew III of Hungary ("the Venetian") gives royal town privileges to Bratislava, modern-day capital of Slovakia.

==== Britain ====
- Spring – Several nobles unsuccessfully claim the Scottish throne (a process known as the 'Great Cause'), including John Balliol, Robert de Brus, John Hastings and William de Vesci. Fearing civil war, the Guardians of Scotland ask King Edward I of England to arbitrate. Before agreeing, he obtains concessions to revive English overlordship over the Scots.
- May 10 – Edward I meets the claimants for the Scottish crown at Norham Castle and informs them that he will judge the various claims to the throne, but they must acknowledge him as overlord of Scotland and, to ensure peace, surrender the royal castles of the kingdom into his keeping.
- June 13 – Guardians and the Scottish nobles recognise Edward I as overlord of Scotland, agreeing that the kingdom will be handed over to him until a rightful heir has been found.

==== Levant ====
- May 18 – Siege of Acre: Mamluk forces under Sultan Al-Ashraf Khalil capture Acre after a six-week siege. The Mamluks take the outer wall of the city after fierce fighting. The Military Orders drive them back temporarily, but three days later the inner wall is breached. King Henry II of Cyprus escapes, but the bulk of the defenders and most of the citizens perish in the fighting or are sold into slavery. The surviving knights fall back to the fortified towers and resist for ten days until the Mamluks breakthrough on May 28. The fall of Acre signals the end of the Crusader Kingdom of Jerusalem. No effective Crusade is raised to recapture the Holy Land afterward.
- June – Al-Ashraf Khalil enters Damascus in triumph with Crusaders chained at their feet and the captured Crusader standards, which are carried upside-down as a sign of their defeat. Following the capture of Acre, Khalil and his Mamluk generals proceed to wrest control of the remaining Crusader-held fortresses along the Syrian coast. Within weeks, the Mamluks conquer Tyre, Sidon, Beirut, Haifa and Tartus.
- July – Thibaud Gaudin arrives with the surviving knights, with the treasure of the Order, in Sidon. There, he is elected as Grand Master of the Knights Templar, to succeed Guillaume de Beaujeu (who was mortally wounded during the siege of Acre). Shortly after, Mamluk forces attack Sidon and Gaudin (who has not had enough knights to defend) evacuates the city and moves to the Sidon Sea Castle on July 14.
- August 14 – Mamluk forces conquer the last Crusader outpost in Syria, the Templar fortress of Atlit south of Acre. All that now is left to the Knights Templar is the island fortress of Ruad. Al-Ashraf Khalil returns to Cairo in triumph as the "victor in the long struggle against the Crusader states".

==== Asia ====
- In Japan the temple of Nanzen-ji at Kyoto is established by Emperor Kameyama. This temple becomes one of the most important religious schools within the Rinzai sect of Zen Buddhism and includes multiple sub-temples.
- Guo Shoujing, Chinese engineer and astronomer, constructs the artificial Kunming Lake, which is developed into a reservoir with summer gardens for Khanbaliq (or Dadu of Yuan), Mongol capital of Emperor Kublai Khan.

=== By topic ===
==== Economy ====
- Four towns of the County of Holland (Dordrecht, Haarlem, Leiden and Alkmaar) and two of the County of Zeeland (Middelburg and Zierikzee) agree collectively to secure a loan by their sovereign, Count Floris V. This gives important securities to the lenders, and allows Floris to access the same low interest rates as the cities’ governments.
- Venetian glass manufacture is concentrated on the island of Murano (located in the Venetian Lagoon), to prevent fires in Venice itself.

==== Exploration ====
- Spring – The brothers Vandino and Ugolino Vivaldi, Italian explorers and merchants from Genoa, embark with two galleys intending to reach India and establish a trade route to Italy. They sail along the coast of present-day Morocco after passing through the Strait of Gibraltar. They may have followed the African coast as far as Cape Non before being lost at sea.

== Births ==
- February 8 – Afonso IV ("the Brave"), king of Portugal (d. 1357)
- March 9 – Cangrande I della Scala, Italian nobleman (d. 1329)
- May 10 – Gilbert de Clare, English nobleman and knight (d. 1314)
- August 12 – Ichijō Uchitsune, Japanese nobleman (kugyō) (d. 1325)
- September 23 – Bolesław III, Polish nobleman and knight (d. 1352)
- October 31 – Philippe de Vitry, French musician and poet (d. 1361)
- December 15 – Aymon ("the Peaceful"), Savoyan nobleman (d. 1343)
- December 20 – Margareta Ebner, German nun and mystic (d. 1351)
- Hugh de Audley, English nobleman, knight and diplomat (d. 1347)
- Luis de la Cerda, French nobleman, prince and admiral (d. 1348)
- Luitgard of Wittichen, German nun, abbess and mystic (d. 1348)
- Marie of Artois, French noblewoman (House of Artois) (d. 1365)
- Philip V of France (d. 1322)
- Tōin Kinkata, Japanese official, historian and writer (d. 1360)

== Deaths ==
- March 5 – Sa'd al-Dawla, Persian physician and vizier (b. 1240)
- March 10 – Arghun Khan, Mongol ruler of the Ilkhanate (b. 1258)
- March 16 – Alauddin Sabir Kaliyari, Indian Sufi preacher (b. 1196)
- May 11 – Thomas Ingoldsthorpe, English archdeacon and bishop
- May 18 – Matthew of Clermont, French nobleman and Marshal
- May 25 – Bengt Birgersson, Swedish duke and bishop (b. 1254)
- June 5 – John I, German nobleman (House of Ascania) (b. 1260)
- June 18 – Alfonso III (or II; "the Liberal"), king of Aragon (b. 1265)
- June 25 – Eleanor of Provence, queen consort of England (b. 1223)
- June 27 – Tanhum of Jerusalem, Outremer lexicographer (b. 1220)
- July – Muzaffar al-Din Hajjaj, Qutlughkhanid prince and co-ruler (b. 1247)
- July 12 – Herman VII, Margrave of Baden-Baden ("the Rouser"), German nobleman (b. 1266)
- July 15 – Rudolf I, king of Germany (House of Habsburg) (b. 1218)
- August 16 – Frederick Tuta, German nobleman and regent (b. 1269)
- October 8 – Henry I of Werle, German nobleman, prince and knight (b. 1245)
- December 11 – Francesco Lippi, Italian monk and hermit (b. 1211)
- Alfonso de Castilla y Molina, Castilian nobleman and prince (infante) (b. 1286)
- Badr al-Din Solamish, Mamluk ruler of Egypt and Syria (b. 1272)
- Guy de Montfort, English nobleman and Vicar-General (b. 1244)
- Hong Ta-gu (or Jun-gi), Korean ruler and military leader (b. 1244)
- Niall Culanach O'Neill (or Culanagh), Irish king of Tír Eoghain, killed (b. 1231)
- Nuño González II, Castilian nobleman and knight (House of Lara)
- Philip Marmion, 5th Baron Marmion of Tamworth, Norman King's Champion, High Sheriff and knight
- William de Braose, 1st Baron Braose, Norman nobleman (House of Braose) (b. 1224)
- Guillaume de Beaujeu, French nobleman and Grand Master (b. 1230)
