= 1293 =

1293 in various calendars
- Gregorian calendar: 1293; MCCXCIII
- Ab urbe condita: 2046
- Armenian calendar: 742; ԹՎ ՉԽԲ
- Assyrian calendar: 6043
- Balinese saka calendar: 1214–1215
- Bengali calendar: 699–700
- Berber calendar: 2243
- English Regnal year: 21 Edw. 1 – 22 Edw. 1
- Buddhist calendar: 1837
- Burmese calendar: 655
- Byzantine calendar: 6801–6802
- Chinese calendar: 壬辰年 (Water Dragon); 3990 or 3783 — to — 癸巳年 (Water Snake); 3991 or 3784
- Coptic calendar: 1009–1010
- Discordian calendar: 2459
- Ethiopian calendar: 1285–1286
- Hebrew calendar: 5053–5054
- Hindu calendars
- Vikram Samvat: 1349–1350
- Shaka Samvat: 1214–1215
- Kali Yuga: 4393–4394
- Holocene calendar: 11293
- Igbo calendar: 293–294
- Iranian calendar: 671–672
- Islamic calendar: 692–693
- Japanese calendar: Shōō 6 / Einin 1 (永仁元年)
- Javanese calendar: 1203–1204
- Julian calendar: 1293; MCCXCIII
- Korean calendar: 3626
- Minguo calendar: 619 before ROC 民前619年
- Nanakshahi calendar: −175
- Thai solar calendar: 1835–1836
- Tibetan calendar: ཆུ་ཕོ་འབྲུག་ལོ་ (male Water-Dragon); 1419 or 1038 or 266 — to — ཆུ་མོ་སྦྲུལ་ལོ་ (female Water-Snake); 1420 or 1039 or 267

Year 1293 (MCCXCIII) was a common year starting on Thursday of the Julian calendar.

== Events ==
=== By area ===
==== Africa ====
- December – Mamluk sultan of Egypt Khalil is assassinated by his regent Baydara, who briefly claims the sultanate, before being assassinated himself by a rival political faction.

==== Asia ====
- May 26 – An earthquake in Kamakura, Japan kills an estimated 23,000.
- May 31 – The forces of Raden Wijaya win a major victory in the Mongol invasion of Java, which is considered to be the founding date of the city of Surabaya.
- The Japanese era Shōō ends, and the Einin era begins.
- Kublai Khan sends a fleet to the islands of Southeast Asia, including Java.
- The Hindu Majapahit Empire is founded by Kertarajasa in Java. It benefits from internal conflict and Mongol intervention, to defeat the Singhasari Kingdom and establish the empire.

==== Europe ====
- Torkel Knutsson leads Sweden in beginning the Third Swedish Crusade, against unchristianized Finnish Karelia. In the same year, the construction of Vyborg Castle begins, by orders of Knutsson.
- The Ordinances of Justice are enacted in the Commune of Florence.
- The Isle of Wight is sold to King Edward I of England by Isabella de Forz, Countess of Devon, on her deathbed, for 6,000 marks.

=== By topic ===
==== Arts and culture ====
- Dante Alighieri completes the book of verse La Vita Nuova.

==== Education ====
- May 20 – King Sancho IV of Castile creates a Studium General in Alcalá de Henares, forerunner to the modern Complutense University of Madrid.

==== Religion ====
- January – Ignatius bar Wahib becomes Syriac Orthodox Patriarch of Mardin.

== Births ==
- October 12 – Margaret de Clare, English noblewoman (d. 1342)
- Felim McHugh O'Connor (Feidhlimid Ó Conchobair), Irish King of Connacht (d. 1316)
- Philip VI of France (d. 1350)
- c.1293–94 – John of Ruysbroeck, Brabantian mystic (d. 1381)

== Deaths ==
- May 2 – Meir of Rothenburg, German rabbi (b. c.1215)
- June 29 – Henry of Ghent, philosopher (b. c.1217)
- November 10 – Isabel de Forz, 8th Countess of Devon (b. 1237)
- December 14 – Al-Ashraf Khalil, Mamluk sultan of Egypt (assassinated)
- David VI Narin, King of Georgia (b. 1225)
- Approximate date – William of Rubruck, Flemish Franciscan missionary (b. c.1220)
