= John of Genoa (astronomer) =

John of Genoa (Latin: Johannes de Janua) was an astronomer and physician at the University of Paris in the early 1330s. He composed three works on eclipses before serving as the pope's surgeon from 1342 to 1348.

== Life ==
John was possibly the nephew of the surgeon Anselm of Genoa, as claimed by Guy de Chauliac. Pierre Duhem took him to have been a discple of John of Lignères. He was not the same person as the canon of Genoa named John who was a master of medicine at Paris in 1328.

John was a master of arts at the time of his writings. In the computus of 1329–1330, a record of payments received by the University of Paris, John is recorded as living with two students in a house on the rue de Judas. He paid nine sous, the standard rate for a master. He was a bachelor of medicine on 20 January 1332, when he took the oath required before receiving his licentiate in medicine, which he received on 30 March.

In 1342, John became the surgeon of Pope Clement VI. Between 1342 and 1344, he was the patron at the Avignon curia of two clerks from Metz. He remained the pope's surgeon until 1348.

In the 1490s, Simon de Phares included an entry for John of Genoa in his Recueil des plus célèbres astrologues, but he based his information off of a single manuscript of John's Opus astronomicum.

== Works ==
John's table in a late manuscript

John wrote three known works in Latin, all on the calculation of eclipses and collectively known as his Opus astronomicum:

- Verum motum solis et lune
- Canones eclipsium
- Investigatio eclipsis solis ab anno Christi 1337

In addition to these prose works, John also created a table with columns for solar velocity, lunar velocity, apparent solar radius, apparent lunar radius and apparent radius of Earth's shadow. John's table was the most popular in the late Middle Ages, being extant in thirty manuscripts from before 1500, including Latin 7432. It influenced the work of John of Murs, Heinrich Selder and Nicholaus de Heybech. It is his most original work, since it was based on Ptolemy's second lunar model (like John of Montfort's table).

Verum motum solis et lune is a canon—a short explainer for using the table. It is found alongside the table in only fifteen manuscripts. Most of the time, the table was copied alongside other tables. In three further manuscripts, Verum motum stands alone without its table. It has three chapters, of which only the first is strictly about the table. Several manuscripts contain only the first chapter.

John's second work, Canones eclipsium, was completed on 22 January 1332. Seven copies are known. In his student copy, completed in 1409, Prosdocimo de' Beldomandi added his own commentary. The Canones is divided into five chapters, the first three on solar eclipses, the last two on lunar. John cites two sources, al-Battānī and John of Lignères, and there is textual evidence that he used John of Sicily as well. The Canones exercised great influence on John of Murs.

John's last work, Investigatio eclipsis solis, is a computation of the solar eclipse of 3 March 1337 known from three manuscripts, including a copy made by Lewis of Caerleon. John calculates the time of conjunction, the parallax, the duration and the magnitudes of the eclipse.

All of John's works were collected together in two manuscripts: Douai, Bibliothèque Municipale, 715, which includes his table, and Paris, Bibliothèque nationale de France, lat. 7281, which lacks the table.

== Bibliography ==
- Chabás, José; Goldstein, Bernard R. (2012). A Survey of European Astronomical Tables in the Late Middle Ages. Brill.
- Courtenay, William J. (1999). Parisian Scholars in the Early Fourteenth Century: A Social Portrait. Cambridge University Press.
- Miolo, Laure (2022). "Retracing the Tradition of John of Genoa's Opus astronomicum Through Extant Manuscripts". In Richard L. Kremer; Matthieu Husson; José Chabás (eds.). Alfonsine Astronomy: The Written Record. Brepols. pp. 343–380.
- Nothaft, C. Philipp E. (2019). "Jean des Murs's Canones tabularum Alfonsii of 1339". Erudition and the Republic of Letters. 4 (1): 98–122.
