= Caduceus =

Staff carried by Hermes in Greek mythology

Modern depiction of the caduceus as the symbol of logistics

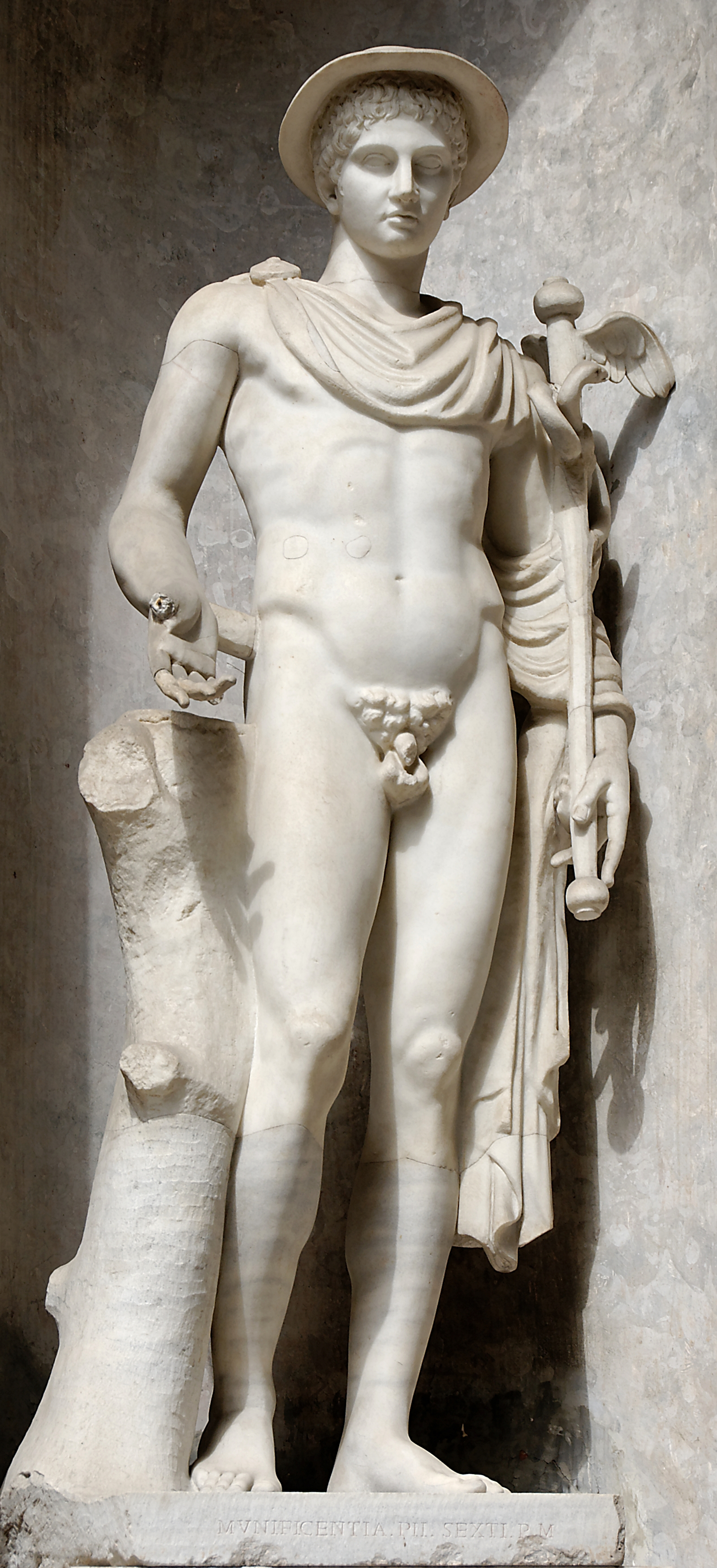
Hermes Ingenui (Note: It is unclear whether the inscription refers to a patron who paid for the statue, or to the sculptor of the statue.) carrying a winged caduceus upright in his left hand. A Roman copy after a Greek original of the 5th century BCE (Museo Pio-Clementino, Rome)

The caduceus (☤; /kəˈdjuːʃəs, -siəs/; from Latin cādūceus, from Ancient Greek κηρύκειον (kērúkeion) 'herald's wand, staff') (Note: The Latin word cādūceus is an adaptation of the Greek word, itself derived from Ancient Greek κῆρυξ (kêrux) 'messenger, herald, envoy'.) is the herald's staff carried by Hermes in Greek mythology and consequently by Hermes Trismegistus in Greco-Egyptian mythology. The same staff was borne by other heralds like Iris, the messenger of Hera. The short staff is entwined by two serpents, sometimes surmounted by wings. In Roman iconography, it was depicted being carried in the left hand of Mercury, the messenger of the gods.

The iconography of the caduceus may have roots in Mesopotamia with the Sumerian god Ningishzida, dating back to 4000 BC to 3000 BC. His symbol was a staff with two snakes intertwined around it, perhaps representing two snakes copulating.

As a symbol, it represents Hermes (or the Roman Mercury), and by extension trades, occupations, or undertakings associated with the god. In later Antiquity, the caduceus was stylized into the astronomical symbol for planet Mercury. Through its use in astrology, alchemy, and astronomy it has come to denote the planet Mercury and the eponymous planetary metal. It was said that the wand would wake the sleeping and send the wakeful to sleep. If applied to the dying, their death was gentle; if applied to the dead, they returned to life.

Extending its association with Mercury and Hermes, the caduceus is also a symbol of commerce and negotiation, areas of reciprocal exchange. This association persisted throughout classical antiquity to the modern era. The caduceus is also a symbol of printing, by association with the eloquence of Mercury.

The rod of Asclepius, a similar symbol with only one snake and no wings, is the most common traditional symbol of medicine, but the caduceus is sometimes used by healthcare organizations in the US.

== Classical antiquity ==
The Caduceus in classical imagery
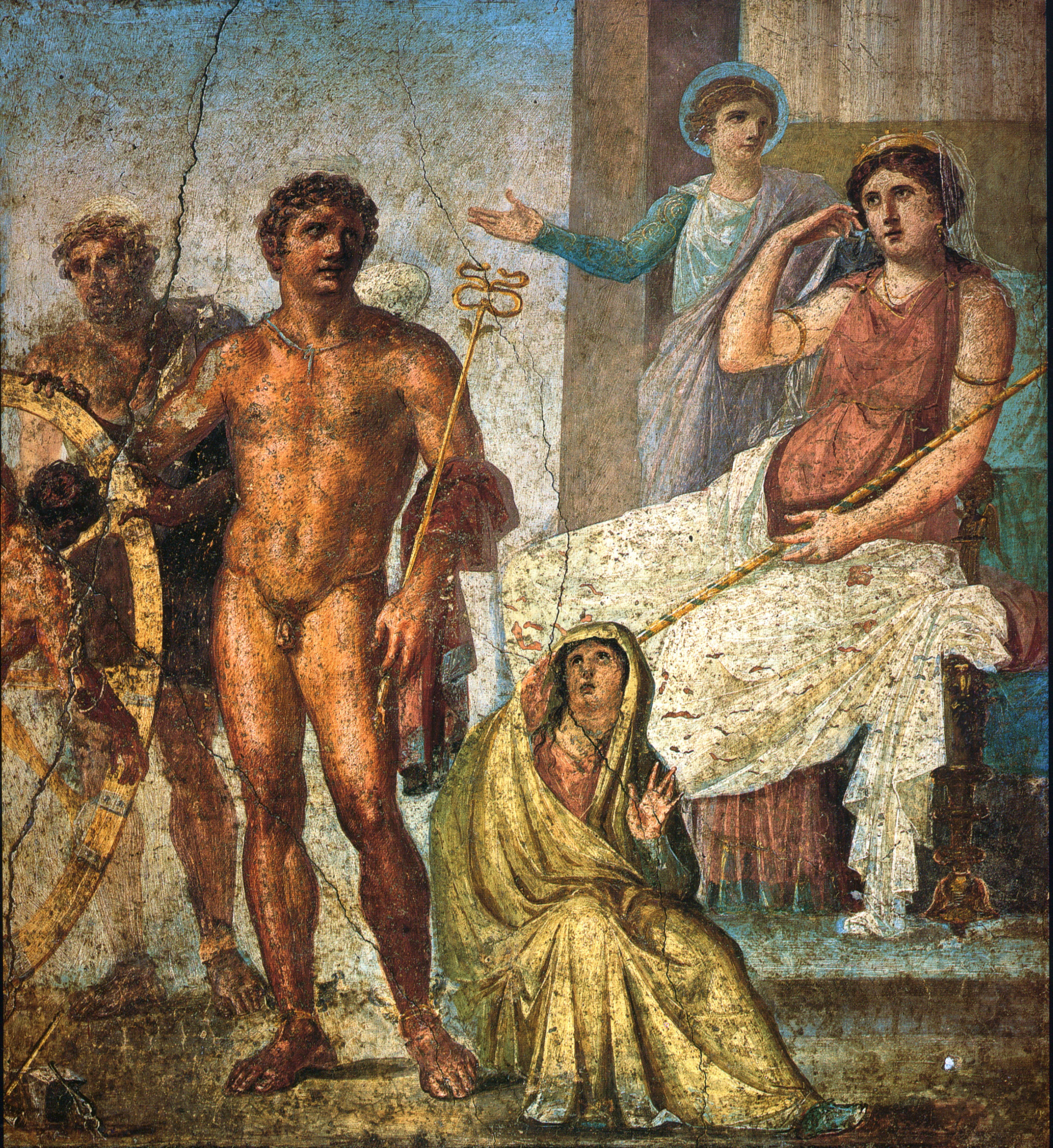
Fresco from Pompeii of the punishment of Ixion: in the center is Mercury holding the caduceus

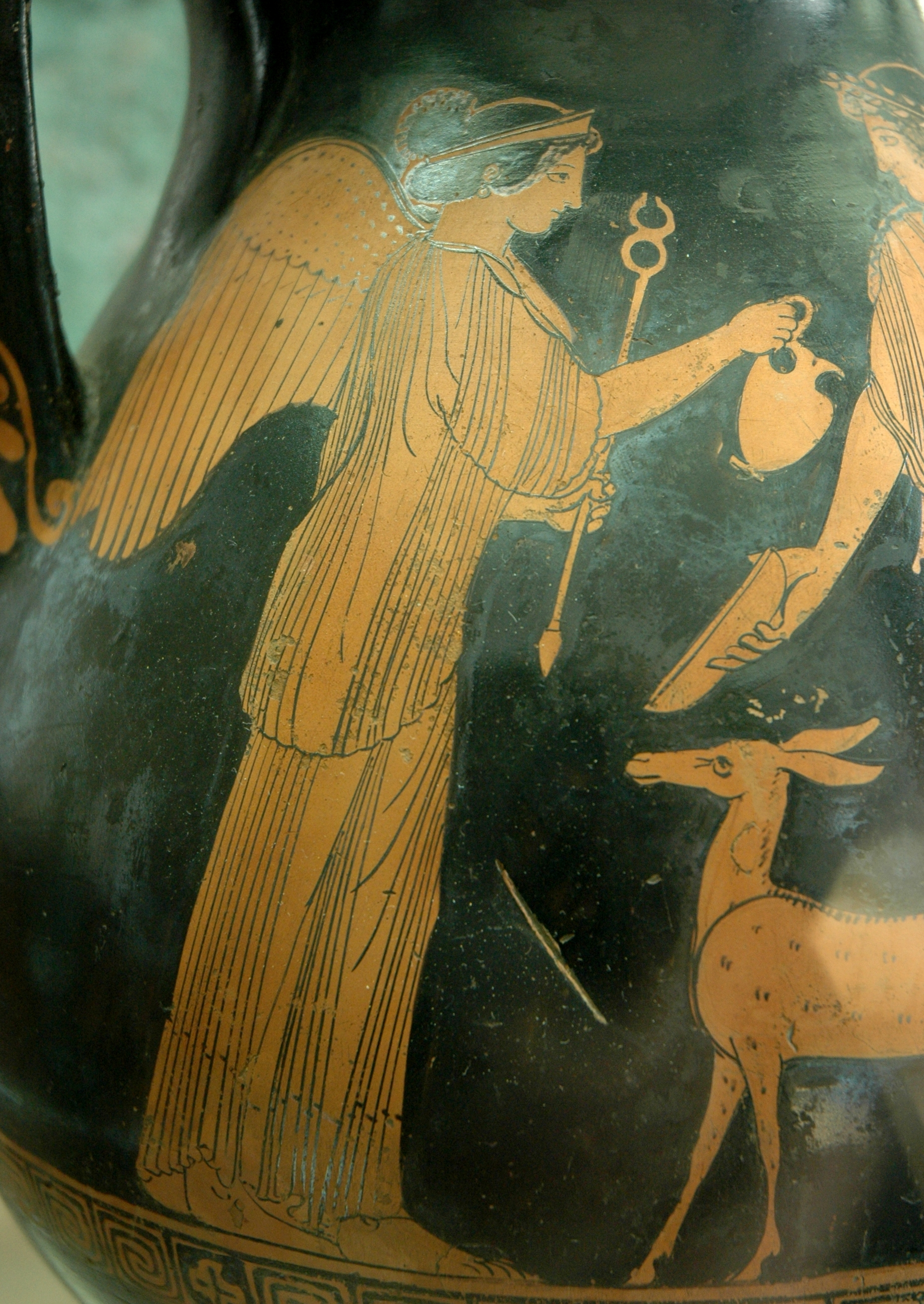
Iris with the caduceus in detail from an Attic red-figure pelike, middle of fifth century BC (Agrigento, Sicily)

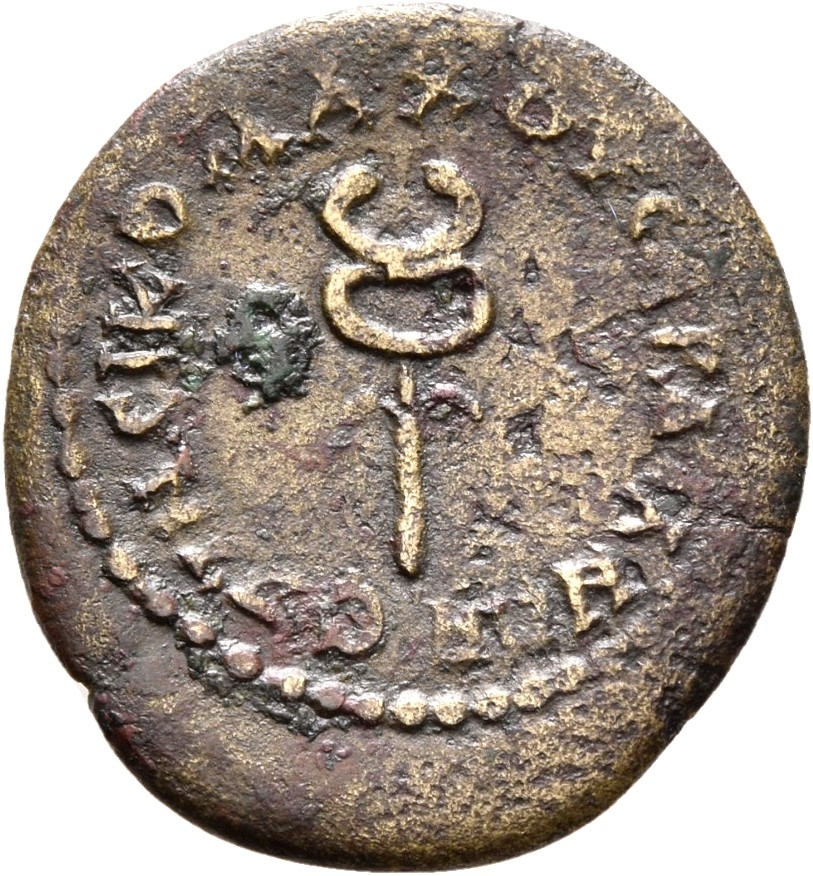
Coin from Sardis (present-day Turkey) with caduceus (c. 140-144 CE)

=== Mythology ===
The Homeric Hymn to Hermes relates how his half brother Apollo was enchanted by Hermes's music from his lyre fashioned from a tortoise shell, which Hermes kindly gave to him. Apollo in return gave Hermes the caduceus as a gesture of friendship. The association with the serpent thus connects Hermes to Apollo, as later the serpent was associated with Asclepius, the "son of Apollo".

The association of Apollo with the serpent is a continuation of the older Indo-European dragon-slayer motif. Wilhelm Heinrich Roscher (1913) pointed out that the serpent as an attribute of both Hermes and Asclepius is a variant of the "pre-historic semi-chthonic serpent hero known at Delphi as Python", who in classical mythology is slain by Apollo.

One Greek myth of origin of the caduceus is part of the story of Tiresias, who found two snakes copulating and killed the female with his staff. Tiresias was immediately turned into a woman, and so remained until he was able to repeat the act with the male snake seven years later. This staff later came into the possession of the god Hermes, along with its transformative powers.

Another myth suggests that Hermes (or Mercury) saw two serpents entwined in mortal combat. Separating them with his wand he brought about peace between them, and as a result the wand with two serpents came to be seen as a sign of peace.

In Rome, Livy refers to the caduceator who negotiated peace arrangements under the diplomatic protection of the caduceus he carried.

=== Iconography ===
In some vase paintings ancient depictions of the Greek kerukeion are somewhat different from the commonly seen modern representation. These representations feature the two snakes atop the staff (or rod), crossed to create a circle with the heads of the snakes resembling horns. This old graphic form, with an additional crossbar to the staff, seems to have provided the basis for the graphical sign of Mercury (☿) used in Greek astrology from late antiquity.

== Origin and comparative mythology ==
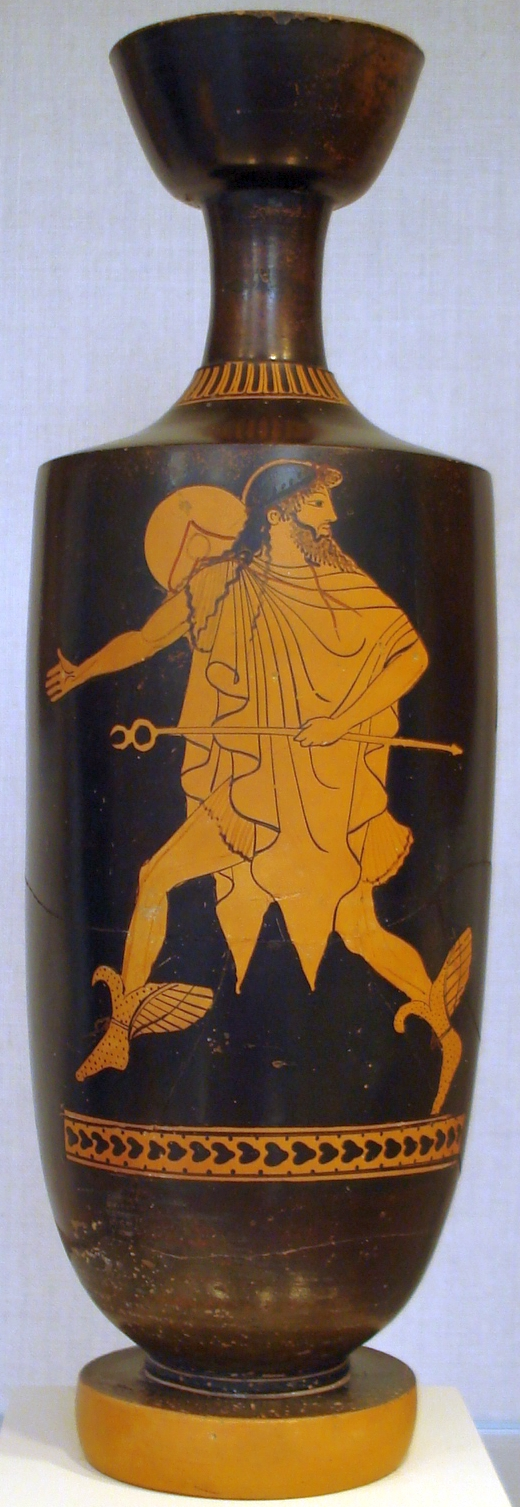
Hermes hastens bearing his kerukeion, on an Attic lekythos, c. 475 BC, attributed to the Tithonos Painter

The term kerukeion denoted any herald's staff, not necessarily associated with Hermes in particular.

In his study of the cult of Hermes, Lewis Richard Farnell (1909) assumed that the two snakes had simply developed out of ornaments of the shepherd's crook used by heralds as their staff. This view has been rejected by later authors pointing to parallel iconography in the Ancient Near East. It has been argued that the staff or wand entwined by two snakes was itself representing a god in the pre-anthropomorphic era. Like the herm or priapus, it would thus be a predecessor of the anthropomorphic Hermes of the classical era.

=== Ancient Near East ===
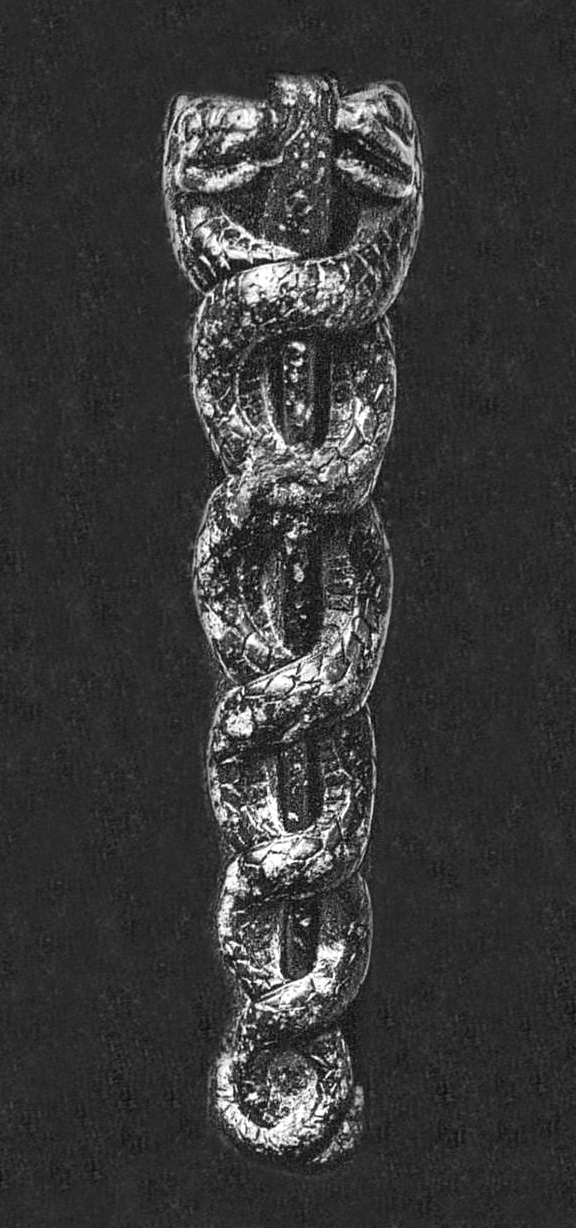
The Caduceus, symbol of God Ningishzida, on the libation vase of Sumerian ruler Gudea, c. 2100 BCE

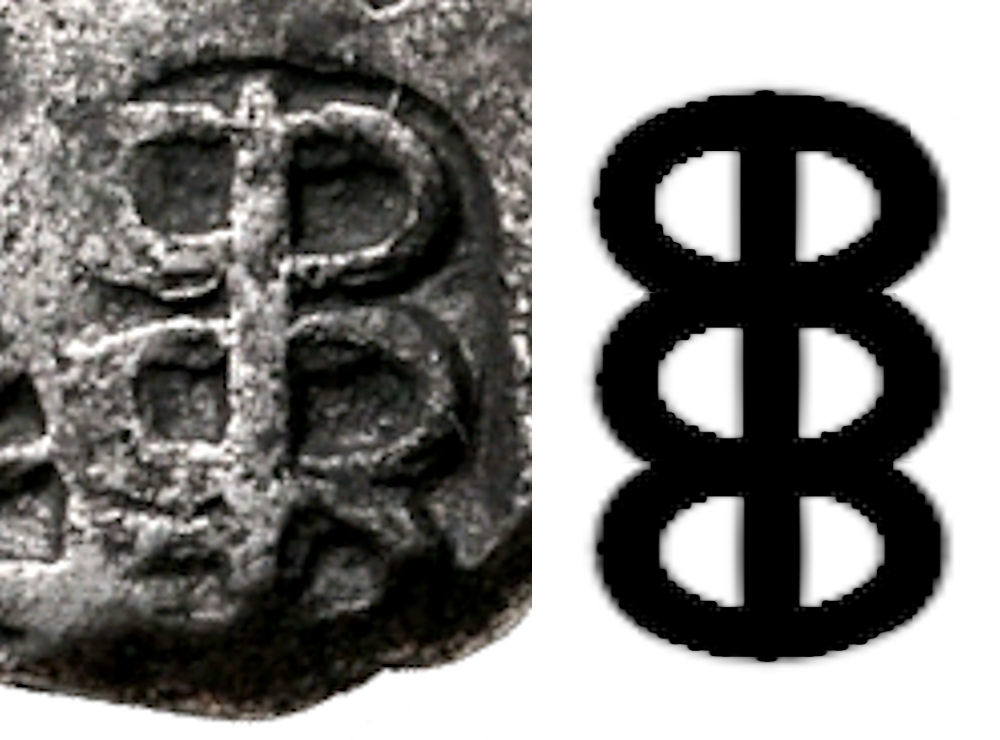
Caduceus symbol on a punch-marked coin of king Ashoka in India, third to second century BC

William Hayes Ward (1910) discovered that symbols similar to the classical caduceus sometimes appeared on Mesopotamian cylinder seals. He suggested the symbol originated some time between 3000 and 4000 BC, and that it might have been the source of the Greek caduceus. A.L. Frothingham incorporated Ward's research into his own work, published in 1916, in which he suggested that the prototype of Hermes was an "Oriental deity of Babylonian extraction" represented in his earliest form as a snake god. From this perspective, the caduceus was originally representative of Hermes himself, in his early form as the Underworld god Ningishzida, "messenger" of the "Earth Mother". The caduceus is mentioned in passing by Walter Burkert as "really the image of copulating snakes taken over from Ancient Near Eastern tradition".

In Egyptian iconography, the Djed pillar is depicted as containing a snake in a frieze of the Dendera Temple complex.

=== India ===
The caduceus also appears as a symbol of the punch-marked coins of the Maurya Empire in India, in the third or second century BC. Numismatic research suggest that this symbol was the symbol of the Buddhist king Ashoka, his personal "Mudra". This symbol was not used on the pre-Mauryan punch-marked coins, but only on coins of the Maurya period, together with the three arched-hill symbol, the "peacock on the hill", the triskelis and the Taxila mark. It also appears carved in basalt rock in few temples of western ghats.

== Early modern use ==
During the early modern period, the caduceus was used as a symbol of rhetoric (associated with Mercury's eloquence).

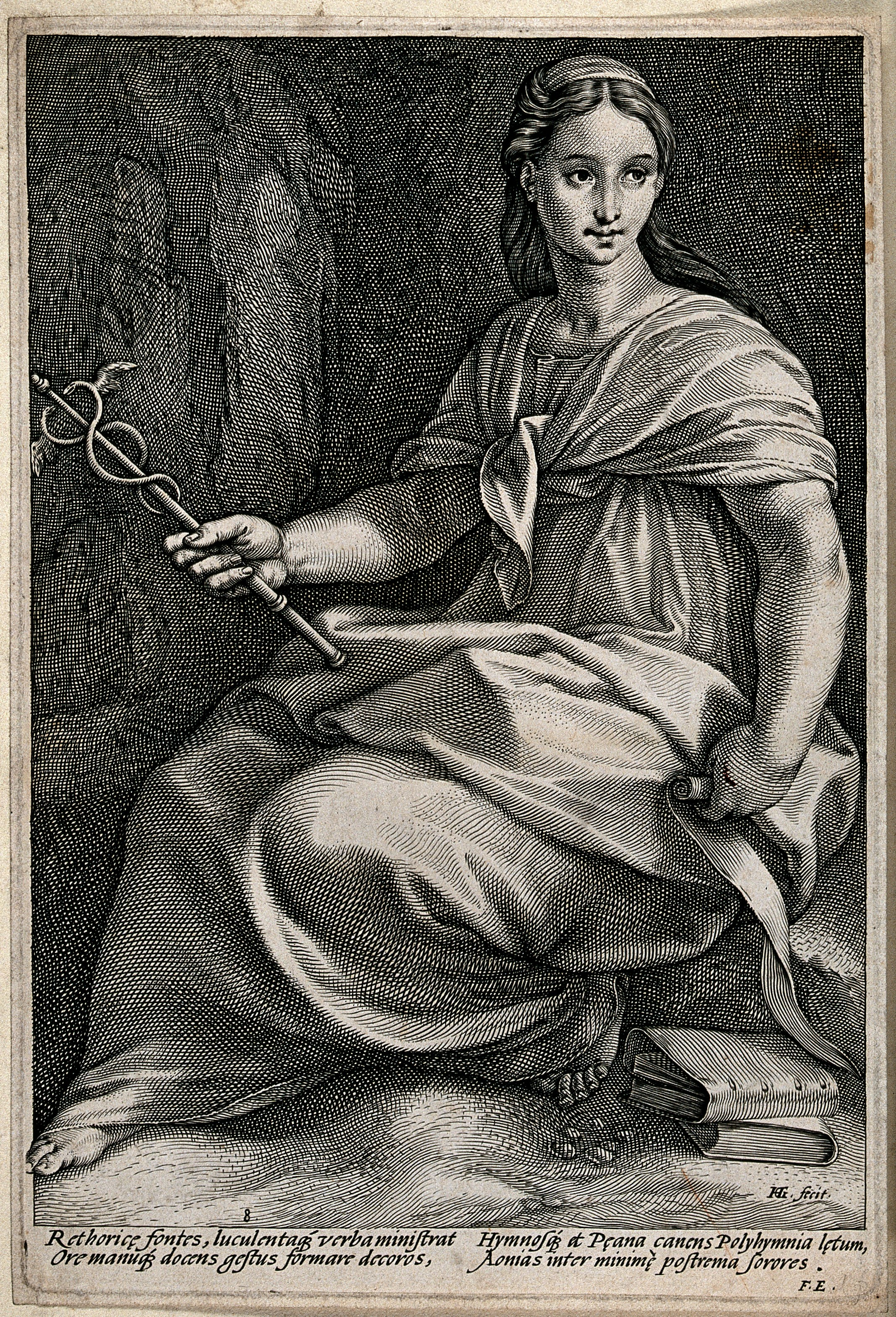
Engraving by Hendrik Goltzius (1558–1617)

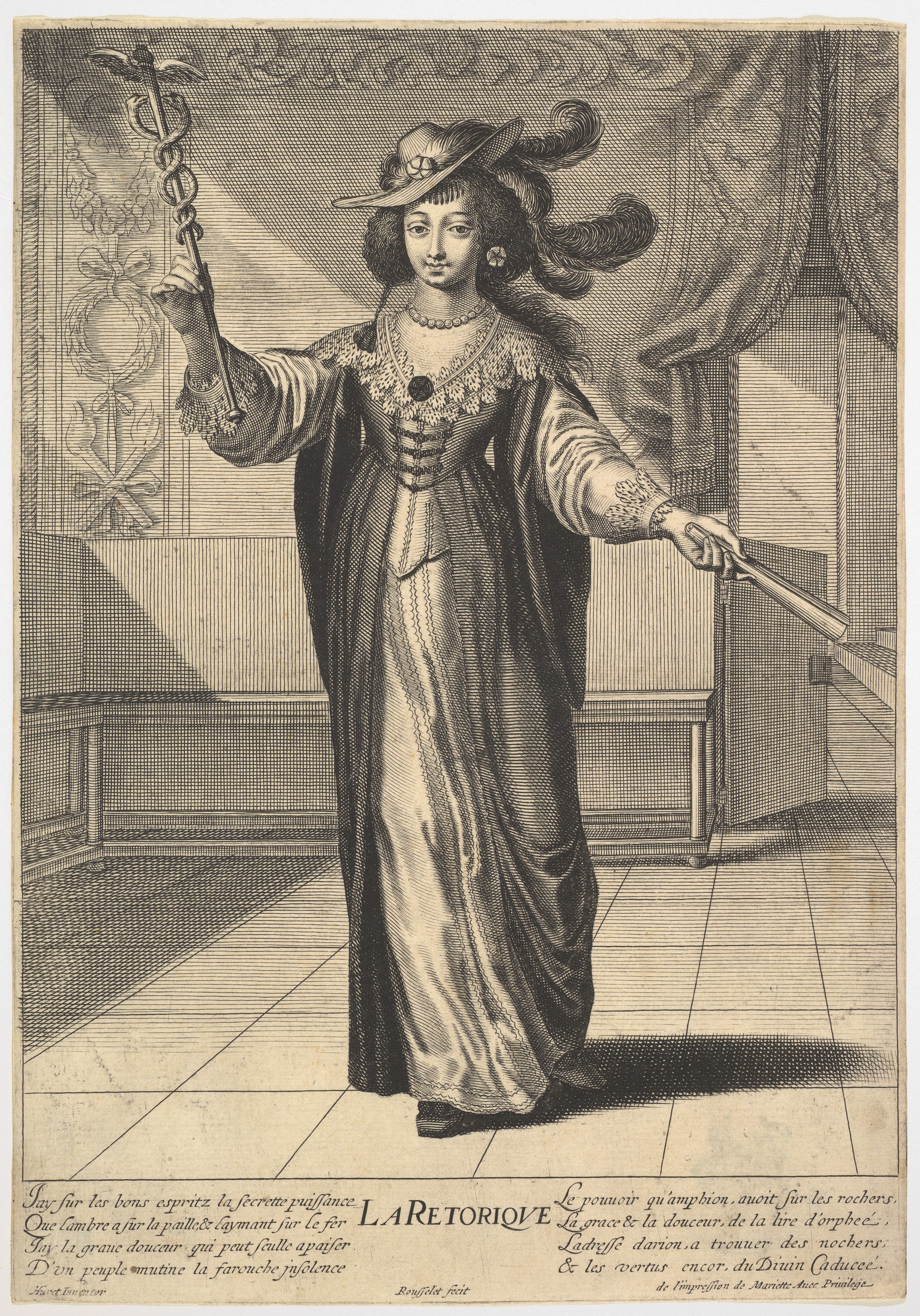
La Retorique (1633–35)

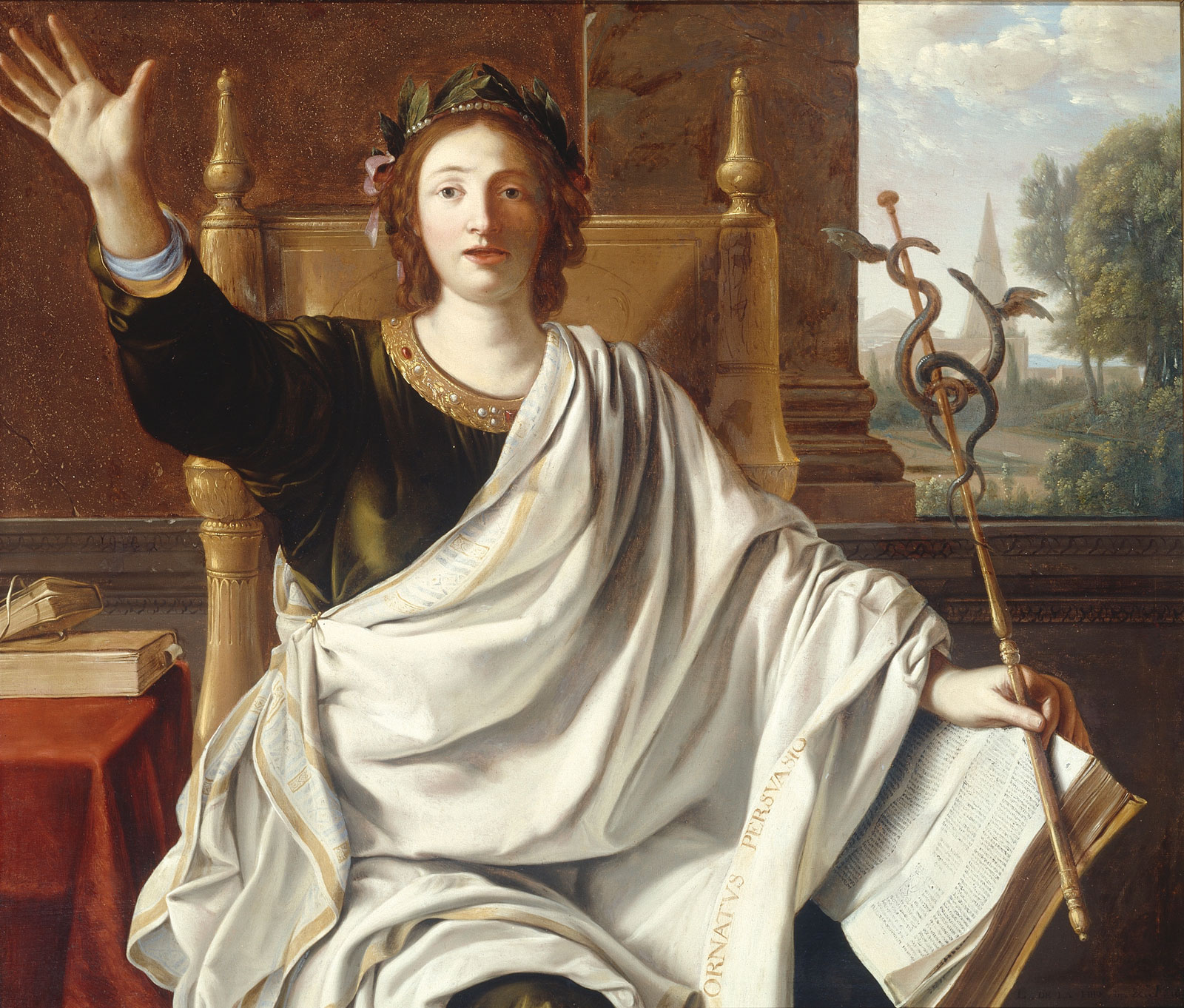
Allegory of Rhetoric (1650)

== Modern use ==
=== Association with printing ===
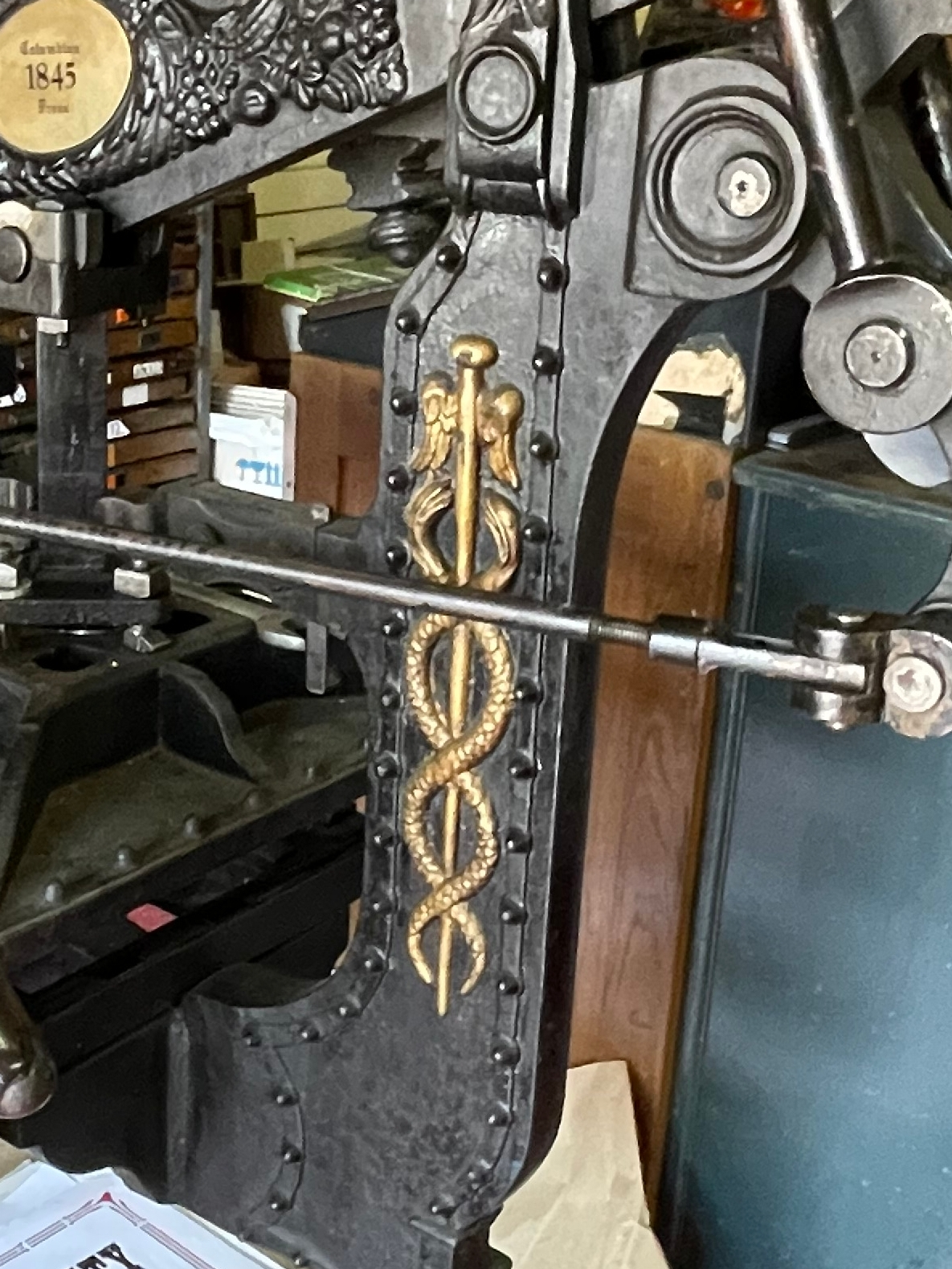
Part of an 1845 Columbian printing press, showing the caduceus that is part of the machine's elaborate decoration

The caduceus has sometimes been associated with printing.

Many early printers such as Erhard Ratdolt, Johann Froben and Johannes Tacuinus used it as their printer's mark. This was often in association with other symbols, such as a cornucopia or a Pegasus. It was also used on the Columbian press, a type of printing press widely used in the 19th century and known for its elaborate scheme of symbolic ornamentation.

The caduceus was used as a publisher's mark by John Churchill, who began publishing medical texts in London in the 1830s. This may have contributed to the symbol's association with medicine.

=== Symbol of commerce ===
A simplified caduceus is found in dictionaries, as a "commercial term" entirely in keeping with the association of Hermes with commerce. In this form, the staff is often depicted with two winglets and the snakes omitted or reduced to a small ring in the middle.

The customs service of the former German Democratic Republic demonstrated the caduceus' association with thresholds, translators, and commerce in the service medals issued to their staff. The caduceus is also the symbol of the customs agency of Bulgaria and of the financial administration of the Slovakia (Tax and Customs administration). The emblems of Belarus Customs and China Customs are a caduceus crossing with a golden key. The emblem of the Federal Customs Service of Russia has a caduceus crossing with a torch on the shield.

The coat of arms of Kyiv National University of Trade and Economics of Ukraine has two crossed torches surmounted by a caduceus on the shield.

=== Confusion with Rod of Asclepius ===
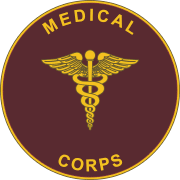
The US Army Medical Corps plaque. The adoption, in 1902, of the caduceus for US Army medical officer uniforms popularized the (mis)use of the symbol throughout the United States' medical field

Rod of Asclepius

It is relatively common, especially in the United States, to find the caduceus, with its two snakes and wings, (mis)used as a symbol of medicine instead of the Rod of Asclepius, with only a single snake. This usage was popularized by the adoption of the caduceus as its insignia by the U.S. Army Medical Corps in 1902 at the insistence of a single officer (though there are conflicting claims as to whether this was Capt. Frederick P. Reynolds or Col. John R. van Hoff).

The Rod of Asclepius is the dominant symbol for professional healthcare associations in the United States. One survey found that 62% of professional healthcare associations used the rod of Asclepius as their symbol. The same survey found that 76% of commercial healthcare organizations use the caduceus. The author of the study suggests that professional associations are more likely to have a historical understanding of the two symbols, whereas commercial organizations are more likely to be concerned with the visual impact a symbol will have on its sales.

The long-standing historical association of the caduceus with commerce has engendered significant criticism of its use in medicine. Medical professionals argue that the Rod of Asclepius better represents the field of medicine. Writing in the journal Scientific Monthly, Stuart L. Tyson said of the Staff of Hermes (the caduceus):

As god of the high-road and the market-place Hermes was perhaps above all else the patron of commerce and the fat purse: as a corollary, he was the special protector of the traveling salesman. As spokesman for the gods, he not only brought peace on earth (occasionally even the peace of death), but his silver-tongued eloquence could always make the worse appear the better cause. From this latter point of view, would not his symbol be suitable for certain Congressmen, all medical quacks, book agents and purveyors of vacuum cleaners, rather than for the straight-thinking, straight-speaking therapeutist? As conductor of the dead to their subterranean abode, his emblem would seem more appropriate on a hearse than on a physician's car.

— Stuart L. Tyson, "The Caduceus", in the Scientific Monthly, 1932

== Computer coding ==
☤o

Caduceus
- In Unicode: U+2624 ☤ CADUCEUS

Different from
- Different from: U+2695 ⚕ STAFF OF AESCULAPIUS; U+269A ⚚ STAFF OF HERMES

Related
- See also: U+263F ☿ MERCURY; U+1F750 🝐 ALCHEMICAL SYMBOL FOR CADUCEUS; U+2BDA ⯚ HYGIEA

For use in documents prepared on computer, the symbol has code point in Unicode, at U+2624 ☤ CADUCEUS. There is a similar glyph encoded at U+269A ⚚ STAFF OF HERMES, an alchemical symbol at U+1F750 🝐 ALCHEMICAL SYMBOL FOR CADUCEUS, and an astrological one at U+2BDA ⯚ HYGIEA. [For information on how to enter the symbol, see Unicode input (or copy/paste it directly).] These symbols are not provided in all fonts, especially older ones.

== Coats of arms and flags ==
The symbol is depicted on multiple coats of arms and flags.

Caduceus in coats of arms and flags
Coat of arms of Ecuador

Caduceus on the coat of arms of Jyväskylä, Finland

Coat of arms of Tampere, Finland

Coat of arms of Lassay-les-Châteaux, France

Coat of arms of Saint-Pantaléon, France

Coat of arms of Gmina Nur, Poland

Emblem of the Federal Customs Service of Russia

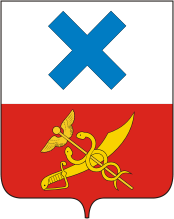
Coat of arms of Irbit, Russia

Coat of arms of Bengtsfors Municipality, Sweden

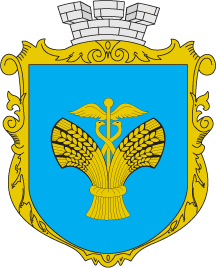
Coat of arms of Balta, Ukraine

Coat of arms of Berdychiv, Ukraine

Coat of arms of Kharkiv, Ukraine

Emblem of the Volapük language

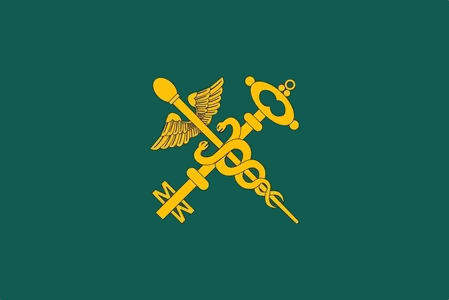
Customs flag of Belarus, with a Caduceus crossed with a golden key at the center

Customs flag of China, with a Caduceus crossed with a golden key at the lower fly half

Flag of the City of Brisbane, Australia

Flag of Vancouver Island, Canada (unofficial)

== See also ==
- Aaron's rod – Staves carried by Moses's brother, Aaron, in the Torah
- Amphisbaena – Mythological serpent
- Bowl of Hygieia – Symbol of pharmacy
- Crozier – Ceremonial staff in Christianity
- Double-headed eagle – Symbol used in heraldry
- Healing Simurgh – Symbol of medicine in Iran
- Mithraic mysteries – Mystery religion in the Roman Empire
- Nehushtan – Brass serpent in Torah
- Ningishzida – Mesopotamian god
- Serpent (symbolism) – Mythological symbol
- Staff of Moses – Walking stick used by Moses
- Star of Life – Emergency medical service symbol

== Sources ==
- Friedlander, Walter J. (1992). The Golden Wand of Medicine: A History of the Caduceus Symbol in Medicine. Greenwood Press. ISBN 978-0-313-28023-8..
- Lisman, J.W. (2013). Cosmogony, Theogony and Anthropogeny in Sumerian texts. Ugarit-Verlag.
- Tyson, Stuart L. (1932). "The Caduceus". The Scientific Monthly. 34 (6): 492–498. Bibcode:1932SciMo..34..492T.
