= John of Genoa =

John of Genoa or Johannes de Janua may refer to:

- John Balbi (died c. 1298), Italian grammarian and Dominican
- John of Genoa (astronomer) (fl. 1329–1348), astronomer and surgeon
- Johannes de Janua (composer) (fl. 1400), Italian composer
