= John of Saxony (astronomer) =

Medieval German astrologer

John of Saxony (also Johannes de Saxonia, John Danko or Dancowe of Saxony) was a medieval astronomer. Although his exact birthplace is unknown it is believed he was born in Germany, most likely Magdeburg. His scholarly work is believed to date from the end of the 13th century into the mid 14th century. He spent most of his active career, from about 1327 to 1355, at the University of Paris.

== Scholarship ==
John of Saxony is quoted in various medieval manuscripts and referenced as the author of various astronomical or astrological treatises, even though his authorship in some cases is questionable.

A computus dating back to 1297 is attributed to John of Saxony even though the author is listed as Iohannes Alemanus. The fact that the geographical longitudes of Paris and Magdeburg, considered John's birthplace, among other facts is why some historians consider him the author.

Viewed with less suspicion is his commentary on Liber Introductorius ad Magisterium Idiciorum Astrorum written by al-Qabisi (Alcabitius), an Arab scholar from the late 10th century. John of Saxony's commentary on this treatise is preserved in many manuscripts, several incunabula and old prints, the latest of which dates from the middle of the 16th century.

Among his other contributions were a commentary on Alcabitius's Introduction to the art of astrology, which went through eleven printed editions, and an Almanach for the years 1336 to 1380 that he computed for the meridian of Paris using the Alfonsine tables.

John of Saxony was of the opinion that astronomers of that time wrote their works in such a confusing manner that those who weren't trained in the field couldn't comprehend nor use them appropriately. Under the tutelage of his master, John of Ligneres, he sought to write tables that accounted for any situation and could be put to practical use. As he puts it: "Therefore to the praise of glorious God, the honor of my master, and the profit of scholars who wish to learn the workings of astronomical tables, I, John of Saxony, with God's aid intend to give examples of all the operations which are commonly performed with tables so that there may be no one henceforth who will shrink from the use and employment of tables of the stars because of the difficulty working with them."

== Alfonsine Tables ==
The more widely recognized work by John of Saxony is his Canons on the Alfonsine Tables. The Alfonsine Tables are the mathematical calculations from Ptolemy's Almagest with limited modifications. These tables for calculating planetary positions, prepared under the auspices of Alfonso X, were originally in Castilian. They were also used to derive ecliptic longitudes for planets for any chosen time and observer's position, lunar phases, lunar and solar eclipses, as well as calendar dates. Like the 11th century Toledan Tables before them, the Alfonsine Tables were based on the geocentric model of the planetary system as described in Ptolemy's Almagest. Around 1320, the Alfonsine Tables appeared in Paris where they were studied at the University of Paris by astronomers John of Ligneres, John of Saxony, and later Johannes de Muris.

In order to study the tables, they were translated from Castilian into Latin, which was the scholarly language of the day. This is due in large part to the Catholic upbringing of the day in medieval Europe. This act alone allowed greater access and understanding of astronomical work to that point. In 1327 he added an influential set of explanations and instructions (Canons) to the revision of the Alfonsine Tables by his master, John of Ligneres. His intent was to allow students at the University of Paris to utilize the astronomical tables.

The canons of John of Saxony explained how one could find the planetary position (longitudes) at any given time. One would have to calculate the length of time between the basic year and the year sought. They would then divide them by mean figures of the planetary orbits, and add/subtract values to adjust for hours and minutes. To expedite these calculations he had an accompanying table of sexagesimal multiplication. In addition to this, he divided the day into sixty parts rather than 24 hours, consistently representing time by sexagesimal fractions and multiples of a day. It is in this form that the Alfonsine tables circulated in Western Europe for the next three centuries.

After translation and Canons were added to the Alfonsine Tables, they were disseminated from Paris to the rest of medieval Europe. As they were received, the tables were converted to the local meridians for proper use. Although widely used, a published print version of the tables and John of Saxony's Canons didn't exist. It wasn't until 1483 when Erhard Ratdolt in Venice published both. To date neither John of Ligneres' or Johannes de Muris' canons have been published in print.
