= The Berkeley Treatise =

The Berkeley Treatise is an anonymous 14th-century compilation of musicological writings. The treatise is in five sections: concerning fundamentals and mode, discant, mensuration, musica speculativa and tuning. The third section on mensuration is a version of the Libellus cantus mensurabilis by Johannes de Muris, dated to 1375.
