= John of Lignères =

John of Lignéres or Johannes de Lineriis (fl. 1320 – c. 1335) was a French astronomer who wrote several works on the calculation of moon, sun, and planetary positions. Many of his works are confounded with the works of similar named Parisian astronomer collaborators and students including John of Murs, John of Sicily, John of Saxony, and John of Montfort. His works were important in importing Arabic astronomical calculations into European traditions.

John was from Amiens and lived in Paris from 1320 to 1335. He may have been born in Ligneres, 37 km southeast of Amiens. Little is known of his life other than his writings. He is considered as the key promoter of the Alfonsine tables in Europe. His works include tables, canons to the tables and a treatise on instruments. Around 1320 he published the Canones super tabulas equationum (also called the canons of the Primum Mobile) in three parts. In 1325 he published the Tabule magne which makes corrections and calculations specifically for Paris. Around 1327 he wrote canons Quia ad inveniendum loca planetarum on the use of Alfonsine tables. He also wrote on the "saphea" (a kind of astrolabe) and a directorium (another kind of astrolable used in astrology). He also wrote a Theorica planetarum in 1335 which begins with Spera concentrica vel circulus dicitur.
