= Denis Le Grant =

14th-century medieval French composer

Denis Le Grant (died March 1352), also known as Dionysius Magni, was a French composer in the ars nova style of late medieval music. Only known for the chace Se ie chans, he was well associated with the French musicians of his time, including Johannes de Muris, Philippe de Vitry and probably Guillaume de Machaut.

== Life and career ==
Extremely little is known of Denis Le Grant. In 1349 he is known to have been master of the French royal chapel. Some point before 1350 he was the treasurer of Saint-Frambourg in Senlis. He left this post in 23 December 1350, and from then on he was Bishop of Senlis; Denis died in March 1352. The musicologists Richard Hoppin and Suzanne Clercx have identified him with 'Dionisius Normannus', mentioned in the Musicalis/Scientia motet, though this is uncertain.

He is mentioned in the motet Apollinis/Zodiacum, along with other musicians including Johannes de Muris, Philippe de Vitry and Henricus Helene. Denis is known to have been acquainted with Vitry, and borrowed music and astronomy books from Muris. His musical quotation of Guillaume de Machaut suggests he was associated with him as well.

== Music ==
Denis is only known for a single composition, a chace entitled Se ie chans, which is mentioned by the French poet Gace de la Buigne in his hunting treatise Roman des Deduis. The motet's opening quotes the text of Coument/Se ie chante/Qui prendroit, an ars antiqua motet, which also appears in Machaut's Pour ce que tous mes chans fais (B12).
