= Haly Abenragel =

Arab astrologer

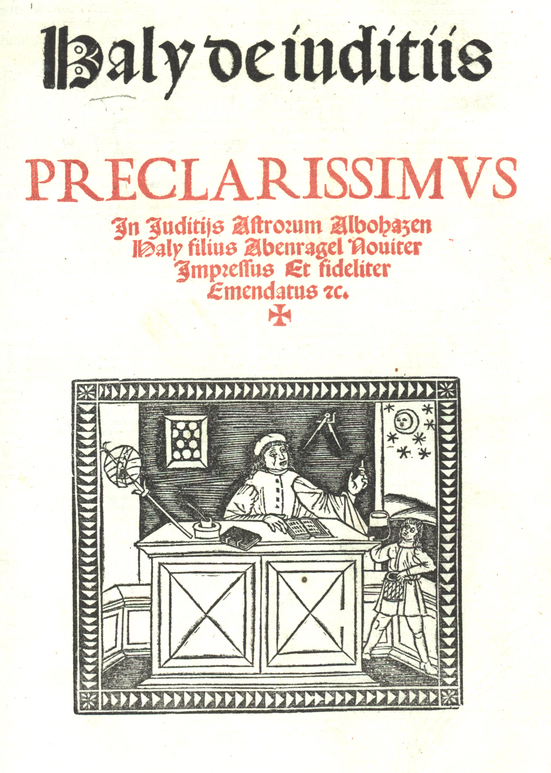
Complete Book on the Judgment of the Stars from 1523

Abū l-Ḥasan 'Alī ibn Abī l-Rijāl al-Shaybani (Arabic: أبو الحسن علي ابن أبي الرجال) (commonly known in European languages as Haly, Hali, Albohazen Haly filii Abenragel or Haly Abenragel, from ibn Rijal) was an Arab astrologer of the 10th to 11th century CE / 4th to 5th century AH best known for his Kitāb al-bāri' fī aḥkām an-nujūm.

== Life ==
He was a court astrologer to the Tunisian prince al-Mu'izz ibn Bâdis in the first half of the 11th century CE / 5th century AH. Haly died after 1037/428 in Kairouan in what is now Tunisia.

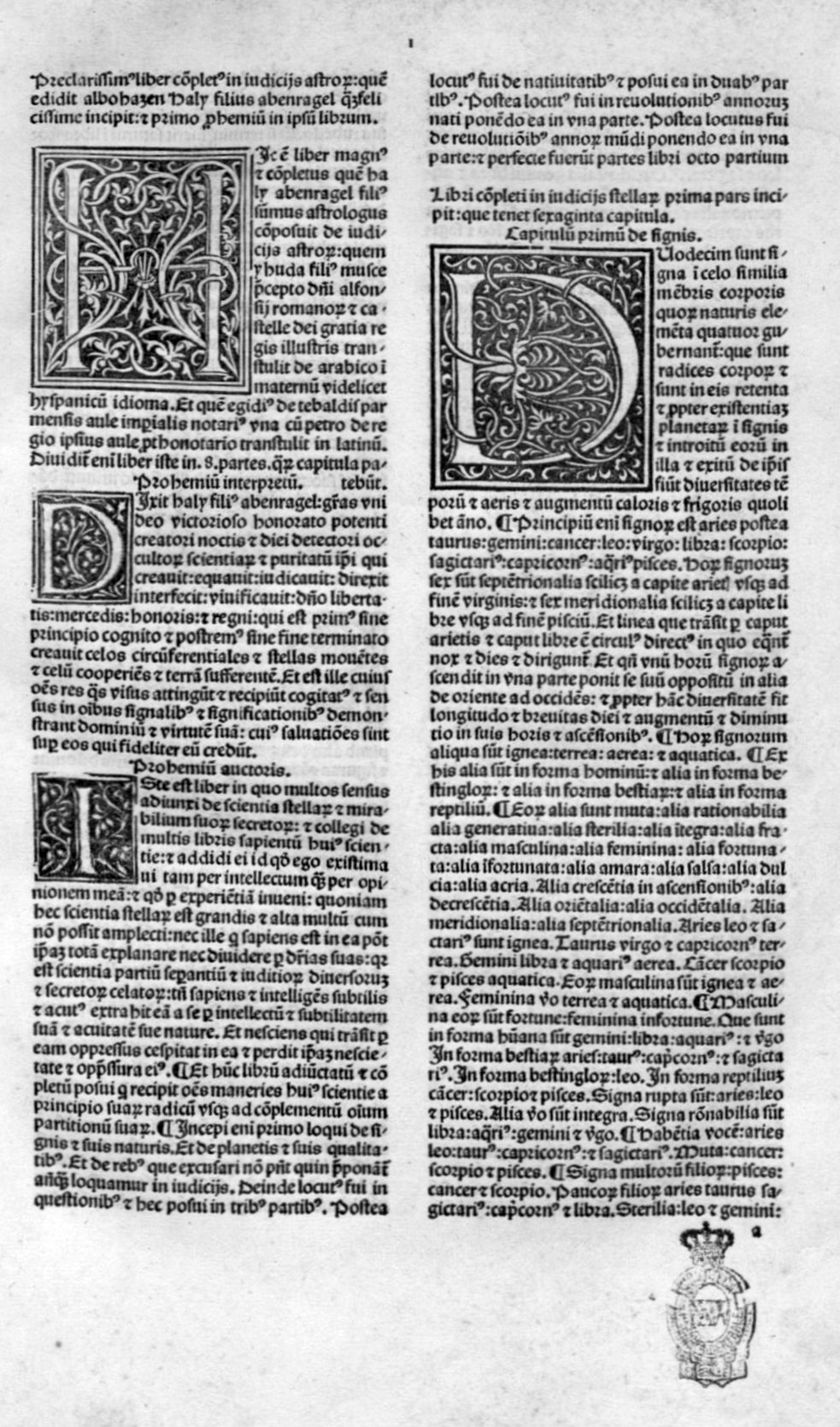
Preclarissimus liber completus in iudiciis astrorum (Kitāb al-bāri' fi akhām an-nujūm), 1485

== Works ==
His Kitāb al-bāri' fī aḥkām an-nujūm was translated by Yehudā ben Moshe into Old Castilian for Alfonso X of Castile in 1254 under the title El libro conplido en los iudizios de las estrellas ("The complete book on the judgment of the stars"). The only surviving manuscript of the Old Castilian translation is MS 3065 at the National Library in Madrid, which however only contains 5 of the 8 books of the complete Old Castilian translation. An edition created in 1523, created in Venice and presented in Latin, is held in the Qatar National Library.

In 1485 at Venice a complete copy of the Old Castilian manuscript was translated into Latin and published by Erhard Ratdolt as Praeclarissimus liber completus in judiciis astrorum ("The very famous complete book on the judgment of the stars"). This printing (and later Latin versions) is commonly known as De iudiciis astrorum (or De judiciis astrorum).

His Tractatus de cometarum significationibus per xii signa zodiaci (Treatise on the Significations of Comets in the twelve Signs of the Zodiac) was printed in Nürnberg in 1563 as an addendum to Marcus Frytsch's Meteororum, hoc est, impressionum aerearum et mirabilium naturæ operum, loci ferè omnes ... Item catalogus prodigiorum atque ostentorum, tam cœlo quam in terra ... omnia ab authore recognita et locupletata. (Tractatus Albohazenhalii, filii Abenragelis, de cometarum significationibus per XII. signa Zodiaci.)

== Editions ==
- Kitāb al-bāri' fi akhām an-nujūm (in Latin). Venezia: Erhard Ratdolt. 1485.

== See also ==
- List of Arab scientists and scholars
- Alchabitius
- Biruni
- Judicial astrology
