= Healing Simurgh =

Symbol of medicine in Iran

The Healing Simurgh (Simorgh, Seemorgh) (Persian: سیمرغ درمانگر) is the symbol of medicine in Iran. The name is inspired by Simurgh the Persian mythical flying creature, to which healing capacities have been attributed in Ferdowsi's Shahnameh.

== History of Simurgh ==
Simurgh goes back to ancient Iranian empires. This is a stylized design of Simurgh which was used as the emblem of the Sassanid dynasty.

The concept and the logo design of the Healing Simurgh was approved by the supreme board of the Islamic Republic of Iran's Medical Council in November 2013 as the emblem of the Physicians Guild of Iran, replacing the Caduceus.

In the summer of 2013, the emblem was introduced by Mahmoud Fazel, MD, the vice president of Iran's Medical Council. It was later developed by a group of renowned scholars including Jalal al-Din Kazzazi, Persian literary scholar, Mehdi Mohaghegh, author and director of the Society for the Appreciation of Cultural works and Dignitaries, Alireza Zali, President of Iran's Medical Council, Professor Nasrin Moazzemi, Biologist and member of UNESCO's Scientific Board of the International Basic Sciences Programme, and Ali Javadi Pouya, sustainable development activist and the CEO of Iran's Sustainable Development Strategy Group. The board formed a permanent association to continue with the subsequent activities required for the overhaul of Iran's national emblem for medicine, and for safeguarding this intangible cultural heritage.

The previous sign (bowl and snakes) was considered to be primarily focused on physical health. However, in the works of the prominent Iranian scholar and one of the precursors of medicine in the world, Avicenna, there is a more comprehensive understanding of health. He claims that health (sihha) is the "disposition of human body with respect to its temperament and structure such that all of [its] actions [or functions] proceed from it in a sound and unimpaired way." Thus the board argued that the Healing Simurgh can better represent the Iranian historical concept of health.

== The Healing Simurgh's Logo ==
The official logo of the Healing Simurgh was designed by Touraj Saberivand, an Iranian graphic designer, and was also published as a posting stamp by the Islamic Republic of Iran Post Company.
