= John of Saxony =

John of Saxony is the name of:

- John the Old Saxon an Anglo-Saxon scholar and abbot of Athelney
- John I, Duke of Saxony (1249–1285, Duke 1260–1282)
- John of Saxony (astronomer) (fl. 1327–1355).
- John, Elector of Saxony (1468–1532).
- John, King of Saxony (1801–1873, King of Saxony, 1854–1873).
