= Al-Qabisi =

10th century Arabian astrologer

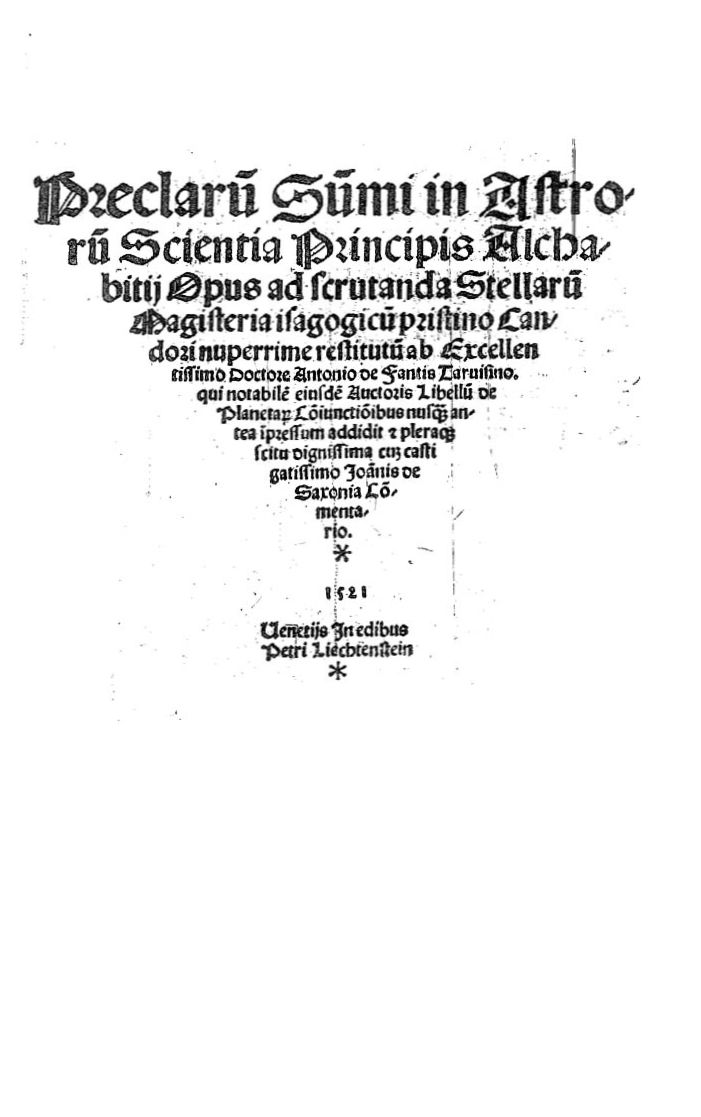
Opus ad scrutanda stellarum magisteria isagogicum, Latin translation from 1521

Abu al-Saqr Abd al-Aziz ibn Uthman ibn Ali al-Qabisi, generally known as Al-Qabisi, (Latinised as Alchabitius or Alcabitius), and sometimes known as Alchabiz, Abdelazys, Abdilaziz (Arabic: 'Abd al-Azîz, عبدالعزيز القبيصي), (died 967) was a Muslim astrologer, astronomer, and mathematician.

ʿAbd al-ʿAzīz ibn ʿUthmān al-Qabīṣī was a prominent astrologer of the 10th century. On the basis of a reference in the Fihrist, he is generally regarded as a contemporary of Ibn al-Nadim. He was probably born in al-Qabīṣ, a place-name associated with two locations in Iraq, one near Mosul and another near Samarra. He may have been of Persian descent.

His principal surviving work is al-Madkhal ilā ṣināʿat aḥkām al-nujūm (“Introduction to the Craft of the Judgments of the Stars”), which was dedicated to Sayf al-Dawla, the Hamdanid ruler of Aleppo. The work was translated into Latin by John of Seville in 1144, and a French translation, probably based on the Latin version, was produced by Pèlerin de Prusse in 1362.

Three shorter works by al-Qabīṣī also survive in a single manuscript held in the Hagia Sophia collection in Istanbul. These are a treatise on types of numbers and computational procedures, Risāla fī al-abʿād wa-al-ajrām (“Treatise on Bodies and Distances”), and an exposition of Al-Farghani's Book of Seasons. The first two works were likewise dedicated to Sayf al-Dawla.

Al-Qabīṣī's writings had considerable influence in medieval Europe. A Latin work printed in Lyon between 1519 and 1523 appears to be a commentary either on al-Madkhal ilā ṣināʿat aḥkām al-nujūm or possibly on one of al-Qabīṣī's lost works. The commentary was written by John of Saxony, a 14th-century astronomer associated with the University of Paris.

== Life ==
Originally from Qabisa in Iraq, Alchabitius later went to Aleppo where he worked for and lived in the palace of Sayf al-Dawla. He died in 967.

== Work ==
Al-Qabisi is best known for his treatise on judicial astrology, Introduction to the Art of Judgments of the Stars. This was dedicated to the Emir of Aleppo, Prince Sayf al-Dawla, and survives in at least twenty-five Arabic manuscripts, and over two hundred manuscripts of its Latin translation, with twelve printed editions of the Latin work between 1473 and 1521. The Arabic text has received at least three Latin translations, which attracted several commentaries and were, in turn, translated into other European languages. In the 12th century it was translated by Johannes Hispalensis. In 1512 it was published by Melchiorre Sessa in Venice. The 1473 copy, and others up until 1521, features writing about Al-Qabisi by John of Saxony, who commented his astrological works.

Al-Qabisi wrote a modest book on arithmetic, "Risala fi anwâ' al-‘adad" (Treatise on the kinds of numbers), in which he discusses Euclid's perfect numbers and how to form them, and Thābit ibn Qurra's theorem on amicable numbers.

Other works include:

- Risala fi al-ab'âd wa-'l-ajrâm (A treatise on distances and bodies);
- Kitāb fi ithbāt ṣinā’at Aḥkām al-nujūm (On Confirming the Art of Astrology);
- Hal al-Zîjat (Solving astronomical tables);
- Risāla fī imtiḥān al-munajjimīn (A treatise for the examination of astrologers)
- Shukūk al-Majisṭī (Doubts on the Almagest);

The belief in the power of stars dated back to Alexandrinian sect of iatromathematicians and the more ancient cult of Hermes Trismegistos.

== See also ==
- Al-Biruni
- Haly Abenragel
