= Coat of arms of Tampere =

- Armiger: Ilmari Nurminen, Mayor of Tampere
- Adopted: 1960

The former coat of arms of Tampere (1839–1960)

Tampere received its first seal in 1803, depicting the city's buildings of the time and the Tammerkoski rapids. Two coats of arms of Tampere have been in use: the former coat of arms was designed by Arvid von Cederwald in 1838, while the current coat of arms, created in 1960, was designed by Olof Eriksson. Changing the coat of arms was controversial, and even after the change there were occasional calls for the old coat of arms to be restored. The new coat of arms was also described in letters to the editor as Soviet-style because of its colours.

The blazon of the old coat of arms has either not survived or was never made, but the current coat of arms has been described as follows: "In the red field, a corrugated counter-bar, above which is accompanied by a piled hammer, and below a caduceus; all gold". Its colours are the same as in the coat of arms of Pirkanmaa. The hammer, which looks like the first letter of the city's name, T, symbolises Tampere's early industry, the caduceus its commercial activities, and the wavy counter-bar the Tammerkoski rapids that divide Tampere's industrial and commercial areas.
