= Alfonsine tables =

Medieval astronomical work

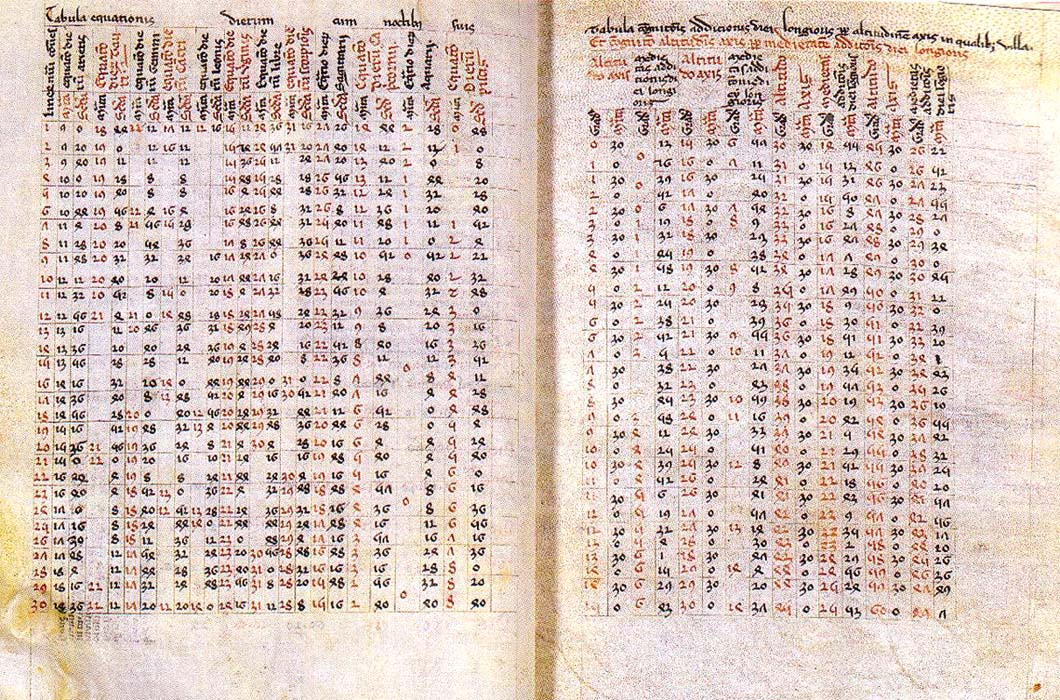
Alfonsine Tables

The Alfonsine Tables (Spanish: Tablas Alfonsíes, Latin: Tabulae Alphonsinae), sometimes spelled Alphonsine Tables, provided data for computing the position of the Sun, Moon and planets relative to the fixed stars.

The tables were named after Alfonso X of Castile, who sponsored their creation. They were compiled in Toledo, Spain, and contain astronomical data starting on June 1, 1252, the date of the coronation of the King, and furthered shaped till the beginning of the 16th century.

== Production ==
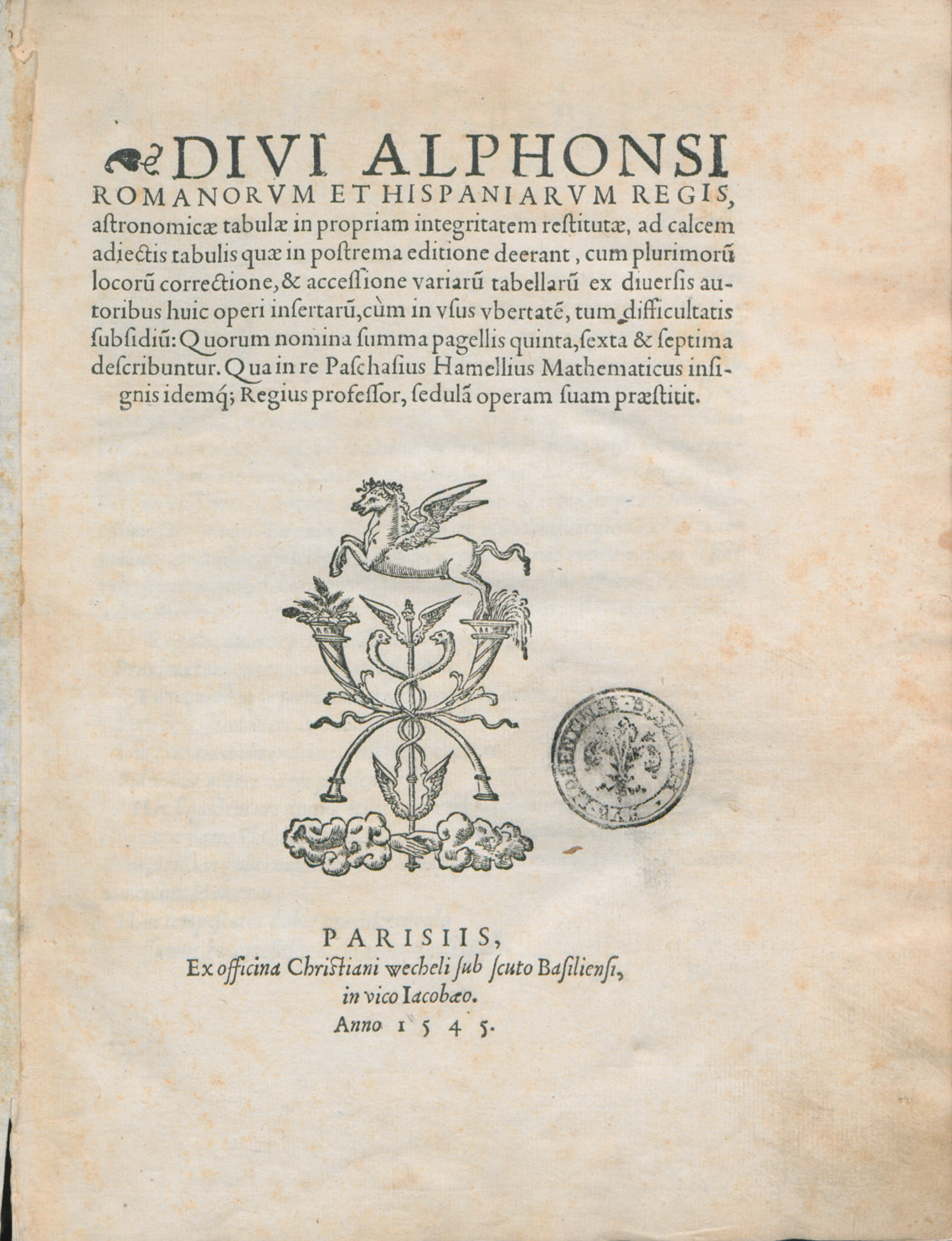
Frontispiece of the 1545 edition of the Tabulae astronomicae

The Alfonsine tables were created as an addition to the Toledan tables under Alfonso X, King of Castile and Leon.This addition created a fix for computing mean motion in order to accurately track the position of celestial bodies. Alfonso X had assembled a team of scholars, known as the Toledo School of Translators, who among other translating tasks, were asked to produce new tables that updated the Tables of Toledo. The new tables were based on earlier astronomical works and observations by Islamic astronomers, adding observations by astronomers Alfonso had gathered in Toledo, among them several Jewish scholars, like Yehuda ben Moshe and Isaac ibn Sid. He also brought Aben Raghel y Alquibicio and Aben Musio y Mohamat, from Seville, Joseph Aben Alí and Jacobo Abenvena, from Córdoba, and fifty more from Gascony and Paris.

According to the prologue of its canons, work on the Alfonsine tables began in 1263, when Judah ben Moses ha-Cohen and Isaac ben Sid began observations in Toledo (a city and municipality in Spain) in order to improve and correct the earlier Toledan Tables. The prologue states that the observations were made between 1263 and 1272. Because Isaac ben Sid was already using the new tables' solar parameters in 1277, the new royal manuscript was likely completed in the 1270s. The original manuscript, however, has not survived. The sole extant copy of the Castilian canons is in a composite manuscript at the Biblioteca Nacional de Espana, dated to the early sixteenth century.

The earliest documented reference to the Alfonsine tables in Paris is by Geoffrey of Meaux in 1320. Later, John of Murs in 1321, wrote that he had the tables, but not the canons. John of Saxony composed new canons for the Parisian version in 1327, later chosen for the first printed Parisian version in 1483.

The instructions for the Alfonsine tables were originally written in Castilian Spanish. The first printed edition of the Alfonsine tables appeared in 1483, and a second edition in 1492.

Georg Purbach used the Alfonsine tables for his book, Theoricae novae planetarum (New Theory of the Planets). Nicolaus Copernicus used the second edition in his work. One use of these and similar astronomical tables was to calculate ephemerides, which were in turn used by astrologers to cast horoscopes. Canons (explanatory texts) on the tables included those by John of Saxony and his teacher John of Lignères (fl 1320 to 1335).

== Methodology ==
The Alfonsine Tables were developed from earlier Toledan Tables, Astronomical tables compiled in eleventh century Toledo. Instead of making a completely new system, the authors of the Alfonsine tables revised and expanded on the existing tables, including updated computational practices whilst retaining much of the original framework.

The methods of Claudius Ptolemy were used to compute the Toledan tables originally. This practice was carried over towards the expansion of the Alfonsine tables keeping Ptolemy's methods: geocentric model, mathematical predictions of planetary motion, and tabular calculations rather than relying on just observation over a period time. Although a considerable amount of the original structure was maintained through the tables, Alfonsine astronomers focused on developing advanced methods of calculation and computational procedures.

The process was expressed through text, tables and diagrams designed for the astronomers with differing levels in mathematics and astronomical practices. A key feature of the Alfonsine tables was their procedures used to calculate planetary positions.Astronomers implemented a combination of mean-motion tables, radices, and sexagesimal mathematics to determine the locations of the planets on specified dates. How the tables were organized influenced calculation precision and reduced the amount of computation required by a typical user.Many numerical values were precalculated into the tables, allowing for complex calculations to be made more efficiently while maintaining table accuracy.

Later traditions continued to highlight the importance of usability and efficiency. Renditions of the table got modified to present astronomical data by formatting the data as a calendar. Creating starting dates closer to the user.This allowed for fewer calculations, and simplified table application significantly. Some variations implemented procedures that allowed users to calculate their own radices, demonstrating the growing importance of practicality for astronomers. However, not all values could be pulled directly from the tables. Interpolation was used to estimate values that fell between already existing entries in the table. Astronomers were then able to perform calculations for different geographical latitudes, making the tables practical to use in different locations. This flexibility persisted within Alfonsine computational practices among astronomers.

These dividing the year into 365 days, 5 hours, 49 minutes, 16 seconds—very close to the currently accepted figure. Copernicus's observation that his system could explain the planetary motions with no more than 34 circles has been taken to imply that a large number of additional epicycles had been subsequently introduced into the Ptolemaic system in an attempt to make it conform with observation.

== Popularity ==
The Alfonsine tables were the most popular astronomical tables in Europe and updated versions were regularly produced for three hundred years. Nicolaus Copernicus, known as the father of modern astronomy, bought a copy while at the University of Cracow, and cared about it enough to have it professionally bound with pieces of wood and leather. Alexander Bogdanov maintained that these tables formed the basis for Copernicus's development of a heliocentric understanding in astronomy. In 1551, the Prutenic Tables (or Prussian Tables) of Erasmus Reinhold's were published. These tables used the Copernican heliocentric model of the solar system. Copernicus's publication, De revolutionibus, was not easy to use and the Prutenic tables were intended to make the heliocentric model more usable by astrologers and astronomers. However, the Prutenic tables were not widely adopted outside German speaking countries and new ephemerides based on the Alfonsine tables continued to be published until the publication of Johannes Kepler's Rudolphine Tables in 1627.

== See also ==
- Literature of Alfonso X
- Toledan tables
- Zij
- Regiomontanus
