= Lewis of Caerleon =

Lewis of Caerleon (d. post 1495) was a 15th-century Welsh physician, astronomer, notable for his astronomical manuscripts and support of the Lancastrian faction in the War of the Roses. A qualified physician graduating from Cambridge University, Lewis was in the service of Elizabeth Woodville (the widow of King Edward IV) and Lady Margaret of Richmond (the mother of the future King Henry VII), and is suspected to have carried correspondences between the two political allies. His personal interests in astronomy, particularly in the calculation of eclipses, is of great historical value as some of the last surviving work from the time.

== Background ==
Originating from the south Wales town of Caerloen, Lewis acquired a Bachelor of Medicine from Cambridge University in 1465-6 and by 1481 obtained medical doctorate degree from an unknown university (speculated to have been Oxford University). Despite his lengthy career as a physician, he produced no extant writing on medical issues instead dedicating time to copying and annotating astronomical texts. In historian and churchman John Bale's 1557–59 text ‘Scriptorum illustrium majoris Britanniae...Catalogus’ (Catalogue of the Famous Writers of Great Britain), six works by Lewis are referenced. Furthermore, some 17th-century literature has claimed prominent Welsh soldier Rhys ap Thomas to have been a pupil of Lewis.

The exact date of Lewis’ birth and death is unknown, with a letter he sent to Thomas Stoke in May 1495 being the last existing evidence of his activity Lewis of Caerleon is also not to be confused with Lewis de Carleton, Bishop of Hereford.

== Political involvement ==
Lewis was a supporter of the Lancastrian faction during the English Civil War and assumed a covert political role. As a physician he served the former Queen Elizabeth Woodville, as well as Lady Margaret and her son Henry Tudor. Due to his privileged access to the Queen, Lewis is suspected to have conveyed secret messages between the women as part of the political conspiracy against King Richard III. Lewis is also considered to have played a role in orchestrating the betrothal of Henry Tutor and Elizabeth Woodville's daughter Elizabeth of York, in an effort to reinforce Henry's claim to the throne.

Lewis’ involvement with this oppositional faction is likely the cause of his arrest and imprisonment in the Tower of London in January 1484. He remained imprisoned there until at least March 1485, perhaps being released following the Battle of Bosworth in August 1485 and King Henry VII's subsequent coronation. In reward for his political service, Lewis was awarded a lifetime pension of 40 marks per year in February 1486, with an additional 20 marks per year given from November 1486. Moreover, in 1488 he was made a knight of the king's alms in Windsor Castle, an appointment reaffirmed in September 1491.

== Astronomical interests ==
Lewis of Caerleon was an avid astronomer, dedicating much of his life to annotating existing astronomical texts and making his own eclipse calculations. Lewis accurately predicted the solar eclipses of 28 May 1481 and 16 March 1485, the latter of which was calculated during his imprisoned in the Tower of London. He gifted copies of his manuscripts and eclipse tables to both Cambridge and Oxford University.

Lewis’ manuscripts are of great interest as they contain copies of works by contemporary astronomers which survive in good condition, such as work by Richard Wallingford and John Holbroke. Particularly of value is his copy of the 1441 text ‘Cum rerum motu’, which is the last surviving record of King Henry VI's horoscope. In his work, Lewis also drew upon the knowledge of Arabic astronomical sources, for example the 11th century ‘Toledan Tables’.

== Manuscript incident (2020) ==
More recently, Lewis of Caerleon made headlines when one of his remaining significant manuscripts was purchased by the British Library in August 2020. Originally sold to a foreign buyer, the manuscript was prohibited from being exported out of the UK by the intervention of Culture Secretary Caroline Dinenage, upon recommendation of the ‘Reviewing Committee on the Export of Works of Art and Objects of Cultural Interest’ (RCEWA). This manuscript, worth £300,000, was likely worked upon during Lewis’ imprisonment and is now publicly accessible on the British Library's online archive.
