= John of Montfort (astronomer) =

14th century French astronomer

John's table, from Paris, Bibliothèque nationale de France, Latin 7283

John of Montfort (Latin: Johannes de Monte Forti) was an astronomer active in France in the early 14th century. He was probably a master at the University of Paris when he was recorded in the computus (collection record) from 1329–1330 as living "with five fellows" in a house on the Rue de la Bûcherie.

In January 1332, John completed a table of lunar velocity that was sometimes included with the Parisian revision of the Alfonsine tables. He computed lunar velocity in minutes of arc per minute (sixtieth) of a day according to Ptolemy's final model of lunar motion. John's table can be found in the following manuscripts:

- Paris, Bibliothèque nationale de France, Latin 7283
- Oxford, Bodleian Library, Canon. Misc. 499, where it is anonymous
