= Erhard Ratdolt =

Bavarian printer (1442–1528)

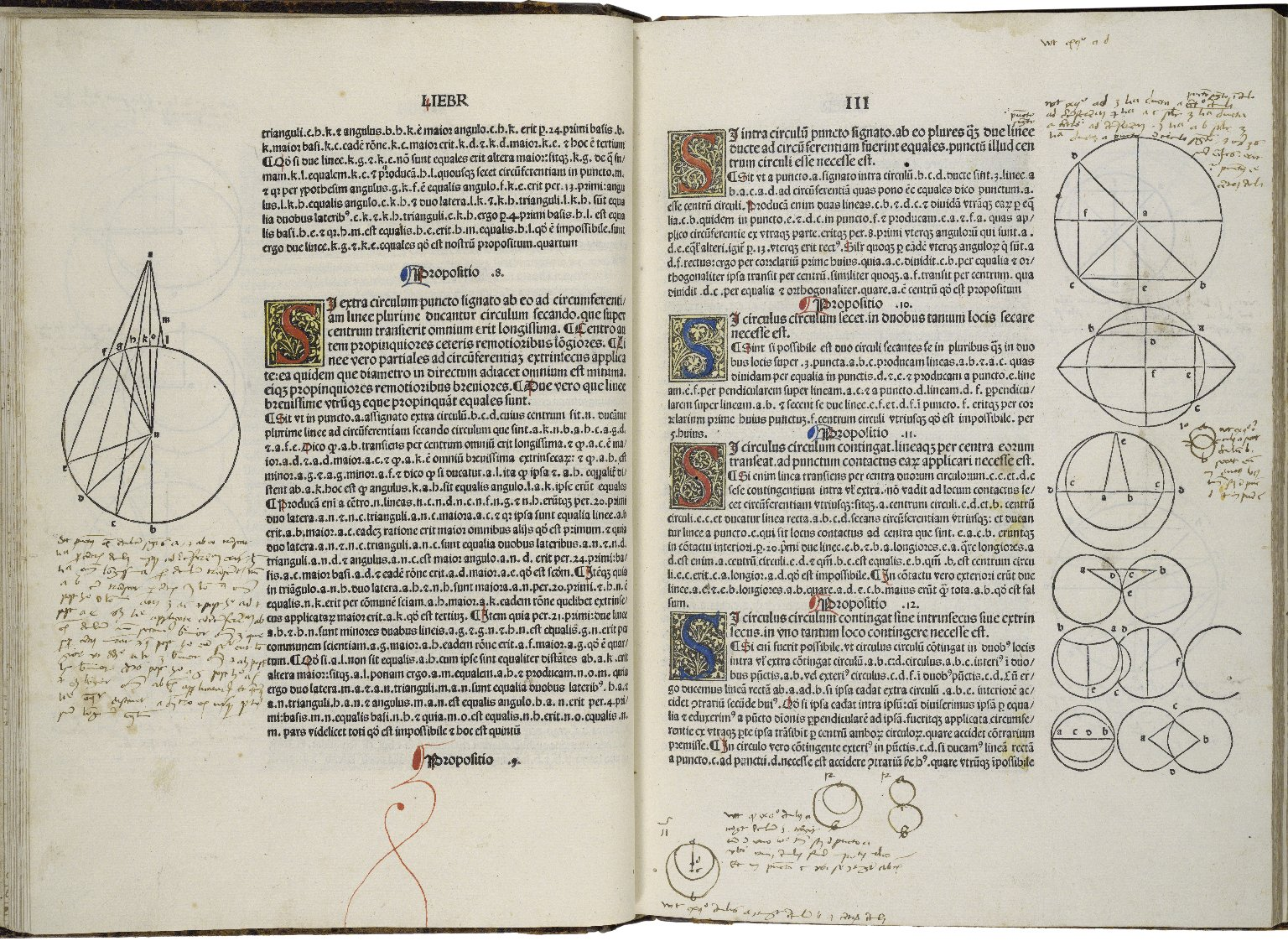
- A page with marginalia from Ratdolt's 1482 printing of Euclid's Elements
- Born: 1442
- Died: 1528 (aged 85–86)
- Occupation: printer
- Known for: introducing title pages, discovering how to print geometric diagrams
- Notable work: Calendarium Historia Romana; Euclid's Elements Poeticon astronomicon

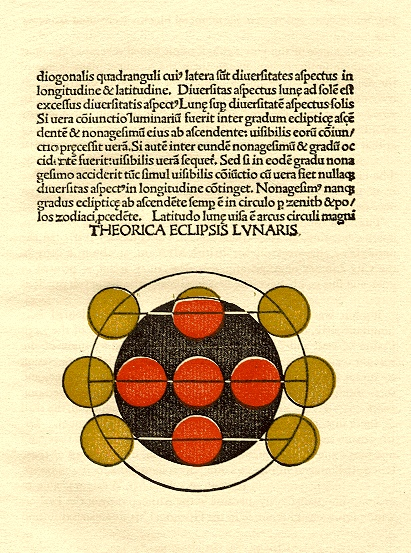
Diagram showing eclipse of the moon; woodcut, printed in three colours. From Sphaericum opusculum by Johannes de Sacro Bosco, printed by Erhard Ratdolt, Venice 1485

Erhard Ratdolt (1442–1528) was an early German printer from Augsburg. He was active as a printer in Venice from 1476 to 1486, and afterwards in Augsburg. From 1475 to 1478 he was in partnership with two other German printers.

The first book the partnership produced was the Calendarium (1476), written and previously published by Regiomontanus, which offered one of the earliest examples of a modern title page. Other noteworthy publications are the Historia Romana of Appianus (1477), and the first edition of Euclid's Elements (1482), where he solved the problem of printing geometric diagrams, the Poeticon astronomicon, also from 1482, Haly Abenragel (1485), and Alchabitius (1503). Ratdolt is also famous for having produced the first known printer's type specimen book (in this instance a broadsheet displaying the fonts with which he might print).

His innovations of layout and typography, mixing type and woodcuts, have subsequently been much admired. His graphic choices and technical solutions influenced also those of William Morris.
