= Tithonos Painter =

Ancient Greek vase painter

The Tithonos Painter (working ca 500–475 BCE) is the conventional name given to an Attic Greek red-figure vase-painter whose actual name never appeared on his works, which have been recognized in the 20th century when John Beazley identified his Late Archaic characteristic house style. Pots with decoration attributed to the Tithonos Painter are all Nolan amphorae and lekythoi. He has been characterized as "a competent but unoriginal craftsman", working under the influence of the Berlin Painter.

== Some works ==
- Amphora, Boston Museum of Fine Arts, 03.81
