= Johannes de Muris =

French scholar (c.1290–95 – 1344)

Johannes de Muris (c. 1290–1295 – 1344), or John of Murs, was a French mathematician, astronomer, and music theorist best known for treatises on the ars nova musical style, titled Ars nove musice.

== Life and career ==
For a medieval person primarily known through his scholarly writing, it is highly unusual that Johannes de Muris’ life can be traced enough to form a decently consistent biography. Born in Normandy, he is believed to have been related to Julian des Murs who was secretary to Charles V of France. The suggested birth year for Muris is based on a murder of a cleric on September 7, 1310, which Muris was allegedly a part of. Muris would have been at least 14 to assume the responsibility for the crime, suggesting his birth year to be sometime in the 1290s. He was convicted and banished to Cyprus for seven years for punishment. The aloof and haphazard movements of his life have been blamed on this early punishment.

By 1318 records indicate that Muris was living in Évreux although he was actively taking part in scholastic endeavors in Paris. An explicit of his writings indicate that he was a resident in the Collège de Sorbonne until around 1325. During this time it is believed that he travelled freely, making trips to the town of Bernay to observe the solar eclipse of 1321. However, the double monastery of Fontevraud Abbey was where he settled in March 1326. He remained associated with the institution until 1332 or 1333 when he returned to Évreux. Financial records in Muris’ own hand from 1336 indicate that he took up residence in Paris in that year. In 1342 he was one of six canons of the collegiate church in Mézières-en-Brenne. In 1344, he was invited to Avignon by Pope Clement VI to participate in the calendar reform. The final date associated to Muris is 1345 in conjunction with the reforms that took place in Avignon.

Much of his writings were finished in the early decades of his life with a major gap in activity that can be filled with astronomical observations. Though his mathematical and astronomical writings – his most comprehensive being Quadripartitum numerorum from 1343 – were well regarded, influential, and transmitted in many manuscripts, his musical writings were more widely circulated. Muris wrote five treatises on music: Notitia artis musicae (1319–21), Compendium musicae practicae (c. 1322), Musica speculativa secundum Boetium (1323), Libellus cantus mensurabilis (c. 1340), and Ars contrapuncti (post 1340) (all dates are suggested dates by U. Michaels). Many of the surviving manuscripts of these treatises are from the 15th century and of Italian origin, suggesting his wide influence both geographical and temporal.

== Sources ==
- Gushee, Lawrence (2012) [2001]. "Muris, Johannes de". Grove Music Online. Revised by C. Matthew Balensuela and Jeffrey Dean. Oxford: Oxford University Press. doi:10.1093/gmo/9781561592630.article.14237. ISBN 978-1-56159-263-0. (subscription, Wikilibrary access, or UK public library membership required)
