= 1270s =

Decade

The 1270s is the decade starting January 1, 1270, and ending December 31, 1279.

== Events ==
=== 1270 ===
==== Africa ====
====== The Eighth Crusade ======
- Before August – King Louis IX of France launches the Eighth Crusade, in an attempt to recapture the Crusader States from the Mamluk sultan Baibars; the opening engagement is a siege of Tunis.
- August 25 – King Louis IX of France dies while besieging the city of Tunis, possibly due to poor quality drinking water.
- October 30 – The siege of Tunis and the Eighth Crusade end, through an agreement between Charles I of Sicily (Louis IX's brother) and Muhammad I al-Mustansir, Khalif of Tunis.

====== Other events ======
- August 10 (10 Nehasé 1262) – Yekuno Amlak overthrows the Ethiopian Zagwe dynasty, claims the imperial throne and establishes the Solomonic Dynasty, which will last until 1974.

==== Asia ====
- In Korea, the Sambyeolcho Rebellion begins against the Goryeo dynasty, a vassal state of the Yuan dynasty.
- The ancient city of Ascalon is captured from the Crusader States, and utterly destroyed by the Mamluk sultan Baibars, who goes so far as to fill in its important harbor, leaving the site desolate, and the city never to be rebuilt.
- The city of Tabriz, in present-day Iran, is made capital of the Mongol Ilkhanate Empire (approximate date).
- The independent state of Kutch is founded, in present-day India.
- A census of the Chinese city of Hangzhou establishes that some 186,330 families reside within it, not including visitors and soldiers (Historian Jacques Gernet argues that this means a population of over 1 million inhabitants, making Hangzhou the most populous city in the world).
- December 15 – The Nizari Ismaili garrison of Gerdkuh, Persia surrender after 17 years to the Mongols.

==== Europe ====
- February 16 – Livonian Crusade - Battle of Karuse: The Grand Duchy of Lithuania defeats the Livonian Order decisively, on the frozen surface of the Baltic Sea.
- September 1 – King Stephen V of Hungary writes his walk to the antiquum castellum near Miholjanec, where the Sword of Attila has been recently discovered.
- December – Crucial aspects of the philosophy of Averroism (itself based on Aristotle's works) are banned by the Roman Catholic Church, in a condemnation enacted by papal authority at the University of Paris.
- The Summa Theologica, a work by Thomas Aquinas that is considered within the Roman Catholic Church to be the paramount expression of its theology, is completed (year uncertain).
- Witelo translates Alhazen's 200-year-old treatise on optics, Kitab al-Manazir, from Arabic into Latin, bringing the work to European academic circles for the first time.
- The Sanskrit fables known as the Panchatantra, dating from as early as 200 BCE, are translated into Latin, from a Hebrew version by John of Capua.
- Construction of the Old New Synagogue in Prague is completed.
- The cathedral on the Rock of Cashel in Ireland is completed.
- Edmund, 2nd Earl of Cornwall, donates to the Cistercian Hailes Abbey in England (his father's foundation) a phial held to contain the Blood of Christ, acquired in the Holy Roman Empire; this becomes such a magnet for pilgrimage that within 7 years the monks are able to rebuild their abbey on a magnificent scale.
- The Chronicle of Melrose is ended.

=== 1271 ===
==== By place ====
====== Europe ======
- July 2 – Peace of Pressburg: Kings Ottokar II and Stephen V sign a peace agreement at Pressburg, settling territorial claims, following the failed invasion of Hungary by Ottokar in April. In the agreement, Stephen promises not to support Ottokar's opponents in Carinthia, and Ottokar renounces the castles he and his partisans occupy in Hungary.
- August 21 – The counties of Poitou and Toulouse are absorbed into the French domains following the death of Alphonse, Count of Poitiers, son of the late King Louis VIII of France.
- Construction of the Tower of Kamyenyets (or the White Tower) in Belarus begins. Later, it becomes a frontier stronghold on the northern border of Volhynia.
- The 17-year-old Marco Polo departs from Venice with his father and uncle Niccolò and Maffeo Polo, to set off for Asia to meet the Mongolian emperor Kublai Khan (the grandson of Genghis Khan) at his court in Beijing, China. They sail across the Mediterranean Sea and travel overland, crossing Armenia, Persia and the Pamir Mountains.

====== Levant ======
- February – Mamluk forces led by Sultan Baibars continue their territorial expansion in western Syria and appear before Safita Castle (called the White Castle) built by the Knights Templar. After a heroic defense, the small garrison is advised by Grand Master Thomas Bérard to surrender. The survivors are allowed to withdraw to Tortosa.
- April 8 – Siege of Krak des Chevaliers: Mamluk forces under Baibars capture the strategically important castle Krak des Chevaliers from the Knights Hospitaller. During the siege the defenders receive a letter, supposedly from Grand Master Hugues de Revel, to surrender the castle. Under safe-conduct the Hospitallers retreat to Tripoli.
- May–June – Baibars conducts an unsuccessful siege of Tripoli, and also fails in an attempted naval invasion of Cyprus. He sends an Egyptian fleet (some 20 ships) to Limassol, while King Hugh III of Cyprus ("the Great") has left for Acre. Due to bad weather and seamanship, 11 ships run aground and the crews fall into the hands of the Cypriots.
- May 9 – English prince the Lord Edward and King Charles I of Anjou arrive in Acre, with a fleet of 30 galleys, starting Lord Edward's crusade (the Ninth) against Baibars. During this crusade they are unable to capture any territory and peace is quickly negotiated with the Mamluk Sultanate. Baibars consolidates his occupation in Syria.
- October – Abaqa Khan, Mongol ruler of the Ilkhanate, detaches some 10,000 horsemen from Anatolia to support the Lord Edward in his war against Baibars. They invade Syria and defeat Mamluk forces who protect the region around Aleppo. The Mongols plunder the cities of Maarat al-Numan and Apamea.

====== Asia ======
- September 12 – Nichiren, Japanese Buddhist priest, is arrested by a band of soldiers and nearly beheaded. This incident, known as Hosshaku Kenpon or "casting off the transient and revealing the true," is regarded as a turning point of Nichiren's teachings within the various schools, known as Nichiren Buddhism.
- December 18 – Kublai Khan renames his empire "Great Yuan" (大元; dà yuán), officially marking the start of the Yuan dynasty in China.
- The Nakhi Kingdom, of the northern Himalayan foothills, is annexed by the Yuan dynasty (approximate date).

==== By topic ====
====== Religion ======
- September 1 – Pope Gregory X succeeds the late Clement IV as the 184th pope of the Catholic Church, as the compromise candidate between French and Italian cardinals, ending a three-year conclave, the longest ever.

=== 1272 ===
==== By place ====
====== Europe ======
- February – Charles I of Anjou, king of Sicily, occupies the city of Durrës, and establishes the Angevin Kingdom of Albania. A delegation of Albanian nobles and citizens from Durrës make their way to Charles' court.
- February 21 – Charles signs a treaty and is proclaimed King of Albania. He promises to protect the nobles and to honor the privileges they have from the Byzantine Empire. The treaty declares the union between the Kingdom of Albania (Latin: Regnum Albanie) and the Kingdom of Sicily, under Charles' rule. He appoints Gazo Chinard as his vicar-general, and sends his Sicilian fleet to Achaea, to defend the principality against Byzantine attacks.
- June – Marinid forces land in Spain and ravage the countryside. They kill and capture many and plunder livestock. They also attack the castle of Vejer de la Frontera in Andalusia. On hearing the news, King Alfonso X of Castile ("the Wise") abandons his meeting with Sultan Muhammad I of Granada and orders an all-out war against Granada.
- August 6 – King Stephen V of Hungary falls ill and is taken to Csepel Island. He dies and is succeeded by his 10-year-old son Ladislaus IV ("the Cuman"), who is being held captive in the fortress of Koprivnica in northern Croatia. His mother, Queen Elizabeth, becomes regent during the minority of her son (until 1277).
- August 20 – Battle of Heiloo: Floris V, count of Holland, makes an unsuccessful attack on Frisia in an attempt to recover the body of his father, William II, who was killed (16 years ago) by the Frisians near Hoogwoud (modern Netherlands).
- November – Charles I orders his officials to take all Genoese prisoner within his territories, except for the Guelphs and to seize their property. The Sicilian fleet occupies Ajaccio on Corsica. Pope Gregory X condemns the aggressive policy of Charles and proposes that the Genoese elect Guelph officials.
- Reconquista – King Afonso III eliminates the last Moorish community in Portugal at Faro, completing the reconquest of the west of the Iberian Peninsula.

====== England ======
- The Worshipful Company of Cordwainers and Curriers are granted rights to regulate the leather trade in the City of London. The Fishmongers Company receive its first Royal Charter.
- November 16 – King Henry III of England dies at the Palace of Westminster after a 56-year reign. He is succeeded by his son Edward I, who slowly returns from the Holy Land via Gascony.

====== Levant ======
- May 22 – King Hugh III of Cyprus ("the Great") signs a peace with Sultan Baibars, Mamluk ruler of Egypt, at Caesarea. The Kingdom of Jerusalem is guaranteed for 10 years the possession of its present lands, which consists mainly of the narrow coastal plain from Acre to Sidon, together with the right to use without hindrance the pilgrim-road to Nazareth. The County of Tripoli is safeguarded by the peace treaty.
- June 16 – The Lord Edward, heir to the English throne, prevents an assassination attempt on himself at Acre. A Syrian Nizari (or Assassin) supposedly sent by Baibars penetrates into the prince's chamber and stabs him with a poisoned dagger. The wound is not fatal, but Edward is seriously ill for some months. Baibars hastens to dissociate himself from the deed by sending his congratulations on the prince's escape.
- August 18 – Nubian forces sack the Egyptian Red Sea outpost of Aydhab and raid the southern frontier city of Aswan. In return, Baibars invades the kingdom of Makuria.

==== By topic ====
====== Science ======
- In astronomy, the recording of the Alfonsine tables is completed.

=== 1273 ===
==== By place ====
====== Europe ======
- January 22 – Sultan Muhammad I (or Ibn al-Ahmar) suffers fatal injuries after falling from his horse near the city of Granada during a minor military expedition. He is succeeded by his son Muhammad II, who becomes ruler of the Emirate of Granada. Muhammad enters negotiations with King Alfonso X ("the Wise") to make peace with Castile, but he refuses to grant a truce to the Banu governors (arraeces) of Málaga and Guadix in Andalusia.
- Autumn – Sultan Muhammad II of Granada sends an embassy to the court of Alfonso X in Seville, where it is received with honour. Alfonso agrees to Granada's demands, to end his support for the Banu Ashqilula, in exchange for the promise that Muhammad becomes Alfonso's vassal. Muhammad pays him 450,000 maravedis each year in tribute and grants the Banu rebels a truce for two years.
- October 1 – Rudolf I is elected King of Germany over the rival candidate Ottokar II, king of Bohemia, ending the Great Interregnum. He is the first of many Habsburgs to hold the throne and is crowned in Aachen Cathedral, on October 24. Ottokar refuses to acknowledge Rudolf as the new ruler and is placed under the imperial ban, leading to the outbreak of war in 1276.
- The Congregatio Regni totius Sclavonie Generalis, with its decisions (statuta et constitutiones), is the oldest surviving document written by the Croatian parliament (or Sabor).

====== Middle East ======
- July – Mamluk forces under Baibars capture the last remaining stronghold of the Order of Assassins (Hashashin) sect, Al-Kahf Castle.
- August – Mongol forces surround the castle of Al-Bira. Baibars skirts around the enemy with camels and wagons. He launches a devastating attack and routes the Mongols.
- December – Followers of Persian poet and mystic Rumi establish the Mevlevi Order ("whirling dervishes") in the city of Konya (approximate date).

====== Asia ======
- March 14 – Battle of Xiangyang: Chinese forces surrender to Kublai Khan's general Aju (or Achu) after a 6-year siege. The battle is the first in which firearms are used in combat.
- In Korea, the Sambyeolcho Rebellion against the Goryeo dynasty (a vassal state of the Yuan dynasty) ends as rebel forces are defeated.

==== By topic ====
====== Art and Science ======
- The Holy Redeemer khachkar, believed to be one of the finest examples of that style of art, is carved in Haghpat (modern Armenia).

====== Economy ======
- Alfonso X creates and grants privileges to the Mesta to promote the wool industry, protecting livestock owners and their animals in the Crown of Castile.

====== Religion ======
- October 6 – Thomas Aquinas, Italian priest and theologian, writes Summa Theologica, a master work of Catholic theology, leaving it unfinished, after having a mystical experience during Mass.

=== 1274 ===
==== By place ====
====== Europe ======
- May 7 – Second Council of Lyon: Pope Gregory X convenes a council at Lyon, after Byzantine Emperor Michael VIII Palaiologos gives assurances that the Orthodox Church is prepared to reunite with Rome. The council agrees to a settlement between the Catholic Church and the Orthodox Church over several key issues – Orthodox acceptance of papal primacy and the acceptance of the Nicene Creed with the Filioque clause. Gregory approves a tithe to support efforts to liberate the Holy Land from Muslims, and reaches apparent resolution of the schism, which ultimately proves unsuccessful. All but four mendicant orders of friars are suppressed. Catholic teaching on Purgatory is defined for the first time.
- November – The Imperial Diet at Nuremberg orders that all crown estates seized since the death of Emperor Frederick II be restored to King Rudolf I. Almost all European rulers agree, with the exception of Ottokar II, king of Bohemia, who has benefited greatly by conquering or otherwise coming into possession of many of those lands.

====== England ======
- August 2 – Edward I of England finally returns from the Holy Land to be crowned king of England on August 19 at Westminster Abbey two years after his father King Henry III's death.
- September 21 – Walter de Merton, English chancellor and regent, retires from royal service, in favour of Robert Burnell, who becomes a strong ally of the Edwardian regime.
- The first main survey of the Hundred Rolls, an English census seen as a follow-up to the Domesday Book (completed in 1086), is begun; it lasts until 1275.

====== Africa ======
- Abu Yusuf Yaqub ibn Abd al-Haqq, Marinid ruler, enters peacefully into Ceuta, putting an end to some 40 years of the city's independence.

====== Asia ======
- November 4–19 – Battle of Bun'ei: Forces of the Mongol-led Yuan dynasty of China invade Japan. After conquering the Japanese settlements on Tsushima and Iki islands, Kublai Khan's fleet moves on to Japan and lands at Hakata Bay. Their landing is not unopposed: an old sea wall runs along much of the bay, and behind it are stationed the warriors of Hōjō Tokimune. The Japanese open combat with whistling arrows (kabura-ya), designed to unnerve and intimidate their foes. The Mongols use bombs against the Japanese forces and manage to break through at a few places, burning down the nearby town of Hakata (modern-day Fukuoka). The invaders are eventually repelled, and after inflicting heavy losses on the Japanese, a withdrawal is ordered. Credited to a great typhoon – called a kamikaze, or divine wind – the Mongol fleet is dashed on the rocks and destroyed. Some sources suggest that 200 warships are lost. Of the 30,000 strong invasion force, some 13,000 does not return.
- Nichiren, Japanese priest and philosopher, enters exile on Mount Minobu. He leads a widespread movement of followers in Kantō and Sado mainly through his prolific letter-writing.

==== By topic ====
====== Literature ======
- Bonvesin da la Riva, Italian poet, writes the didactic-allegoric poem Liber di Tre Scricciur ("Book of the Three Scriptures"). The text is in the Western Lombard language (similar to other Gallo-Italic languages). The poem is one of the first great literary works in Italy. It tells about Hell, the Passion of Jesus and Paradise; the plot later prefigures Dante Alighieri in his Divine Comedy (Divina Commedia).
- May 1 – In Florence, the 9-year-old Dante first sees the 8-year-old Beatrice, his lifelong muse. She appears later as one of his guides in the Divine Comedy, Paradiso and Purgatorio.

====== Religion ======
- Pope Gregory X decrees that conclaves (gatherings of the College of Cardinals where the elections of a bishop of Rome are convened) should be used for papal elections, reforming the electoral process which had taken over 3 years to elect him.
- Gregory X obtains the region of Romagna from Rudolf I, in exchange for acknowledging him as Holy Roman Emperor. With this important acquisition, the Papal States become the second-largest power block in Italy after the Kingdom of Sicily.

=== 1275 ===
==== By place ====
====== Byzantine Empire ======
- Battle of Neopatras: Emperor Michael VIII Palaiologos assembles a Byzantine expeditionary force (some 30,000 men), mostly mercenaries from Bulgaria, Serbia and the Sultanate of Rum. He places these forces under his own brother, John Palaiologos, and General Alexios Kaballarios. Michael sends them against Thessaly, and is supported by the Byzantine navy led by Admiral Alexios Doukas Philanthropenos, who is ordered to attack the Latin principalities and prevent them from aiding John I ("Angelos"), ruler of Thessaly. John is caught by surprise by the rapid advance of the Byzantine forces and is bottled up with a garrison in his capital of Neopatras, which the Byzantines proceed to lay siege. John manages to escape: he climbs down the walls of the fortress with a rope and walks through the Byzantine lines. After 3 days, John reaches Thebes, where he requests the aid of John I de la Roche, duke of Athens. He receives some 500 horsemen with whom he returns to Neopatras. Meanwhile, the Byzantine forces have been weakened, with several detachments sent off to capture other forts or plunder the region. The Byzantines panic under the sudden attack of a smaller but disciplined Latin force and breaks completely when a Cuman contingent switches sides. Despite John's attempt to rally his forces, they flee and scatter.
- Battle of Demetrias: Michael VIII Palaiologos sends a Byzantine fleet led by Alexios Philanthropenos to harass the Latin coasts. A joint Latin fleet composed of Lombard and Venetian vessels from Negroponte (Euboea) and Venetian-held Crete, is variously given at 30 to 60 ships. The Latin fleet under Admiral Guglielmo II da Verona takes the Byzantines by surprise and their attack is so effective that they almost win. Their ships, on which high wooden towers have been erected, have the advantage, and many Byzantine seamen and soldiers are killed or drowned. Just as victory seem sure, Greek reinforcements arrive, led by John I. His arrival boosts the Byzantines' morale, and John's men, ferried on board the ships by small boats, begin to replenish their casualties and turn the tide. The Latin casualties are heavy, which also include Guglielmo. By nightfall, all but two Latin ships have been captured.

====== Europe ======
- May 13 – Marinid forces led by Sultan Abu Yusuf Yaqub ibn Abd al-Haqq land in Spain upon a call from Muhammad II, ruler of Granada. With a fleet of 20 ships organized at Ceuta, some 5,000 men are transported from Alcázar Seguir to Tarifa without meeting any significant Christian opposition. The Maranids raid as far as the towns of Vejer de la Frontera and Jerez.
- June 14 – Battle of Hova: King Valdemar Birgersson of Sweden is defeated by his brother Magnus in the forest of Tiveden.
- July 22 – Magnus deposes Valdemar and is elected new king of Sweden at the Stones of Mora.
- September 8 – Battle of Écija: A Castilian army led by Nuño González de Lara is defeated by Marinid forces.
- October 21 – Battle of Martos: A Castilian army under Sancho of Aragon (archbishop of Toledo) is defeated by the Moors at Martos.
- October 27 – Floris V, count of Holland, grants the city of Amsterdam freedom from taxes (called a road toll).
- December 12 – Battle of Roccavione: Ghibelline forces defeat a Neapolitan army at Roccavione (Piedmont).

====== British Isles ======
- Spring – King Edward I of England ("Longshanks") demands a meeting with Llywelyn ap Gruffudd, prince of Wales, at Chester to pay homage, but Llywelyn refuses. In an attempt to stir up internal problems, Llywelyn seeks to marry 23-year-old Eleanor of Montfort, daughter of Simon de Montfort, but she is captured by English pirates (employed by Edward) on the journey from France to meet Llywelyn. She is held prisoner at Windsor Castle and used as a bargaining chip over the coming years in Edward's attempts to subjugate Llywelyn and Wales.
- April 22 – The first Statute of Westminster, drawn up between Parliament and Edward I, defines the legal privileges that landowners are allowed. These are based on the investigations carried out in 1274 into the landowner's rights to own their land. Establishing a series of laws into 51 chapters, including equal treatment of rich and poor, free and fair elections, and definition of Bailable and non-bailable offenses.
- September 11 – 1275 British earthquake: An earthquake strikes the south of Great Britain. The epicentre is unknown, although it may have been in the Portsmouth-Chichester area on the south coast of England or in Glamorgan, Wales.
- October 8 – Battle of Ronaldsway: Scottish forces under John de Vesci defeat the Manx people of the Isle of Man in a decisive battle, firmly establishing Scottish rule of the island.
- The first main survey of the Hundred Rolls, an English census seen as a follow-up to the Domesday Book completed in 1086, is finished; it began in 1274.

====== Africa ======
- Marinid forces take the city of Algiers, at this time independent.

====== Asia ======
- March – Mongol forces (some 200,000 men) under Bayan of the Baarin ("Hundred Eyes") defeat a Chinese army of 130,000 men led by the Song chancellor Jia Sidao on the Yangtze River. Sidao sends an emissary to Bayan to discuss a truce, but he declines to negotiate. Dowager Empress Xie Daoqing strips Sidao of his rank and titles, and he is later on her orders executed by one of his own guards as he is being sent to exile in Fujian.
- The 21-year-old Marco Polo together with his father and uncle, Niccolò and Maffeo Polo, arrives at Kublai Khan's opulent summer palace at Shangdu (or 'Xanadu'), after a 4-year journey. They present the "Great Khan" sacred oil from Jerusalem and letters from Pope Gregory X. Kublai takes Marco into his royal court and appoints him as a 'special envoy' (possibly as a tax collector).
- The mountain fortress Alamut Castle ("Eagle's Nest") is temporarily recaptured from the Mongols by a Nizari force under Shams al-Din Muhammad.
- April – The Japanese era Bun'ei ends and the Kenji era begins during the reign of the 8-year-old Emperor Go-Uda (until 1278).

==== By topic ====
====== Art and Science ======
- Jean de Meun completes the French allegorical work of fiction, Roman de la Rose, with a second section (the first section was written by Guillaume de Lorris in 1230).

====== Markets ======
- In Ghent, the first instance is recorded of emission of life annuities by a town in the Low Countries; this event confirms a trend of consolidation of local public debt in northwestern Europe, initiated in 1218 by Reims.

====== Technology ======
- The verge escapement, a simple type of escapement used in clocks, is invented (approximate date).

====== Religion ======
- August – Gregory X persuades King Alfonso X of Castile ("the Wise") to give up his claim to the title of "King of the Romans". Gregory gains support in northern Italy through Rudolf I, king of Germany.
- Ramon Llull, Spanish scholar and theologian, establishes a school in Majorca to teach Arabic to preachers, in an attempt to aid proselytizing to Moors. He also discovers diethyl ether.
- Rabban Bar Sauma, Chinese Nestorian monk, embarks on a pilgrimage from China to Jerusalem. He travels to Hotan, Kashgar, Taraz and Khorasan (modern Afghanistan).
- The era of the tosafot (medieval commentators on the Talmud) ends (it began in 1100).

=== 1276 ===
==== By place ====
====== Europe ======
- Spring
  - Sultan Abu Yusuf Yaqub ibn Abd al-Haqq and Muhammad II, ruler of Granada, agree to a truce with King Alfonso X of Castile ("the Wise") for two years. Before Abu Yusuf leaves, Muhammad's secretary addresses a poem to Abu Yusuf, expressing fear of Castile's power and appealing for Marinid's continued support. Later, Abu Yusuf lands at Alcázar Seguir on January 19. This ending the first Marinid invasion in Al-Andalus (modern Spain).
  - King Edward I of England ("Longshanks") orders the people of Bayonne in Gascony (as part of the only English possessions in France) to provide Castile with warships "to resist the Saracens by sea", but excuses himself from personal participation against the Marinid invasion in Spain because of his wars in Wales and his plan to lead a Crusade to the Holy Land.
- June – King Rudolf I of Germany declares war on his rival Ottokar II of Bohemia. After 6 months of campaigning, Ottokar surrenders all his lands (including Austria and Styria) except Bohemia and Moravia. Rudolf makes Vienna his capital, marking the beginning of the House of Habsburg, which will last until 1918.

====== Africa ======
- Battle of Dongola: Mamluk forces led by Sultan Baibars gain a decisive victory against the Kingdom of Makuria. They capture the Makurian capital of Dongola and force King David of Makuria to flee upstream on the Nile. He seeks refuge in the Kingdom of Al-Abwab, but is handed over to Baibars, who has him executed. Later, Baibars conquers Al-Maris (Lower Nubia), previously a part of Makuria, and annexes it into Egypt.

====== Asia ======
- Spring – The court of the Southern Song dynasty of China and hundreds of thousands of its citizens flee from Hangzhou to Fujian, and then Guangdong, in an effort to escape a Mongol invasion under Kublai Khan.
- June 15 – Remnants of the Chinese Song court in Fuzhou province conduct the coronation ceremony for Prince Zhao Shi to become Emperor Emperor Duanzong (until 1278).
- The mountain fortress Alamut Castle ("Eagle's Nest") is again captured by the Mongols from a Nizari force under Shams al-Din Muhammad.

====== The Americas ======
- A severe 23-year drought begins to affect the Grand Canyon area, eventually forcing the agriculture-dependent Puebloans (or Anasazi) to migrate out of the region.

==== By topic ====
====== Cities and towns ======
- March 9 – Augsburg is granted the status of a free imperial city. Later this year, Ravensburg also receives the status.

====== Culture ======
- Merton College, Oxford, is first recorded as having a collection of books, making its Library the world's oldest in continuous daily use.

====== Economy ======
- Henry of Ghent (or Henricus) becomes the last major theologian openly to consider annuities as a usurious contract. The end of the debate allows for the expansion of the budding practice of renten emission, to become a staple of public finance in northwestern Europe.

====== Religion ======
- January 10 – Pope Gregory X dies after a 4-year pontificate at Arezzo. He is succeeded by Innocent V as the 185th pope of the Catholic Church.
- June 22 – Innocent V dies after a 5-month reign at Rome. He is succeeded by Adrian V (or Hadrian) as the 186th pope of the Catholic Church.
- August 18 – Adrian V (Hadrian) dies after a 2-month reign at Viterbo. He is succeeded by John XXI as the 187th pope of Rome (until 1277).
- The foundation stone of the Minoritenkirche in Vienna is laid by Ottokar II.

=== 1277 ===
==== By place ====
====== Byzantine Empire ======
- March 19 – Byzantine–Venetian Treaty: Emperor Michael VIII Palaiologos concludes an agreement with the Republic of Venice. Stipulating a two-year truce, and renewing Venetian commercial privileges in the Byzantine Empire. Michael keeps the Venetians and their fleet from participating in the attempts of Charles I, king of Sicily, to organize an anti-Byzantine crusade, while the Venetians can retain their access to the Byzantine market.
- Summer – Uprising of Ivaylo: An uprising under Ivaylo breaks out in northeastern Bulgaria against the failure of Emperor Konstantin Tih to cope with the constant Mongol invasions which have devastated the country for years. Ivaylo confronts and defeats the plundering Mongols, and by autumn all Mongols are driven out of Bulgarian territory. In return, Konstantin gathers a small army and tries unsuccessfully to suppress the revolt but is himself killed in battle.
- Late – Battle of Pharsalus: Michael VIII sends a Byzantine expeditionary army under John Synadenos to invade Thessaly. The Byzantines are ambushed and defeated by Greek forces under John I Doukas, Latin ruler of Thessaly, near (Old) Pharsalus. During the battle, Synadenos is captured and Michael Kaballarios, commander of the Latin mercenaries, dies shortly afterward of his wounds.

====== Europe ======
- January 21 – Battle of Desio: Lombard forces under Archbishop Ottone Visconti defeat the Della Torre family troops for the rule of Milan. Later, Ottone enters the city in triumph, and imprisons Napoleone della Torre in the Castello Baradello at Como (Northern Italy).
- February – The Duke of Wrocław Henry IV Probus is kidnapped from his estates in Jelcz, and moved to Legnica by Bolesław II the Bald.
- March – Siger of Brabant, Dutch teacher and philosopher, is condemned by the French Inquisition for his advocacy of the Averroist doctrine that reason is separate from Christian faith.
- March 18 – Charles I, king of Sicily, buys the title to the Kingdom of Jerusalem from Maria of Antioch, for 1,000 bezants and an annual payment of 4,000 livres tournois.
- May 12 – Mehmet I of Karaman, Seljuk vizier, issues a firman (decree) ordering the Turkish language to be used, instead of Arabic or Persian in government offices.
- August – Marinid forces led by Sultan Abu Yusuf cross the Strait of Gibraltar and marches north, ravaging the districts of Jerez de la Frontera, Seville and Córdoba.

====== Britain ======
- November 10 – Treaty of Aberconwy: Prince Llywelyn ap Gruffudd and King Edward I of England sign a peace treaty which leaves Llywelyn only with the western part of Gwynedd.
- Roger Bacon, Franciscan friar and University of Oxford lecturer, is arrested for spreading anti-Church views; specifically, the Church's stance on Greek philosopher Galen.

====== Levant ======
- April 15 – Battle of Elbistan: A Mamluk army (some 14,000 men) under Sultan Baibars marches from Syria into the Mongol-dominated Sultanate of Rum and attacks the Mongol occupation force at Elbistan. Baibars, with at least 10,000 horsemen, defeats and overwhelms the Mongol forces. After the battle, he marches unopposed to Kayseri in the heart of Anatolia in triumph and enters the city on April 23.

====== Asia ======
- Battle of Ngasaunggyan: A Burmese army (some 80,000 men) led by King Narathihapate (or Sithu IV) invades Mongol territory in Yunnan. The invasion is repelled by the Mongol forces, who counterattack, reaching as far south as the fortress city of Kaungsin ("Gold Teeth"), which guards the Bhamo Pass in northern Myanmar. Later, the Burmese Pagan Empire begins to disintegrate after several Mongol invasions under Kublai Khan.
- Migration of the (Southern) Song dynasty: Some 50,000 citizens of the Song dynasty in China become the first recorded inhabitants of Macau, as they seek refuge from the invading armies of the Yuan dynasty. They also stay for a short period in (New) Kowloon.
- In Japan, a 20 kilometer stone wall defending the coast of Hakata Bay at Fukuoka on the island of Kyushu is completed; it is built in response to the attempted Yuan dynasty Mongol invasion of Japan in 1274.

==== By topic ====
====== Religion ======
- March 7 – Condemnation of 1277: Pope John XXI instructs Étienne Tempier, bishop of Paris, to investigate the complaints of theologians in France. By order 219 propositions of philosophical and theological doctrines such as Averroism are prohibited from discussion in the University of Paris, under a decree promulgated by Tempier.
- April – John XXI sends a papal embassy to Constantinople to force Michael VIII Palaiologos, his 18-year-old son and heir Andronikos and Patriarch John XI Bekkos to reaffirm their allegiance to the Union of Lyon in the Palace of Blachernae. Michael refuses to accept a religious union of the Greek Orthodox Church with Rome.
- May 20 – John XXI dies after an 8-month pontificate at Viterbo. He is succeeded by Nicholas III as the 188th pope of the Catholic Church (until 1280).

=== 1278 ===
==== By place ====
====== Europe ======
- May 1 – William of Villehardouin, prince of Achaea, dies. By the terms of the Treaty of Viterbo, his lands passed under the direct control of Charles I, king of Sicily. Charles appoints a bailiff to rule the Latin principality. In response, Charles swears fealty to the new pope, Nicholas III, on May 24. He promises not to attack or invade the Byzantine Empire because Nicholas has hopes to unify the Orthodox Church with the Catholic Church.
- August 5 – Reconquista: Siege of Algeciras – Castilian forces (some 30,000 men) led by King Alfonso X ("the Wise") besiege Algeciras (at this time under control of the Marinids). A fleet of 24 ships and some 80 galleys is placed in the Bay of Gibraltar to prevent the supply of the city from nearby Gibraltar. The fleet is made up of most of the members of the Order of Saint Mary of Spain, a military-religious order which is concentrated in naval warfare.
- August 26 – Battle on the Marchfeld: German-Hungarian forces (some 9,000 men) led by Kings Rudolf I of Germany in alliance with Ladislaus IV of Hungary ("the Cuman"), defeat and kill Ottokar II, ruler of Bohemia. The battle ends the power struggle between Rudolf and Ottokar over the fate of Central Europe. Rudolf's House of Habsburg will continue to rule Austria and other captured territories until the end of World War I in 1918.
- September 29 – Reconquista: Aragonese forces led by King Peter III take the Muslim stronghold of Montesa, putting an end to two years of Mudéjar rebellion. The defeated Muslims are expelled from the realm and go into exile.

====== England ======
- November 17 – King Edward I ("Longshanks") raises the penalty for coin clipping from banishment to execution. All Jews are subjected to arrest and search of their homes on suspicion of coin clipping. Some 680 Jews are imprisoned in the Tower of London, with more than 300 subsequently executed. At this time, the Jewish population is believed to have been some 3,000.

====== Levant ======
- January – Charles I is crowned King of Jerusalem, and is recognized by the kingdom's barons at Acre. He surrenders the vicariate of Tuscany to Nicholas III. His bailiff, Roger of San Severino, appoints various Frenchmen from Charles' court as his chief officers. Bohemond VII, count of Tripoli (and nominal Prince of Antioch), acknowledges Roger as lawful bailiff.

====== Asia ======
- May 8 – The 7-year-old Emperor Emperor Duanzong (or Zhao Shi) dies of illness. He is succeeded by his brother Zhao Bing who becomes the last ruler of the Song dynasty. Meanwhile, Mongol forces under the control of Mongol leader Kublai Khan ("Great Khan") draw closer to the remnants of the Song imperial court.
- November 8 – Trần Thánh Tông, second emperor of Vietnam's Trần dynasty, takes up the post of Retired Emperor, but continues for 11 years to co-rule with his son Trần Khâm.

==== By topic ====
====== Art and Culture ======
- The earliest known written copy of the Avesta, a collection of ancient sacred Persian Zoroastrian texts previously passed down orally, is produced.

====== Markets ======
- Giles of Lessines writes his De usuris. He estimates that some credit contracts need not to be usurious, as "future things are not estimated to be of such value as those collected in the instant". The prevalence of this view in the usury debate allows for the development of the financial industry in Roman Catholic Europe.

====== Religion ======
- September 8 – Pere d'Urtx, Catalan bishop of Urgell, becomes the first Episcopal Co-Prince of Andorra, when he signs the paréage, establishing joint-sovereignty over the territory with Roger-Bernard III, count of Foix.

=== 1279 ===
==== By place ====
====== Byzantine Empire ======
- July 17 – Battle of Devina: Emperor Michael VIII Palaiologos sends a Byzantine expeditionary force (some 10,000 men) to Bulgaria, to impose his ally (and son-in-law) Ivan Asen III on the throne. Tsar Ivaylo, former rebel leader (see Uprising of Ivaylo), attacks the Byzantines in the Kotel Pass, completely routing them. Many of them perish in the battle – while the rest are captured and later killed by orders from Ivaylo. Later, Michael sends another army of some 5,000 men, but this is also defeated by Ivaylo before reaching the Balkan Mountains. Without support, Ivan Asen has to flee to Constantinople and the turmoil in Bulgaria continues.

====== Europe ======
- March 5 – Battle of Aizkraukle: Lithuanian forces led by Grand Duke Traidenis defeat an army of Teutonic Knights of the Livonian Order at Aizkraukle. During the battle, the order suffers a great defeat, some 70 knights are killed, including Grand Master Ernst von Ratzeburg (or Rassburg). The Semigallians, allies of the Livonian Order, revolt but later submit to Traidenis for protection.
- July 20 – Siege of Algeciras: Castilian forces led by King Alfonso X ("the Wise") abandon the siege (begun in 1278), after their fleet (some 400 ships) is destroyed by the Marinids led by Sultan Abu Yaqub Yusuf an-Nasr. All prisoners are decapitated except the officers who are taken hostage. For the second time, the entire Castilian fleet is lost and Alfonso is forced to sign a new truce.
- August 5 – The Diet of Hungary adopts the so-called Cuman laws to regulate the social status and lifestyle of the nomadic and pagan Cumans living in the Kingdom of Hungary.
- November – Alfonso X ("the Wise") grants the cities of Medina-Sidonia and Alcalá de los Gazules to the Order of Saint Mary of Spain. He also donates the town of Morón de la Frontera to the Order of Alcántara.

====== England ======
- November – The first of the Statutes of Mortmain are passed during the reign of King Edward I ("Longshanks"), which prevents land from passing into the possession of the Church.
- The second of two main surveys of the Hundred Rolls, a census seen as a follow-up to the Domesday Book completed in 1086, is begun; it lasts until 1280.
- The Royal Mint is moved into the Tower of London. Mints outside London are reduced, with only a few local and episcopal mints continuing to operate.

====== Levant ======
- Spring – Mamluk forces led by the 19-year-old Sultan Al-Said Barakah and Qalawun ("the Thousander") invade Cilician Armenia; a revolt in Egypt while they are away force Barakah to abdicate. In August, Qalawun takes over the government in Cairo and proclaims himself sultan. He sends Solamish, youngest son of former Sultan Baibars, into exile. Meanwhile, Sunqur al-Ashqar, Mamluk viceroy of Damascus, refuses to accept Qalawun's authority and begins a rebellion in Syria.

====== Africa ======
- Abu Ishaq, uncle of the Hafsid caliph Abu Ishaq Ibrahim I, sides with the Almohad rebels of Béjaïa, and takes Tunis.

====== Asia ======
- March 19 – Battle of Yamen: Kublai Khan's Mongol Yuan fleet attacks the Chinese Song fleet (some 1,000 ships) under Admiral Zhang Shijie at Yamen. The Mongols send fireships, but this is not effective as the Song fleet is coated with fire-resistant mud. Zhang Hongfan, commander of the Mongol forces, orders the Song fleet to be cut off from its base, depriving it of its supplies. He splits the Yuan fleet into four squadrons and again attacks the Song. The ill and weakened Song soldiers are no match for the Mongols in close combat, and the chaotic environment makes battle command impossible. The chained Song ships can neither support or maneuver. Song Chancellor Lu Xiufu and Emperor Zhao Bing drown themselves rather than be taken captive. This marks the end of the Song dynasty after three centuries, Kublai Khan becomes sole emperor of China. The Mongol Empire reaches its largest extent, although it has already partially fragmented.
- April 17 – Thawun Gyi settles at Taungoo (modern-day Myanmar), and becomes the first ruler of the Toungoo dynasty (until 1317).
- October 12 – The Dai-Gohonzon, supreme object of veneration of Nichiren Shōshū Buddhism, is said to be inscribed by Nichiren Daishonin.
- A Mongol Yuan embassy, sent by Kublai Khan to Japan, is killed by orders from Hōjō Tokimune, leading to a second invasion.
- Ram Khamhaeng becomes the third king of the Phra Ruang dynasty, ruling the Sukhothai Kingdom (modern-day Thailand).
- The Chola dynasty of South India falls, due to attacks by the Hoysala Empire and Pandya kingdom.

==== By topic ====
====== Cities and Towns ======
- The town of Haapsalu in Estonia is founded and later becomes the centre of the Bishopric of Ösel–Wiek.

====== Medicine ======
- Abu Bakr al-Razi's (or Rhazes') medical writings are translated into Latin by Faraj ben Salim, some 350 years after al-Razi's death.

== Births ==
1270

- March 12 – Charles, Count of Valois, son of Philip III of France (d. 1325)
- Theodore Metochites, Byzantine statesman and author
- Michael of Cesena, Franciscan theologian (d. 1342)
- Cino da Pistoia, Italian poet (d. 1336)
- Isabella of Burgundy, Queen of Germany (d. 1323)
- Ma Zhiyuan, Chinese poet
- Namdev, Marathi saint and poet (d. 1350)
- approximate – William Wallace, Scottish patriot

1271

- March 13 – Judith of Habsburg, queen consort of Bohemia (d. 1297)
- March 14 – Stephen I, German nobleman and regent (d. 1310)
- May 25 – Shah Jalal, Indian Sufi leader and mystic (d. 1346)
- June 20 – John de Ferrers, English nobleman (d. 1312)
- September 8 – Charles Martel, king of Hungary (d. 1295)
- September 27 – Wenceslaus II, king of Poland (d. 1305)
- November 2 – Gong of Song, Chinese emperor (d. 1323)
- November 5 – Mahmud Ghazan, Mongol ruler (d. 1304)
- Blanche of Brittany, French noblewoman (d. 1327)
- Cheng Duanli, Chinese scholar and poet (d. 1345)
- Cormac MacCarthy Mor, Irish king of Desmond (d. 1359)
- Elizabeth of Aragon, queen consort of Portugal (d. 1336)
- Gerlach I, Count of Nassau, German nobleman and knight (d. 1361)
- Mikhail of Tver (Mikhail Yaroslavich), Kievan Grand Prince (d. 1318)
- Nijō Tamemichi, Japanese poet and writer (d. 1299)
- Saionji Shōshi (Eifuku Mon'in), Japanese empress consort (d. 1342)
- Sargis II Jaqeli, Georgian nobleman and prince (d. 1334)
- Sunbi Heo, wife of Chungseon of Goryeo (d. 1335)

1272

- January 14 – Hōjō Sadatoki, Japanese regent (d. 1311)
- January 31 – William Ferrers, English nobleman (d. 1235)
- February 12 – Zhao Bing, Chinese emperor (d. 1279)
- April – Joan of Acre, daughter of Edward I of England (d. 1307)
- May 10 – Bernardo Tolomei, Italian theologian (d. 1348)
- December 13 – Frederick III, king of Sicily (d. 1337)
- Badr al-Din Solamish, Mamluk ruler of Egypt (d. 1291)
- Berthold VII, Count of Henneberg-Schleusingen, German nobleman and regent (d. 1340)
- Eric Longlegs, Lord of Langeland (Erik Eriksøn), Danish nobleman (d. 1310)
- Fath al-Din ibn Sayyid, Egyptian theologian (d. 1334)
- Louis I, Count of Nevers, French nobleman and knight (d. 1322)
- Margaret, Countess of Anjou, French noblewoman (d. 1299)
- Shiwu ('Stonehouse'), Chinese poet (d. 1352)
- Approximate date
  - Amalric, Lord of Tyre, Outremer nobleman and prince (d. 1310)
  - Guy de Beauchamp, 10th Earl of Warwick, English nobleman (d. 1315)
  - Isabel Bruce, queen consort of Norway (d. 1358)
  - Otto I, Landgrave of Hesse, German nobleman (d. 1328)

1273

- January 14 – Joan I of Navarre, queen of Navarre (d. 1305)
- March 25 – Henry Percy, English nobleman and knight (d. 1314)
- July 22 – Ewostatewos, Ethiopian religious leader (d. 1352)
- November 24 – Alphonso, English prince and heir (d. 1284)
- Abulfeda, Ayyubid prince, geographer and historian (d. 1331)
- Adam de Gordon, Scottish statesman and knight (d. 1333)
- David VIII, king of Georgia (House of Bagrationi) (d. 1311)
- Geoffrey I of Vianden, Luxembourgian nobleman (d. 1310)
- Henry VII of Luxembrug, Holy Roman Emperor (d. 1313)
- Ibn Adjurrum, Marinid scholar and grammarian (d. 1323)
- Kujō Moronori, Japanese nobleman and regent (d. 1320)
- Robert Bertrand, Norman nobleman and knight (d. 1348)
- Yolande of Aragon, Spanish princess (infanta) (d. 1302)
- Min Hti King of Myanmar (d. 1374)

1274

- February 9 – Louis of Toulouse, French archbishop (d. 1297)
- April 1 – Robert Clifford, English nobleman and knight (d. 1314)
- July 11 – Robert the Bruce, king of Scotland (d. 1329)
- July 25 – John Beauchamp, English nobleman (d. 1336)
- October 4 – Rudolf I, German nobleman (d. 1319)
- October 5 – Al-Dhahabi, Syrian scholar and encyclopedist (d. 1348)
- November 24 – Catherine I, Latin empress (d. 1307)
- Eric VI, king of Denmark (House of Estridsen) (d. 1319)
- Ibn al-Jayyab, Andalusian scholar and poet (d. 1349)
- Marino Faliero (or Falier), doge of Venice (d. 1355)
- Rizzardo IV da Camino, Italian nobleman and military leader (d. 1312)
- Sancho I ("the Peaceful"), king of Majorca (d. 1324)
- Seisetsu Shōchō, Chinese Buddhist missionary (d. 1339)
- Approximate date
  - Adam Murimuth, English priest and chronicler (d. 1347)
  - Anastasia de Montfort, Italian noblewoman (d. 1345)
  - Awhadi Maraghai, Persian poet and mystic (d. 1338)
  - Nasiruddin Chiragh Dehlavi, Indian Sufi poet (d. 1337)

1275

- August 18 – Bartholomew Badlesmere, English nobleman (d. 1322)
- September 27 – John II, Duke of Brabant ("the Peaceful"), Dutch nobleman (d. 1312)
- October 20 – Chungseon of Goryeo (or Wang Jang), Korean ruler (d. 1325)
- Andrew Horn, English scholar, chamberlain and writer (d. 1328)
- Aymer de Valence, 2nd Earl of Pembroke, Anglo-French nobleman and knight (d. 1324)
- Dnyaneshwar, Indian Hindu poet, philosopher and writer (d. 1296)
- Eleanor of Brittany, Anglo-Norman Benedictine abbess (d. 1342)
- Fernando de la Cerda, Spanish nobleman and prince (d. 1322)
- Nijō Tamefuji (Fujiwara no Tamefuji), Japanese nobleman and poet (d. 1324)
- Gasan Jōseki, Japanese Sōtō Zen monk and disciple (d. 1366)
- Gerard of Lunel, French nobleman, monk and hermit (d. 1298)
- Gregory of Raska, Serbian copyist, bishop and writer (d. 1321)
- Gueraula de Codines, Spanish folk healer and occultist (d. 1340)
- Hōjō Morotoki, Japanese nobleman and regent (shikken) (d. 1311)
- Hugues de Bouville, French nobleman and chamberlain (d. 1331)
- Jón Halldórsson, Norwegian cleric, priest and bishop (d. 1339)
- Musō Soseki, Japanese Rinzai Zen monk and teacher (d. 1351)
- Peter of Zittau, Bohemian abbot, historian and writer (d. 1339)
- Takatsukasa Fuyuhira, Japanese nobleman and regent (d. 1327)
- William of Alnwick, English friar, bishop and theologian (d. 1333)

1276

- February 21 – Thomas de Multon, 1st Baron Multon of Gilsland, English nobleman (d. 1313)
- May 3 – Louis, Count of Évreux, son of Philip III of France (d. 1319)
- September 14 – Hugh de Courtenay, 1st/9th Earl of Devon, English nobleman (d. 1340)
- September 29 – Christopher II, king of Denmark (d. 1332)
- October 4 – Margaret of Brabant, queen consort of Germany (d. 1311)
- October 19 – Hisaaki, Japanese prince and shogun (d. 1328)
- Agnes of Bavaria, Margravine of Brandenburg, German noblewoman and regent (d. 1345)
- Diederik II, German count of Limburg-Hohenlimburg (d. 1364)
- Humphrey de Bohun, 4th Earl of Hereford, English nobleman and knight (d. 1322)
- Ichijō Uchisane, Japanese nobleman and regent (d. 1304)
- Margaret of Lusignan, queen consort of the Armenian Kingdom of Cilicia (d. 1296)
- Matilda of Brunswick-Lüneburg, German co-ruler (d. 1318)
- Maurice de Moravia, Earl of Strathearn (or Moray), Scottish nobleman (d. 1346)
- Najm ad-Din al-Tufi, Persian scholar and theologian (d. 1316)
- Robert of Anjou, king of Naples (House of Capet) (d. 1343)
- Thomas Dagworth, English nobleman and knight (d. 1350)
- Vakhtang III, king of Georgia (House of Bagrationi) (d. 1308)

1277

- January 7 – Kanzan Egen, Japanese monk (d. 1360)
- January 21 – Galeazzo I Visconti, Italian nobleman (d. 1328)
- March 26 – Christina Ebner, German mystic (d. 1356)
- April 17 – Michael IX Palaiologos, Byzantine emperor (d. 1320)
- Akamatsu Norimura, Japanese governor (shugo) (d. 1350)
- Bernard V, German bishop (House of Lippe) d. 1341)
- George I Šubić of Bribir, Croatian nobleman (d. 1302)
- Gerhard IV, German nobleman and knight (d. 1323)
- Ingeborg Magnusdotter Swedish princess, queen consort of Denmark (d. 1319)
- Isabella of Mar, Scottish noblewoman, wife of Robert the Bruce (d. 1296)
- Martha of Denmark, queen consort of Sweden (d. 1341)
- Meihō Sotetsu, Japanese Zen Buddhist monk (d. 1350)
- Smbat I Hetumian (or Sempad), king of Cilician Armenia (d. 1310)
- Wei Yilin, Chinese physician and surgeon (d. 1347)

1278

- January 10/11 – Rita of Armenia, Byzantine empress consort (d. 1333)
- March 11 – Mary of Woodstock, English princess, nun (d. 1332)
- May 9 – Kokan Shiren, Japanese Zen patriarch (d. 1347)
- August 26 – Safi al-Din al-Hilli, Persian poet and writer (d. 1349)
- September 8 – Theobald II, English nobleman (d. 1316)
- November 10 – Philip I, Prince of Taranto, Neapolitan prince (d. 1331)
- Christopher Seton, Scottish nobleman and knight (d. 1306)
- Constantine I (or III), co-ruler of Cilician Armenia (d. 1310)
- Ferdinand of Majorca, Aragonese prince (infante) (d. 1316)
- Hōjō Sadaaki, Japanese nobleman and regent (d. 1333)
- Jean van Hocsem, Belgian monk and historian (d. 1348)
- John de Graham, Scottish nobleman and knight (d. 1337)
- Philip I of Piedmont, Latin prince of Achaea (d. 1334)
- Thomas of Lancaster, English nobleman (d. 1322)

1279

- March 3 – Ismail I, Nasrid ruler of Granada (d. 1325)
- April 5 – Al-Nuwayri, Egyptian encyclopedist (d. 1333)
- Abu Asida Muhammad II, Hafsid ruler of Tunis (d. 1309)
- Antony Bek, English chancellor and bishop (d. 1343)
- Hōjō Hirotoki, Japanese nobleman and regent (d. 1315)
- John I, German nobleman (House of Hohenzollern) (d. 1300)
- Louis I, Duke of Bourbon ("the Lame"), French nobleman and knight (d. 1341)
- Muktabai (or Mukta), Indian religious leader (d. 1297)
- Nigel de Brus, Scottish nobleman and knight (d. 1306)
- Otto I, Polish nobleman (House of Griffin) (d. 1344)
- Zahida Abbasiyah, Abbasid poet and writer (d. 1328

== Deaths ==
1270

- January 18 – Saint Margaret of Hungary (b. 1242)
- February 23 – Saint Isabelle of France, French princess and saint (b. 1225)
- March 17 – Philip of Montfort, Lord of Tyre
- May 3 – Béla IV of Hungary (b. 1206)
- July 9 – Stephen Báncsa, Hungarian cardinal (b. c. 1205)
- July 18 – Boniface of Savoy, Archbishop of Canterbury
- August 25
  - King Louis IX of France (b. 1214)
  - Alphonso of Brienne (b. c. 1225)
- September 24 – Philip of Montfort, Lord of Castres
- December 4 – Theobald II of Navarre (Theobald V of Champagne) (b. c. 1238)
- David VII Ulu, King of Georgia (b. 1215)
- Ibn Abi Usaibia, Syrian Arab medical historian (b. 1203)
- Isaac ben Moses of Vienna, Jewish rabbi and scholar (b. 1200)
- Roger Bigod, 4th Earl of Norfolk (b. 1212)
- Uli I of Mali, second mansa of the Mali Empire

1271

- January 17 – Joan, Countess of Chiny, French noblewoman (b. 1205)
- January 28 – Isabella of Aragon, queen consort of France (b. 1248)
- February 9 – Beatrix of Andechs-Merania, German princess (b. 1210)
- March 13 – Henry of Almain (Henry of Cornwall), English nobleman (b. 1235)
- March 21 – Ibn Sab'in, Andalusian philosopher and mystic
- c. April 10 – Stephen the Posthumous, Hungarian pretender (b. 1236)
- April 17 – Isabella of France, queen consort of Navarre (b. 1241)
- July 1 – Bartholomew of Braganca, Italian friar and bishop
- July 28 – Walter de Burgh, 1st Earl of Ulster (or Bourke), Norman nobleman
- July – Arnaldo de Peralta, Aragonese archbishop and statesman
- August 21 – Alphonse, Count of Poitiers, son of Louis VIII of France (b. 1220)
- August 25 – Joan of Toulouse, French noblewoman (b. 1220)
- September 1 – Annibaldo degli Annibaldi, Italian theologian
- September 9 – Yaroslav III, Kievan Grand Prince (b. 1230)
- October or November – Marsilio Zorzi, Venetian statesman, Count of Curzola and Mèleda
- October 17 – Steinvör Sighvatsdóttir, Icelandic female poet
- October 19 – Philip Basset, English chief justiciar (b. 1185)
- November 6 or 7 – Henry of Segusio, Italian jurist and cardinal-bishop (b. 1200)
- Al-Mansur al-Hasan, Yemeni imam and politician (b. 1199)
- Constantine Palaiologos, Byzantine nobleman, half-brother of Emperor Michael VIII, co-ruler and monk (b. c.1230)
- Ghiyas-ud-din Baraq, Mongol ruler of the Chagatai Khanate
- Haji Bektash Veli, Persian philosopher and mystic (b. 1209)
- Lauretta of Saarbrücken, German noblewoman and regent
- Maria of Chernigov, Kievan princess, regent and chronicler (b. 1212)
- Richard de Grey, English nobleman, constable and knight
- Roger de Leybourne, English nobleman and High Sheriff
- Vardan Areveltsi, Armenian historian and writer (b. 1198)

1272

- January 6 – Alfonso of Molina, Leonese prince (b. 1202)
- March 14 – Enzo of Sardinia, king of Sardinia (b. 1218)
- March 17 – Go-Saga, emperor of Japan (b. 1220)
- March 18 – John FitzAlan, English nobleman (b. 1246)
- April 2 – Richard of Cornwall, English nobleman (b. 1209)
- April 27 – Zita (or Sitha), Italian maid and saint (b. 1212)
- May 15 – Thomas of Cantimpré, Flemish priest (b. 1201)
- May 20 – Guy de Bourgogne, French abbot and cardinal
- May 27 – Eric I, Duke of Schleswig (Abelsøn), Danish nobleman and knight
- June 10 – Berchtold von Falkenstein, German abbot
- c. June – James Audley (or Aldithel), English high sheriff (b. 1220)
- August 6 – Stephen V, king of Hungary (b. 1239)
- August 7 – Richard Middleton, English Lord Chancellor
- September 18 – Peter III de Brus, English nobleman
- September – Gerard of Abbeville, French monk and theologian (b. 1220)
- October 10 – Yolande of Brittany, French noblewoman
- October 27 – Hugh IV, Duke of Burgundy, French nobleman (b. 1213)
- November 16 – Henry III, king of England (b. 1207)
- November 19 – David of Augsburg, German friar and mystic
- December 14 – Berthold of Ratisbon, German monk and preacher (b. 1210)
- December 18 – Philip Türje, Hungarian archbishop (b. 1218)
- Amanieu VII, French nobleman and knight (House of Albret)
- Bartholomeus Anglicus, English monk and encyclopedist
- Guido Guerra V, Italian nobleman and politician (b. 1220)
- Maud de Prendergast, Norman-Irish noblewoman (b. 1242)
- Nikephoros Blemmydes, Byzantine theologian (b. 1197)
- William of Saint-Amour, French philosopher and writer
- Approximate date – William of Sherwood, English philosopher and logician

1273

- January 22 – Muhammad I, Nasrid ruler of Granada (b. 1195)
- January 25 – Odo of Châteauroux, French bishop (b. 1190)
- April 29 – Al-Qurtubi, Moorish scholar and writer (b. 1214)
- June 13 – Hōjō Masamura, Japanese nobleman (b. 1205)
- July 8 – Anno von Sangershausen, German Grand Master
- September 15 – Henry of Sandwich, English bishop (b. 1204)
- September 30 – Arsenios Autoreianos, Byzantine patriarch
- October 9 – Elisabeth of Bavaria, queen of Germany (b. 1227)
- October 11 – Hildebold of Wunstorf, German archbishop
- October 18 – George de Cantilupe, English nobleman
- October 23 – Adelaide of Burgundy, French noblewoman
- December 17 – Rumi, Persian scholar and mystic (b. 1207)
- Ákos, Hungarian cleric, priest, chancellor and chronicler
- Albert Suerbeer, German archbishop and prince-bishop
- Baldwin of Courtenay, emperor of the Latin Empire (b. 1217)
- George Elmacin, Egyptian historian and writer (b. 1205)
- Ottaviano degli Ubaldini, Italian bishop and cardinal (b. 1214)
- Robert de Keldeleth, Scottish monk, abbot and chancellor
- Robert Walerand, English nobleman, seneschal and judge

1274

- February 18 – Jakob Erlandsen, Danish cleric and archbishop
- February 19 – Lal Shahbaz Qalandar, Afghan Sufi poet (b. 1177)
- February 21 – Ibn Malik, Moorish grammarian and writer (b. 1205)
- March 7 – Thomas Aquinas, Italian friar and theologian (b. 1225)
- April 26 – Heinrich von Wartenberg, Swiss nobleman and abbot
- June 3 – Lawrence of St. Martin, English archdeacon and bishop
- June 26 – Nasir al-Din al-Tusi, Persian scientist and writer (b. 1201)
- July 15 – Bonaventure, Italian theologian and philosopher (b. 1221)
- July 22 – Henry I (or Henry III), king of Navarre (House of Blois)
- July 23 – Wonjong of Goryeo, Korean prince and ruler (b. 1219)
- August 4 – Robert Stitchill (or Stichel), English prior and bishop
- August 12 – Duzong (or Zhao Qi), Chinese emperor (b. 1240)
- August 15 – Robert de Sorbon, French chaplain and theologian
- September 2 – Munetaka, Japanese prince and shogun (b. 1242)
- September 26–29 – Henry I Kőszegi ("the Great"), Hungarian nobleman (b. 1210)
- October 14 – Henry, English prince and son of Edward I (b. 1268)
- November 4 – Sō Sukekuni, Japanese governor (jitodai) (b. 1207)
- November 8 – Fujiwara no Akiuji, Japanese nobleman (b. 1207)
- November 10 – Aveline de Forz, English noblewoman (b. 1259)
- November 28 – Philip of Castile, son of Ferdinand III (b. 1231)
- Beatrice of Montferrat, Italian noblewoman and regent (b. 1210)
- Gilbert of Preston, English nobleman and chief justice (b. 1209)
- Liu Bingzhong, Chinese court advisor and architect (b. 1216)
- Sadr al-Din al-Qunawi, Seljuk philosopher and writer (b. 1207)
- Approximate date
  - Arnold Fitz Thedmar, English merchant and chronicler (b. 1201)
  - William Longleg, Lord of Douglas, Scottish nobleman (b. 1220)

1275

- January 6 – Raymond of Penyafort, Spanish priest (b. 1175)
- January 26 – Ulrich von Liechtenstein, German poet (b. 1200)
- February 8 – Paio Peres Correia, Portuguese Grand Master
- February 11 – Urania of Worms, German Jewish precentress
- February 26 – Margaret of England, queen consort of Scotland (b. 1240)
- March 5 – Shi Tianze, Chinese general and politician (b. 1202)
- March 9 – Fujiwara no Chōshi, Japanese empress (b. 1218)
- March 24 – Beatrice of England, countess of Richmond (b. 1242)
- April 13 – Eleanor of England, countess of Leicester (b. 1215)
- May 6 – Marie of Brienne, Latin empress and regent (b. 1224)
- May 21 – Cecile of Baux, Savoyan noblewoman and regent
- May 29 – Sophie of Thuringia, duchess of Brabant (b. 1224)
- June 17 – Arghun Aqa the Elder, Mongol nobleman (b. 1210)
- August 15 – Lorenzo Tiepolo (or Theupolo), doge of Venice
- September 8 – Nuño González de Lara, Spanish nobleman
- September 24 – Humphrey de Bohun, 2nd Earl of Hereford, English nobleman
- October 21 – Sancho of Aragon, archbishop of Toledo (b. 1250)
- October 23 – Ferdinand de la Cerda, Spanish prince (b. 1255)
- November 23 – Margaret of Bar, French noblewoman (b. 1220)
- December 17 – Eric Birgersson, Swedish nobleman (b. 1250)
- Beatrice of Sicily, Latin empress of Constantinople (b. 1252)
- Bernard IV of Lippe, German nobleman and knight (b. 1230)
- Bohemond VI of Antioch ("the Fair"), Outremer prince and knight (b. 1237)
- Dietrich VI of Meissen, German nobleman and knight (b. 1226)
- Fujiwara no Tameie, Japanese waka poet and writer (b. 1198)
- Geoffrey of Briel (or Bruyères), Achaean nobleman (b. 1223)
- Jia Sidao, Chinese politician and Grand Chancellor (b. 1213)
- John FitzJohn, English nobleman and rebel leader (b. 1240)
- Kujō Tadaie, Japanese nobleman and chancellor (b. 1229)
- Luca Grimaldi, Genoese troubadour, politician and diplomat
- Paul Balog, Hungarian vice-chancellor and bishop (b. 1227)
- William of Luxi, priest, preacher, theologian and biblical exegete (d.o.b. unknown)
- Xueting Fuyu, Chinese Buddhist monk and abbot (b. 1203)

1276

- January 10 – Gregory X, pope of the Catholic Church (b. 1210)
- January 24 – Walram II, Count of Nassau, German nobleman (b. 1220)
- March 26 – Margaret of Holland, Countess of Henneberg, Dutch noblewoman (b. 1234)
- May 11 – Zaynaddin Ibn al-Ajami, Ayyubid scholar (b. 1195)
- June 22 – Innocent V, pope of the Catholic Church (b. 1220)
- June 27 – Henry of Antioch, Outremer nobleman (b. 1217)
- July 27 – James I ("the Conqueror"), king of Aragon (b. 1208)
- August 18 – Adrian V, pope of the Catholic Church (b. 1215)
- September 6 – Vicedomino de Vicedominis, Italian cardinal
- November 30 – Hōjō Sanetoki, Japanese nobleman (b. 1224)
- Ahmad al-Badawi, Almohad Sufi scholar and mystic (b. 1200)
- Benedict III, Hungarian priest, vice-chancellor and archbishop
- Ela Longespee, English noblewoman and co-heiress (b. 1244)
- Gerardo of Borgo San Donnino, Italian friar, scholar and writer
- Guido Guinizelli, Italian poet and founder of Dolce Stil Novo
- Louis of France, French prince and heir apparent (b. 1264)
- Hamuro Mitsutoshi, Japanese nobleman and poet (b. 1203)
- Mathilde of Saarbrücken, German noblewoman and regent
- Najm al-Din al-Qazwini al-Katibi, Persian scholar and writer
- Rolandino of Padua, Italian scholar, jurist and writer (b. 1200)
- Vasily of Kostroma, Grand Prince of Vladimir-Suzdal (b. 1241)

1277

- January/March – Philip of Sicily, king of Sardinia (House of Anjou)
- January 12 – Philippe de Toucy, French nobleman
- January 17 – Chen Wenlong, Chinese general (b. 1232)
- February 14 – Ulrich von Güttingen, German abbot
- February – Simone Paltanieri, Italian archpriest and cardinal
- April – Joachim Gutkeled, Hungarian nobleman and knight
- May 1 – Stefan Uroš I ("the Great"'), king of Serbia
- May 14 – Nicholas I of Werle, German nobleman
- May 20 – John XXI, pope of the Catholic Church
- June 20 (or May 1279) – Shams al-Din Mehmed of Karaman, Seljuk nobleman and vizier
- July 1 – Baibars (or Abu al-Futuh), Mamluk sultan
- July 14 – Humbert of Romans, French friar and writer
- August 2 – Mu'in al-Din Parwana, Seljuk statesman
- September 29 – Balian of Arsuf, Cypriot nobleman
- October 17 – Beatrice of Falkenburg, German queen consort
- October 26 – Mastino I della Scala, Italian nobleman
- October 27 – Walter de Merton, bishop of Rochester
- December 21 – Al-Nawawi, Seljuk scholar (b. 1233)
- December 13 – John I, German nobleman (b. 1242)
- Konstantin Tih, Bulgarian nobleman and ruler, killed in revolt
- Folke Johansson Ängel ("Angelus"'), Swedish archbishop
- Frederick II, German nobleman (House of Isenburg)
- Frederick of Castile, Spanish prince (infante), executed (b. 1223)
- Guo Kan, Chinese general and politician (b. 1217)
- Jacopo da Leona, Italian secretary, jurist and poet
- Licoricia of Winchester, English Jewish businesswoman, murdered
- Madog II ap Gruffydd, Lord of Dinas Bran, Welsh prince and nobleman, killed in battle
- Muhammad I al-Mustansir, Hafsid sultan and writer
- Muhaqqiq al-Hilli, Persian scholar, poet and writer
- Paolo Navigajoso, Venetian nobleman (megadux), ruler of Lemnos, killed in battle
- Savakanmaindan, Malayan ruler of Tambralinga
- Squarcino Borri (or Scarsini), Italian condottiero
- Ulrich of Strasburg, German monk and theologian
- William of Saliceto, Italian scholar and surgeon

1278

- January 3 – Ladislaus II Kán, Hungarian nobleman and knight
- January 22 – Roger de Skerning, English monk and bishop
- March 16 – William IV, German nobleman and knight (b. 1210)
- March 28 or 29 – Bertrand de Saint-Martin, French cardinal and archbishop
- May 1 – William II of Villehardouin, prince of Achaea (b. 1211)
- May 8 – Emperor Duanzong (or Zhao Shi), Chinese emperor (b. 1270)
- June 30 – Pierre de la Broce, French nobleman and councilor
- August 16 – Napoleone della Torre (or Napo), Italian nobleman
- August 26 – Ottokar II, Bohemian nobleman and king (b. 1233)
- September or October – Robert de Chauncy, English cleric, bishop and high sheriff
- November 13 – Barnim I, German nobleman (House of Griffin)
- December 26/31 – Bolesław II the Horned, Polish nobleman (House of Piast)
- December (or 1277) – Sambor II of Tczew, German nobleman, prince and knight
- Andrew, Duke of Slavonia, Hungarian nobleman and prince (House of Árpád) (b. 1268)
- Geoffrey Chauderon, Latin nobleman and Grand Constable
- Lancelot de Saint-Maard, French nobleman and marshal
- Lanxi Daolong, Chinese-born monk and calligrapher (b. 1213)
- Lý Chiêu Hoàng, Vietnamese empress consort (b. 1218)
- Martin of Opava (or Poland), Polish bishop and chronicler
- Stephen II Báncsa, Hungarian prelate and bishop (b. 1240)
- Tudur ap Ednyfed Fychan, Welsh nobleman and politician
- Ubertino Pallavicini, Italian nobleman (House of Pallavicini)

1279

- February 16 – Afonso III ("the Boulonnais"), king of Portugal (b. 1210)
- March 5 – Ernst von Ratzeburg, German knight and Grand Master
- March 16 – Joan of Dammartin, Spanish queen consort (b. 1220)
- March 19
  - Lu Xiufu (or Junshi), Chinese Grand Chancellor (b. 1236)
  - Zhao Bing, Chinese emperor (House of Zhao) (b. 1272)
- March 24 – Rinchen Gyaltsen, Tibetan imperial preceptor (b. 1238)
- April 2 – Abel Abelsøn, Danish nobleman and landowner (b. 1252)
- May 7 – Alberto da Bergamo, Italian Dominican friar (b. 1214)
- May 28 – William Wishart (or Wischard), Scottish bishop (b. 1225)
- July 15 – William Langton (or Rotherfield), English archdeacon
- July 22 – Philip of Spanheim, German archbishop and patriarch
- August 15 – Albert I, Duke of Brunswick-Lüneburg ("the Great"), German nobleman (b. 1236)
- September 3 – Étienne Tempier, French bishop and chancellor
- September 11 – Robert Kilwardby, English archbishop (b. 1215)
- September 18 – Ulrich II, Count of Württemberg, German nobleman and ruler (b. 1254)
- December 7 – Bolesław V the Chaste, Polish nobleman (b. 1226)
- December 18 – Richard of Gravesend, English priest and bishop
- Ajall Shams al-Din Omar, Persian governor and ruler (b. 1211)
- David de Lindsay, Scottish nobleman and Lord Chamberlain
- Gilla in Choimded Ó Cerbailláin (or Germanus), Irish bishop
- Li Ye (or Li Zhi), Chinese mathematician and writer (b. 1192)
- Robert de Ferrers, 6th Earl of Derby, English nobleman and landowner (b. 1239)
- Walter Giffard, English Lord Chancellor and archbishop (b. 1225)
