= 1275 =

1275 in various calendars
- Gregorian calendar: 1275; MCCLXXV
- Ab urbe condita: 2028
- Armenian calendar: 724; ԹՎ ՉԻԴ
- Assyrian calendar: 6025
- Balinese saka calendar: 1196–1197
- Bengali calendar: 681–682
- Berber calendar: 2225
- English Regnal year: 3 Edw. 1 – 4 Edw. 1
- Buddhist calendar: 1819
- Burmese calendar: 637
- Byzantine calendar: 6783–6784
- Chinese calendar: 甲戌年 (Wood Dog); 3972 or 3765 — to — 乙亥年 (Wood Pig); 3973 or 3766
- Coptic calendar: 991–992
- Discordian calendar: 2441
- Ethiopian calendar: 1267–1268
- Hebrew calendar: 5035–5036
- Hindu calendars
- Vikram Samvat: 1331–1332
- Shaka Samvat: 1196–1197
- Kali Yuga: 4375–4376
- Holocene calendar: 11275
- Igbo calendar: 275–276
- Iranian calendar: 653–654
- Islamic calendar: 673–674
- Japanese calendar: Bun'ei 12 / Kenji 1 (建治元年)
- Javanese calendar: 1185–1186
- Julian calendar: 1275; MCCLXXV
- Korean calendar: 3608
- Minguo calendar: 637 before ROC 民前637年
- Nanakshahi calendar: −193
- Thai solar calendar: 1817–1818
- Tibetan calendar: ཤིང་ཕོ་ཁྱི་ལོ་ (male Wood-Dog); 1401 or 1020 or 248 — to — ཤིང་མོ་ཕག་ལོ་ (female Wood-Boar); 1402 or 1021 or 249

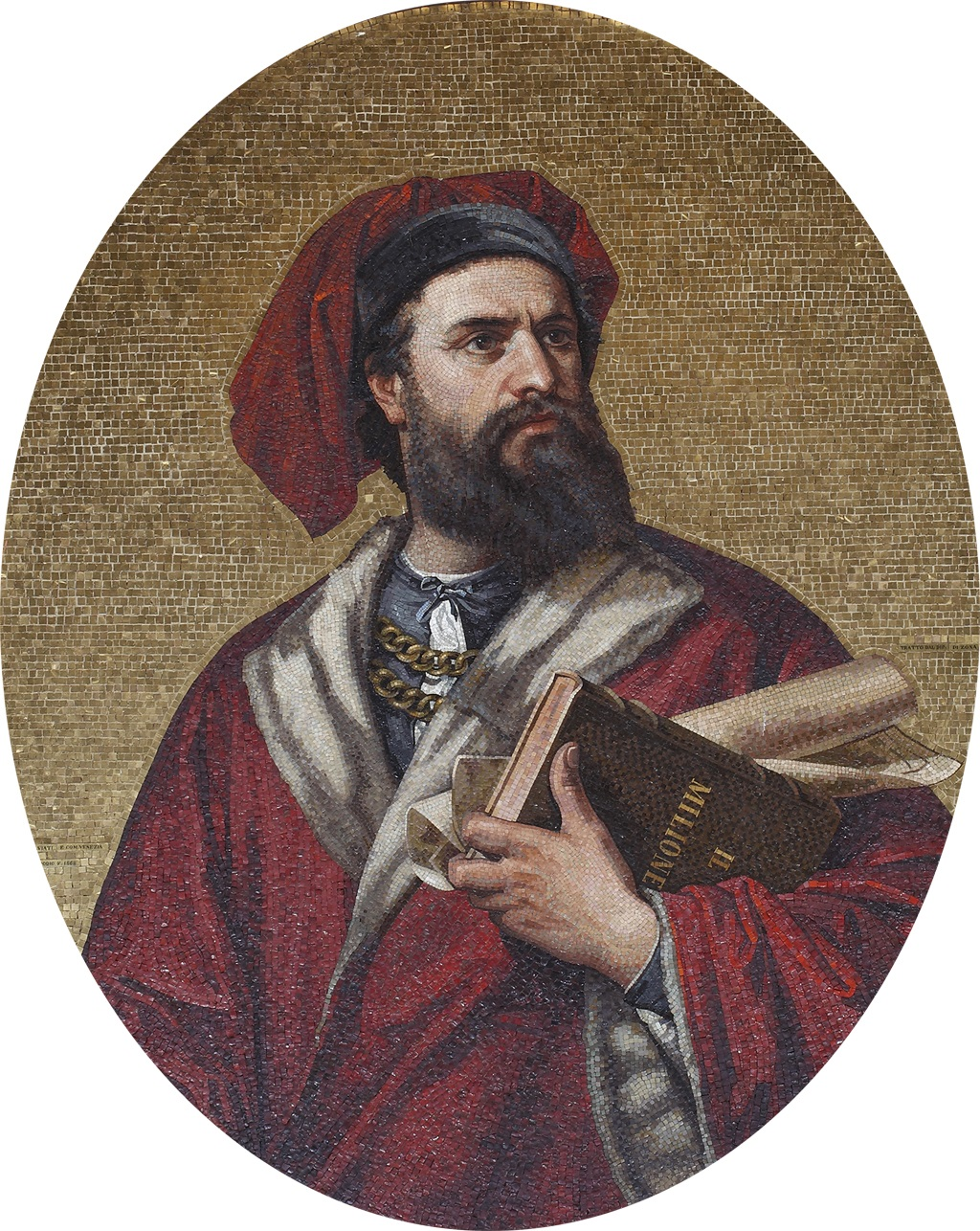
Mosaic of Marco Polo (c. 1254–1324)

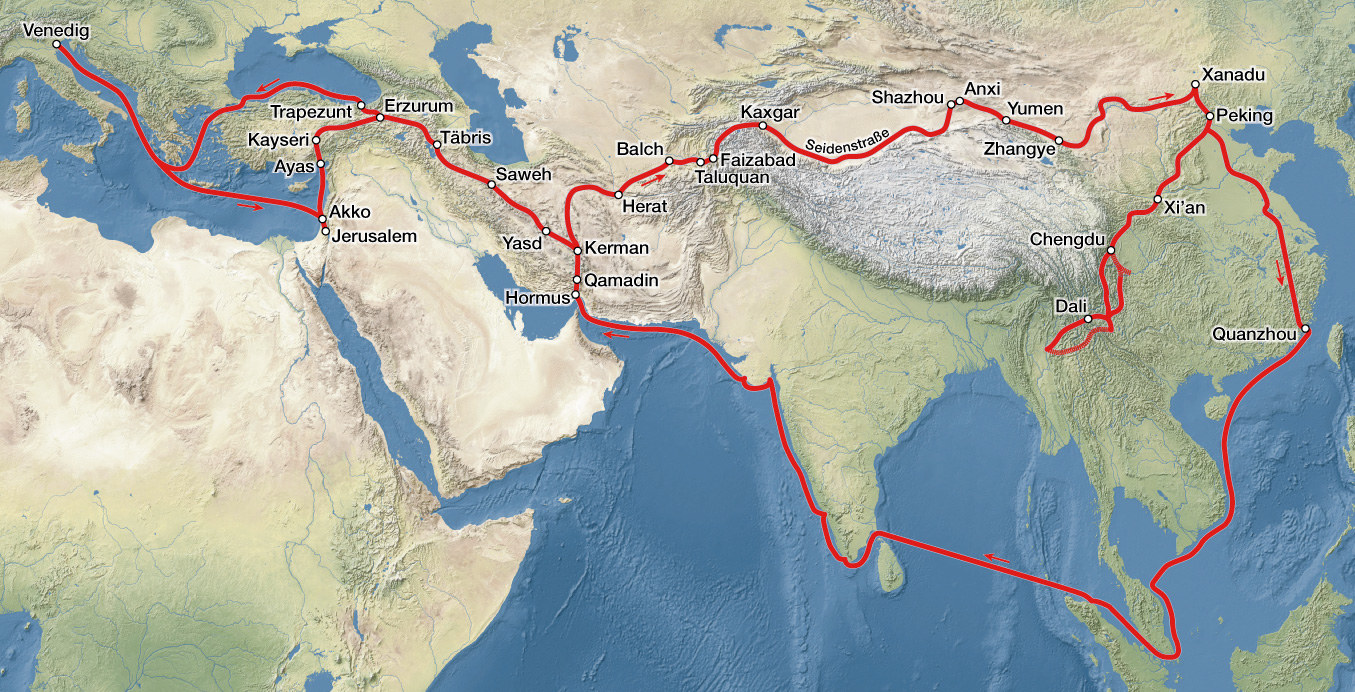
Travels of Marco Polo (1271–1295)

Year 1275 (MCCLXXV) was a common year starting on Tuesday of the Julian calendar.

== Events ==
=== By place ===
==== Byzantine Empire ====
- Battle of Neopatras: Emperor Michael VIII Palaiologos assembles a Byzantine expeditionary force (some 30,000 men), mostly mercenaries from Bulgaria, Serbia and the Sultanate of Rum. He places these forces under his own brother, John Palaiologos, and General Alexios Kaballarios. Michael sends them against Thessaly, and is supported by the Byzantine navy led by Admiral Alexios Doukas Philanthropenos, who is ordered to attack the Latin principalities and prevent them from aiding John I ("Angelos"), ruler of Thessaly. John is caught by surprise by the rapid advance of the Byzantine forces and is bottled up with a garrison in his capital of Neopatras, which the Byzantines proceed to lay siege. John manages to escape: he climbs down the walls of the fortress with a rope and walks through the Byzantine lines. After 3 days, John reaches Thebes, where he requests the aid of John I de la Roche, duke of Athens. He receives some 500 horsemen with whom he returns to Neopatras. Meanwhile, the Byzantine forces have been weakened, with several detachments sent off to capture other forts or plunder the region. The Byzantines panic under the sudden attack of a smaller but disciplined Latin force and breaks completely when a Cuman contingent switches sides. Despite John's attempt to rally his forces, they flee and scatter.
- Battle of Demetrias: Michael VIII Palaiologos sends a Byzantine fleet led by Alexios Philanthropenos to harass the Latin coasts. A joint Latin fleet composed of Lombard and Venetian vessels from Negroponte (Euboea) and Venetian-held Crete, is variously given at 30 to 60 ships. The Latin fleet under Admiral Guglielmo II da Verona takes the Byzantines by surprise and their attack is so effective that they almost win. Their ships, on which high wooden towers have been erected, have the advantage, and many Byzantine seamen and soldiers are killed or drowned. Just as victory seem sure, Greek reinforcements arrive, led by John I. His arrival boosts the Byzantines' morale, and John's men, ferried on board the ships by small boats, begin to replenish their casualties and turn the tide. The Latin casualties are heavy, which also include Guglielmo. By nightfall, all but two Latin ships have been captured.

==== Europe ====
- May 13 – Marinid forces led by Sultan Abu Yusuf Yaqub ibn Abd al-Haqq land in Spain upon a call from Muhammad II, ruler of Granada. With a fleet of 20 ships organized at Ceuta, some 5,000 men are transported from Alcázar Seguir to Tarifa without meeting any significant Christian opposition. The Maranids raid as far as the towns of Vejer de la Frontera and Jerez.
- June 14 – Battle of Hova: King Valdemar Birgersson of Sweden is defeated by his brother Magnus in the forest of Tiveden.
- July 22 – Magnus deposes Valdemar and is elected new king of Sweden at the Stones of Mora.
- September 8 – Battle of Écija: A Castilian army led by Nuño González de Lara is defeated by Marinid forces.
- October 21 – Battle of Martos: A Castilian army under Sancho of Aragon (archbishop of Toledo) is defeated by the Moors at Martos.
- October 27 – Floris V, count of Holland, grants the city of Amsterdam freedom from taxes (called a road toll).
- December 12 – Battle of Roccavione: Ghibelline forces defeat a Neapolitan army at Roccavione (Piedmont).

==== British Isles ====
- Spring – King Edward I of England ("Longshanks") demands a meeting with Llywelyn ap Gruffudd, prince of Wales, at Chester to pay homage, but Llywelyn refuses. In an attempt to stir up internal problems, Llywelyn seeks to marry 23-year-old Eleanor de Montfort, daughter of Simon de Montfort, but she is captured by English pirates (employed by Edward) on the journey from France to meet Llywelyn. She is held prisoner at Windsor Castle and used as a bargaining chip over the coming years in Edward's attempts to subjugate Llywelyn and Wales.
- April 22 – The first Statute of Westminster, drawn up between Parliament and Edward I, defines the legal privileges that landowners are allowed. These are based on the investigations carried out in 1274 into the landowner's rights to own their land. Establishing a series of laws into 51 chapters, including equal treatment of rich and poor, free and fair elections, and definition of Bailable and non-bailable offenses.
- September 11 – 1275 British earthquake: An earthquake strikes the south of Great Britain. The epicentre is unknown, although it may have been in the Portsmouth-Chichester area on the south coast of England or in Glamorgan, Wales.
- October 8 – Battle of Ronaldsway: Scottish forces under John de Vesci defeat the Manx people of the Isle of Man in a decisive battle, firmly establishing Scottish rule of the island.
- The first main survey of the Hundred Rolls, an English census seen as a follow-up to the Domesday Book completed in 1086, is finished; it began in 1274.

==== Africa ====
- Marinid forces take the city of Algiers, at this time independent.

==== Asia ====
- March – Mongol forces (some 200,000 men) under Bayan of the Baarin ("Hundred Eyes") defeat a Chinese army of 130,000 men led by the Song chancellor Jia Sidao on the Yangtze River. Sidao sends an emissary to Bayan to discuss a truce, but he declines to negotiate. Dowager Empress Xie Daoqing strips Sidao of his rank and titles, and he is later on her orders executed by one of his own guards as he is being sent to exile in Fujian.
- The 21-year-old Marco Polo together with his father and uncle, Niccolò and Maffeo Polo, arrives at Kublai Khan's opulent summer palace at Shangdu (or 'Xanadu'), after a 4-year journey. They present the "Great Khan" sacred oil from Jerusalem and letters from Pope Gregory X. Kublai takes Marco into his royal court and appoints him as a 'special envoy' (possibly as a tax collector).
- The mountain fortress Alamut Castle ("Eagle's Nest") is temporarily recaptured from the Mongols by a Nizari force under Shams al-Din Muhammad.
- April – The Japanese era Bun'ei ends and the Kenji era begins during the reign of the 8-year-old Emperor Go-Uda (until 1278).

=== By topic ===
==== Art and Science ====
- Jean de Meun completes the French allegorical work of fiction, Roman de la Rose, with a second section (the first section was written by Guillaume de Lorris in 1230).

==== Markets ====
- In Ghent, the first instance is recorded of emission of life annuities by a town in the Low Countries; this event confirms a trend of consolidation of local public debt in northwestern Europe, initiated in 1218 by Reims.

==== Technology ====
- The verge escapement, a simple type of escapement used in clocks, is invented (approximate date).

==== Religion ====
- August – Gregory X persuades King Alfonso X of Castile ("the Wise") to give up his claim to the title of "King of the Romans". Gregory gains support in northern Italy through Rudolf I, king of Germany.
- Ramon Llull, Spanish scholar and theologian, establishes a school in Majorca to teach Arabic to preachers, in an attempt to aid proselytizing to Moors. He also discovers diethyl ether.
- Rabban Bar Sauma, Chinese Nestorian monk, embarks on a pilgrimage from China to Jerusalem. He travels to Hotan, Kashgar, Taraz and Khorasan (modern Afghanistan).
- The era of the tosafot (medieval commentators on the Talmud) ends (it began in 1100).

== Births ==
- August 18 – Bartholomew Badlesmere, English nobleman (d. 1322)
- September 27 – John II, Duke of Brabant ("the Peaceful"), Dutch nobleman (d. 1312)
- October 20 – Chungseon of Goryeo (or Wang Jang), Korean ruler (d. 1325)
- Andrew Horn, English scholar, chamberlain and writer (d. 1328)
- Aymer de Valence, 2nd Earl of Pembroke, Anglo-French nobleman and knight (d. 1324)
- Dnyaneshwar, Indian Hindu poet, philosopher and writer (d. 1296)
- Eleanor of Brittany, Anglo-Norman Benedictine abbess (d. 1342)
- Fernando de la Cerda, Spanish nobleman and prince (d. 1322)
- Nijō Tamefuji (Fujiwara no Tamefuji), Japanese nobleman and poet (d. 1324)
- Gasan Jōseki, Japanese Sōtō Zen monk and disciple (d. 1366)
- Gerard of Lunel, French nobleman, monk and hermit (d. 1298)
- Gregory of Raska, Serbian copyist, bishop and writer (d. 1321)
- Gueraula de Codines, Spanish folk healer and occultist (d. 1340)
- Hōjō Morotoki, Japanese nobleman and regent (shikken) (d. 1311)
- Hugues de Bouville, French nobleman and chamberlain (d. 1331)
- Jón Halldórsson, Norwegian cleric, priest and bishop (d. 1339)
- Musō Soseki, Japanese Rinzai Zen monk and teacher (d. 1351)
- Peter of Zittau, Bohemian abbot, historian and writer (d. 1339)
- Takatsukasa Fuyuhira, Japanese nobleman and regent (d. 1327)
- William of Alnwick, English friar, bishop and theologian (d. 1333)

== Deaths ==
- January 6 – Raymond of Penyafort, Spanish priest (b. 1175)
- January 26 – Ulrich von Liechtenstein, German poet (b. 1200)
- February 8 – Paio Peres Correia, Portuguese Grand Master
- February 11 – Urania of Worms, German Jewish precentress
- February 26 – Margaret of England, queen consort of Scotland (b. 1240)
- March 5 – Shi Tianze, Chinese general and politician (b. 1202)
- March 9 – Fujiwara no Chōshi, Japanese empress (b. 1218)
- March 24 – Beatrice of England, countess of Richmond (b. 1242)
- April 13 – Eleanor of England, countess of Leicester (b. 1215)
- May 6 – Marie of Brienne, Latin empress and regent (b. 1224)
- May 21 – Cecile of Baux, Savoyan noblewoman and regent
- May 29 – Sophie of Thuringia, duchess of Brabant (b. 1224)
- June 17 – Arghun Aqa the Elder, Mongol nobleman (b. 1210)
- August 15 – Lorenzo Tiepolo (or Theupolo), doge of Venice
- September 8 – Nuño González de Lara, Spanish nobleman
- September 24 – Humphrey de Bohun, 2nd Earl of Hereford, English nobleman
- October 21 – Sancho of Aragon, archbishop of Toledo (b. 1250)
- October 23 – Ferdinand de la Cerda, Spanish prince (b. 1255)
- November 23 – Margaret of Bar, French noblewoman (b. 1220)
- December 17 – Eric Birgersson, Swedish nobleman (b. 1250)
- Beatrice of Sicily, Latin empress of Constantinople (b. 1252)
- Bernard IV of Lippe, German nobleman and knight (b. 1230)
- Bohemond VI of Antioch ("the Fair"), Outremer prince and knight (b. 1237)
- Dietrich VI of Meissen, German nobleman and knight (b. 1226)
- Fujiwara no Tameie, Japanese waka poet and writer (b. 1198)
- Geoffrey of Briel (or Bruyères), Achaean nobleman (b. 1223)
- Jia Sidao, Chinese politician and Grand Chancellor (b. 1213)
- John FitzJohn, English nobleman and rebel leader (b. 1240)
- Kujō Tadaie, Japanese nobleman and chancellor (b. 1229)
- Luca Grimaldi, Genoese troubadour, politician and diplomat
- Paul Balog, Hungarian vice-chancellor and bishop (b. 1227)
- William of Luxi, priest, preacher, theologian and biblical exegete (d.o.b. unknown)
- Xueting Fuyu, Chinese Buddhist monk and abbot (b. 1203)
