= 1276 =

1276 in various calendars
- Gregorian calendar: 1276; MCCLXXVI
- Ab urbe condita: 2029
- Armenian calendar: 725; ԹՎ ՉԻԵ
- Assyrian calendar: 6026
- Balinese saka calendar: 1197–1198
- Bengali calendar: 682–683
- Berber calendar: 2226
- English Regnal year: 4 Edw. 1 – 5 Edw. 1
- Buddhist calendar: 1820
- Burmese calendar: 638
- Byzantine calendar: 6784–6785
- Chinese calendar: 乙亥年 (Wood Pig); 3973 or 3766 — to — 丙子年 (Fire Rat); 3974 or 3767
- Coptic calendar: 992–993
- Discordian calendar: 2442
- Ethiopian calendar: 1268–1269
- Hebrew calendar: 5036–5037
- Hindu calendars
- Vikram Samvat: 1332–1333
- Shaka Samvat: 1197–1198
- Kali Yuga: 4376–4377
- Holocene calendar: 11276
- Igbo calendar: 276–277
- Iranian calendar: 654–655
- Islamic calendar: 674–675
- Japanese calendar: Kenji 2 (建治２年)
- Javanese calendar: 1186–1187
- Julian calendar: 1276; MCCLXXVI
- Korean calendar: 3609
- Minguo calendar: 636 before ROC 民前636年
- Nanakshahi calendar: −192
- Thai solar calendar: 1818–1819
- Tibetan calendar: ཤིང་མོ་ཕག་ལོ་ (female Wood-Boar); 1402 or 1021 or 249 — to — མེ་ཕོ་བྱི་བ་ལོ་ (male Fire-Rat); 1403 or 1022 or 250

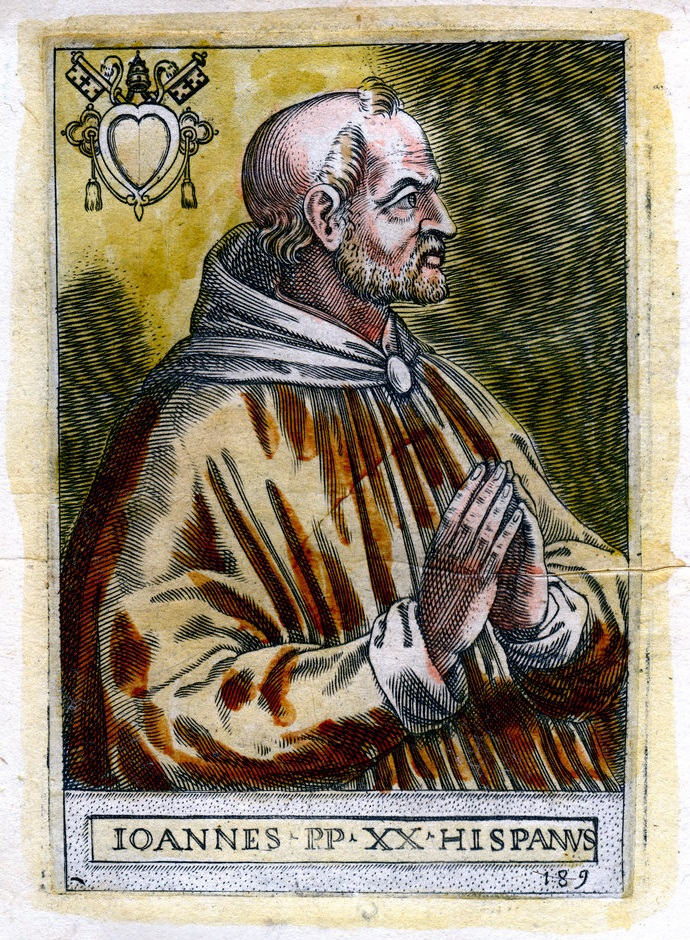
Pope John XXI (c. 1215–1277), the fourth Pope to hold office in 1276

Year 1276 (MCCLXXVI) was a leap year starting on Wednesday of the Julian calendar. It is the only year in world history to be a year of four popes.

== Events ==
=== By place ===
==== Europe ====
- Spring
  - Sultan Abu Yusuf Yaqub ibn Abd al-Haqq and Muhammad II, ruler of Granada, agree to a truce with King Alfonso X of Castile ("the Wise") for two years. Before Abu Yusuf leaves, Muhammad's secretary addresses a poem to Abu Yusuf, expressing fear of Castile's power and appealing for Marinid's continued support. Later, Abu Yusuf lands at Alcázar Seguir on January 19. This ending the first Marinid invasion in Al-Andalus (modern Spain).
  - King Edward I of England ("Longshanks") orders the people of Bayonne in Gascony (as part of the only English possessions in France) to provide Castile with warships "to resist the Saracens by sea", but excuses himself from personal participation against the Marinid invasion in Spain because of his wars in Wales and his plan to lead a Crusade to the Holy Land.
- June – King Rudolf I of Germany declares war on his rival Ottokar II of Bohemia. After 6 months of campaigning, Ottokar surrenders all his lands (including Austria and Styria) except Bohemia and Moravia. Rudolf makes Vienna his capital, marking the beginning of the House of Habsburg, which will last until 1918.

==== Africa ====
- Battle of Dongola: Mamluk forces led by Sultan Baibars gain a decisive victory against the Kingdom of Makuria. They capture the Makurian capital of Dongola and force King David of Makuria to flee upstream on the Nile. He seeks refuge in the Kingdom of Al-Abwab, but is handed over to Baibars, who has him executed. Later, Baibars conquers Al-Maris (Lower Nubia), previously a part of Makuria, and annexes it into Egypt.

==== Asia ====
- Spring – The court of the Southern Song dynasty of China and hundreds of thousands of its citizens flee from Hangzhou to Fujian, and then Guangdong, in an effort to escape a Mongol invasion under Kublai Khan.
- June 15 – Remnants of the Chinese Song court in Fuzhou province conduct the coronation ceremony for Prince Zhao Shi to become Emperor Emperor Duanzong (until 1278).
- The mountain fortress Alamut Castle ("Eagle's Nest") is again captured by the Mongols from a Nizari force under Shams al-Din Muhammad.

==== The Americas ====
- A severe 23-year drought begins to affect the Grand Canyon area, eventually forcing the agriculture-dependent Puebloans (or Anasazi) to migrate out of the region.

=== By topic ===
==== Cities and towns ====
- March 9 – Augsburg is granted the status of a free imperial city. Later this year, Ravensburg also receives the status.

==== Culture ====
- Merton College, Oxford, is first recorded as having a collection of books, making its Library the world's oldest in continuous daily use.

==== Economy ====
- Henry of Ghent (or Henricus) becomes the last major theologian openly to consider annuities as a usurious contract. The end of the debate allows for the expansion of the budding practice of renten emission, to become a staple of public finance in northwestern Europe.

==== Religion ====
- January 10 – Pope Gregory X dies after a 4-year pontificate at Arezzo. He is succeeded by Innocent V as the 185th pope of the Catholic Church.
- June 22 – Innocent V dies after a 5-month reign at Rome. He is succeeded by Adrian V (or Hadrian) as the 186th pope of the Catholic Church.
- August 18 – Adrian V (Hadrian) dies after a 2-month reign at Viterbo. He is succeeded by John XXI as the 187th pope of Rome (until 1277).
- The foundation stone of the Minoritenkirche in Vienna is laid by Ottokar II.

== Births ==
- February 21 – Thomas de Multon, 1st Baron Multon of Gilsland, English nobleman (d. 1313)
- May 3 – Louis, Count of Évreux, son of Philip III of France (d. 1319)
- September 14 – Hugh de Courtenay, 1st/9th Earl of Devon, English nobleman (d. 1340)
- September 29 – Christopher II, king of Denmark (d. 1332)
- October 4 – Margaret of Brabant, queen consort of Germany (d. 1311)
- October 19 – Hisaaki, Japanese prince and shogun (d. 1328)
- Agnes of Bavaria, Margravine of Brandenburg, German noblewoman and regent (d. 1345)
- Diederik II, German count of Limburg-Hohenlimburg (d. 1364)
- Humphrey de Bohun, 4th Earl of Hereford, English nobleman and knight (d. 1322)
- Ichijō Uchisane, Japanese nobleman and regent (d. 1304)
- Margaret of Lusignan, queen consort of the Armenian Kingdom of Cilicia (d. 1296)
- Matilda of Brunswick-Lüneburg, German co-ruler (d. 1318)
- Maurice de Moravia, Earl of Strathearn (or Moray), Scottish nobleman (d. 1346)
- Najm ad-Din al-Tufi, Persian scholar and theologian (d. 1316)
- Robert of Anjou, king of Naples (House of Capet) (d. 1343)
- Thomas Dagworth, English nobleman and knight (d. 1350)
- Vakhtang III, king of Georgia (House of Bagrationi) (d. 1308)

== Deaths ==
- January 10 – Gregory X, pope of the Catholic Church (b. 1210)
- January 24 – Walram II, Count of Nassau, German nobleman (b. 1220)
- March 26 – Margaret of Holland, Countess of Henneberg, Dutch noblewoman (b. 1234)
- May 11 – Zaynaddin Ibn al-Ajami, Ayyubid scholar (b. 1195)
- June 22 – Innocent V, pope of the Catholic Church (b. 1220)
- June 27 – Henry of Antioch, Outremer nobleman (b. 1217)
- July 27 – James I ("the Conqueror"), king of Aragon (b. 1208)
- August 18 – Adrian V, pope of the Catholic Church (b. 1215)
- September 6 – Vicedomino de Vicedominis, Italian cardinal
- November 30 – Hōjō Sanetoki, Japanese nobleman (b. 1224)
- Ahmad al-Badawi, Almohad Sufi scholar and mystic (b. 1200)
- Benedict III, Hungarian priest, vice-chancellor and archbishop
- Ela Longespee, English noblewoman and co-heiress (b. 1244)
- Gerardo of Borgo San Donnino, Italian friar, scholar and writer
- Guido Guinizelli, Italian poet and founder of Dolce Stil Novo
- Louis of France, French prince and heir apparent (b. 1264)
- Hamuro Mitsutoshi, Japanese nobleman and poet (b. 1203)
- Mathilde of Saarbrücken, German noblewoman and regent
- Najm al-Din al-Qazwini al-Katibi, Persian scholar and writer
- Rolandino of Padua, Italian scholar, jurist and writer (b. 1200)
- Vasily of Kostroma, Grand Prince of Vladimir-Suzdal (b. 1241)
