= 1203 =

1203 in various calendars
- Gregorian calendar: 1203; MCCIII
- Ab urbe condita: 1956
- Armenian calendar: 652; ԹՎ ՈԾԲ
- Assyrian calendar: 5953
- Balinese saka calendar: 1124–1125
- Bengali calendar: 609–610
- Berber calendar: 2153
- English Regnal year: 4 Joh. 1 – 5 Joh. 1
- Buddhist calendar: 1747
- Burmese calendar: 565
- Byzantine calendar: 6711–6712
- Chinese calendar: 壬戌年 (Water Dog); 3900 or 3693 — to — 癸亥年 (Water Pig); 3901 or 3694
- Coptic calendar: 919–920
- Discordian calendar: 2369
- Ethiopian calendar: 1195–1196
- Hebrew calendar: 4963–4964
- Hindu calendars
- Vikram Samvat: 1259–1260
- Shaka Samvat: 1124–1125
- Kali Yuga: 4303–4304
- Holocene calendar: 11203
- Igbo calendar: 203–204
- Iranian calendar: 581–582
- Islamic calendar: 599–600
- Japanese calendar: Kennin 3 (建仁３年)
- Javanese calendar: 1111–1112
- Julian calendar: 1203; MCCIII
- Korean calendar: 3536
- Minguo calendar: 709 before ROC 民前709年
- Nanakshahi calendar: −265
- Thai solar calendar: 1745–1746
- Tibetan calendar: ཆུ་ཕོ་ཁྱི་ལོ་ (male Water-Dog); 1329 or 948 or 176 — to — ཆུ་མོ་ཕག་ལོ་ (female Water-Boar); 1330 or 949 or 177

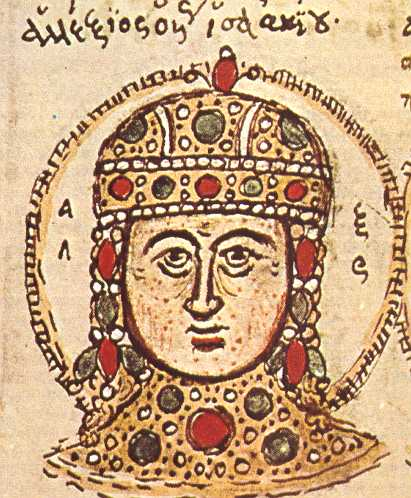
Portrait of Alexios IV (c. 1182–1204)

Year 1203 (MCCIII) was a common year starting on Wednesday of the Julian calendar. It was also the first year to have all digits different from each other since 1098.

== Events ==
=== By place ===
==== Fourth Crusade ====
- April 20 – The Crusader army evacuates Zara (modern Zadar) and sets sail to Corfu; Boniface of Montferrat and Doge Enrico Dandolo stay behind to await Prince Alexios Angelos. After a brief pause at Durrës (modern Albania), the fleet reaches Corfu. Meanwhile, news of its approach (through spies) has reached Emperor Alexios III Angelos at Constantinople. He gives order to strengthen the city walls and the fortifications.
- May – June – The Crusader fleet rounds Greece and stops at Negroponte (modern-day Halkis), where the local authorities submit to Alexios Angelos. Encouraged by this, the Crusader leaders send him and several ships to extend his authority over the neighboring island of Andros. Mid-June, the Crusader fleet sails from Greece to Abydos, where it enters the Dardanelles.
- June 23 – The Crusader fleet comes within sight of Constantinople, and enters the Bosporus. The Byzantine capital is defended by a garrison of 15,000 soldiers (including 5,000 men of the Varangian Guard), and a fleet of 20 galleys. On June 26, the Byzantine troops skirmish with the Crusader forces, who attack, without success, the cities of Chalcedon and Chrysopolis.
- July 2 – Crusader leaders sail close to the city's walls in order to display the young Alexios Angelos, where they call upon the Byzantines to rise up in his favour. After rowing back and forth for a while, receiving insults and missiles, the attempt is abandoned. The Crusader leadership decides to land an invasion force north of Galata – using prevailing currents and winds.
- July 5 – The Crusader fleet disembarks their horse transports, and barrels down upon the Byzantine defenders in a full cavalry charge. The Byzantines flee after brief combat, and retreat to the Tower of Galata, where they fortify themselves. After a bitter struggle, the Crusaders capture the tower and break the floating chain, and allow their fleet to enter the Golden Horn.
- Siege of Constantinople: The Crusaders, led by Boniface of Montferrat, capture Constantinople, in support of the deposed Emperor Isaac II and his son Alexios Angelos. This marks the main outcome of the Fourth Crusade.
  - July 11 – The Crusaders take positions opposite the Palace of Blachernae on the northwest corner of the city. Their first attempts are repulsed, but on July 17 the Venetians take a section of the wall of about 25 towers, while the Varangian Guard holds off the Crusaders on the land wall, inflicting heavy casualties. The Venetians set fire to the buildings inside the Golden Horn walls, and then abandon the occupied fortifications.
  - July 17–18 – Alexios III tries to counterattack from the Gate of St. Romanus but retreats without a fight. Embarrassed, he prefers to escape and abandon his subjects, fleeing with the imperial treasure to Develtos (a fortified town on the Gulf of Burgas) in Thrace. Meanwhile, the Byzantine aristocracy restores the ex-emperor Isaac II to the imperial throne. On August 1, Alexios Angelos is crowned co-emperor as Alexios IV.
- August – Alexios IV announces new taxes and enrages the Orthodox Church by confiscating large quantities of Byzantine icons, many centuries old, and melts them down to produce enough silver to pay the massive debt to the Venetians. A riot breaks out in Constantinople – during which the Byzantine populace loots and burns the homes of Italian residents in the city.
- August 31 – The Venetians rally a rabble of soldiers and storm through the walls, attacking the Mitation Mosque which results in extensive fires in Constantinople. Finally, they are fought off by the Byzantines and Muslims standing side by side. It becomes one of the most extensive urban conflagrations in European History and renders some 100,000 people homeless.
- August–October – Alexios IV leads a Crusader expedition (some 6,000 men) to extend his central-government control, against the fugitive Alexios III in Thrace. Meanwhile, a Crusader fleet operates in the Sea of Marmara in support of the Thracian campaign. The Crusaders seize several towns, including Adrianople, while Alexios escapes and withdraws to Macedonia.

==== Europe ====
- Spring – King Philip II of France invades Normandy and attacks a number of castles in the surrounding region. In April, John, King of England loses the support of his French vassals who desert him. Philip enters Rouen, leading to the eventual Treaty of Paris (1259) and unification of Normandy and France.
- At Rouen, William de Braose, an English nobleman, becomes the guardian of the imprisoned 16-year-old Arthur of Brittany, designated heir to the throne of England – who is not known to be alive after April and is probably murdered by or at the orders of his uncle, King John.
- August – Siege of Château Gaillard: French forces under Philip II begin the siege at Château Gaillard as part of a campaign to reconquer the continental properties of King John of England. During the winter of 1203/1204, the English under William Marshal attempt to relieve the castle.
- October – Brothers' Quarrel: Emeric, King of Hungary captures his rebellious brother Duke Andrew without resistance following their third confrontation in recent years.
- December 6 – King John abandons the lands that have been held by the Dukes of Normandy for over a hundred years and returns to England. Only two castles hold out against the French forces – they are Chinon Castle, controlled by Hubert de Burgh and Loches Castle.
- The Oeselians ravage Danish Scania. The returning pirates later skirmish with the German settlers of Riga, near Visby in Gotland.

==== Levant ====
- Summer – On orders of Al-Adil I, sultan of Egypt, Muslim ships attack Crusader vessels off Cyprus. Ships from Acre retaliate this action, by capturing six Muslim ships off Acre. King Aimery of Jerusalem declares the truce void between Al-Aldil and the Crusaders, and raids Muslim territory in northern Palestine. Al-Adil responds by taking his army to the outskirts of Acre – but does not launch an assault and retires afterward. A plague breaks out in Acre and half the newly arrived Crusader army dies.

==== East Asia ====
- Early – Battle of Khalakhaljid Sands: Temüjin, khan of the Mongol tribe and the future Genghis Khan, is comprehensively defeated by the forces of Toghrul, khan of the Kereit.
- Midyear – The Baljuna Covenant, an oath of mutual fidelity, is sworn by Temüjin and a small group of companions.
- Late – In a 3-day battle at the Jeje'er Heights on the lower Kherlen River, Temüjin defeats the Kereit and Toghrul is killed.

==== Japan ====
- Minamoto no Sanetomo becomes the third shogun of the Kamakura shogunate. During his reign, Sanetomo is a puppet ruler for his mother Hōjō Masako who uses him as a pawn in her war with her father Hōjō Tokimasa.

=== By topic ===
==== Economy ====
- First evidence that the Temple in London is extending loans to John, King of England. The sums remain small, but are often used for critical operations, such as the ransoming of the king's soldiers captured by the French.

==== Religion ====
- April 8 – Congress of Bilino Polje: Ban Kulin, ruler of Bosnia, officially declares his allegiance to the Roman Catholic Church and denounces heresy.
- Ragnall mac Somairle, a Scottish nobleman, invites Benedictine monks to establish the abbey of Iona.
- The Temple of Nataraja is completed, at Chidambaram in India.

== Births ==
- January 10 – Abu Shama, Arab historian and writer (d. 1267)
- Abu Zakariya Yahya, ruler of the Hafsid Sultanate (d. 1249)
- Bi Bi Monajemeh Nishaburi, Persian astronomer (d. 1280)
- Cecilia Cesarini, Italian Dominican nun and saint (d. 1290)
- Donnchadh, Scottish ruler (mormaer) of Mar (d. 1244)
- Eva Marshal, Cambro-Norman noblewoman (d. 1246)
- Hamuro Mitsutoshi, Japanese waka poet (d. 1276)
- Hōjō Tokiuji, Japanese nobleman and spy (d. 1230)
- Ibn Abi Usaybi'a, Syrian physician and historian (d. 1270)
- Kujō Motoie, Japanese nobleman and poet (d. 1280)
- Mindaugas (or Mendog), king of Lithuania (d. 1263)
- Peter II ("the Little Charlemagne"), count of Savoy (d. 1268)
- Sengaku, Japanese Buddhist monk and writer (d. 1273)
- Vasilko Romanovich, Grand Prince of Kiev (d. 1269)
- Xueting Fuyu, Chinese Zen Buddhist abbot (d. 1275)
- Zakariya al-Qazwini, Persian astronomer (d. 1283)

== Deaths ==
- January – Sayyida Zumurrud Khatun, umm al-walad (mother) of the Abbasid caliph
- January 12 – Martin of León, Spanish priest (b. 1130)
- January 21 – Agnes II, abbess of Quedlinburg in Saxony (b. 1139)
- March – Hedwig, margravine of Meissen (b. 1140)
- April 6 – William of Æbelholt, French churchman (b. 1125)
- May – Dafydd ab Owain Gwynedd, Welsh prince
- July 12 – Isabel de Warenne, English noblewoman
- July 21 – Harvey I of Léon, Breton nobleman (b. 1153)
- September 11 – Stephen of Tournai, French bishop (b. 1128)
- October 8
  - Hiki Yoshikazu, Japanese warrior and nobleman
  - Minamoto no Ichiman, Japanese nobleman (b. 1198)
- November 4 – Dirk VII, Dutch nobleman and knight
- November 30 – Abd al-Ghani al-Maqdisi, Arab scholar and jurist (b. 1146)
- unknown dates
  - 'Abdallah ibn Ghaniya, Almoravid ruler of Mallorca
  - Alexios Palaiologos, Byzantine heir apparent
  - Gille Críst, Scottish nobleman and knight
  - William de Stuteville, English nobleman
- probable
  - Eudokia Komnene, Byzantine noblewoman
  - Siraj al-Din al-Sajawandi, Persian scholar
  - Toghrul (or Wang Khan), Mongol leader
