= Heinrich von Wartenberg =

Heinrich von Wartenberg (died 26 April 1274 presumably in Arbon) was anti-abbot of the Abbey of Saint Gall from 1272 until 1274.

Heinrich was a descendant of the noble family of the Wartenbergs from the area of Baar on the upper Danube. Initially, he was a priest on Reichenau island. He moved to Saint Gall before Abbot Berchtold, his relative, died. On 14 June 1272, he was elected abbot by the convent of the abbey. However, the ministeriales concurrently elected Ulrich von Güttingen instead. Ulrich found stronger support, which led to Heinrich fleeing the abbey. Bishop Eberhard of Constance gave him refuge in Arbon and Pope Gregory X sent Ludwig of Dillingen as an arbitrator to settle the emerging dispute. While the feud of the two abbots was already reaching destructive proportions, Heinrich died unexpectedly on 26 April 1274. He is buried in the Galluskapelle in Arbon, where Gallus, founder of Saint Gall, had last been active.
