= Wei Yilin =

Yuan dynasty physician (c. 1277–1347)

Wei Yilin (Chinese: 危亦林; pinyin: Wēi Yìlín; c. 1277–1347) was a Chinese physician and surgeon who lived during the Mongol-led Yuan dynasty of China. He compiled the medical treatise Shiyi Dexiaofang and invented a suspension method for reducing dislocated joints and fractures.

== History ==
Wei Yilin was born in a family of physicians. His great grandfather was a prominent physician, and his father, uncle, grandfather, and great-uncle were all trained in medicine. Wei became a scholar and joined the Imperial Academy of Medicine. He worked as an instructor for a medical school in Nanfeng, Jiangxi.

Wei is best known as an orthopedic physician for compiling the medical treatise Shiyi Dexiaofang (世醫得效方), or Efficacious Remedies of the Physicians. The book describes treatments for joint dislocations and bone fractures. Wei used anesthetics for his surgical procedures. He pioneered a new technique for reducing dislocated joints using a suspension method. The historian George Lane compares it to a similar technique adopted by Western physicians in 1927.

Wei Yilin's preface for the Shiyi Dexiaofang was written in 1337. In 1339, the treatise was printed by the Office of the Inspector of Public Health in Jiangxi and sent to the National Medical College. The book was attached with a preface by the Imperial College of Medicine and a list naming twenty four medical authorities from the college. The likely purpose of the list was to give credence to the text. The National Medical College approved the book for publication.

The treatise was well-received, and Jianning Circuit began printing the book to meet popular demand. The Jianning edition of the compilation included a preface by Chen Zhi (陳志), who was the supervisor of the circuit's Office of the Inspector of Public Health. One copy of the Shiyi Dexiaofang is owned by the Library of Congress in the United States.
