= Giles of Lessines =

Dominican philosopher (c.1230–c.1304)[

Giles of Lessines OP (c. 1230 – c. 1304) was a thirteenth-century Dominican scholastic philosopher, a pupil of Thomas Aquinas. He was also strongly influenced by Albertus Magnus. He was an early defender of Thomism.

He is also known as an early scientist, and for economic theory, writing on usury and market prices.

== Works ==
Among the works authored by Giles are:

- Commentarium in libros I et II Sententiarum
- De concordia temporum
- De essentia, motu et significatione cometarum
- De geometria
- Epistula Alberto Magno missa
- Summa de temporibus
- De unitate formae
- De usuris
- Quaestiones theologicae
