= Zahida Abbasiyah =

Zahida al-Abbasiyah
- زاهدة بنت عبدالله بن مبارك بن المستعصم
- Born: Zahida bint Abdullah bin Mubarak bin al-Musta'sim; 1279; Baghdad
- Died: 1328 (aged 48–49); Zarud
- Other name: Sitt al-Muluk
- Known for: Philanthropy, poetry

Sitt Zahida (Arabic: ست زاهدة also known as Sitt al-Muluk (Arabic: ست الملوك), born 1279 – died 1328) was a great-granddaughter of the last Abbasid caliph al-Musta'sim (r. 1242–1258) through his son Abu al-Manaqib Mubarak, a poet and philanthropist. Her full name was Zahida bint Abdullah bin Mubarak bin al-Musta'sim (Arabic: زاهده بنت عبدالله بن مبارك بن المستعصم).

Born in Baghdad, she is best known for founding a school in the city of Amedi called the "Zahidiyya School" named after her; poets and scholars gathered at her home to express their views.

Zahida married her cousin, Izz al-Din, and had four sons: Malik Imad al-Din, Malik Ahmad, Malik Mahmud, and Malik Khalil. Her youngest son, Malik Khalil al-Abbasi, seized Amedi and founded the Abbasid Emirate of Bahdinan—named after his son, Baha al-Din—where she established her school.

During his visit to Mosul, Ibn Battuta encountered Sitt Zahida within a caravan heading towards Baghdad. He documented her piety, noting her descent from the caliphs, her frequent fasting, and her multiple pilgrimages, as well as her entourage of impoverished followers. Sitt Zahida died during this journey and was buried at Zarud.
