= Gueraula de Codines =

Spanish folk healer (1275–1340)

Gueraula [Geralda] de Codines (c. 1275–1340), was a Catalan folk healer.

She was a married peasant woman who lived in Subirats Alt Penedès and was active as a folk healer and a fortune teller. She enjoyed wide spread fame for her medical ability in contemporary Catalonia.

In 1303, a report to the Bishop of Barcelona, Ponç de Gualba, referred to her as divinatrix de parrochia de Subirat and described her popularity among the parishioners. She was questioned for sorcery and fortune telling in 1304 and 1307. She used magical spells to cure both humans and animals, including placing corn in the tails of sick animals, but also answered that she studied the urine of patients.

She said that she had been taught medicine by a trained physician named 'En Bonfi' and in the 1307 hearing she denounced a local 'Saracen' woman, Aixa of the castle of Subirats, who had cast spells to find stolen objects and against evil. Gueraula was admonished to repentance and not to repeat her activity, although she was allowed to continued to read urine and advise the sick. She was however admonished for the same crimes in 1327-30 and this time the denunciation was more serious - it was said that her medical practices reeked of heresy - and she was apparently still active and popular. In 1330 a local Inquisitor became involved in her case, although the case does not seem to have been prosecuted.
