= Urania of Worms =

- The grave of Lady Urania
- Died: February 11, 1275
- Burial place: Worms, Germany
- Other names: Orania, Orgiah

Urania bat Abraham of Worms (Hebrew: אורניאה/אורגיאה בת אברהם, died 11 February 1275), also known as Orania and Orgiah, was a Jewish precentress in medieval Ashkenaz (Rhineland and the Palatinate). Urania's role as a precentress, one of a handful of women known to be serving in this capacity in this region in the 13-14th centuries, is attested on her grave stone.

== Biography ==
Little is known about Urania save that she died a young woman, the daughter of a Rabbi Avraham. The exact pronunciation of her name is uncertain. Rochelle Furstenberg spells the name as Urania—likely relating this woman's name to "Heavens"—while David Sperber spells her name Orania.

Urania died on Adar 6 (February 11), 1275, likely in the morning. Her tombstone, in the city of Worms, reads as in English follows:

This stone was first erected for this woman:

The lady Urania, the important, chosen, young woman,
Daughter of the initiated Rabbi Avraham, head of the singers, whose prayer [was] as beauty,
In the glory of his voice, for the sake of his nation, in the melody of a plea,
Whereas she too, with the sound of song, would sing for women:
Prayer-poems and, as a plea for her, she would become guarded.
But on the sixth day of Adar, on the first day, her soul was consumed, and on the seventh day of this, she was buried.

In Eden is her rest; she shall be remembered for good.
