= Zaynaddin Ibn al-Ajami =

Arabic poet

Zaynaddīn Ibn al-ʿAjamī
- Born: October 1195 CE
- Died: 11 May 1276 CE (aged 80)
- Other name: ʿAbdalmalik b. Sharafaddīn ʿAbdallāh b. ʿAbdarraḥmān Ibn al-Karābīsī
- Occupations: Literary and religious scholar
- Known for: Composing the first surviving Arabic riddle-collection by a single author

Zaynaddīn Ibn al-ʿAjamī, also known as ʿAbdalmalik b. Sharafaddīn ʿAbdallāh b. ʿAbdarraḥmān Ibn al-Karābīsī (Dhū l-Qaʿda 591–25 Dhū l-Qaʿda 674 AH/October 1195–11 May 1276 CE), was a literary and religious scholar of Aleppo, associated with the court of the Ayyubid sultan al-Malik al-Nāṣir Yūsuf (r. 634–658/1236–1260). He is noted for composing the first surviving Arabic riddle-collection by a single author, which is also 'the second oldest surviving Arabic work solely devoted to riddles'.

== Life ==
Ibn al-ʿAjamī was born into the Banū l-ʿAjamī, the pre-eminent exponents of the Shāfiʿī school of jurisprudence in Aleppo eleventh- to twelfth-century Aleppo. Their epithet al-ʿAjamī ('the Persian') reflected the family's roots in Nishapur, and their political position was bolstered by the Ayyubid dynasty's adherence to Shāfiʿī thought. Ibn al-ʿAjamī studied with Bahāʾaddīn Ibn Shaddād (539–632/1145–1235), Iftikhāraddīn al-Hāshimī(539–616/1144–1219), ʿAbdarraḥmān Ibn al-Ustādh (a.k.a. Ibn ʿAlwān, d. 623/1226), and Muwaffaqaddīn Ibn Yaʿīsh (553–643/1158–1245). In 616/1219–20 Ibn al-ʿAjamī was appointed as a qadī; he became a muʿīd at the Sayfiyya madrassa in 617/1220, and was participating in Alepine court life by the 1230s. He gained a teaching position at the Nūriyya madrasa in 656/1258–59, also becoming head of the ṣūfī orders. For the months Muḥarram–Ǧumādā 1659/January–May 1261 achieved the position of judge, but Mongol invasions led him to flee to Damascus, where he became a deputy for the qadi Ibn Khallikān (608–681/1211–1282). The pressure of Mongol invasions led him to retreat further in 661/1262–63, to Cairo, where he gained a position at the mosque of Ibn Ruzzīk through the offices of the qadī Tājaddīn ʿAbdalwahhāb b. Khalaf (d. 665/1266–67). He continued legal work under Tājaddīn’s successor, Taqīyaddīn Ibn Razīn until his death. He was inhumed in the Muqaṭṭam cemetery, close to the tomb of al-Shāfiʿī himself.

== Work ==
Ibn al-ʿAjamī is reported to have composed one collection of love poetry, another of secular praise poems, and another of poems in praise of the Prophet, sermons, a book on Sufism, and maqāmāt. Of these works, all that survives is about twenty epigrams quoted in Ibn ash-Shaʿʿār's Qalāʾid al-jumān and Muḥammad Rāghib al-Ṭabbāḫ's Iʿlām al-nubalāʾ bi-tārīkh Ḥalab al-shahbāʾ.

However, in 2020 Nefeli Papoutsakis reported her discovery of a unique, probably autograph, and previously incorrectly catalogued manuscript of nearly two hundred riddles by Ibn al-ʿAjamī (along with Ibn al-ʿAjamī's commentary on the meanings of his own riddles): the mid-thirteenth century, Kitāb iʿjāz al-munājī fī l-alghāz wa-l-aḥājī (rendered by Nefeli Papoutsakis as 'The Confidant’s Bemusement: On Riddles and Charades'). 203 folios survive, with one or two being lost after folio 180. The work is dedicated to al-Malik an-Nāṣir Yūsuf, and indeed the manuscript was probably itself presented to him. The work opens with an apology for the riddle based on the Kitāb al-iʿjāz fī al-aḥājī wa al-alghāz of Abū al-Maʿālī al-Ḥaẓīrī (d. 568/1172). It then presents 192 verse riddles, comprising 991 lines in the manuscript as it stands, arranged in alphabetical order of their rhyming sound. Each riddle is entitled with its solution and followed by a philological commentary. Most of the riddles are true riddles, though there are also about twenty muʿammayāt. Next come twenty riddles and similar conundrums in rhymed prose. The collection closes with twenty charades (aḥājī). In Papoutsakis's assessment, 'Zaynaddīn’s work attests to the efflorescence of the literary riddle in Ayyubid Syria and the popularity it enjoyed at Ayyubid courts and in elite circles in general'.
