= Firzogerin =

Historical female religious role in Ashkenazi Jewish synagogues

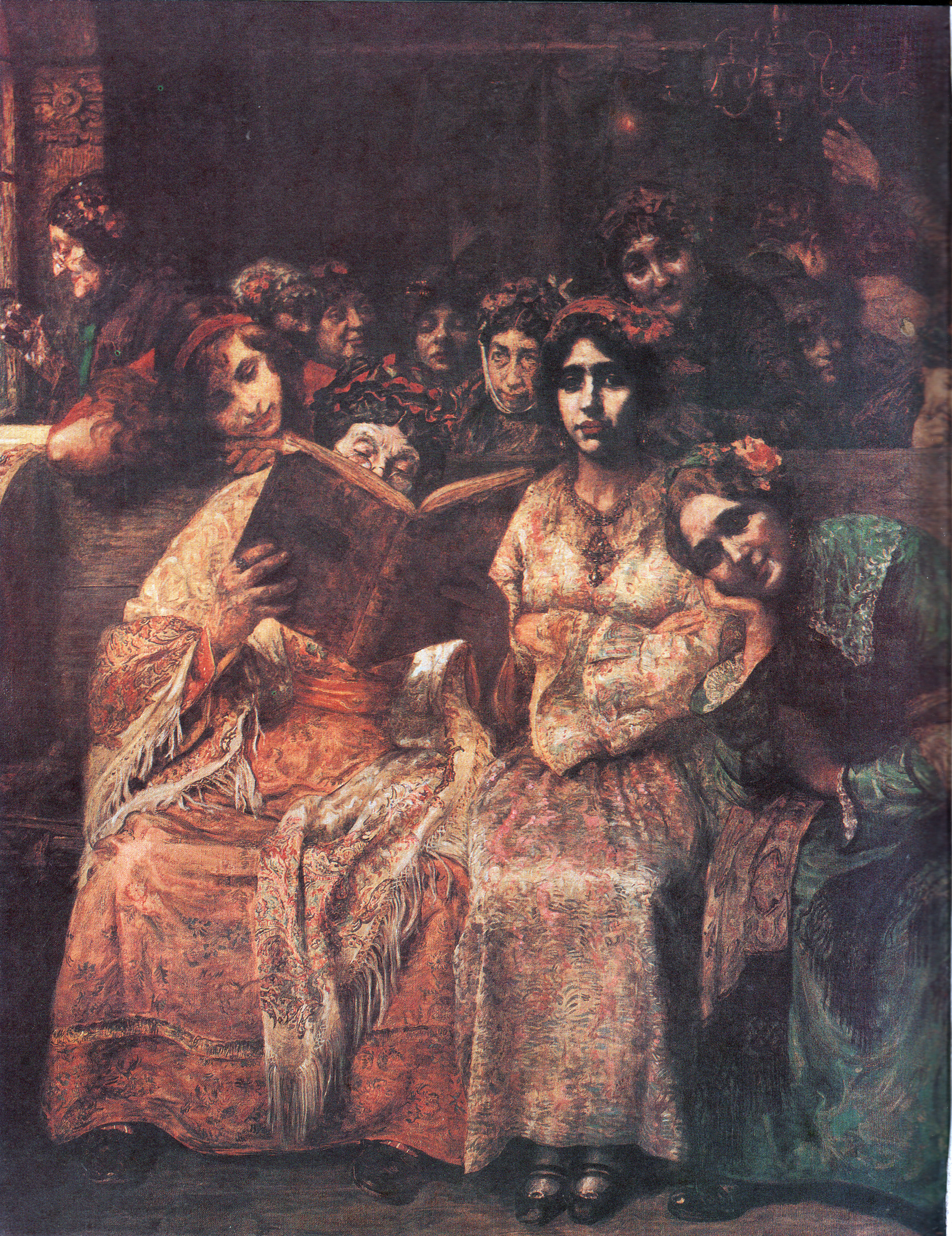
A firzogerin reads from Megillat Eicha in the Women's Gallery on Tisha B'Av (from "Remembrance of the Destruction," Leopold Pilichowski, 1925).

A firzogerin, (Yiddish: פֿירזאָגערין, lit. 'fore-sayer' or 'front-sayer'; Hebrew: רבנית דרשנית, romanized: rabbanit ha-darshanit), alternately vorsangerin, foreleiner, zugerin, or zugerke, was a historic role in the synagogue for a learned Jewish woman leading women in prayer from the weibershul (women's gallery or annex) as a precentress, parallel to the main service led by a male chazzan.

== Role ==
Gender-segregated seating within synagogues was common from the early Middle Ages well into the modern period. The firzogerin stood in the front of the women's gallery, balcony, or annex and translated the Hebrew prayers into the vernacular language for the other women who had come to pray. Sometimes the firzogerin translated more or less exactly; other times she translated freely and added her own interpretation. This parallel prayer system was probably welcome to women for whom the Hebrew liturgy, due to their lack of education, was largely incomprehensible. The firzogerin attained her status because she was more knowledgeable than most women, often acquiring her knowledge of Hebrew and the intricacies of Judaism from her husband, father, or other learned relative. It was not unusual for this position to be held consecutively by several generations of women of a particular family. Besides reciting prayers for and mentoring other female members of the community, firzogerin would sometimes write their own prayers (called tkhines) as well as poems. On rare occasions women precentors may have led a second prayer service apart from the one organized by men.

== Origin ==
The origin of women precentors in synagogues is directly related to the adoption of gender-segregated ritual space for rabbinic Jewish practice. Although the first historical evidence of gender-separation appears as early as the eighth century in Karaite synagogues, the first direct discussion of gender segregation by rabbis appears in the tenth century. This evolved into a Jewish tradition under the rabbis of the Geonic era (c. 600–1040), spreading on migration and trade routes, as well as through the correspondence of rabbinic responsa between Jewish communities. By the mid-fifteenth century, gender-segregation was accepted as commonplace.

The first historically recognizable women precentors emerge soon after the Weibershul annex of the Worms Synagogue was established, c. 1215. This annex, unlike a veiled or gated meḥitsa was a separate structure. (A similar annex was built in the Frankfurt Synagogue.) Both Dulcie (wife of Rabbi Eliezer of Worms) and Urania bat Abraham served as precentors in the Worms weibershul. Richenza is mentioned in the yizkor book of Nuremberg. Marat Guta bat R. Nathan (d. 1308) was another of the early firzogerin of whom it was written: "she prayed from the women in her lovely prayer." The phenomenon of women precentors continued to develop and spread geographically. Examples are found across Europe, the Mediterranean and the Americas, as well as among Ashkenazim and Sephardim. (Firzogerin and synonymous titles were unique to Ashkenazi communities.) Female precentors appear to have flourished most in Eastern Europe, reaching their apex during the 18th and 19th centuries, just prior to the emergence of Judaism's liberal and egalitarian movements.

== Examples ==
The most famous firzogerin was the Ḥassidic rebbe, Hannah Rochel Verbermacher (1815–1888), the only child of a wealthy merchant from Ludmir, Volhynia where she had her own shtiebel (called the Gornshtibl). Fanny Neuda (1819-1894), may have composed and collected the supplicatory prayers she later published in her bestelling Stunden der Andacht (1855), while serving as the firzogerin of the synagogue of her husband, Rabbi Abraham Neuda in Loštice. Earlier examples of firzogerin include Rebbetsin Serril Rappaport of Oleksiniec (daughter of the Dubner Maggid, c. late 18th century), Rachel Mendes Meza (18th century) of Jodensavanne, Leah Dreyzl (early 18th century, wife of R' Aryeh Leib Auerbach) of Stanislov, Toybe [Pan] (17th century, wife of Yankev Pan) of Prague, Deborah Ascarelli (sixteenth century) of Rome, and Rebecca Tiktiner (d. 1550, daughter of Rabbi Meir Tiktiner) of Prague. Though specific names have not yet been identified, instances of Jewish women precentors also occurred in 17th century Ottoman Constantinople and Salonika.

== See also ==
- Mechitza
- Tkhines
