= William of Luxi =

William of Luxi, O.P.
- Born: Unknown suburb of Burgundy, France
- Died: After 1275
- Education: Priory of Saint James; University of Paris
- Occupations: Priest, Preacher, Theologian Biblical Exegete
- Writing career
- Genre: Scholasticism
- Subjects: Commentaries on the Bible, Theology, Ethics
- Notable work: Commentary on the Minor Prophets (Postilla super XII Prophetas)

William of Luxi, O.P. (fl. 1267–1275), also Guillelmus de Luxi or (Luci, Lusci, Luscy, Lexi, Lissi, Lisi, Lyssy), was born in the region of Burgundy, France, sometime during the first quarter of the thirteenth century. He was a Dominican friar who became regent master of Theology at the University of Paris and a noted biblical exegete and preacher.

== Biography ==
Little is known about William's early life, except that he was most likely born during the first quarter of the thirteenth century in a village south of the city of Auxerre in Burgundy, France. Details about William's entrance into the Dominican Order and his arrival at Paris are unknown. However, he must have shown great academic promise, since he was singled out to continue his theological training at the Priory of Saint James, the Dominican Order's studium generale located in Paris. He subsequently became regent master at the University of Paris after 1260, probably between 1267 and 1275.

While teaching and preaching within the environs of Paris, William found himself embroiled in the second phase of the Mendicant Controversy (1267-1271) and the Averroist Controversy of 1270. Through his sermons he voiced his support for the universal preaching mission of the mendicant orders (particularly the Dominican and Franciscan Orders) and their right to hear confessions publicly, and expressed his disdain for the moral laxity of secular clerics. While at Paris he seems to have had cordial relations with the Franciscans and Saint Bonaventure in particular, since he was invited to preach the second part of a scholastic sermon with Saint Bonaventure at the Franciscan Cordeliers Convent at Paris in 1267, and fondly mentions the death of Saint Bonaventure in a sermon preached on the first Sunday of Lent sometime after 1275 in Paris. His sermons suggest that William was a conservative theologian committed to the principle that philosophers should not attempt to use philosophy to resolve purely theological questions.

== Identity and recognition ==
From the sixteenth century until modern times, William has been identified as both a thirteenth century French Dominican and a fourteenth century English Franciscan. It was not until the late nineteenth century, when Barthélemy Hauréau published his landmark studies on Latin medieval manuscripts conserved at the Bibliothèque nationale de France, that the shadowy William begins to gain the attention of modern scholars. More recent scholarly publications have done much to shed light on William's contributions as a biblical commentator and preacher, and have confirmed his identity as a thirteenth century French Dominican.

William's biblical commentaries and sermons were copied during his lifetime and enjoyed fairly wide distribution throughout Europe. Within fifty years of his death, William was recognized as an outstanding biblical exegete. In a list of biblical commentaries written by Landolphus de Columna sometime before 1328, William comes across as a biblical commentator of some repute. In Landolphus' list he is firmly placed within the circumference of an illustrious circle of medieval, biblical exegetes that include Nicholas Trivet, Thomas Aquinas, Dominic Grima, Peter of Tarentaise, Nicholas of Lyra and Hugh of St. Cher.

== Writings ==
William's surviving corpus of writings are all biblical commentaries or postills and sermons produced between 1267 and 1275, nearly all of which remain in manuscript form.

He is chiefly remembered for his biblical commentaries, upon which "he spent the greatest part of his lifetime searching narrowly into, and expounding the oracles of the Prophets", notes historian Anthony Parkinson. His postills on the Book of Jeremiah, the Book of Lamentations, the Book of Baruch and the Twelve Minor Prophets survive in five medieval manuscripts, and two commentaries, one on the Catholic Epistles and the other on the Book of Revelation, are presumed lost. Although more work needs to be done in order to determine which near contemporary sources influenced his exegetical writings, studies of his commentaries on the Book of Baruch and a number of his biblical prologues suggest that he was influenced by near contemporaries Stephen Langton, a certain Dean of Salisbury (possibly Richard Poore), Hugh of St. Cher, William of Middleton, William of Alton, and possibly John Pecham.

Biblical Commentaries: English Title	Biblical Commentaries: Latin Title
Commentary on the Book of Jeremiah	Postilla super Ieremiam
Commentary on the Book of Lamentations	Postilla super Threnos
Commentary on the Book of Baruch	Postilla super Baruch
Commentary on the Twelve Minor Prophets	Postilla super XII Prophetas

Twenty-eight sermons, sermones de tempore et sanctis, survive in sixteen medieval manuscripts. They are mostly 'school sermons', some of which are 'university sermons' preached at Paris. His sermons provide insight into the third generation of Dominican preachers at Paris and their preaching activity, especially on matters such as pastoral care and moral reform.

Sermons: English Title	Number of Sermons	Sermons: Latin Title
Third Sunday of Advent	1	Dominica tertia Adventus
Christmas	2	In festo Nativitatis Domini
On the Feast of St. Stephen	1	In festo sancti Stephani protomartyris
On the Feast of the Holy Innocents	1	In festo Innocentium
Septuagesima Sunday	2	Dominica in Septuagesima
Sexagesima Sunday	1	Dominica in Sexagesima
First Sunday in Lent	2	Dominica prima in Quadragesima
Second Sunday in Lent	1	Dominica secunda in Quadragesima
Fourth Sunday in Lent	1	Dominica quarta in Quadragesima
Palm Sunday	1	Dominica in Ramis Palmis
Sunday within the octave of Easter	1	Dominica infra octavam Paschae
Third Sunday after Easter	1	Dominica tertia post Pascha
Second feria day (or feast day) after Pentecost	1	Feria secunda post Pentecosten
On the Feast of the Most Holy Trinity	1	In festo Sacratissimae Trinitatis
Third Sunday after Trinity Sunday	1	Dominica tertia post Trinitatem
Seventh Sunday after Trinity Sunday	1	Dominica septima post Trinitatem
Fifteenth Sunday after Trinity Sunday	1	Dominica decima quinta post Trinitatem
Twenty-first Sunday after Trinity Sunday	1	Dominica vicesima prima post Trinitatem
Twenty-third Sunday after Trinity Sunday	1	Dominica vicesima tertia post Trinitatem
On the Feast of the Assumption	1	In festo Assumptionis Beatae Mariae Virginis
On the Feast of the Nativity of Mary	1	In festo Nativitatis Beatae Mariae Virginis
On the Feast of Saint Catherine (of Alexandria)	1	In festo sanctae Catherinae
On the commemoration of the Blessed Virgin Mary	1	In commemoratione Beatae Mariae Virginis
On the Feast of the Annunciation	1	In festo Annunciationis
A Sermon on any Saturday throughout the year	1	Sermo in quolibet Sabbato per annum

== Sources ==
- Bataillon, Louis-Jacques (1976). "Les crises de l'Université de Paris d'après les sermons universitaires". Die Auseinandersetzungen an der Pariser Universität im XIII Jahrhundert. Berlin: De Gruyter. pp. 155–169. ISBN 9783110059861.
- Hauréau, Barthélemy (1892). Notices et Extraits de Quelques Manuscrits Latins de la Bibliothèque Nationale. Vol. 4. Paris.
- Kaeppeli, Thomas; Panella, Emilio (1970–1993). Scriptores Ordinis Praedicatorum Medii Aevii. Rome.
- Linde, Cornelia (2013). "John Pecham on the Form of Lamentations". Form and Function in the Late Medieval Bible. Leiden: Brill. pp. 147–162. ISBN 9789004248885.
- Luxi de, Guillelmus (2006). Sulavik, Andrew (ed.). Guillelmi de Luxi Postilla super Baruch, Postilla super Ionam. Corpus christianorum continuatio mediaevalis 219. Turnhout: Brepols. ISBN 9782503051918.
- Stegmüller, Frederick (1950). Repertorium Biblicum Medii Aevi. Barcelona. ISBN 8400035100.
- Sulavik, Andrew (2002). "The Preaching of William of Luxi, O.P. at the Paris Schools between 1267 and 1275". Preaching and Society in the Middle Ages: Ethics, Values and Social Behaviour. Padua, Italy: Centro Studi Antoniani. ISBN 8885155537.
- Sulavik, Andrew (2004). "Hugh of St. Cher's Postill on the Book of Baruch: The work of a Medieval Compiler or Biblical Exegete?". Hugues de Saint-Cher (†1263) bibliste et théologien. Turnhout: Brepols. pp. 155–171. ISBN 2503517218.
