= Gerard of Lunel =

Franciscan cave hermit and saint

Saint Gerard of Lunel
- Born: ~1275; Lunel, France
- Died: 1298; Monte Santo, Italy
- Venerated in: Roman Catholic Church
- Beatified: August 1, 1742 by Benedict XIV
- Feast: May 6; May 25
- Patronage: Potenza Picena (formerly called Monte Santo); invoked against epilepsy and headaches

Gerard of Lunel (French: Gérard de Lunel) (Italian: San Gerio, Girio) (ca. 1275–1298), also known as Roger of Lunel and as Saint Géri (Gerius), was a French saint. Born to the French nobility, he became a Franciscan tertiary at the age of five.

From his maternal grandfather, Raymond Guasselin, Gerard received half of the Barony of Lunel, which consisted of 15 villages. When his grandfather died in 1294, Gerard received other assets that were administered by his father, since the future saint was underage at the time. In 1295, when Philip the Fair wished to possess a Mediterranean port, he offered to assume control over Lunel in exchange for the county of Roquefort, also situated in Languedoc, but in the diocese of Avignon rather than Montpellier. Gerard thus became a count rather than a baron. When he was 18, however, Gerard wished to live in solitude as a hermit. He and his brother Effrenaud (Effrendo) decided to live as hermit in two caves for two years.

According to his legend, when continuous rains swelled the river so much that the two brothers remained trapped in their cave and thus in danger of starving, two snakes carried bread to them. The rain then stopped, and Gerard and his brother traveled to a distant castle to receive communion. The miracle became known, and many people visited Gerard in his cave.

Wishing to escape the fame that they were earning as a result of their apparent holiness, they decided to make a pilgrimage to the Holy Land. They spent two years in Rome, visiting its shrines and churches. In Rome, Gerard learned that there lived a holy man named Liberius at Ancona, who had visited the Holy Land. Wishing to visit him, the two brothers began to travel in the direction of Ancona, but Gerard suddenly suffered a pain in his head.

Gerard suffered a collapse at Monte Santo (present-day Potenza Picena), near Ancona. Effrenaud, leaving Gerard in a cottage, went to get help but by the time he came back, Gerard had died.

== Veneration ==
A communal council at Monte Santo in 1371 approved a day of festivity in honor of Gerard as May 25.
