= John of Capua =

John of Capua also known as Johannes de Capua and Giovanni da Capua (born earlier than 1250, died later than 1300) was an Italian Jewish convert to Christianity, and a translator. He translated Rabbi Joel's Hebrew version of Kalilah wa-Dimnah (Persian translation of Panchatantra) into Latin under the title Directorium Vitae Humanae. His translation was the source from which that work became so widely spread in almost all European languages. It was edited by Joseph Derenbourg (Paris, 1887). John of Capua also translated Maimonides' Dietary and Ibn Zuhr's (Avenzoar's) Al-Taisir, on diseases.
