= Gregory of Raška =

Serbian medieval writer, copyist and bishop

Gregory of Raška or Grigorije Raški (Serbian Cyrillic: Григорије Рашки; early 14th century, 1275-1321) was a medieval Serbian writer and copyist, and Bishop of Raška.

== Life and work ==
He lived in the second half of the 13th and the first half of the 14th century. He is a Serbian monk who lived and wrote on the Holy Mountain, in Hilandar, in his youth. He also struggled in the monastery of Sopoćani. He is a true follower of the spirit of Mount Athos, completely committed to Mount Athos and Byzantine-Orthodox spirituality. Raška is the author of two very short texts of unusual literary beauty. He was then elected Bishop of Raška and returned to Serbia - Raška, to "remain" in Ras. For the monastery of the Church of the Holy Apostles Peter and Paul, Ras in 1305, he copied Krmčija of Saint Sava's Raška krmčija and in that manuscript, he left an excellent record of the need to read books and his transcribed and edited work. The record is characterized by stylistic and linguistic perfection and clear, poetic expression. His inscription in 4 verses (2 in the Byzantine "political verse" in the twelfth and two in the fourteenth), engraved on the silver cross of King Milutin, intended for the same monastery, is also known, in which there is a tendency towards an asymmetrical arrangement of verses and proper use of caesura.

== Translation into modern Serbian ==
Inscription on the Krmčija of Saint Sava, Verses of the Holy Cross, in: "Six Writers of the 14th Century" (Grigorije Raški, Jakov of Serres, Elder Siluan, Anonymous Athonite, Monk Jefrem, Marko Pećki), selection, today's language version and edited by Dimitrija Bogdanović. Belgrade, Prosveta, SKZ, 1986. Biblioteka Stara srpska književnost u 24 knjige, knj. 10.

== Sources ==
- "Hilandarski pisci", Belgrade, 1998.
- "Letopis Matice srpske", Novi Sad, 385/1960.
- "Delo", Belgrade, January 1, 1914.
- Đorđe Radojčić: "Anthology of Old Serbian Literature of the 11th - 18th Century", Belgrade 1960.

== Literature ==
- Dimitrije Bogdanović: Istorija stare srpske književnosti, Beograd, SKZ, 1980.
- Dimitrije Bogdanović: Grigorije Raški, in "Six Writers of the 14th Century", Belgrade, ed. Old Serbian literature in 24 books, 1986, p. 11-13.
- Đorđe Trifunović: Kratak pregled jugoslovenskih književnosti srednjega veka, Beograd, Filološki fakultet Beogradskog univerziteta, 1976.
- Dejan Mihailović: Byzantine Circle (Small Dictionary of Early Christian Literature in Greek, Byzantine and Old Serbian Literature), Belgrade, "Institute for Textbooks", 2009, p. 49.
