= Xueting Fuyu =

Xuětíng Fúyù (雪庭福裕), 1203–1275, was an abbot of the Shaolin Monastery of the Caodong lineage. He is famous for inviting all of the martial artists in China to the Temple to discuss, practice, and fight, refining their technique into one Shaolin style. He held these symposiums three times, each for a period of three years. As the martial artists returned to their home towns, they brought back the Shaolin techniques with them. This is why so many Asian martial arts systems can trace their roots to the Shaolin Temple, and why the Temple is sometimes erroneously known as "The birthplace of martial arts".

Fúyù also wrote a 70-character generation poem that is used for generational naming at the Shaolin Temple. Each generation uses the next word in the poem. For example, the 29th abbot of the Shaolin Temple, Shi Xing Zheng, was of the 32nd generation, and Xing is the 32nd word in the poem.

== See also ==
- Shaolin Monastery
- Chan Buddhism
