= Hamuro Mitsutoshi =

Japanese poet

Hamuro Mitsutoshi (葉室光俊, Hamuro no Mitsutoshi, 1203–1276) was a major waka poet and Japanese nobleman active in the early Kamakura period. He is designated as a member of the New Thirty-Six Immortals of Poetry (新三十六歌仙, Shinsanjūrokkasen).

After becoming a monk, he used the dharma name Shinkan (真観).
