= 1320s =

Decade

The 1320s was a decade of the Julian Calendar which began on January 1, 1320, and ended on December 31, 1329.

== Events ==
=== 1320 ===
==== January – March ====
- January 5 – Henry III, Count of Gorizia, arrives in Padua as the Imperial Vicar with a large army, promising protection to the Italian city state.
- January 20 – Duke Władysław I Łokietek ("Ladislaus the Short") becomes king of a reunited Poland, after receiving the approval from Pope John XXII. He is crowned, along with his wife Jadwiga of Kalisz, at the royal cathedral on Wawel Hill at Kraków. Wladysław's kingdom is surrounded by three hostile neighbors: Brandenburg, the Teutonic Order and Bohemia. Looking for allies, he makes an alliance with Charles I, ruler of Hungary.
- February 15 – Pope John XXII grants a mandate to the Archbishop of York, William Melton, to order restitution of confiscated Knights Templar property in England to the Knights Hospitaller.
- February 18 – Walter de Stapledon, Bishop of Exeter, becomes the new Lord High Treasurer of England.
- March 1 – Emperor Renzong of Yuan (China), the Mongol leader Ayurbarwada Buyantu Khan, dies after a reign of almost nine years.
- March 20 (Easter Sunday) – Shepherds' Crusade (Le Pastoureaux): In France, a large group of common people band together in Normandy to begin a crusade, after a teenage shepherd says he was visited by the Holy Spirit. They march south to Aquitaine, attacking castles, royal officials, priests and lepers along the way. Jewish communes are attacked at Saintes, Cahors, Verdun-sur-Garonne, Albi and Toulouse. When they finally cross into Spain, Aragonese forces under Prince Alfonso halt their advance.

==== April – June ====
- April 6 – Declaration of Arbroath: King Robert the Bruce sends a letter to Pope John XXII. He asks him to recognize Scottish sovereignty, and Robert's right to be ruler of Scotland, hoping that he will lift the excommunication order under which Robert is being held for the death of John Comyn III.
- April 19 – Gegeen Khan (Prince Shidibala) becomes the new Mongol Emperor Yingzong of the Yuan dynasty of China after the death of his father, Emperor Renzong, on March 1.
- May 29 – Pope John VIII of Alexandria, leader of the Coptic Orthodox Church, dies in Egypt after a reign of 20 years. He will be succeeded by Pope John IX
- June 4 – King Edward II of England appoints Lord Pembroke as keeper of the realm before traveling to France.
- June 18 – Treaty of Baena: Sultan Ismail I of Granada signs an 8-year truce with Castile at Baena. King James II of Aragon, who receives papal authorization and funds for a crusade against the Emirate of Granada refuses to accept the treaty. Both parties promise to aid one another against their respective enemies. Meanwhile, Ismail consolidates the territories formally under his control with the emirate.
- June 19 – Shepherds' Crusade: Unnerved by the prospect of the arrival of the shepherds at Avignon to begin a crusade, Pope John XXII orders their dispersal.

==== July – September ====
- July – Shepherds' Crusade: Many followers are arrested and executed, after which there are no further incidents and the crusade disperses.
- July 6 –To strengthen the alliance between Hungary and Poland, and with the approval of Pope John XXII, Charles I of Hungary marries Princess Elizabeth of Poland, the 15-year-old daughter King Wladyslaw I.
- July 9 – In India's Delhi Sultanate, Qutbuddin Mubarak Shah is murdered by his favourite, Khusrau Khan, who succeeds him on the throne.
- August 4 – William II de Soules confesses to treason before the Scottish Parliament at a hearing at the "Black Parliament" session held at Scone. For the crime of conspiring against King Robert, Soules is sentenced to life imprisonment at Dumbarton Castle.
- September 5 – Delhi's Sultan Khusrau Khan, who betrayed and murdered Qutbuddin Shah earlier in the year to become ruler in India, is himself betrayed and murdered by his governor, Ghiyath al-Din Tughluq, who founds Delhi's Tughlaq dynasty. Sultan Ghiyath appoints military governors in Punjab and Sindh province, who manage to halt Mongol incursions towards the sultanate.
- September 9 – Battle of Saint George: Byzantine forces under Andronikos Asen defeat the army of the Principality of Achaea, securing the possession of Arcadia. During the battle, Latin commander Bartholomew II Ghisi is taken prisoner, along with several high-ranking nobles of the principality, and is sent to Constantinople.
- September 28 – Pope John IX of Alexandria is elected as the new spiritual leader of the Coptic Orthodox Church, succeeding Pope John VIII.
- September 1320 - Sripada Sri Vallabha, incarnation of Lord Datta, is born in Pithapur, Andhra Pradesh.

==== October – December ====
- October 12 – Andronikos II Palaiologos, who was co-ruler of Byzantium, becomes the sole ruler upon the death of his son Michael IX Palaiologos. Michael's son Andronikos begins a rebellion against his grandfather emperor six months later.
- October 27 – Magnus Birgersson, who had been the crown prince of Sweden until his father, King Birger was forced to flee, is beheaded by order of King Magnus Eriksson. Magnus had defended the Stegeborg Castle in 1318 to allow his father to flee to safety. When the castle surrendered, it was under the condition that Magnus would not be harmed.

==== Date unknown ====
- Autumn – Byzantine forces under Andronikos Asen capture the Latin castles of Akova and Karytaina. They secure control over Arcadia and Cynuria in the Peloponnese.
- Battle of Rhodes: The Knights Hospitaller defeat an attempt by the Turks of Menteshe to capture Rhodes. During the battle, a Turkish invasion fleet (some 80 ships) is destroyed by a smaller Hospitaller-Genoese fleet.
- The Venetian Arsenal, a dockyard for naval ships, is rebuilt, known as the Arsenale Nuovo.
- Henri de Mondeville, French surgeon and physician, writes La Chirurgie, the first textbook on surgery by a Frenchmen.
- Approximate date – Earliest likely date for first permanent settlement of New Zealand by Māori people.

=== 1321 ===
==== January – March ====
- January 19 – King Edward II of England appoints the Archbishop of York; the Bishops of Carlisle, Worcester, and Winchester; the Earls of Pembroke, Hereford and Badlesmere; and six other people to negotiate with Scotland for a final peace treaty or an extension of the Pembroke treaty of 1319 before its expiration on Christmas Day.
- January 20 – The English Parliament appoints a commission to inquire about illegal confederacies in Wales against the King.
- January 30 – The Welsh Earls of Hereford, Arundel and Surrey, and 26 other people are forbidden from attending any meetings to discuss matters affecting King Edward II.
- February 10 – By papal verdict announced in the Polish town of Brześć, the Teutonic Knights are ordered to return the coastal region of Gdańsk Pomerania to Poland, having annexed and occupied it since 1308. The Teutonic Order appeals the judgment and continues fighting against Poland, with a new Polish–Teutonic War breaking out soon afterward.
- March 22 – The first Genkō era begins in Japan after the end of the Gen'ō era.

==== April – June ====
- April 8 – In the Delhi Sultanate of India, European Dominican missionaries who have accompanied Jordan Catala are killed while stranded on Salsette Island. Jordan escapes and continues his ministry.
- April 12 – Sweden's governing council votes to bar foreigners from the royal palace, and to request that the Norwegian council admonish the regent Ingeborg to avoid taking advice from foreigners when making decisions. Ingeborg, who is serving as regent for her minor son, King Magnus, ruler of Sweden and Norway, has become infamous for making decisions without consultation from the councils of either of the kingdoms.
- April 14 – Prince Wenceslaus of Płock allies with the Teutonic Knights of Poland and signs an agreement at the city of Golub, pledging to prevent Lithuanian troops from passing through his principality.
- April 19 – At Easter, the Byzantine civil war of 1321–1328 breaks out in the Byzantine Empire as Co-Emperor Andronikos III Palaiologos flees Constantinople to Adrianople, where he sets up his court and initiates an uprising against his grandfather, the Byzantine Emperor Andronikos II Palaiologos. The 24-year-old Andronikos is joined by Theodore Synadenos and John Kantakouzenos in the rebellion. Syrgiannes Palaiologos leads an expeditionary army towards the capital, forcing the emperor to negotiate.
- May 5 – Wars of the Rügen Succession: Dukes Otto I of Pomerania, Vartislav IV of Pomerania-Wolgast and Barnim III of Pomerania-Stettin reach a mutual inheritance contract with Vitslav III of Rügen.
- May 8 – In Egypt's Mamluk Sultanate, a campaign by Muslims starts against the Christian settlements of the Coptic Orthodox Church. Over 60 churches and monasteries are burned.
- May 16 – Johan de Bosco, a French person diagnosed with leprosy, claims that a fellow leper, "Geraldus" is attempting to spread their disease by contaminating wells, fountains, and rivers with bags of powder that will give leprosy to anyone who drinks from the water source. Rumors spread in southern France that French Jews are responsible, and is known as the 1321 lepers' plot.
- June 6 – Andronikos II Palaiologos concludes a peace agreement and divides the Byzantine Empire in two. Andronikos III is recognized as co-emperor and receives Thrace and Macedonia. He rewards his followers and gives them towns and regions to administer. Adrianople becomes the new capital.
- June 9 – Guillaume Agasse, the head of a leper house in Pamiers, claims in a statement to Bishop Jacques Founier (later Pope Benedict XII) that he had learned that more than fifty officials of leper houses had conspired with the Emirate of Granada to spread leprosy throughout France.
- June 21 – King Philip V of France orders that all lepers be imprisoned and interrogated. Those found guilty, often under torture, are to be burnt at the stake.
- June 23 – Pope John XXII approves a second inquiry into the matter of the canonization of Thomas Aquinas, with four commissioners to take testimony of witnesses.

==== July – September ====
- July 1 – María de Molina, grandmother of and regent for 12-year-old King Alfonso XI of Castile, dies at the age of 56, two relatives assume the regency and split Castile between themselves while chaos exists inside the Spanish kingdom. Alfonso's uncle, Don Juan Manuel de Ivrea, and cousin Juan de Castilla y Haro (called Juan el Tuerto or Juan the One-Eyed) remain in power until Alfonso XI reaches majority on 13 August 1325.
- July 15 – In England, the "Parliament of Whitebands" convenes with only 38 barons present, to remove suspect counsellors to the King.
- July 24 – A marriage contract is signed on behalf of Princess Euphemia, the 4-year-old sister of King Magnus of Sweden and Norway, and daughter of the regent Ingeborg of Norway, to eventually marry Albert of Mecklenburg the 3-year-old son of Henry I, Lord of Mecklenburg. The marriage will not take place until almost 15 years later.
- August 14 – King Edward II of England agrees to the demands from his barons to send Hugh Despenser the Elder and his son Hugh Despenser the Younger into exile. The Despensers helped Edward in the administration of his financial and land management affairs. This gives them both the opportunity to frustrate the ambitions of the barons and also the chance to enrich themselves.
- September 14 – Italian author Dante Alighieri, known for The Inferno, dies of malaria at Ravenna after having undertaken a diplomatic mission in the Republic of Venice.

==== October – December ====
- October 29 – King Stefan Milutin of Serbia dies after a 39-year reign. His son Stefan Konstantin claims the throne, but Konstantin's elder half-brother Stefan Dečanski starts a civil war and succeeds him.
- October 31 – Forces of Edward II of England capture Leeds Castle in Kent after Margaret de Clare, wife of Bartholomew Badlesmere, refuses Queen Isabella admittance in her husband's absence. When the Queen seeks to force an entry, Lady Badlesmere instructs her archers to shoot at Isabella and her party, six of whom are killed. After Edward occupies the castle, Lady Badlesmere becomes the first woman ever to be imprisoned in the Tower of London. She will be freed on November 3, 1322.
- November 10 – Canonization of Thomas Aquinas: In Italy, a second inquiry begins at Fossanova, as three commissioners (Pandulpho de Sabbello; Petrus Ferri, Bishop of Anagni; and Andreas, Bishop of Terracina) take testimony from over 100 witnesses until November 27.
- November 27 – In northern Italy, Rinaldo dei Bonacolsi, Duke of Mantua, begins the siege of Mirandola against Francesco I Pico, Duke of Mirandola. Bonaclsi has Pico and his sons Francesco and Tommasino arrested and imprisoned in the Castel d'Ario. A siege of the castle begins the next day and lasts 33 days.
- December 8 – Confronting the rebellion of Thomas of Lancaster (his cousin), the Baron Badlesmere and Roger Mortimer, King Edward II of England arrives in Cirencester, then leads troops up the Severn Valley from Gloucester against the rebels.
- December 26 – Faced with an invasion of London during the rebellion of Thomas of Lancaster, by troops led by the English rebel, the Baron Badlesmere, King Edward II of England offers safe conduct for any rebels who come over to the royalist side, but orders the Sheriff of Gloucester to arrest Badlesmere.
- December 28 (Genko 1, 9th day of 12th month) – In Japan, Emperor Go-Daigo begins direct government as the cloistered rule of former Emperor Go-Uda ceases.
- December 31 – The Duke of Mantua completes the siege of Mirandola, taking control of the Duchy, and then orders the castle of Duke Francesco I Pico to be destroyed.
- Winter – Byzantine civil war of 1321–1328: Syrgiannes Palaiologos switches support to Andronikos II Palaiologos, fleeing to Constantinople. Rewarded with the title of megas doux, he convinces the emperor to resume the war against Andronikos III.

==== Undated ====
- The Anatolian Beylik of Teke, a frontier principality, is established by the Oghuz Turks after the decline of the Seljuk Sultanate of Rum.

==== By topic ====
====== Education ======
- The University of Florence is established by the Republic of Florence.

====== Religion ======
- The Gračanica Monastery is founded by King Stefan Milutin, nicknamed "The Saint King", on the ruins of a 6th century basilica, located in Kosovo.
- The Spitakavor Monastery, near the Armenian town Yeghegnadzor, is completed.

====== Literature ======
- May 4 – The German play Ludus de decem virginibus, a dramatization of the New Testament Parable of the Ten Virgins, is first performed.
- Approximate date – The Kebra Nagast ("The Glory of the Kings") is translated from Arabic to Ge'ez, according to its colophon.

=== 1322 ===
==== January – March ====
- January 3 – Charles IV the Fair, the last member of the House of Capet and younger brother of King Philip V, becomes the new King of France upon Philip's death at Longchamp Abbey, near Paris. After Charles assumes the throne, he refuses to release his wife Blanche of Burgundy, who is imprisoned for adultery with a Norman knight, from prison, and asks that the marriage be annulled.
- January 6 – Stephen Uroš III Dečanski becomes king of Serbia, having defeated his half-brother Stefan Konstantin in battle. He is crowned by Archbishop Nikodim I, and his 14-year-old son Stefan Dušan becomes co-ruler of Serbia. This is the first coronation for a "young king" in Serbia. Dečanski later grants him the province of Zeta as a fief, indicating his intention for Dušan to be his heir.
- January 12 – Marie of Brabant, queen dowager of France, dies.
- February 13 – The collapse of the central crossing tower of Ely Cathedral in eastern England, possibly as a result of digging foundations for the Lady Chapel, allows the construction of the Octagon that takes its place.
- March 10 – "Despenser War": Battle of Burton Bridge – King Edward II of England orders an attack on the fortified positions of the Contrariant army under his cousin Thomas of Lancaster at Walton-on-Trent in the Midlands. Thomas is heavily outnumbered and decides to withdraw, but is pursued by Edward's troops. He escapes with the remnants of his army to Tutbury Castle and evades Edward's patrols to cross the flooded River Dove. Finally, Thomas makes his way northwards.
- March 16 – "Despenser War": Battle of Boroughbridge – English royal forces (some 4,000 men) led by Andrew Harclay defeat the Contrariant barons at Boroughbridge in Yorkshire. During the battle, Harclay holds the bridge against fierce rebel attacks and Thomas of Lancaster is forced to surrender.
- March 22 – After a show trial at Pontefract Castle, and his conviction by a tribunal for treason against the crown, English rebel Thomas of Lancaster is beheaded in public.

==== April – June ====
- April 14 – Baron Badlesmere, another leader of the unsuccessful Contrariant attempt to overthrow King Edward II of England, is found guilty of treason at a trial in Canterbury. His death sentence is carried out later in the day.
- April 22 – Albert IV becomes the new Duke of Saxe-Lauenburg in Germany upon the death of his father, John II.
- April 30 (1st waning of Kason 684 ME (Burmese calendar)) – Tarabya I becomes the new ruler of the Sagaing Kingdom of Burma after the death of King Saw Yun, according to the Yazawin Thit chronicle.
- May 19 – At the request of King Charles IV of France, Pope John XXII annuls the marriage of Charles and Blanche of Burgundy. Blanche is transferred from prison to Gavray Castle.
- June 24 – In Italy, Galeazzo I Visconti becomes the new Lord of Milan upon the death of his father Matteo I Visconti.
- June 26 – Alice de Lacy, Countess of Lincoln, widow of the Contrariant leader Thomas of Lancaster, surrenders almost all of her properties to King Edward II of England in order to avoid execution.

==== July – September ====
- July 1 – Al-Nasir Muhammad, the Mamluk Sultan of Egypt, asks for aid from the Ikhanate Mongol ruler of Iran, Abu Sa'id Bahadur Khan, for help in modern-day southern Turkey. Al-Nasir has started a campaign against the Armenian Kingdom of Cilicia, led by King Oshin, and Pope John XXII has recently dispatched troops to aid the Armenians. By the time the Ikhanate troops arrive, a ceasefire has been negotiated between the Muslims and the Christians.
- July 6 – In northern Italy, troops of the semi-independent Patriarchate of Aquileia, led by Bishop Pagano della Torre, are routed in a battle at Bassignana against the Duchy of Milan, led by Duke Galeazzo I Visconti.
- July 17 – An agreement is reached in the Byzantine civil war between Emperor Andronikos II and his rebellious grandson, Andronikos III Palaiologos, signed outside the Byzantine fortress of Epibates (modern Selimpaşa in Turkey). The two men agree that they will jointly rule Byzantium as co-Emperors.
- August 1 – Pope John XXII issues a general decree condemning the Fraticelli (Spriritual Franciscans) in the Kingdom of Naples, urging Robert, King of Naples ("the Wise") to suppress the adherents rebelling against Roman Catholic doctrine.
- August 27 (Genkō 2, 16th day of 8th month) – Japanese historian Kokan Shiren completes his work, the Genkyo Shakusho, the oldest existing account of the development of Buddhism in Japan.
- August/September – Battle of Bliska: A coalition of Croatian noblemen (with the support of King Charles I of Hungary) defeats Mladen II Šubić of Bribir, ruler (ban) of Bosnia. After the battle, Mladen is arrested by the Croatian Parliament during an assembly held in Knin Fortress and is taken as a prisoner to the royal court in Hungary on October 8.
- September 17 – Louis Dampierre becomes the new Count of Flanders (the Flemish-speaking half of modern-day Belgium) upon the death of his grandfather, Robert III, "The Lion of Flanders". Louis has become Count of Nevers upon the July 22 death of his father (and Robert's eldest son), Count Louis.
- September 20 – Scotland's King Robert the Bruce begins the "Great Raid" on sites in northern England, leading troops across the River Tweed and starting with an attack on Norham Castle. England's King Edward II responds with an order directing the English Army to assemble at Newcastle upon Tyne to make a counterattack.
- September 21 – King Charles IV the Fair of France marries the 18-year-old Marie of Luxembourg, the eldest daughter of the late Henry VII, Holy Roman Emperor, following the annulment of Charles's marriage to Blanche of Burgundy. Marie dies 18 months later.
- September 28 – Battle of Mühldorf: Bavarian forces (some 2,000 men) led by King Louis the Bavarian defeat the Austrians commanded by his cousin, Frederick the Fair, Duke of Austria and self-proclaimed pretender to the Bavarian throne (or anti-king) at Mühldorf in southern Bavaria. During the battle, Frederick is captured together with his 22-year-old brother, Henry the Friendly (along with 1,000 nobles). Frederick is imprisoned at Trausnitz Castle for two and a half years before his release by the signing of the Treaty of Trausnitz on March 13, 1325.

==== October – December ====
- October 14 – "Great Raid": Battle of Old Byland – Scottish forces led by King Robert the Bruce defeat the English army in Yorkshire. During the battle, Robert and his highlanders charge themselves in a flanking position, from where the English troops are overrun, the most significant Scots victory over the English since Bannockburn in 1314. Edward II narrowly escapes capture and is forced to abandon his personal equipment, silver plate, jewelry and horse trappings. He flees with his retinue to Bridlington.
- November 2
  - Dmitry of Tver, nicknamed "Dmitry of the Fearsome Eyes", Grand Prince of Tver in Russia, becomes the new monarch of the Grand Principality of Vladimir.
  - Scotland's King Robert the Bruce ends his "Great Raid" campaign after six weeks, and withdraws his troops from northern England.
- November 3 – Margaret de Clare, widow of the Contrariant Baron Baldesmere, is freed from incarceration after having spent more than a year as the first woman ever to be imprisoned in the Tower of London (having defied the queen). Margaret retires to a religious life at the convent of the Minorite Sisters (later known as the Poor Clares).
- November 16 – The tiny Spanish emirate of Guadix, created after Nasr was forced to abdicate as Sultan of Granada in 1314, comes to an end upon Nasr's death.
- December 8 – Pope John XXII issues the papal bull Ad conditorem canonum, permanently renouncing the doctrine that the Roman Catholic Church owns all of the properties of the Franciscan Order.
- December 25 – King James II of Aragon marries for the fourth time during his reign, taking as his bride Elisenda de Montcada, in a ceremony in the Spanish city of Tarragona.

==== Approximate date ====
- The Dalmatian House of Keglević (generatio Percal) is mentioned in a document for the first time.

=== 1323 ===
==== January – March ====
- January 3 – Englishman Andrew Harclay, 1st Earl of Carlisle, who had recently defeated rebel Thomas, 2nd Earl of Lancaster at the Battle of Boroughbridge, commits treason by signing a peace treaty with Scotland's King Robert the Bruce.
- January 14 – On behalf of the Fraticelli order of Spiritual Franciscans, Italian lawyer Bonagrazia of Bergamo issues a protest to Pope John XXII of the December 8 papal bull Ad conditorem canonum. Pope John revises the text of the bull and reissues it, but also punishes Bonagrazia for his insolence by having him imprisoned.
- January 25 – Vilnius, now the capital of Lithuania is first mentioned as a city, when the second of the Letters of Grand Duke Gediminas of the Duchy of Lithuania are sent to German cities inviting German Jews and other Germans to resettle in the city of "Vilna".
- February 20 – Norway's regency council takes a stand against Ingeborg Haakonsdater, mother of and regent for the 7-year-old King Magnus VII. Ingeborg is removed from her position as chief regent on charges of misuse of her power.
- February 25 – The Earl of Carlisle is arrested at Carlisle Castle by the Castle's warden, Anthony de Lucy, on charges of treason and turned over to the custody of King Edward II of England.
- March 3 – The Earl of Carlisle is tried and convicted for treason, then executed later in the day. Carlisle is hanged, drawn and quartered, and parts of his body are sent to various sites in England for public display.
- March 6 – Treaty of Paris: Count Louis I relinquishes Flemish claims over the County of Zeeland. He acknowledges William II the Good as count of Avesnes, Holland, and Zeeland as a state within the Holy Roman Empire. William occupies most of the Bishopric of Utrecht and tries to conquer Friesland (or Frisia) but is repelled by Governor Hessel Martena.
- March 13 – Siege of Warangal: Sultan Ghiyath al-Din Tughluq sends an expeditionary army led by his son, Muhammad bin Tughluq, to the Kakatiya capital Warangal – after ruler Prataparudra has refused to make tribute payments. He besieges the city and finally, after a campaign of 8 months, Prataparudra surrenders on November 9.

==== April – June ====
- April 11 – Hugh II, the self-styled King of Arborea (on the Italian island of Sardinia, with a capital at Oristano, becomes a vassal of Spain's King James II of Aragon in exchange for maintenance of the dynastic rights over his Judicate, and begins a war on the Italian mainland against the Republic of Pisa, winning a battle at Villanovaforru.
- April 23 – Elizabeth of Carinthia marries Peter, Crown Prince of Sicily, co-ruler (with his father Frederick II) of the Kingdom of Sicily.
- April 25 – Nicolò Pistorino becomes the new Grand Chancellor of the Republic of Venice, succeeding Jacopo Bertoldi, who held the office for almost nine years.
- May 15 – Marie of Luxembourg is formally crowned as Queen consort of France at Sainte-Chapelle after her September 21 marriage to King Charles IV.
- May 21 – The German ruler Henry II, Lord of Mecklenburg, signs a peace treaty with King Christopher II of Denmark confirming his conquest of the Lordship of Rostock.
- May 26 – Gediminas, Grand Duke of Lithuania, sends his third, fourth and fifth letters to German cities to advocate that residents relocate to his the Duchy of Lithuania.
- May 30 – King Edward II of England makes a 13-year truce with Scotland at York. Despite the truce, Edward refuses to accept Robert the Bruce as ruler of an independent Scottish kingdom.
- May 31 – Zhao Xian, who had been the Song dynasty Emperor of China from 1274 to 1276, commits suicide as an alternative to being executed, after being viewed as a threat by the Yuan dynasty Mongol Emperor Yingzong.
- June 11 – Bertrand du Pouget, French papal legate, commanding a military campaign against the Ghibellines besieges Milan – but abandons the siege when Louis IV of Bavaria, King of the Romans, sends a relief army to Italy to aid the city and to protect his domains against the Kingdom of Naples, which is together with France the strongest ally of the Papal States.
- June 28 – Siege of Villa di Chiesa: Aragonese forces under Prince Alfonso IV the Kind begin the siege at Villa di Chiesa. The fortified town is founded by Count Ugolino della Gherardesca, but is now under the control of the Republic of Pisa. Alfonso attacks the town with some 1,000 men and several siege engines, while the citizens are starved to death.

==== July – September ====
- July 18 – Thomas Aquinas, Italian priest and theologian, is canonized by Pope John XXII at the Avignon Cathedral and canonized as a saint.
- August 12 – Treaty of Nöteborg: Sweden signs a peace treaty with the Novgorod Republic, regulating the border (known as Finland today) for the first time. The treaty is negotiated with the help of the Hanseatic League in order to conclude the conflict over the control of the Gulf of Finland during the Swedish-Novgorodian Wars.
- September 4 – Gegeen Khan, the Mongol Emperor Yingzong of China is assassinated in a coup d'etat on orders of Yesün Temür, who becomes the new Emperor
- September 28 – In southern Burma (now Myanmar), Saw Zein becomes the new monarch of the Hanthawaddy kingdom (or Martaban) upon the death of his older brother, Saw O.

==== October – December ====
- October 8 – John XXII claims the right to confirm imperial elections and demands that Louis IV of Bavarian surrender his claim to be King of the Romans.
- October 15 – Hostilities that will lead to the War of Saint-Sardos between England and France begin when King Charles IV of France has a royal sergeant place a stake claiming to claim the French town of Saint-Sardos, territory within the jurisdiction of King Edward II of England (who is also the ruler of the Duchy of Aquitaine in southeastern France).
- October 16 – Lord Raymond-Bernard, of the Aquitaine town of Montpezat, burns the village of Saint-Sardos to the ground and hangs the French royal sergeant who acted as agent for King Charles IV. France's government blames the England's Baron Basset of the Duchy of Gascony, for hiring Lord Raymond-Bernard.
- November 12 – Pope John XXII issues the papal bull Cum inter nonnullos as an addendum to the December 8 bull Ad conditorem canonum, declaring that the assertion of the Fraticelli that Christ and the Apostles possessed no property (and advocated poverty as a Christian virtue) is a heresy.
- November – Flemish Revolt: A uprising in Flanders is caused by both excessive taxation levied by Louis I, and by his pro-French policies. The revolt is led by landowning farmers under Nicolaas Zannekin. Members of the local gentry join and William Deken, mayor of Bruges, becomes the leader of the revolt.
- December 7 – John of Nottingham and Robert of Coventry, two Englishmen believed by Coventry residents to be expert on necromancy, begin the process of casting a spell to kill King Edward II, Sir Hugh le Despenser of Winchester, as well as the prior of Coventry. John allegedly accepted 20 pounds sterling, and starts his necromancy by making wax figurines of the targets of elimination and then using them for the next six months. The two men will later be prosecuted for sorcery after one of the designated victims allegedly dies after a pin is driven into his figurine.
- December 21 – In further retaliation by the King Charles of France against King Edward of England for the Saint-Sardos incident, Edward's chief advocate in France's parliament, Pons Tournemire, is arrested and imprisoned in the Grand Châtelet.

=== 1324 ===
==== January – March ====
- January 3 – The Taiding Era begins in China three months after Borjigin Yesün Temür ascends the throne.
- January 23 – England's envoy to France, Ralph Basset, and Raymond-Bernard de Montpezat, decline to obey an order to appear before King Charles IV of France to answer for the October 16 burning of Saint-Sardos. King Charles orders their properties forfeited to the crown.
- February 7 – Siege of Villa di Chiesa: Aragonese forces led by Prince Alfonso ("the Kind") capture the city of Villa di Chiesa due to attrition. The Pisan garrison surrenders after an 8-month siege. It represents the first act of the Aragonese conquest of Sardinia, for the creation of the Kingdom of Sardinia.
- February 29 – Battle of Lucocisterna: Aragonese forces led by Prince Alfonso defeat a Pisan army, which is disembarked near the area of Capoterra. During the battle, Alfonso loses some 150 knights. On the same day, a Pisan fleet (some 30 galleys) is defeated in the Gulf of Cagliari at Sardinia.
- March 23 – Pope John XXII excommunicates Louis IV (Ludwig the Bavarian), King of the Romans, as Louis has not sought papal approval during his conflict against his rival Frederick the Fair. Louis, in turn, declares the pope a heretic, because of John's opposition to the view of the absolute poverty of Christ held by some Franciscans.
- March 26 – Marie of Luxembourg, Queen of France, dies of injuries after falling from a carriage while she and King Charles IV are riding from Paris to Avignon. After her fall, she went into labor and gave birth prematurely to a child, who died shortly afterward.
- March 31 – Hugh IV becomes the new King of Cyprus upon the death of his father, King Henry II. Hugh also inherits Henry's nominal title of "King of Jerusalem".

==== April – June ====
- April 15 – The coronation of King Hugh IV of Cyprus, nephew of the late King Henry II, takes place at the Cathedral of Saint Sophia in Nicosia.
- April 20 – Boleslaw III, Duke of Wroclaw, declares his Polish duchy to be a vassal of the Holy Roman Empire as part of a defense agreement made with Louis IV, King of the Romans.
- May 3 – France's Consistori del Gay Saber holds its first annual contest to determine the best poet in the Kingdom. Arnaut Vidal de Castelnou d'Ari wins the first prize, the violeta d'aur. The contest continues for 160 years, ceasing in 1484.
- May 22 – Louis IV, King of the Romans, comes to the defense of the Spiritual Franciscans, delivering a sharp criticism of Pope John XXII, whom Louis describes as a heretic.
- June 11 – The Byzantine Empire, represented by diplomatic envoy Stephen Syropoulos, signs a treaty with the Republic of Venice, led by the Doge Giovanni Soranzo.
- June 13 – King Edward II of England dispatches his envoy, Aymer de Valence, 2nd Earl of Pembroke to France in an attempt to negotiate a peaceful end to the Saint-Sardos incident. Stopping at Saint-Riquier 10 days later, Pembroke dies of a heart attack before reaching Paris.
- June 24
  - King Charles IV of France issues an order declaring the Duchy of Aquitaine, French territory ruled by King Edward II of England, forfeited to the crown. The move comes after King Edward fails to render homage, as Duke of Aquitaine, to King Charles. A French army of 7,000 men is massed at the border of Aquitaine for an invasion.
  - Louis IV, King of the Romans, gives the Duchy of Pomerania (part of modern-day Germany and Poland) to his son, Louis, Margrave of Brandenburg, exacerbating the Brandenburg–Pomeranian conflict.

==== July – September ====
- July 5 – A royal wedding takes place in France as King Charles IV marries his cousin Joan of Évreux, the 14-year-old daughter of his uncle, Louis, Count of Évreux.
- July 11 – Pope John XXII declares that Louis IV will be deposed as King of the Romans because of his March 23 excommunication from the Roman Catholic Church. King Louis continues his reign and in the 1325 Treaty of Trausnitz makes his rival, the Habsburg claimant Friedrich, his co-king.
- July 19 – (26 Rajab 724 AH) Mansa Musa, the extraordinarily-wealthy Emperor of Africa's Mali Empire, arrives in Cairo after three days of camping by the pyramids of Giza, and brings with him a large entourage of fellow Muslim pilgrims and a vast supply of gold. Musa, who is making the pilgrimage to Mecca, meets with Egypt's Sultan al-Nasir Muhammad and stays in Cairo for three months before departing with the pilgrims on October 18.
- July 26 – Basarab I, ruler of Wallachia (part of modern-day Romania) is designated by King Charles I of Hungary (Károly Róbert) as a subject of the Hungarian crown.
- August 5 – The Blitar Regency is established on the island of Java (part of modern-day Indonesia) by Java's King Jayanegara of Majapahit.
- August 15 – The coronation of King Christopher II of Denmark (who has ruled since 1320) takes place at Vordingborg, with his son Prince Erik Christoffersen being crowned alongside him as the samkonge, a junior co-monarch.
- August 16 – In Italy, Pagano della Torre, Patriarch of Aquileia, is defeated in battle at Vaprio d'Agogna in Piedmont in his attempt to reclaim Milan from the Visconti family, and abandons further crusades.
- August 25 – War of Metz: In Western Europe, the "Four Lords", King John of Bohemia ("the Blind"), his uncle Baldwin, Archbishop of Trier, Count Edward I, Count of Bar and Frederick IV, Duke of Lorraine ("the Fighter") meet at Remich (in modern-day Luxembourg) and make plans to work jointly on besieging the city of Metz (in modern-day France).
- September 4 – James III of Majorca ("the Unfortunate") becomes the new King of Majorca, a set of islands in the Mediterranean Sea off the coast of Spain, upon the death of his uncle, King Sancho ("the Peaceful").
- September 11 – When the body of King Sancho of Majorca arrives in the French city of Perpignan for interment at the Perpignan Cathedral, a mob attacks the funeral procession and steals valuables that had accompanied the corpse.
- September 15 – War of Metz: The armies of Bohemia, Luxembourg, Bar and Lorraine under the "Four Lords" begin their siege of the walled city of Metz, capital of the Messin Republic. The attackers use a new weapon, the cannon, to fire projectiles at high speed against the city walls in order to destroy the city. The group withdraws at the end of the month after plundering the surrounding area.
- September 22 – The War of Saint-Sardos ends after Charles, Count of Valois, forces the surrender of Edmund of Woodstock, 1st Earl of Kent at La Réole, the last English fortress at the Duchy of Aquitaine. A six-month truce follows

==== October – December ====
- October 7 – (Genko 4, 19th day of 9th month) The Shōchū Incident, the plan by Japan's Emperor Go-Daigo to overthrow the Kamakura shogunate, is discovered by the shogun's security police, the Rokuhara Tandai, and persons involved (other than the Emperor) are arrested and punished.
- October 18 – (28 Shawwal 724 AH) After he and his entourage of Muslim pilgrims have stayed in Cairo for three months, the Emperor Mansa Musa of Africa's Mali Empire resumes the group's pilgrimage to Mecca
- November 3 – At Kilkenny in Ireland, Petronilla de Meath, the maidservant of Dame Alice Kyteler, becomes the first person in the British Isles to be burned at the stake as a witch. Dame Alice had been able to escape before capture.
- November 10 – Pope John XXII issues the papal bull Quia quorundam, his third major statement concerning apostolic poverty and the Fraticelli, in response to a claim that an earlier bull by Pope Nicholas III had implied that Christ and the apostles had lived without possessions. In addition, Pope John restates the doctrine of Papal infallibility, declaring that "What the Roman pontiffs have once defined in faith and morals with the key of knowledge stands so immutably that it is not permitted to a successor to revoke it."
- November 22 – In Italy, Marsilio da Carrara becomes the new Lord of Padua upon the death of his uncle, Jacopo I da Carrara.
- December 25 – The Shōchū era begins in Japan during the reign of the Emperor Go-Daigo.

==== By place ====
====== Asia Minor ======
- Ottoman Sultan Osman I dies after a 25-year reign at Bursa. He is the founder of the Ottoman Empire (first known as a Turkmen principality in the northwest of Anatolia). He is succeeded by his 43-year-old son Orhan I as the second ruler (bey), who places his residence at Söğüt in Bilecik Province (approximate date).

==== By topic ====
====== Literature ======
- Marsilius of Padua writes Defensor pacis ("The Defender of Peace"), a theological treatise arguing against the power of the clergy and in favor of a secular state.

====== Religion ======
- William of Ockham, English Franciscan friar and philosopher, is summoned from Oxford to the papal court at Avignon; either at this time or later he comes into conflict with Pope John XXII and never returns to England.

=== 1325 ===
==== January – March ====
- January 7 – Afonso IV becomes the new King of Portugal upon the death of his father, King Denis I.
- February 1 – Sultan Ghiyath al-Din Tughluq is murdered after a 5-year reign at Kara-Manikpur. He is succeeded by his son Muhammad bin Tughluq (Juna Khan) as ruler of the Delhi Sultanate.
- March 9 – Queen Isabella of England, wife of King Edward II of England and sister of King Charles IV of France, departs from England on a mission to Paris to mediate an end to the war between the two kingdoms. She is directed to return to England by midsummer.
- March 12 – At the age of 11, Valdemar III becomes the new ruler of the Duchy of Schleswig upon the death of his father, Eric II, Duke of Schleswig.
- March 13
  - The Treaty of Trausnitz is signed between the Duchy of Austria and the Kingdom of Bavaria. Austria's ruler, Frederick the Fair, is released from Trausnitz Castle, where he has been imprisoned for two and a half years by Ludwig the Bavarian, King of Germany, since his defeat in the Battle of Mühldorf in 1322.
  - (approximate date) – Tenochtitlan, the predecessor of Mexico City, is founded by the Mexica, led by Tenoch, on an island in Lake Texcoco.
- March 31 – A truce is signed between King Edward II of England (who is also Duke of Aquitaine within France) and King Charles IV of France to end the War of Saint-Sardos. Under terms negotiated by England's Queen Isabella (who is King Edward's wife and King Charles's sister), Edward cedes Agenais (part of modern-day France's Lot-et-Garonne département) and pledges to swear homage to King Charles from then on as a condition of keeping the rest of Aquitaine. England is allowed to reclaim Ponthieu and the Duchy of Gascony if Edward will come to Paris to pay him homage. Isabella, unhappy with her marriage to Edward, remains in France indefinitely.

==== April – June ====
- April 20 – Elizabeth de Comyn, daughter of the late Guardian of Scotland, John Comyn III of Badenoch, is forced to sign away her title to her properties in England at Painswick and at Goodrich Castle to Hugh Despenser the Elder after being kidnapped in 1324 and imprisoned in England at Pirbright.
- May 5 – The Istrian Demarcation, setting out the boundaries of disputed Italian territories in the Adriatic Sea peninsula of Istria (part of the modern-day Republic of Croatia), and confirms the agreement between the independent Italian states of Aquileia, Gorizia, and the Venetian Republic. The document is published in three languages (Latin, German and Croatian).
- May 10 – Pope John XXII issues a papal bull to King Robert of Naples and to Charles, Duke of Calabria demanding the imprisonment of the Fraticelli in Naples and their leader, Fra Enrico da Ceva. The demand, and several subsequent admonitions, is ignored by Robert and Charles.
- May 20 – Led by Michael of Cesena, the Michaelites, a French branch of the Spiritual Franciscans who have been accused of heresy within the Roman Catholic Church in a disagreement over the issue of a vow of poverty, assemble at Lyon in France and agree to make peace with the Church and to make no further disrespectful references to Pope John XXII.
- May 24 – In Germany, Henry II, Lord of Mecklenburg cedes the territories of Prignitz and the Uckermark to the Margraviate of Brandenburg in an unfavorable peace treaty signed at Daber (modern-day Dobra Nowogardzka in Poland).
- June 5 – At Stuttgart in Germany, Ulrich III becomes the new Count of Württemberg upon the death of his father, Eberhard I.
- June 14 – (2 Rajab 725 AH) Ibn Battuta, Moroccan scholar and explorer, sets off from his hometown of Tangier on a hajj, or pilgrimage, to Mecca. En route, he travels to Tlemcen, Béjaïa and Tunis, where he stays for two months. For safety, Ibn Battuta joins a caravan to reduce the risk of being robbed. Underway, he takes a bride in Sfax, but soon leaves her due to a dispute with her father. Traveling more than any other explorer before the modern era, he will travel an estimated 73,000 miles (117,000 km) over the next 30 years, more than twice as much as Zheng He in the 15th century and three times as far as Marco Polo in the 14th century.
- June 22 – Ismail, Sultan of Granada, begins the siege of Martos in the Spanish Kingdom of Castile, but loses control of his troops, who pillage the city after two weeks.

==== July – September ====
- July 8 – (26 Rajab 725 AH) Sultan Ismail I is murdered in his palace, the Alhambra, after a 9-year reign. The attackers are captured and beheaded. Ismail is succeeded by his 10-year-old son Muhammad IV, who becomes the new ruler of the Emirate of Granada. Vizier Muhammad ibn al-Mahruq, serving as wakil (or regent), quarrels for control of the young sultan's government.
- August 7 – Battle of Varey: The 16-year-old Guigues VIII, local ruler (dauphin) of Vienne, defeats the Savoyard forces at Saint-Jean-le-Vieux. During the battle, a Burgundian cavalry charge is repulsed and is forced back to the Savoyard camp. With the assistance of the Varey garrison, Guigues pillages the camp and takes John I, Count of Auxerre, prisoner.
- August 11 – At Valladolid, Alfonso XI reaches the age of 14 and is proclaimed by the Cortes to have full power as the King of Castile.
- September 12 – Edward II is persuaded not to go to France by Hugh Despenser the Elder, his chief adviser. He decides to send his 12-year-old son, Prince Edward of Windsor, to go to Paris and to pay homage instead. Before the young Edward departs, he is bestowed with the title of Count of Ponthieu. Charles IV gives his consent for him to receive the English Aquitaine.
- September 21 – Isabella of France conspires with the exiled Roger Mortimer to have Edward II deposed. To build up diplomatic and military support, Isabella has Edward of Windsor engaged to the 12-year-old Philippa of Hainault. She is the daughter of Count William the Good of Hainaut, who is married to Joan of Valois, granddaughter of the late King Philip III of France.
- September 24 – Edward, Prince of Wales pays homage to King Charles IV of France on behalf of his father, King Edward II of England.

==== October – December ====
- October 10 – King Edward II calls for representatives of the three estates (including the knights representative) to meet at Westminster for a session of the English Parliament, beginning on November 18 to discuss the matter of the failure of his wife, Queen Isabella, to return from France.
- October 18 – King Edward II sends a letter to Pope John XXII (who is in Avignon in France), expressing deep concern for Queen Isabella's failure to return home from Paris.
- November 15 – War of the Bucket: At the Battle of Zappolino in northern Italy, the 7,000-man Ghibelline forces backed by the Holy Roman Empire defeat the much stronger (32,000-men) Guelph army under sent by Pope John XXII near Bologna. After the battle, Ghibelline influence in the region is consolidated.
- November 21 – Yuri III Danilovich, Grand Duke of Moscow, is assassinated by Dmitry of Tver, Grand Duke of Vladimir, nicknamed "the Terrible Eyes". Yuri's younger brother, Iván I Danilovich Kalitá, the Grand Duke of Vladimir, inherits Yuri's throne and relocates the spiritual capital of the Russian people to Moscow by directing the Metropolitan Peter to move his episcopal see from Kiev. The decision of both Ivan and Peter to relocate gradually makes Moscow the political center of Russia.
- December 1 – King Edward II of England makes one final attempt to save his marriage to Queen Isabella, and sends her a letter ordering her to return from France to England immediately, writing that "Oftentimes have we informed you, both before an after the homage, of our great desire to have you with us, and of our grief of heart at your long absence," and adds that he is aware of her affair with Roger Mortimer and that "ceasing from all pretenses, delays and excuses, you come to us with all the haste you can." She declines to come back.
- December 16 – Charles, Count of Valois, uncle of King Charles IV of France and heir apparent to the throne, dies at the age of 55 at Nogent-le-Roi, leaving his son Philip as heir to the throne.

=== 1326 ===
==== January – March ====
- January 21 – The foundation of Oriel College (or King's College), the University of Oxford's fifth oldest (still surviving) college, is confirmed by royal charter.
- February 10–March 11 – The Raid on Brandenburg begins as Polish-Lithuanian forces led by King Wladyslaw the Elbow-High of Poland, and of the Grand Duchy of Lithuania under Gediminas, raid the territories of the Margraviate of Brandenburg (within the Holy Roman Empire), with the sanction of Pope John XXII. Władysław regards the Neumark (East Brandenburg) as Polish territory.
- February 14 – Queen Ingeborg, the regent and de facto ruler of Sweden, is stripped from all political authority. Due to having many debts (known as the Scania affair), she gives up several fiefs.
- February 28 – Frederick the Fair becomes the sole Duke of Austria upon the death of his younger brother, Leopold I of the House of Habsburg.
- March 11 – The Raid on Brandenburg by King Wladyslaw of Poland is completed with the looting and destruction by Lithuanian troops of the cities of Berlin and Frankfurt an der Oder, and the capture of 6,000 German prisoners of war. The area between Frankfurt an der Order and Berlin is looted and devastated.
- March 25 – At Dagnum (a former city in what is now Albania), a peace treaty is signed between Venetian merchants at Ragusa and King Stefan Dečanski of Serbia.

==== April – June ====
- April 6 – Siege of Bursa: Ottoman forces (some 10,000 men) led by Sultan Orhan I capture the Byzantine city of Bursa. Orhan makes Bursa the first official Ottoman capital.
- April 19 – The Peace of Arques, brokered by King Charles IV of France, ends the Flemish Revolt, but the treaty is not supported by rebel districts in Flanders.
- May 4 – King Christopher II of Denmark, forced to flee during an uprising, promises to give the Danish Principality of Rügen to John III of Werle and Henry II, Lord of Mecklenburg, leading to the First War of the Rügen Succession.
- June 3 – The Treaty of Novgorod, a 10-year armistice, ends decades of border skirmishes between Norway and Novgorod in the far-northern region of Finnmark.
- June 6 – In Denmark, the Reichsrat votes to remove King Christopher II from office and to replace him with 11-year-old Valdemar V, Duke of Schleswig. Valdemar's uncle, Count Gerhard of Holstein, becomes the regent for King Valdemar.

==== July – September ====
- July 14 – Wartislaw IV, Duke of Pomerania makes an alliance with Gerhard III, Count of Holstein-Rendsburg, who has taken control of Denmark after overthrowing King Christopher II. Wartislaw IV becomes ill and dies 18 days later.
- July 15 – The Scottish Parliament meets at Cambuskenneth and votes to restore 10-year-old Robert Stewart, grandson of Robert the Bruce to the line of succession to the throne of Scotland. Robert is granted lands in Argyll, Roxburghshire and the Lothians, and will eventually become King of Scotland in 1371.
- July 16 – Moroccan traveler Ibn Battuta departs from Cairo on a trip through Palestine on the way to Damascus.
- August 9 – Ibn Battuta arrives in Damascus after a three-week journey from Cairo.
- August 27 – Queen Isabella of France draws up a marriage contract between the 13-year-old Prince Edward (the future Edward III) and Philippa of Hainault, guaranteeing that the wedding will take place within two years.
- September 15 – Dmitry, Grand Prince of Tver, is executed for the murder of Grand Duke Yuri of Moscow at Sarai on orders of Özbeg Khan, ruler of the Golden Horde that controls much of what is now Asian Russia.

Isabella's campaign (green) and the retreat of Edward II to Wales (brown)

- September 24 – Invasion of England: Isabella of France and her supporters (including Roger Mortimer) land at Orwell in Suffolk. Their aim is to remove King Edward II from his throne and place Prince Edward there as the new ruler. Meanwhile, residing at the Tower of London, Edward tries to raise support in the capital, but instead, there is anarchy in London and mobs killing Edward's officials (including his treasurer, Walter de Stapledon).

==== October – December ====
- October 18 – Isabella of France begins the Siege of Bristol, which is defended by Hugh Despenser the Elder.
- October 26 – After eight days, the castle of Bristol is captured by Queen Isabella, and Hugh Despenser the elder is taken captive. With Bristol secured, Isabella moves her base of operations to Hereford, near the Welsh border. There, she orders Henry of Lancaster to locate and arrest Edward II.
- October 27 – The day after his capture at Bristol, Hugh Despenser the Elder, the chief adviser to King Edward II of England, is dressed in his armor and hanged in public. Afterwards, Hugh's body is dismembered, with his head presented to Queen Isabella to show to others among Edward's allies.
- October 27 – Declaring that they are acting in the name of King Edward and giving as the reason that he is away in France, Queen Isabella and Crown Prince Edward issue a writ summoning the English Parliament to assemble on December 14 at Westminster.
- November 16 – King Edward II of England is captured at Neath Abbey in Wales and brought to England, where he is imprisoned at Kenilworth Castle in Warwickshire.
- December 3 – Queen Isabella and Crown Prince Edward, claiming to act on behalf of King Edward II, issue a new writ postponing the opening of the English Parliament from December 14 to January 7. The new parliament will approve the replacement of King Edward II by the Crown Prince as "Keeper of the Realm".

==== By place ====
====== Europe ======
- Summer – German forces led by Henry II, Lord of Mecklenburg occupy the western territories belonging to the Principality of Rügen. The towns of Barth and Grimmen surrender after a short siege.
- Autumn – Gerhard III, Count of Holstein-Rendsburg allies himself with the Danish magnates. In response, the Hanseatic towns of Demmin, Stralsund, Greifswald and Anklam join the alliance.

====== Middle East ======
- Spring – Ibn Battuta, Moroccan scholar and explorer, arrives after a journey of over 3,500 km (2,200 miles) at the port of Alexandria, at the time part of the Bahri Mamluk Empire.

==== By topic ====
====== Education ======
- Clare College, the University of Cambridge's second oldest (still surviving) college, is founded.

=== 1327 ===
==== January – March ====
- January 13 – In Spain, Marinid Prince Uthman ibn Abi al-Ula, who started an uprising the year before against the Emirate of Granada and its ruler Muhammad IV, arrives at Almería and proceeds to enlist Abu Abdallah Muhammad ibn Abi Sa'id, Muhammad IV's uncle, to be installed as the new Emir, with the name al-Qa'im bi-amr Allah.
- January 20 – Imprisoned at Warwickshire, King Edward II of England is forced to abdicate by his estranged wife, Queen Isabella, and her lover, Roger Mortimer.
- January 25 – The 14-year-old Crown Prince, Edward, is proclaimed King of England in London, with his mother Isabella serving as his regent.
- February 1 – The coronation of King Edward III as ruler of England takes place at Westminster Abbey with the approval of the English Parliament. Walter Reynolds, Archbishop of Canterbury, places the crown upon the new King.
- February 5 – (1st waning of Kason 684 ME, Burmese calendar) In Burma (now Myanmar), Tarabya I becomes the new King of Sagaing, located in northern Myanmar on the Irrawaddy River with a capital in the city of Sagaing. Tarabya succeeds his brother, upon the death of his brother, King Saw Yun, despite the fact that Saw Yun has an heir, Prince Kyaswa.
- February 8 – At Opava (now in the Czech Republic), the Polish Silesian noble Casimir I, Duke of Cieszyn swears homage to the King of Bohemia, John the Blind. In return, Casimir is granted Auschwitz as a fiefdom on February 23.
- February 13
  - King Charles I of Hungary and King John of Bohemia sign an alliance agreement at Nagyszombat in Bohemia (now Trnava in the Republic of Slovakia), to proceed against the Austrian Habsburgs who occupy Pressburg (now Bratislava, capital of Slovakia).
  - In Bavaria, a large fire breaks out in Munich and is not brought under control for two days. One-third of the buildings in the city are destroyed.
- February 19 – Other Silesian nobles follow the example of Casimir of Cieszyn at Opava and swear homage to King John of Bohemia, including the Piast nobles Leszek of Racibórz, Siemowit of Bytom and George of Bytom.
- March 31 – King Charles IV of France makes a peace treaty with England, he returns Aquitaine and Gascony to English rule. Charles receives 50,000 livres and has seized all the English possessions in France. The territories of Limousin, Quercy and Périgord county come under French control.

==== April – June ====
- April 4 – In the civil war in Granada, Prince Uthman ibn Abi al-Ula captures the fortress of Laujar de Andarax (now in the Almeria province of Spain).
- April 5 – Edward II is moved to Berkeley Castle in Gloucestershire. He is kept under the custody of Roger Mortimer's son-in-law, Thomas Berkeley and John Maltravers – who are given £5.00 a day to look after Edward and despite records showing luxury goods being bought for him. Edward is possibly mistreated by his captives.
- April 6 (Good Friday) – Francesco Petrarca, Italian scholar and poet, sees a woman he names Laura (possibly Laura de Noves) in the church of Sainte-Claire d'Avignon, which awakes in him a lasting passion. He writes a series of sonnets and other poems in Italian dedicated to her, which are collected into Il Canzoniere, an influential model for Renaissance culture.
- May 31 – In Milan, Ludwig the Bavarian, King of the Romans, becomes the first King of Italy since 1313, when Henry VII, Holy Roman Emperor had died. Ludwig is enthroned as King Ludovico IV, the third king with that name (Louis the Blind had ruled as Ludovico III from 900 to 905).
- June 21 – Queen Ingeborg of Norway marries the Danish nobleman Canute Porse the Elder, but is deposed from political power in Norway.

==== July – September ====
- July 4 – During a banquet given by Galeazzo I Visconti in Milan, an attempt is apparently made to poison the guest of honor, Ludwig the Bavarian, newly crowned as King of Italy. Galeazzo's brother, Stefano Visconti, becomes ill after tasting food and drink intended for Ludwig and dies suddenly at home. Stefano's brothers Galeazzo, Giovanni, and Luchino, along with his nephew Azzone Visconti, are all imprisoned on orders of the Holy Roman Emperor based on accusations of a fourth brother, Marco Visconti.
- August 25 – Demasq Kaja, Viceroy of Azerbaijan and of Iraq in the Ilkhanate, the Mongol Empire's area of control in the Middle East, is killed in Soltaniyeh after trying to escape arrest on orders of the Ilkhan, Abu Sa'id Bahadur Khan. Abu Sa'id had concluded that Demasq's father, Amir Chūpān, was attempting to take over the Ilkhanate.
- September 21 – Less than a year after his arrest, the former King of England, Edward II, is brutally murdered in Berkeley Castle in Gloucestershire.

==== October – December ====
- October 23 – Pope John XXII condemns Marsilius of Padua's 1324 treatise Defensor pacis (The Defender of Peace). The excommunicated Marsilius flees to Germany and seeks protection at the court of King Louis the Bavarian. John also excommunicates Louis and demands that he relinquishes his claim to the imperial crown.
- October 27 – Elizabeth de Burgh, Queen consort of Scotland as the wife of King Robert the Bruce, is fatally injured when she falls from her horse while traveling with her entourage to Cullen Castle in Banffshire.
- November 5 – At Barcelona, Prince Alfonso the Kind becomes the new King of Aragon upon the death of his father, King Jaime II, and is enthroned as King Alfonso IV.
- December 11 – Simon Mepeham is elected as England's new Archbishop of Canterbury as the candidate of the Earl of Lancaster leader of the regency council. Mepeham defeats the candidate supported by Queen Isabella and Roger Mortimer, and soon works with King Edward III to end Mortimer's power in England.
- December 18 – Pope John XXII appoints 10 new Roman Catholic cardinals, the most during his papacy, including Jacques Fournier, who will succeed Pope John as Pope Benedict XII in 1334.
- December 20 – The late King Edward II of England is buried in the Gloucester Cathedral in Gloucestershire, three months after his death.
- December 22 – Ala ud-Din Timurtash, the Viceroy for Anatolia within the Ilkhanate of the Middle East, and the brother of Demasq Kaja, learns that the Ilkhan Abu Sa'id had arranged for the execution of Demasq. Fearing for his own safety, Timurtash decides to leave and eventually flees to Egypt, but will be executed there on August 12, 1328.

==== By topic ====
====== Literature ======
- Richard of Wallingford, English cleric and abbot, describes the construction of an astronomical clock in his Tractatus Horologii Astronomici.

====== Trade and Transport ======
- In China, the Grand Canal, which runs from Beijing to Hangzhou over a distance of 1,800 km, is completed.

=== 1328 ===
- January 17 – Louis the Bavarian is crowned Emperor at Rome's St. Peter's Basilica. Being excommunicated by the Pope, the ceremony is carried out by three Italian bishops.
- January 24 – Philippa of Hainault marries King Edward III of England a year after his coronation. The marriage produces ten children, the eldest of whom is Edward the Black Prince.
- May 1 – Treaty of Edinburgh–Northampton: England recognises Scotland as an independent nation, after the Wars of Scottish Independence.
- May 12 – Antipope Nicholas V is consecrated at St. Peter's Basilica in Rome by the bishop of Venice.
- May 26 – William of Ockham secretly leaves Avignon, under threat from Pope John XXII.
- May 29 – King Philip VI of France is crowned, founding the House of Valois, after the death of King Charles IV of France, who has no sons to inherit.
- August 23 – Battle of Cassel: French troops stop an uprising of Flemish farmers.
- Undated – The Augustiner-Bräu is first recorded as the brewery of an Augustinian monastery at Munich.

=== 1329 ===
==== January–December ====
- February 1 – King John of Bohemia (of the Teutonic Order) captures Medvėgalis, an important fortress of the pagan Grand Duchy of Lithuania, and baptizes 6,000 of its defenders.
- February 18 – Amda Seyon I, Emperor of Ethiopia, begins his campaigns in the southern Muslim provinces (possibly in 1332).
- March 27 – Pope John XXII condemns some teachings of Meister Eckhart as heretical.
- April – Antipope Nicholas V is excommunicated by Pope John XXII.
- June 6 – Edward III of England pays homage to Philip VI of France for Aquitaine.
- June 7 – David II becomes King of Scots at age 5; he will rule Scotland for nearly 42 years.
- June 10 – Braganstown massacre, County Louth, Ireland: Over 160 are killed.
- June 11 – Battle of Maltepe (Pelekanon): Ottoman Turks defeat the Byzantine Empire.
- August 4 – Wittelsbach possessions are divided by the Treaty of Pavia into those of the Bavarian line and those of Palatinate line. Both lines will be reunited in 1777.

==== Date unknown ====
- Aimone of Savoy becomes Count of Savoy.
- Construction begins on the Archcathedral Basilica of the Assumption of the Blessed Virgin Mary and Saint Andrew in Frombork, Poland.
- Michael of Cesena is deposed as General of the Franciscans.
- Stefan Uroš IV Dušan of Serbia defeats Stephen II, Ban of Bosnia.
- Wiesbaden is granted the right of coinage by Louis IV, Holy Roman Emperor.

== Births ==
1320

- February 9 – Catherine of Austria, German noblewoman (d. 1349)
- April 8 – Peter I the Cruel, king of Portugal (d. 1367)
- May 25 – Toghon Temür (Emperor Huizong), Mongol emperor (d. 1370)
- October 13 – Perenelle Flamel, French female alchemist (d. 1397)
- date unknown
  - Adalbertus Ranconis de Ericinio, Czech philosopher (d. 1388)
  - Averardo de Medici, Italian nobleman (d. 1363)
  - Beatrice of Bourbon, queen consort of Bohemia (d. 1383)
  - Bertrand du Guesclin, Breton knight and general (d. 1380)
  - Blanka of Namur, queen of Norway and Sweden (d.1363)
  - Chen Youliang, Chinese founder of Chen Han (d. 1363)
  - Constantine Harmenopoulos, Byzantine judge (d. 1385)
  - Gabriele Adorno, Genoese nobleman and doge (d. 1383)
  - Galeazzo II, Italian nobleman (House of Visconti) (d. 1378)
  - Isabella, Scottish noblewoman (House of Stuart) (d. 1389)
  - Jan of Czarnków, Polish nobleman and diplomat (d. 1387)
  - John Mohun V, English nobleman and knight (d. 1376)
  - John Twenge, English preacher, canon and prior (d. 1379)
  - Kitabatake Akinobu, Japanese nobleman (kuge) (d. 1380)
  - Lalleshwari (Lal Ded), Indian mystic and poet (d. 1392)
  - Louis I, king of Naples (Capetian House of Anjou) (d. 1362)
  - Michael Panaretos, Byzantine historian and writer (d. 1390)
  - Neil Loring, English knight and diplomat (d. 1386)
  - Nicholas Szécsi, Hungarian nobleman and knight (d. 1387)
  - Nicodemus of Tismana, Byzantine monk and writer (d. 1406)
  - Nijō Yoshimoto, Japanese nobleman and waka poet (d. 1388)
  - Nissim of Gerona, Spanish talmudist and scholar (d. 1380)
  - Otto the Tarantine, German nobleman and prince (d. 1398)
  - Ragibagh Khan (Tianshun), Mongol emperor (d. 1328)
  - Siemowit III, Polish nobleman (House of Piast) (d. 1381)
  - Ugolino Gonzaga, Italian nobleman and knight (d. 1362)
  - Valdemar IV Atterdag, King of Denmark (d.1375)

1321

- January 6 – William de Greystoke, English landowner (d. 1359)
- February 5 – John II, Marquess of Montferrat, Italian nobleman (d. 1372)
- July 5 – Joan of the Tower, queen consort of Scotland (d. 1362)
- August 7 – Bande Nawaz, Indian Sufi scholar and writer (d. 1422)
- August 29 – John of Artois, Count of Eu, French nobleman (d. 1387)
- date unknown
  - Al-Mansur Abu Bakr, Mamluk ruler of Egypt and Syria (d. 1341)
  - He Zhen, Chinese nobleman, general, and politician (d. 1388)
  - James I, Aragonese nobleman (House of Barcelona) (d. 1347)
  - Johann Wittenborg, German merchant and politician (d. 1363)
  - John III of Trebizond ("Megas Komnenos"), Emperor of Trebizond (d. 1362)
  - Louis I of Brzeg ("Louis the Wise"), Polish nobleman from the (House of Piast) (d. 1398)
  - Nicholas, Count of Holstein-Rendsburg, German nobleman and co-ruler (d. 1397)
  - Zhang Shicheng, Chinese rebel leader and ruler (d. 1367)

1322

- January 11 – Emperor Kōmyō of Japan, with the birth name "Prince Yutahito". (d. 1380)
- January 21 – Sin Don, Korean monk and teacher (d. 1371)
- February 12 – John Henry, Bohemian prince and ruler (d. 1375)
- June 24 – Joanna of Brabant, Dutch noblewoman (d. 1406)
- date unknown
  - Agnes of Austria, German princess and ruler (d. 1392)
  - Al-Taftazani, Persian polymath and theologian (d. 1390)
  - Imelda Lambertini, Italian nun and patroness (d. 1333)
  - Michael Asen IV, Bulgarian prince and co-ruler (d. 1355)
  - Nicolas de Besse, French bishop and cardinal (d. 1369)
  - Nicolaus of Luxemburg, Bohemian patriarch (d. 1358)
  - Reynold Grey, English nobleman and peerage (d. 1388)

1324

- March 5 – David II, king of Scotland (Clan Bruce) (d. 1371)
- August 4 – Siraj al-Din al-Bulqini, Egyptian scholar (d. 1403)
- date unknown
  - Bayan Khutugh, Mongol concubine and empress (d. 1365)
  - Catherine of Savoy, Italian noblewoman and ruler (d. 1388)
  - Constance of Sicily, Sicilian princess and regent (d. 1355)
  - Giovanni Manfredi, Italian nobleman and knight (d. 1373)
  - Louis of Durazzo, Italian nobleman and diplomat (d. 1362)
  - Tsunenaga, Japanese prince and heir-apparent (d. 1338)
  - Vettor Pisani, Venetian nobleman and admiral (d. 1380)
  - William the Rich, Marquis of Namur, French nobleman and ruler (d. 1391)

1325

- May 12 – Rupert II, German nobleman and count palatine (d. 1398)
- September 29 – Francesco I da Carrara, Italian nobleman (d. 1393)
- date unknown
  - Abraham Cresques, Majorcan Jewish cartographer (d. 1387)
  - Antonio Pavoni, Italian priest and inquisitor-general (d. 1374)
  - Barnim IV of Pomerania, Polish nobleman and ruler (d. 1365)
  - Ch'oe Mu-sŏn, Korean scientist and military leader (d. 1395)
  - Egidiola Gonzaga, Italian noblewoman and heiress (d. 1377)
  - Eleanor of Sicily, Sicilian noblewoman and queen (d. 1375)
  - Gerhard VI, German nobleman (House of Jülich) (d. 1360)
  - Gidō Shūshin, Japanese monk and spiritual teacher (d. 1388)
  - Henry of Langenstein, German theologian and writer (d. 1397)
  - Inês de Castro, Galician noblewoman and mistress (d. 1355)
  - Johanna I, Italian queen-regnant (House of Anjou) (d. 1382)
  - Margaret the Barefooted, Italian woman and saint (d. 1395)
  - Pandolfo II Malatesta, Italian nobleman and knight (d. 1373)
  - Robert Hales, English Lord Treasurer and admiral (d. 1381)
  - Stephen of Montfaucon, French nobleman and knight (d. 1397)
  - Yongsan, Korean nobleman, prince and heir apparent (d. 1341)
  - Zain al-Din al-'Iraqi, Persian scholar, jurist and writer (d. 1403)

1326

- February 3 – Robert Clavering, English official and politician (d. 1394)
- March 5 – King Louis I of Hungary and Croatia (d. 1382)
- March 30 – Ivan II of Moscow), Russian Grand Prince (d. 1359)
- May 1 – Rinchinbal Khan (Ningzong), Mongol emperor (d. 1332)
- May 8 – Joan I, queen of France (House of Auvergne) (d. 1360)
- June 29 – Murad I, Turkish ruler of the Ottoman Empire (d. 1389)
- August 16 – Amaury IV, French nobleman and knight (d. 1373)
- September 5 – Beatrice of Sicily, Sicilian noblewoman (d. 1365)
- September 15 – Yolande of Bar, French noblewoman (d. 1395)
- November 5 – Anawrahta II, Burmese prince and ruler (d. 1349)
- date unknown
  - As-Salih Ismail, Egyptian nobleman, prince and ruler (d. 1345)
  - Kitabatake Akiyoshi, Japanese nobleman and samurai (d. 1383)
  - Kusunoki Masatsura, Japanese nobleman and samurai (d. 1348)
  - Olivier the Butcher, Breton knight and constable (d. 1407)
  - Imagawa Sadayo, Japanese poet and governor (d. 1420)
  - Isaac ben Sheshet, Spanish Talmudic authority (d. 1408)
  - Ivan Asen IV, Bulgarian nobleman and prince (d. 1349)
  - Manuel Kantakouzenos, Byzantine nobleman (d. 1380)
  - Robert of Durazzo, Italian nobleman and knight (d. 1356)
  - Simeon Uroš, Serbian nobleman and pretender (d. 1370)
  - Tang He (Dingchen), Chinese rebel leader (d. 1395)
  - Wartislaw V, German nobleman and co-ruler (d. 1390)
  - William Wingfield, English official and politician (d. 1398)

1327

- June – Malatesta Ungaro, Italian condottiero (d. 1372)
- October 30 – Andrew, Duke of Calabria (d. 1345)
- date unknown
  - Charles de La Cerda, Franco-Spanish soldier (d. 1354)
  - Elizabeth le Despenser, Baroness Berkeley, English noble (d. 1389)
  - Demetrius I Starshy, Prince of Trubczewsk (d. 1399)
  - Birger Gregersson, Archbishop of Uppsala (d. 1383)
  - Baldus de Ubaldis, Italian jurist (d. 1400)
- probable – William Douglas, 1st Earl of Douglas, Scottish nobleman (d. 1384)

1328

- April 1 – Blanche of France, Duchess of Orléans (d. 1393)
- May 7 – Louis VI the Roman, Duke of Bavaria and Elector of Brandenburg (d. 1365)
- June 25 – William de Montagu, 2nd Earl of Salisbury, English military leader (d. 1397)
- September 29 – Joan of Kent, princess of Wales, spouse of Edward the Black Prince (d. 1385)
- October 9 – King Peter I of Cyprus (d. 1369)
- October 21 – Hongwu Emperor of China (d. 1398)
- November 11 – Roger Mortimer, 2nd Earl of March, English military leader (d. 1360)
- November 25 – Antipope Benedict XIII, born Pedro Martínez de Luna (d. 1423)
- date unknown
  - Archibald Douglas, 3rd Earl of Douglas ("Archibald the Grim", "Black Archibald"), Scottish magnate and warrior (d. 1400)
  - Emperor Go-Murakami of Japan (d. 1368)

1329

- September 26 – Anne of Bavaria, queen consort of Bohemia (d. 1353)
- November 22 – Elisabeth of Meissen, Burgravine consort of Nuremberg (d. 1375)
- November 29 – John I, Duke of Bavaria (d. 1340)
- date unknown
  - Fairuzabadi, Persian Arab lexicographer (d. 1414)
  - Prince Lazar of Serbia (d. 1389)
  - Philip II, Prince of Taranto (d. 1374)
  - Hosokawa Yoriyuki, Japanese samurai (d. 1392)

== Deaths ==
1320

- January 12 – John Dalderby, English bishop and chancellor
- January 21 – Árni Helgason, Icelandic cleric and bishop (b. 1260)
- February 7 – Jan Muskata, Polish bishop and chancellor (b. 1250)
- March 1 – Ayurbarwada Buyantu Khan, Mongol emperor (b. 1285)
- March 21 – Wernher von Homberg, Swiss nobleman and knight
- April 13 – Margaret of Castello, Italian nun and teacher (b. 1287)
- April 24 – Abu Said Faraj, Nasrid advisor and governor (b. 1248)
- May 2 – Joan Butler (Joan FitzGerald), Irish noblewoman (b. 1281)
- May 29 – John VIII, Egyptian pope of the Coptic Orthodox Church
- June 5 – Peter of Aspelt, German priest, chancellor and archbishop
- July 9 – Qutbuddin Mubarak Shah, Indian ruler of the Delhi Sultanate
- July 27 – Heinrich von Plötzke, German knight and marshal (b. 1264)
- October 12 – Michael IX Palaiologos, Byzantine emperor (b. 1277)
- October 31 – Ricold of Monte Croce, Italian missionary and writer
- date unknown
  - Alessandro Novello, Italian bishop and inquisitor (b. 1250)
  - Anna Palaiologina, Byzantine princess and queen consort
  - Antonius Andreas, Spanish monk and theologian (b. 1280)
  - Arnaud d'Aux, French bishop and cardinal-bishop (b. 1270)
  - Bernard Délicieux, French monk, prior and priest (b. 1260)
  - Chosgi Odsir, Mongol monk, translator and writer (b. 1260)
  - Dominic II Rátót, Hungarian nobleman, knight and palatine
  - Geoffrey of Paris, French monk, chronicler and historian
  - Henri de Mondeville, French surgeon and physician
  - Henry II, Margrave of Brandenburg-Stendal ("Henry the Child"), 12, ruler of Brandenburg
  - Ilbasan, Mongol ruler (House of Borjigin)
  - Li Kan (Zhong Bin), Chinese official and painter
  - Mojs II Ákos, Hungarian nobleman and rebel leader
  - Nicholas de Balscote, English judge and chancellor
  - Olivier III de Clisson, Breton nobleman and co-ruler
  - Radulphus Brito, French grammarian and philosopher
  - Robert de Welles, English nobleman and landowner
  - Roger de Mowbray, Scottish nobleman and landowner
  - William III, Burgundian nobleman and knight (b. 1280)
  - Yasa'ur, Mongol nobleman, prince and general (b. 1289)

1321

- January 13 – Bonacossa Borri, Italian noblewoman (b. 1254)
- March 18 – Matthew III Csák, Hungarian nobleman and knight
- April 9 – (The "Four Martyrs of Thane"):
  - Demetrius of Tiflis, Georgian monk and religious leader
  - James of Padua, Italian monk, preacher and missionary
  - Peter of Siena, Italian monk, preacher and missionary
  - Thomas of Tolentino, Italian preacher and missionary
- April 17 – Blanche of Portugal, Portuguese princess (b. 1259)
- April 22 – Bolesław of Oleśnica, Polish nobleman and co-ruler
- April 27 – Nicolò Albertini, Italian friar, cardinal and statesman
- May 31 – Birger Magnusson, king of Sweden (House of Bjälbo)
- July 1 – María de Molina, queen of Castile and León (b. 1265)
- July 23 – Thomas de Berkeley, English nobleman and diplomat
- July 31 – Ibn al-Banna' al-Marrakushi, Almohad mathematician
- August 18 – Rinaldo da Concorezzo, Italian archbishop (b. 1245)
- September 3 – Walter II, Dutch nobleman and co-ruler (b. 1283)
- September 14 – Dante Alighieri, Italian poet and writer (b. 1265)
- October 29 – Stefan Milutin, Serbian king (b. 1253)
- November 9 – Walter Langton, English cleric and bishop (b. 1243)
- November 25 – Nicholas Seagrave, English nobleman and knight
- November 27 – Kunigunde of Bohemia, Czech princess (b. 1265)
- date unknown
  - Bonacossa Borri, Italian noblewoman (House of Visconti)
  - Edmund Butler, Irish Chief Butler, magnate and politician
  - Gregory of Raska, Serbian bishop and translator (b. 1275)
  - Grigorije II of Ras, Serbian monk-scribe, bishop, and saint
  - Guillaume Bélibaste, French preacher and Cathar Perfect
  - James of Lausanne, French superior, theologian and writer
  - Muhammad ibn Rushayd, Almohad scholar, judge, and writer
  - Reginald of Burgundy, French nobleman, knight and co-ruler
  - Sinka Sebesi, Hungarian nobleman, landowner and co-ruler
  - Witte van Haemstede, Dutch nobleman and prince (b. 1281)

1322

- January 3 – Philip the Tall, king of France (b. 1293)
- January 10 – Petrus Aureolus, French philosopher (b. 1280)
- January 12 – Marie of Brabant, queen consort of France (b. 1254)
- February 9 – Philip III, German nobleman and co-ruler (b. 1257)
- March 16 – Humphrey de Bohun, English nobleman (b. 1276)
- March 22 – Thomas of Lancaster, English nobleman (b. 1278)
- March 23 – (Battle of Boroughbridge)
  - John Mowbray, English nobleman and knight (b. 1286)
  - Roger Clifford, English nobleman and knight (b. 1300)
- April 8 – Margaret of Bohemia, Bohemian noblewoman (b. 1296)
- April 14 – Bartholonew Badlesmere, English nobleman (b. 1275)
- April 22
  - Francis of Fabriano, Italian priest and writer (b. 1251)
  - John II, German nobleman, knight and co-ruler (b. 1275)
- June 24 – Matteo I Visconti, Italian nobleman and ruler (b. 1250)
- June 26 – Gilbert Peche, English nobleman, knight and seneschal
- July 22 – Louis I, French nobleman (House of Dampierre) (b. 1272)
- August 10 – John of La Verna, Italian friar and preacher (b. 1259)
- August 25 – Beatrice of Silesia, queen consort of Germany (b.1290)
- September 7 – Henry the Admirable, Duke of Brunswick-Grubenhagen (b. 1267)
- September 17 – Robert III, Flemish nobleman and knight (b. 1249)
- November 1 – Dagi Khatun, Mongol noblewoman and empress
- November 16 – Nasr of Granada, Nasrid prince and ruler (b. 1287)
- December 3 – Maud Chaworth, English noblewoman (b. 1282)
- date unknown
  - Bertha van Heukelom, Dutch noblewoman and heroine
  - Fernando de la Cerda, Spanish prince (infante) (b. 1275)
  - Hugh I, French nobleman (House of Chalon-Arlay) (b. 1288)
  - Hugh of Newcastle, English monk, philosopher and writer
  - Jacob van Oudshoorn, Dutch nobleman and prince-bishop
  - John of Charolais, French nobleman and knight (b. 1283)
  - Lope Díaz de Haro, Spanish nobleman (House of Haro)
  - Ma Duanlin, Chinese encyclopaedist and writer (b. 1245)
  - Matfre Ermengau, French friar, troubadour and theologian
  - Radnashiri, Mongol noblewoman and empress consort
  - Rickard de Bermingham, Anglo-Irish nobleman and knight
  - Stefan Konstantin, Serbian nobleman and king (b. 1283)
  - Theodore Svetoslav, Bulgarian emperor (House of Terter)
  - Theoleptos of Philadelphia, Byzantine mystic and bishop
  - Thomas de Multon, English nobleman, knight and peerage
  - William Inge, English nobleman and Chief Justice (b. 1260)
  - Zhao Mengfu, Chinese teacher and calligrapher (b. 1254)

1323

- January 18 – Catherine of Austria, German noblewoman (b. 1295)
- March 3 – Andrew Harclay, English nobleman and knight (b. 1270)
- March 25 – Mary of Hungary, Hungarian princess and queen (b. 1257)
- April 13 – Joan of Lusignan, French noblewoman and ruler (b. 1260)
- June 11 – Berengar Fredol the Elder, French cardinal and writer
- June 19 – Mechthild of Nassau, German noblewoman and princess
- July 14 – Ralph Greystoke, English nobleman and knight (b. 1299)
- August 2 – Hōjō Nobutoki, Japanese nobleman and regent (b. 1238)
- August 3 – Augustin Kažotić, Croatian prelate and bishop (b. 1260)
- September 4 – Gegeen Khan, Emperor Yingzong of China and Mongol ruler (b. 1302)
- September 22 – Kosmas the Zographite, Bulgarian monk and saint
- October 11 – Henry II the Younger, German nobleman (b. 1292)
- October 16 – Amadeus V, Savoyan nobleman and regent (b. 1252)
- October 28 – John Grey, English nobleman, knight and politician
- November 16 – Frederick the Brave, German nobleman (b. 1257)
- date unknown
  - Benvenuto Campesani, Italian poet, notary and writer (b. 1250)
  - Bernhard II, German nobleman and prince (House of Ascania)
  - Blanche of France, French princess (House of Capet) (b. 1253)
  - Enrique Enríquez the Elder, Castilian nobleman (b. 1246)
  - George II, Bulgarian nobleman and co-ruler (House of Terter)
  - Gerhard IV, German nobleman, knight and co-ruler (b. 1277)
  - Giorgi I, Georgian nobleman and co-ruler (House of Dadiani)
  - Gong of Song, Chinese emperor (House of Zhao) (b. 1271)
  - Guy Ferre the Younger, English nobleman and seneschal
  - Henry III, German nobleman and co-ruler (House of Gorizia)
  - Hervaeus Natalis, French scholar and theologian (b. 1260)
  - Ibn Adjurrum, Moroccan scholar and grammarian (b. 1273)
  - Ibn al-Fuwati, Persian librarian, historian and writer (b. 1244)
  - Isabella of Burgundy, queen consort of Germany (b. 1270)
  - Joan of Taranto, queen consort of Cilician Armenia (b. 1297)
  - John of Monmouth, English bishop and chancellor (b. 1270)
  - Maria dalle Carceri, Italian noblewoman (House of Cornaro)
  - Nicholas Orsini, Italian nobleman, count palatine and ruler
  - Niklot I, Count of Schwerin, German nobleman and ruler (b. 1250)
  - Nisshō, Japanese Buddhist disciple and teacher (b. 1221)
  - Zhongfeng Mingben, Chinese Buddhist master (b. 1263)

1324

- January 8 – Marco Polo, Italian merchant and explorer (b. 1254)
- January 23 – Fulk le Strange, English nobleman and seneschal
- February 11 – Karl von Trier, German knight and Grand Master
- February 26 – Dino Compagni, Italian politician and historian
- March 26 – Marie of Luxembourg, queen of France (b. 1304)
- March 31 – Henry II of Cyprus, king of Jerusalem (b. 1270)
- May 15 – Władysław of Oświęcim, Polish nobleman and ruler
- June 23 – Aymer de Valence, English nobleman and knight
- July 16 – Yohito, former emperor of Japan (b. 1267)
- November 1 – John de Halton, English bishop
- November 3 – Petronilla de Meath, Irish maidservant (b. 1300)
- November 11 – Henry VII, Count of Schwarzburg-Blankenburg, German nobleman and ruler
- November 25 – John Botetourt, English governor and admiral
- December 24 – John III, Dutch nobleman and knight (b. 1275)
- date unknown
  - Domarat Grzymała, Polish bishop (House of Grzymała)
  - Guecellone VII, Italian nobleman (House of Da Camino)
  - Helvig of Holstein, queen consort of Sweden (b. c. 1260)
  - Irene of Brunswick, Byzantine empress consort (b. 1293)
  - Isabella of Ibelin, queen of Cyprus and Jerusalem (b. 1241)
  - Jacopo the Great, Italian nobleman and military leader
  - John II, German nobleman and knight (House of Sponheim)
  - Konoe Iehira, Japanese nobleman (Fujiwara Clan) (b. 1282)
  - Lampert Hermán, Hungarian nobleman and judge royal
  - Nijō Tamefuji, Japanese courtier, poet and writer (b. 1275)
  - Osman I, Ottoman ruler (House of Osman)
  - Ou Shizi, Chinese Confucian scholar and writer (b. 1234)
  - Robert Scales, English nobleman, peerage and politician
  - Sancho I the Peaceful, King of Majorca (b. 1274)
  - Thawun Nge, Burmese nobleman and governor (b. 1260)
  - William Liath de Burgh, Irish nobleman and politician

1325

- January 7 – Denis I, King of Portugal (b. 1261)
- January 20 – John Hastings, English nobleman and ruler (b. 1287)
- March 12 – Eric II, German nobleman (House of Estridsen) (b. 1290)
- March 17 – Gérard de Vuippens, Italian cleric, diplomat and bishop
- March 20 – William Ferrers, English nobleman and knight (b. 1272)
- April 3 – Nizamuddin Auliya, Indian scholar (b. 1238)
- April 5 – Ralph de Monthermer, English nobleman and peerage
- June 5 – Eberhard the Illustrious, Count of Württemberg, German nobleman (b. 1265)
- June 23 – Chungseon of Goryeo (Wang Jang), Korean prince (b. 1275)
- July 6 – John Salmon, English cleric, Lord Chancellor and bishop
- July 8 – Ismail I, Nasrid ruler of the Emirate of Granada (b. 1279)
- September 1 – John Segrave, English nobleman and seneschal
- September 29 – Keizan Jōkin, Japanese Zen Master (b. 1268)
- November 7 – Ichijō Uchitsune, Japanese court noble (b. 1291)
- November 21 – Yuri III Danilovich, Russian Grand Prince (b. 1281)
- December 16 – Charles of Valois, French nobleman (b. 1270)
- December 28 – Al-Allama al-Hilli, Persian theologian (b. 1250)
- date unknown
  - Alice de Toeni, English noblewoman and heiress (b. 1284)
  - Amir Khusrau, Indian musician, poet and scholar (b. 1253)
  - Baybars al-Mansuri, Mamluk historian and writer (b. 1245)
  - Ghiyath al-Din Tughluq, Indian ruler of the Delhi Sultanate
  - Hugh de Audley, English nobleman and knight (b. 1276)
  - Princess Joguk (Borjigin Jintong), Korean princess of Goryeo (b. 1308)
  - Nasir al-Din Shahriyar, Baduspanid nobleman and ruler
  - Nikodim I, Serbian monk-scribe, bishop and archbishop
  - Pierre Le Tessier, French monk, abbot and cardinal-priest
  - Regnaud de La Porte, French cardinal-priest and bishop
  - Richard Willoughby, English landowner, lawyer and judge
  - Robert de Umfavile, English nobleman and knight (b. 1277)
  - Stefan Vladislav II, Serbian nobleman and claimant (b. 1280)
  - Thomas de Dundee, Scottish chaplain, prelate and bishop
  - Vitslav III, Danish nobleman and prince (House of Wizlaw)
  - William de Meones, English cleric, judge and Chief Baron

1326

- January 18 – Robert FitzWalter, English nobleman and knight (b. 1247)
- January 29 – Roger de Beler, English nobleman, justice and politician
- February 28 – Leopold I, Duke of Austria, German nobleman (b. 1290)
- March 26 – Alessandra Giliani, Italian anatomist and scientist (b. 1307)
- April 6 – Pandolfo I Malatesta, Italian nobleman and knight (condottiero)
- May 6 – Bernard of Świdnica, Polish nobleman, knight and ruler (House of Piast)
- May 11 – Mats Kettilmundsson, Swedish knight, statesman and seneschal of the realm (b. c. 1280)
- May 31 – Maurice de Berkeley, English nobleman (b. 1281)
- July 29 – Richard Óg de Burgh, Irish nobleman (House of Burgh) (b. 1259)
- August 3 – Roger Mortimer, English nobleman, knight and judge (b. 1256)
- September 15
  - Dmitry of Tver, Russian nobleman and Grand Prince (b. 1299)
  - William FitzJohn, Irish prelate, archbishop and Lord Chancellor
- October 9 – Reginald I of Guelders, Dutch nobleman, knight and ruler (b. 1255)
- October 14
  - Richard de Stapledon, English nobleman, knight and judge
  - Walter de Stapledon, English nobleman and bishop (b. 1261)
- October 27 – Hugh Despenser the Elder, English chief adviser (b. 1261)
- October 31, Juan de Castilla y Haro ("Juan the One-Eyed"), Spanish nobleman (b. 1293)
- November 17 – Edmund FitzAlan, 9th Earl of Arundel, English nobleman and knight (b. 1285)
- November 24 – Hugh Despenser the Younger, English knight (b. 1286)
- November 25 – Koreyasu, Japanese nobleman and shogun (b. 1264)
- December 28 – David II Strathbogie, Earl of Atholl, Scottish nobleman and constable
- date unknown
  - Alexander of San Elpidio, Italian friar, bishop and writer (b. 1269)
  - Al-Yunini, Syrian religious scholar, historian and writer (b. 1242)
  - Amanieu VII, French nobleman and knight (House of Albret)
  - David of Grodno, Lithuanian nobleman, knight and castellan
  - John Palaiologos, Byzantine nobleman and governor (b. 1288)
  - John Walwayn, English scholar, official and Lord Treasurer
  - Mondino de Liuzzi, Italian physician and anatomist (b. 1270)
  - Ser Petracco, Italian jurist, chancellor and politician (b. 1267)
  - Sheikh Edebali, Ottoman judge and religious leader (b. 1206)
  - William de Braose, Norman nobleman and knight (b. 1260)

1327

- January 16 – Nikephoros Choumnos, Byzantine scholar and statesman (b. 1250 or 1255)
- January 29 – Adolf, Count Palatine of the Rhine (b. 1300)
- March 15 – Albert of Schwarzburg, German grand preceptor of the Knights Hospitaller
- April 9 – Walter Stewart, 6th High Steward of Scotland (b. 1293)
- May 28 – Robert Baldock, Lord Privy Seal and Lord Chancellor of England
- May 29 – Jens Grand, Danish archbishop (b. c. 1260)
- July 4 – Stefano Visconti, Milanese nobleman
- August 25 – Demasq Kaja, Ilkhanate member of the Chobanid Family
- September 1 – Foulques de Villaret, French Grand Master of the Knights Hospitaller
- September 21 – Edward Caernarfon, former King of England (b. 1284)
- September 26 – Cecco d'Ascoli, Italian encyclopaedist, physician and poet (b. 1257)
- October 20 – Teresa d'Entença, Countess of Urgell (b. 1300)
- October 27 – Elizabeth de Burgh, queen of Robert the Bruce
- November – Chupan, Chobanid prince of the Ilkhanate
- November 2 or November 5 – King James II of Aragon (b. 1267)
- December 19 – Agnes of France, Duchess of Burgundy
- date unknown
  - Thomas Cobham, Bishop of Worcester
  - Constantine I of Imereti
  - David of Hrodna, Lithuanian military leader
  - Vital du Four, French theologian (b. 1260)
  - Walter Reynolds, Archbishop of Canterbury
  - Sir Richard de Exeter, Anglo-Irish knight
- probable – Bartholomew of Lucca, Italian historian

1328

- February 1 – King Charles IV of France (b. 1294)
- August 15 – Yesün Temür, emperor of the Yuan dynasty (b. 1293)
- August 23 – Nicolaas Zannekin, Flemish peasant leader (in the battle of Cassel)
- September 26 – Ibn Taymiyyah, Islamic scholar and philosopher of Harran (b. 1263)
- October 12 (or 13) – Clementia of Hungary, Queen consort of France and Navarre (b. 1293)
- November 16 – Prince Hisaaki, Japanese shōgun (b. 1276)
- date unknown
  - Meister Eckhart, German theologian (b. 1260)
  - Andronikos Angelos Palaiologos, Byzantine nobleman and governor (b. ca. 1282)

1329

- January 17 – Saint Roseline, Carthusian nun (b. 1263)
- April 21 – Frederick IV, Duke of Lorraine (b. 1282)
- May 9 – John Drokensford, Bishop of Bath and Wells
- May 31 – Albertino Mussato, Italian statesman and writer (b. 1261)
- June 7 – Robert the Bruce, King of Scotland (b. 1274)
- August 30 – Khutughtu Khan, Emperor Mingzong of Yuan, emperor of the Yuan dynasty and the Mongol Empire (b. 1300)
- October 27 – Mahaut, Countess of Artois (b. 1268)
- date unknown
  - Walter Herok, Bishop of Aberdeen
  - Michael of Imereti
  - Oshin of Korikos, regent of Armenia (assassinated)
  - Edward, Count of Savoy (b. 1284)
  - Maol Íosa IV, Earl of Strathearn
