= 1322 =

1322 in various calendars
- Gregorian calendar: 1322; MCCCXXII
- Ab urbe condita: 2075
- Armenian calendar: 771; ԹՎ ՉՀԱ
- Assyrian calendar: 6072
- Balinese saka calendar: 1243–1244
- Bengali calendar: 728–729
- Berber calendar: 2272
- English Regnal year: 15 Edw. 2 – 16 Edw. 2
- Buddhist calendar: 1866
- Burmese calendar: 684
- Byzantine calendar: 6830–6831
- Chinese calendar: 辛酉年 (Metal Rooster); 4019 or 3812 — to — 壬戌年 (Water Dog); 4020 or 3813
- Coptic calendar: 1038–1039
- Discordian calendar: 2488
- Ethiopian calendar: 1314–1315
- Hebrew calendar: 5082–5083
- Hindu calendars
- Vikram Samvat: 1378–1379
- Shaka Samvat: 1243–1244
- Kali Yuga: 4422–4423
- Holocene calendar: 11322
- Igbo calendar: 322–323
- Iranian calendar: 700–701
- Islamic calendar: 721–722
- Japanese calendar: Genkō 2 (元亨２年)
- Javanese calendar: 1233–1234
- Julian calendar: 1322; MCCCXXII
- Korean calendar: 3655
- Minguo calendar: 590 before ROC 民前590年
- Nanakshahi calendar: −146
- Thai solar calendar: 1864–1865
- Tibetan calendar: ལྕགས་མོ་བྱ་ལོ་ (female Iron-Bird); 1448 or 1067 or 295 — to — ཆུ་ཕོ་ཁྱི་ལོ་ (male Water-Dog); 1449 or 1068 or 296

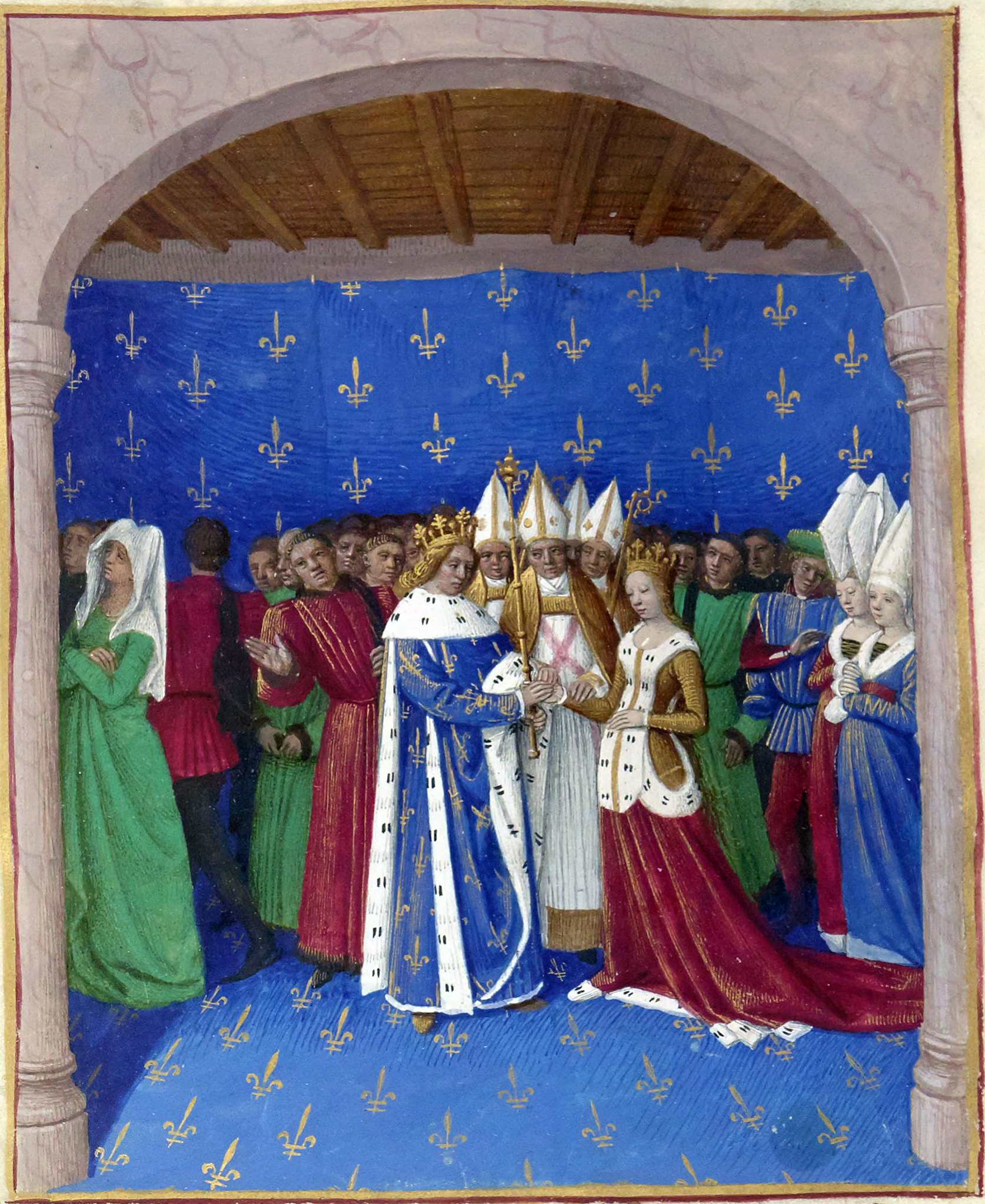
Marriage of Charles IV with Marie of Luxembourg by Jean Fouquet.

Year 1322 (MCCCXXII) was a common year starting on Friday of the Julian calendar.

== Events ==
=== January – March ===
- January 3 – Charles IV the Fair, the last member of the House of Capet and younger brother of King Philip V, becomes the new King of France upon Philip's death at Longchamp Abbey, near Paris. After Charles assumes the throne, he refuses to release his wife Blanche of Burgundy, who is imprisoned for adultery with a Norman knight, from prison, and asks that the marriage be annulled.
- January 6 – Stephen Uroš III Dečanski becomes king of Serbia, having defeated his half-brother Stefan Konstantin in battle. He is crowned by Archbishop Nikodim I, and his 14-year-old son Stefan Dušan becomes co-ruler of Serbia. This is the first coronation for a "young king" in Serbia. Dečanski later grants him the province of Zeta as a fief, indicating his intention for Dušan to be his heir.
- January 12 – Marie of Brabant, queen dowager of France, dies.
- February 13 – The collapse of the central crossing tower of Ely Cathedral in eastern England, possibly as a result of digging foundations for the Lady Chapel, allows the construction of the Octagon that takes its place.
- March 10 – "Despenser War": Battle of Burton Bridge – King Edward II of England orders an attack on the fortified positions of the Contrariant army under his cousin Thomas of Lancaster at Walton-on-Trent in the Midlands. Thomas is heavily outnumbered and decides to withdraw, but is pursued by Edward's troops. He escapes with the remnants of his army to Tutbury Castle and evades Edward's patrols to cross the flooded River Dove. Finally, Thomas makes his way northwards.
- March 16 – "Despenser War": Battle of Boroughbridge – English royal forces (some 4,000 men) led by Andrew Harclay defeat the Contrariant barons at Boroughbridge in Yorkshire. During the battle, Harclay holds the bridge against fierce rebel attacks and Thomas of Lancaster is forced to surrender.
- March 22 – After a show trial at Pontefract Castle, and his conviction by a tribunal for treason against the crown, English rebel Thomas of Lancaster is beheaded in public.

=== April – June ===
- April 14 – Baron Badlesmere, another leader of the unsuccessful Contrariant attempt to overthrow King Edward II of England, is found guilty of treason at a trial in Canterbury. His death sentence is carried out later in the day.
- April 22 – Albert IV becomes the new Duke of Saxe-Lauenburg in Germany upon the death of his father, John II.
- April 30 (1st waning of Kason 684 ME (Burmese calendar)) – Tarabya I becomes the new ruler of the Sagaing Kingdom of Burma after the death of King Saw Yun, according to the Yazawin Thit chronicle.
- May 19 – At the request of King Charles IV of France, Pope John XXII annuls the marriage of Charles and Blanche of Burgundy. Blanche is transferred from prison to Gavray Castle.
- June 24 – In Italy, Galeazzo I Visconti becomes the new Lord of Milan upon the death of his father Matteo I Visconti.
- June 26 – Alice de Lacy, Countess of Lincoln, widow of the Contrariant leader Thomas of Lancaster, surrenders almost all of her properties to King Edward II of England in order to avoid execution.

=== July – September ===
- July 1 – Al-Nasir Muhammad, the Mamluk Sultan of Egypt, asks for aid from the Ikhanate Mongol ruler of Iran, Abu Sa'id Bahadur Khan, for help in modern-day southern Turkey. Al-Nasir has started a campaign against the Armenian Kingdom of Cilicia, led by King Oshin, and Pope John XXII has recently dispatched troops to aid the Armenians. By the time the Ikhanate troops arrive, a ceasefire has been negotiated between the Muslims and the Christians.
- July 6 – In northern Italy, troops of the semi-independent Patriarchate of Aquileia, led by Bishop Pagano della Torre, are routed in a battle at Bassignana against the Duchy of Milan, led by Duke Galeazzo I Visconti.
- July 17 – An agreement is reached in the Byzantine civil war between Emperor Andronikos II and his rebellious grandson, Andronikos III Palaiologos, signed outside the Byzantine fortress of Epibates (modern Selimpaşa in Turkey). The two men agree that they will jointly rule Byzantium as co-Emperors.
- August 1 – Pope John XXII issues a general decree condemning the Fraticelli (Spriritual Franciscans) in the Kingdom of Naples, urging Robert, King of Naples ("the Wise") to suppress the adherents rebelling against Roman Catholic doctrine.
- August 27 (Genkō 2, 16th day of 8th month) – Japanese historian Kokan Shiren completes his work, the Genkyo Shakusho, the oldest existing account of the development of Buddhism in Japan.
- August/September – Battle of Bliska: A coalition of Croatian noblemen (with the support of King Charles I of Hungary) defeats Mladen II Šubić of Bribir, ruler (ban) of Bosnia. After the battle, Mladen is arrested by the Croatian Parliament during an assembly held in Knin Fortress and is taken as a prisoner to the royal court in Hungary on October 8.
- September 17 – Louis Dampierre becomes the new Count of Flanders (the Flemish-speaking half of modern-day Belgium) upon the death of his grandfather, Robert III, "The Lion of Flanders". Louis has become Count of Nevers upon the July 22 death of his father (and Robert's eldest son), Count Louis.
- September 20 – Scotland's King Robert the Bruce begins the "Great Raid" on sites in northern England, leading troops across the River Tweed and starting with an attack on Norham Castle. England's King Edward II responds with an order directing the English Army to assemble at Newcastle upon Tyne to make a counterattack.
- September 21 – King Charles IV the Fair of France marries the 18-year-old Marie of Luxembourg, the eldest daughter of the late Henry VII, Holy Roman Emperor, following the annulment of Charles's marriage to Blanche of Burgundy. Marie dies 18 months later.
- September 28 – Battle of Mühldorf: Bavarian forces (some 2,000 men) led by King Louis the Bavarian defeat the Austrians commanded by his cousin, Frederick the Fair, Duke of Austria and self-proclaimed pretender to the Bavarian throne (or anti-king) at Mühldorf in southern Bavaria. During the battle, Frederick is captured together with his 22-year-old brother, Henry the Friendly (along with 1,000 nobles). Frederick is imprisoned at Trausnitz Castle for two and a half years before his release by the signing of the Treaty of Trausnitz on March 13, 1325.

=== October – December ===
- October 14 – "Great Raid": Battle of Old Byland – Scottish forces led by King Robert the Bruce defeat the English army in Yorkshire. During the battle, Robert and his highlanders charge themselves in a flanking position, from where the English troops are overrun, the most significant Scots victory over the English since Bannockburn in 1314. Edward II narrowly escapes capture and is forced to abandon his personal equipment, silver plate, jewelry and horse trappings. He flees with his retinue to Bridlington.
- November 2
  - Dmitry of Tver, nicknamed "Dmitry of the Fearsome Eyes", Grand Prince of Tver in Russia, becomes the new monarch of the Grand Principality of Vladimir.
  - Scotland's King Robert the Bruce ends his "Great Raid" campaign after six weeks, and withdraws his troops from northern England.
- November 3 – Margaret de Clare, widow of the Contrariant Baron Baldesmere, is freed from incarceration after having spent more than a year as the first woman ever to be imprisoned in the Tower of London (having defied the queen). Margaret retires to a religious life at the convent of the Minorite Sisters (later known as the Poor Clares).
- November 16 – The tiny Spanish emirate of Guadix, created after Nasr was forced to abdicate as Sultan of Granada in 1314, comes to an end upon Nasr's death.
- December 8 – Pope John XXII issues the papal bull Ad conditorem canonum, permanently renouncing the doctrine that the Roman Catholic Church owns all of the properties of the Franciscan Order.
- December 25 – King James II of Aragon marries for the fourth time during his reign, taking as his bride Elisenda de Montcada, in a ceremony in the Spanish city of Tarragona.

=== Approximate date ===
- The Dalmatian House of Keglević (generatio Percal) is mentioned in a document for the first time.

== Births ==
- January 11 – Emperor Kōmyō of Japan, with the birth name "Prince Yutahito". (d. 1380)
- January 21 – Sin Don, Korean monk and teacher (d. 1371)
- February 12 – John Henry, Bohemian prince and ruler (d. 1375)
- June 24 – Joanna of Brabant, Dutch noblewoman (d. 1406)
- date unknown
  - Agnes of Austria, German princess and ruler (d. 1392)
  - Al-Taftazani, Persian polymath and theologian (d. 1390)
  - Imelda Lambertini, Italian nun and patroness (d. 1333)
  - Michael Asen IV, Bulgarian prince and co-ruler (d. 1355)
  - Nicolas de Besse, French bishop and cardinal (d. 1369)
  - Nicolaus of Luxemburg, Bohemian patriarch (d. 1358)
  - Reynold Grey, English nobleman and peerage (d. 1388)

== Deaths ==
- January 3 – Philip V of France "the Tall", king of France (b. c.1291)
- January 10 – Petrus Aureolus, French philosopher (b. 1280)
- January 12 – Marie of Brabant, queen consort of France (b. 1254)
- February 9 – Philip III of Falkenstein, German nobleman and co-ruler (b. 1257)
- March 16 – Humphrey de Bohun, English nobleman (b. 1276)
- March 22 – Thomas of Lancaster, English nobleman (b. 1278)
- March 23 – (Battle of Boroughbridge)
  - John Mowbray, English nobleman and knight (b. 1286)
  - Roger Clifford, English nobleman and knight (b. 1300)
- April 8 – Margaret of Bohemia, Bohemian noblewoman (b. 1296)
- April 14 – Bartholonew Badlesmere, English nobleman (b. 1275)
- April 22
  - Francis of Fabriano, Italian priest and writer (b. 1251)
  - John II, German nobleman, knight and co-ruler (b. 1275)
- June 24 – Matteo I Visconti, Italian nobleman and ruler (b. 1250)
- June 26 – Gilbert Peche, English nobleman, knight and seneschal
- July 22 – Louis I, French nobleman (House of Dampierre) (b. 1272)
- August 10 – John of La Verna, Italian friar and preacher (b. 1259)
- August 25 – Beatrice of Silesia, queen consort of Germany (b. 1290)
- September 7 – Henry the Admirable, Duke of Brunswick-Grubenhagen (b. 1267)
- September 17 – Robert III, Flemish nobleman and knight (b. 1249)
- November 1 – Dagi Khatun, Mongol noblewoman and empress
- November 16 – Nasr of Granada, Nasrid prince and ruler (b. 1287)
- December 3 – Maud Chaworth, English noblewoman (b. 1282)
- date unknown
  - Bertha van Heukelom, Dutch noblewoman and heroine
  - Fernando de la Cerda, Spanish prince (infante) (b. 1275)
  - Hugh I, French nobleman (House of Chalon-Arlay) (b. 1288)
  - Hugh of Newcastle, English monk, philosopher and writer
  - Jacob van Oudshoorn, Dutch nobleman and prince-bishop
  - John of Charolais, French nobleman and knight (b. 1283)
  - Lope Díaz de Haro, Spanish nobleman (House of Haro)
  - Ma Duanlin, Chinese encyclopaedist and writer (b. 1245)
  - Matfre Ermengau, French friar, troubadour and theologian
  - Radnashiri, Mongol noblewoman and empress consort
  - Rickard de Bermingham, Anglo-Irish nobleman and knight
  - Stefan Konstantin, Serbian nobleman and king (b. 1283)
  - Theodore Svetoslav, Bulgarian emperor (House of Terter)
  - Theoleptos of Philadelphia, Byzantine mystic and bishop
  - Thomas de Multon, English nobleman, knight and peerage
  - William Inge, English nobleman and Chief Justice (b. 1260)
  - Zhao Mengfu, Chinese teacher and calligrapher (b. 1254)
