= 1325 =

1325 in various calendars
- Gregorian calendar: 1325; MCCCXXV
- Ab urbe condita: 2078
- Armenian calendar: 774; ԹՎ ՉՀԴ
- Assyrian calendar: 6075
- Balinese saka calendar: 1246–1247
- Bengali calendar: 731–732
- Berber calendar: 2275
- English Regnal year: 18 Edw. 2 – 19 Edw. 2
- Buddhist calendar: 1869
- Burmese calendar: 687
- Byzantine calendar: 6833–6834
- Chinese calendar: 甲子年 (Wood Rat); 4022 or 3815 — to — 乙丑年 (Wood Ox); 4023 or 3816
- Coptic calendar: 1041–1042
- Discordian calendar: 2491
- Ethiopian calendar: 1317–1318
- Hebrew calendar: 5085–5086
- Hindu calendars
- Vikram Samvat: 1381–1382
- Shaka Samvat: 1246–1247
- Kali Yuga: 4425–4426
- Holocene calendar: 11325
- Igbo calendar: 325–326
- Iranian calendar: 703–704
- Islamic calendar: 725–726
- Japanese calendar: Shōchū 2 (正中２年)
- Javanese calendar: 1236–1237
- Julian calendar: 1325; MCCCXXV
- Korean calendar: 3658
- Minguo calendar: 587 before ROC 民前587年
- Nanakshahi calendar: −143
- Thai solar calendar: 1867–1868
- Tibetan calendar: ཤིང་ཕོ་བྱི་བ་ལོ་ (male Wood-Rat); 1451 or 1070 or 298 — to — ཤིང་མོ་གླང་ལོ་ (female Wood-Ox); 1452 or 1071 or 299

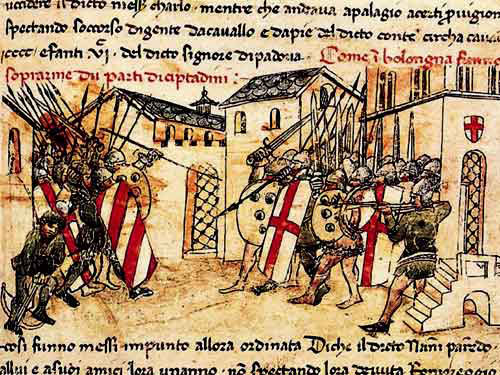
Militias of the Guelphs and Ghibellines factions fight in the comune of Bologna.

Year 1325 (MCCCXXV) was a common year starting on Tuesday of the Julian calendar.

== Events ==
=== January – March ===
- January 7 – Afonso IV becomes the new King of Portugal upon the death of his father, King Denis I.
- February 1 – Sultan Ghiyath al-Din Tughluq is murdered after a 5-year reign at Kara-Manikpur. He is succeeded by his son Muhammad bin Tughluq (Juna Khan) as ruler of the Delhi Sultanate.
- March 9 – Queen Isabella of England, wife of King Edward II of England and sister of King Charles IV of France, departs from England on a mission to Paris to mediate an end to the war between the two kingdoms. She is directed to return to England by midsummer.
- March 12 – At the age of 11, Valdemar III becomes the new ruler of the Duchy of Schleswig upon the death of his father, Eric II, Duke of Schleswig.
- March 13
  - The Treaty of Trausnitz is signed between the Duchy of Austria and the Kingdom of Bavaria. Austria's ruler, Frederick the Fair, is released from Trausnitz Castle, where he has been imprisoned for two and a half years by Ludwig the Bavarian, King of Germany, since his defeat in the Battle of Mühldorf in 1322.
  - (approximate date) – Tenochtitlan, the predecessor of Mexico City, is founded by the Mexica, led by Tenoch, on an island in Lake Texcoco.
- March 31 – A truce is signed between King Edward II of England (who is also Duke of Aquitaine within France) and King Charles IV of France to end the War of Saint-Sardos. Under terms negotiated by England's Queen Isabella (who is King Edward's wife and King Charles's sister), Edward cedes Agenais (part of modern-day France's Lot-et-Garonne département) and pledges to swear homage to King Charles from then on as a condition of keeping the rest of Aquitaine. England is allowed to reclaim Ponthieu and the Duchy of Gascony if Edward will come to Paris to pay him homage. Isabella, unhappy with her marriage to Edward, remains in France indefinitely.

=== April – June ===
- April 20 – Elizabeth de Comyn, daughter of the late Guardian of Scotland, John Comyn III of Badenoch, is forced to sign away her title to her properties in England at Painswick and at Goodrich Castle to Hugh Despenser the Elder after being kidnapped in 1324 and imprisoned in England at Pirbright.
- May 5 – The Istrian Demarcation, setting out the boundaries of disputed Italian territories in the Adriatic Sea peninsula of Istria (part of the modern-day Republic of Croatia), and confirms the agreement between the independent Italian states of Aquileia, Gorizia, and the Venetian Republic. The document is published in three languages (Latin, German and Croatian).
- May 10 – Pope John XXII issues a papal bull to King Robert of Naples and to Charles, Duke of Calabria demanding the imprisonment of the Fraticelli in Naples and their leader, Fra Enrico da Ceva. The demand, and several subsequent admonitions, is ignored by Robert and Charles.
- May 20 – Led by Michael of Cesena, the Michaelites, a French branch of the Spiritual Franciscans who have been accused of heresy within the Roman Catholic Church in a disagreement over the issue of a vow of poverty, assemble at Lyon in France and agree to make peace with the Church and to make no further disrespectful references to Pope John XXII.
- May 24 – In Germany, Henry II, Lord of Mecklenburg cedes the territories of Prignitz and the Uckermark to the Margraviate of Brandenburg in an unfavorable peace treaty signed at Daber (modern-day Dobra Nowogardzka in Poland).
- June 5 – At Stuttgart in Germany, Ulrich III becomes the new Count of Württemberg upon the death of his father, Eberhard I.
- June 14 – (2 Rajab 725 AH) Ibn Battuta, Moroccan scholar and explorer, sets off from his hometown of Tangier on a hajj, or pilgrimage, to Mecca. En route, he travels to Tlemcen, Béjaïa and Tunis, where he stays for two months. For safety, Ibn Battuta joins a caravan to reduce the risk of being robbed. Underway, he takes a bride in Sfax, but soon leaves her due to a dispute with her father. Traveling more than any other explorer before the modern era, he will travel an estimated 73,000 miles (117,000 km) over the next 30 years, more than twice as much as Zheng He in the 15th century and three times as far as Marco Polo in the 14th century.
- June 22 – Ismail, Sultan of Granada, begins the siege of Martos in the Spanish Kingdom of Castile, but loses control of his troops, who pillage the city after two weeks.

=== July – September ===
- July 8 – (26 Rajab 725 AH) Sultan Ismail I is murdered in his palace, the Alhambra, after an 9-year reign. The attackers are captured and beheaded. Ismail is succeeded by his 10-year-old son Muhammad IV, who becomes the new ruler of the Emirate of Granada. Vizier Muhammad ibn al-Mahruq, serving as wakil (or regent), quarrels for control of the young sultan's government.
- August 7 – Battle of Varey: The 16-year-old Guigues VIII, local ruler (dauphin) of Vienne, defeats the Savoyard forces at Saint-Jean-le-Vieux. During the battle, a Burgundian cavalry charge is repulsed and is forced back to the Savoyard camp. With the assistance of the Varey garrison, Guigues pillages the camp and takes John I, Count of Auxerre, prisoner.
- August 11 – At Valladolid, Alfonso XI reaches the age of 14 and is proclaimed by the Cortes to have full power as the King of Castile.
- September 12 – Edward II is persuaded not to go to France by Hugh Despenser the Elder, his chief adviser. He decides to send his 12-year-old son, Prince Edward of Windsor, to go to Paris and to pay homage instead. Before the young Edward departs, he is bestowed with the title of Count of Ponthieu. Charles IV gives his consent for him to receive the English Aquitaine.
- September 21 – Isabella of France conspires with the exiled Roger Mortimer to have Edward II deposed. To build up diplomatic and military support, Isabella has Edward of Windsor engaged to the 12-year-old Philippa of Hainault. She is the daughter of Count William the Good of Hainaut, who is married to Joan of Valois, granddaughter of the late King Philip III of France.
- September 24 – Edward, Prince of Wales pays homage to King Charles IV of France on behalf of his father, King Edward II of England.

=== October – December ===
- October 10 – King Edward II calls for representatives of the three estates (including the knights representative) to meet at Westminster for a session of the English Parliament, beginning on November 18 to discuss the matter of the failure of his wife, Queen Isabella, to return from France.
- October 18 – King Edward II sends a letter to Pope John XXII (who is in Avignon in France), expressing deep concern for Queen Isabella's failure to return home from Paris.
- November 15 – War of the Bucket: At the Battle of Zappolino in northern Italy, the 7,000-man Ghibelline forces backed by the Holy Roman Empire defeat the much stronger (32,000-men) Guelph army under sent by Pope John XXII near Bologna. After the battle, Ghibelline influence in the region is consolidated.
- November 21 – Yuri III Danilovich, Grand Duke of Moscow, is assassinated by Dmitry of Tver, Grand Duke of Vladimir, nicknamed "the Terrible Eyes". Yuri's younger brother, Iván I Danilovich Kalitá, the Grand Duke of Vladimir, inherits Yuri's throne and relocates the spiritual capital of the Russian people to Moscow by directing the Metropolitan Peter to move his episcopal see from Kiev. The decision of both Ivan and Peter to relocate gradually makes Moscow the political center of Russia.
- December 1 – King Edward II of England makes one final attempt to save his marriage to Queen Isabella, and sends her a letter ordering her to return from France to England immediately, writing that "Oftentimes have we informed you, both before an after the homage, of our great desire to have you with us, and of our grief of heart at your long absence," and adds that he is aware of her affair with Roger Mortimer and that "ceasing from all pretenses, delays and excuses, you come to us with all the haste you can." She declines to come back.
- December 16 – Charles, Count of Valois, uncle of King Charles IV of France and heir apparent to the throne, dies at the age of 55 at Nogent-le-Roi, leaving his son Philip as heir to the throne.

== Births ==
- May 12 – Rupert II, German nobleman and count palatine (d. 1398)
- September 29 – Francesco I da Carrara, Italian nobleman (d. 1393)
- date unknown
  - Abraham Cresques, Majorcan Jewish cartographer (d. 1387)
  - Antonio Pavoni, Italian priest and inquisitor-general (d. 1374)
  - Barnim IV of Pomerania, Polish nobleman and ruler (d. 1365)
  - Ch'oe Mu-sŏn, Korean scientist and military leader (d. 1395)
  - Egidiola Gonzaga, Italian noblewoman and heiress (d. 1377)
  - Eleanor of Sicily, Sicilian noblewoman and queen (d. 1375)
  - Gerhard VI, German nobleman (House of Jülich) (d. 1360)
  - Gidō Shūshin, Japanese monk and spiritual teacher (d. 1388)
  - Henry of Langenstein, German theologian and writer (d. 1397)
  - Inês de Castro, Galician noblewoman and mistress (d. 1355)
  - Johanna I, Italian queen-regnant (House of Anjou) (d. 1382)
  - Margaret the Barefooted, Italian woman and saint (d. 1395)
  - Pandolfo II Malatesta, Italian nobleman and knight (d. 1373)
  - Robert Hales, English Lord Treasurer and admiral (d. 1381)
  - Stephen of Montfaucon, French nobleman and knight (d. 1397)
  - Yongsan, Korean nobleman, prince and heir apparent (d. 1341)
  - Zain al-Din al-'Iraqi, Persian scholar, jurist and writer (d. 1403)

== Deaths ==
- January 7 – Denis I, King of Portugal (b. 1261)
- January 20 – John Hastings, English nobleman and ruler (b. 1287)
- March 12 – Eric II, German nobleman (House of Estridsen) (b. 1290)
- March 17 – Gérard de Vuippens, Italian cleric, diplomat and bishop
- March 20 – William Ferrers, English nobleman and knight (b. 1272)
- April 3 – Nizamuddin Auliya, Indian scholar (b. 1238)
- April 5 – Ralph de Monthermer, English nobleman and peerage
- June 5 – Eberhard the Illustrious, Count of Württemberg, German nobleman (b. 1265)
- June 23 – Chungseon of Goryeo (Wang Jang), Korean prince (b. 1275)
- July 6 – John Salmon, English cleric, Lord Chancellor and bishop
- July 8 – Ismail I, Nasrid ruler of the Emirate of Granada (b. 1279)
- September 1 – John Segrave, English nobleman and seneschal
- September 29 – Keizan Jōkin, Japanese Zen Master (b. 1268)
- November 7 – Ichijō Uchitsune, Japanese court noble (b. 1291)
- November 21 – Yuri III Danilovich, Russian Grand Prince (b. 1281)
- December 16 – Charles of Valois, French nobleman (b. 1270)
- December 28 – Al-Allama al-Hilli, Persian theologian (b. 1250)
- date unknown
  - Alice de Toeni, English noblewoman and heiress (b. 1284)
  - Amir Khusrau, Indian musician, poet and scholar (b. 1253)
  - Baybars al-Mansuri, Mamluk historian and writer (b. 1245)
  - Ghiyath al-Din Tughluq, Indian ruler of the Delhi Sultanate
  - Hugh de Audley, English nobleman and knight (b. 1276)
  - Princess Joguk (Borjigin Jintong), Korean princess of Goryeo (b. 1308)
  - Nasir al-Din Shahriyar, Baduspanid nobleman and ruler
  - Nikodim I, Serbian monk-scribe, bishop and archbishop
  - Pierre Le Tessier, French monk, abbot and cardinal-priest
  - Regnaud de La Porte, French cardinal-priest and bishop
  - Richard Willoughby, English landowner, lawyer and judge
  - Robert de Umfavile, English nobleman and knight (b. 1277)
  - Stefan Vladislav II, Serbian nobleman and claimant (b. 1280)
  - Thomas de Dundee, Scottish chaplain, prelate and bishop
  - Vitslav III, Danish nobleman and prince (House of Wizlaw)
  - William de Meones, English cleric, judge and Chief Baron
