= Fermo (disambiguation) =

Fermo is a city in Italy.

Fermo may also refer to:

- Province of Fermo, a province in Italy
- March of Fermo, a frontier territory of the Holy Roman Empire
- John of Fermo an Italian Franciscan friar
