= Kosmas the Zographite =

Kozma Zografski Козма Зографски
- Born: 13th century
- Died: 22 September 1323
- Venerated in: Bulgaria, the Eastern Orthodox world
- Feast: 22 September

Kosmas the Zographite or Kozma Zografski (Bulgarian: Козма Зографски) was a medieval Bulgarian saint venerated in the Eastern Orthodox Church.

Saint Kozma was born in the second half of the 13th century in Tarnovo, the capital of the Bulgarian Empire, to a noble family. He received solid education and was fluent in Greek language. His family wanted to marry him but he desired to become a monk and eventually left for Mount Athos. He went to the Bulgarian Zograf Monastery but eventually retired to a rock cell that he carved himself in the vicinity of the monastery. He lived there as an ascetic until his death on 22 September 1323.

His hagiography was written in Greek and translated into Bulgarian by protohegumen Euthymius in 1802. According to the hagiography, Kozma Zografski was able to see spirits hidden from the sight of men. The feast day of Kozma Zografski is 22 September.

== Sources ==
- Андреев (Andreev), Йордан (Jordan); Лазаров (Lazarov), Иван (Ivan); Павлов (Pavlov), Пламен (Plamen) (2012). Кой кой е в средновековна България [Who is Who in Medieval Bulgaria] (in Bulgarian). Изток Запад (Iztok Zapad). ISBN 978-619-152-012-1.
