= Bertha van Heukelom =

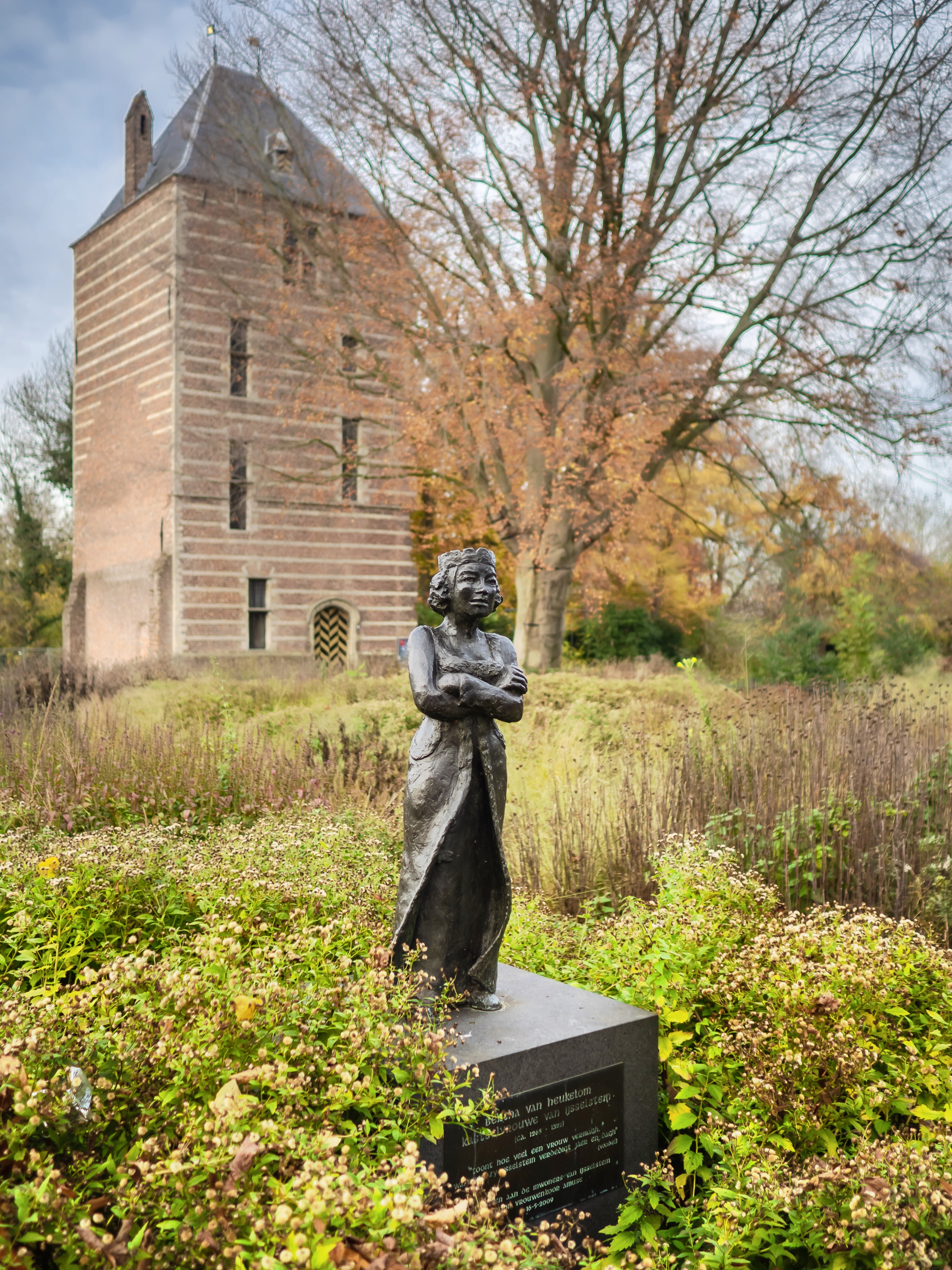
Statue of Bertha van Heukelom in front of the tower of IJsselstein castle

Bertha van Heukelom (died 1322), was a Dutch noble, the legendary heroine of the Siege of IJsselstein Castle in 1296. She was the daughter of Otto I van Arkel lord of Heukelom (fl. 1254-1283) and married around 1280 to Gijsbrecht van IJsselstein (d. 1344).

In 1296, her spouse was imprisoned in Culemborg by Hubrecht van Vianen of Culemborg as a loyalist of the County of Holland, in the then ongoing local feud between Holland and the bishopric of Utrecht. Bertha defended the castle against the siege by Culemborg during the imprisonment of her spouse. Her defense was reported by Melis Stoke in his Rijmkroniek and made her a local heroine.
