= Gilbert Peche =

English noble

- 1st Baron Pecche and Lord of Brunne
- Arms of Gilbert Peche: Argent, a fess between two chevrons gules.
- Born: Suffolk, England
- Died: 26 June 1322; Gloucestershire, England
- Noble family: Pecche Family
- Father: Gilbert Peche
- Mother: Joan de Grey

Gilbert Peche, 1st Baron Pecche and Lord of Brunne, was a 13th—14th century English noble.

== Life ==
Gilbert was a son of Gilbert Peche and Joan de Grey. He served in the Gascon campaign of King Edward I of England and was summoned to parliament as a Baron from 29 December 1299 to 3 November 1306 and again on 14 March 1322. He signed the Barons' Letter of 1301 to and Pope Boniface VIII served as the Seneschal of Gascony from 1316 until 1317. He died in 1322.

== Marriage and issue ==
Peche married Iseult, by whom he had the following known issue:

- Simon Peche (1305–1350) Married with Agnes Holme. Had two children
- Gilbert Peche, 2nd Baron Pecche (1306–1349) Married with Joan Watevile. Had two children

His granddaughter, Katherine Pecche, daughter of his son Gilbert Pecche and Joan Watevile, is a direct ancestor of Oliver Cromwell.

== Ancestry ==
He was the son of Gilbert Pecche and Joan Gray. His mother's ancestry is still unknown, she only knows that she is the daughter of "Simon Greye". His paternal grandfather's mother, Alice FitzWalter, is the daughter of the Lord Walter Fitz Robert, who through him is the descendant of Richard I of Normandy.

Among its ancestral notables are also, Rollo of Normandy, Uhtred the Bold, Baldwin I of Flanders, and the great monarchs, Alfred The Great and Charlemagne.
