= Pierre Le Tessier =

Pierre Le Tessier (b. ca. 1255 – died at the beginning of April 1325) — French churchmen. In his youth he joined the Order of Canons Regular of St. Augustine and in 1318 became abbot of Saint-Sernin, Toulouse. Close advisor of Pope John XXII. Papal nuncio in Sicily in 1317. Vice-Chancellor of the Holy Roman Church from 1319 until his death. In the consistory of 20 December 1320 he was created Cardinal Priest with the title of S. Stefano in Monte Celio. He died at Avignon, at the age of ca. 70.
