= Great Raid of 1322 =

Scottish raid into England

The Great Raid of 1322
- Part of First Scottish War of Independence
Date	30 September – 2 November 1322
Location	Northern England
Result	Scottish success

Belligerents
Kingdom of Scotland	Kingdom of England

Commanders and leaders
Robert the Bruce	Edward II

The Great Raid of 1322 was a major raid carried out by Robert the Bruce, during the First Scottish War of Independence, on Northern England between 30 September and 2 November 1322, resulting in the Battle of Old Byland. Numerous raids began by attacking the area around Carlisle, Holm Cultram Abbey and Northumberland, then eventually crossed over into North Yorkshire, resulting in property being burned and destroyed, valuables from the wealthy and abbeys being stolen, and some residents and livestock being captured and taken back to Scotland.

After the death of Thomas of Lancaster whom Scotland supported as a means to cripple the English in their war against the Scottish during the Despenser War, the Scots in 1322 raided deeper into Northern England to gain his inheritance, reaching as far south as Chorley in Lancashire and the East Riding. They even raided the suburbs of York. A few abbeys, settlements and towns in the path of the raiders, such as Richmond, were spared by bribing them off, however most were not so fortunate. Following the raid, a truce between King Edward II and Robert the Bruce was signed at Bishopthorpe in 1323.
