= Francis of Fabriano =

Italian Roman Catholic professed member from the Order of Friars Minor and writer

Blessed Francesco da Fabriano O.F.M.

Priest
- Born: 2 September 1251; Fabriano, Papal States
- Died: 22 April 1322 (aged 70); Fabriano, Papal States
- Venerated in: Roman Catholic Church
- Beatified: 1 April 1775, Saint Peter's Basilica, Papal States by Pope Pius VI
- Feast: 22 April
- Attributes: Franciscan habit
- Patronage: Fabriano

Francesco da Fabriano (2 September 1251 - 22 April 1322) - born Francesco Venimbeni - was an Italian Roman Catholic professed member from the Order of Friars Minor. He was a noted writer on various theological and biblical matters and was known for his great breadth of theological knowledge that characterized his religious life.

Pope Pius VI beatified the Franciscan friar on 1 April 1775.

== Life ==
Francesco Venimbeni was born in Fabriano in the Papal States on 2 September 1251. His father was a prominent doctor well-loved for his abilities and his love of the poor and ill. Francesco recited the Divine Office in his childhood and knew Latin by the time he turned ten in 1261. In 1268 he knew he would pursue the religious life and his pleased parents consented to this.

He suffered a severe illness in his childhood but healed fast after his mother took him on a pilgrimage to the tomb of Francis of Assisi. It was there that Brother Angelo - an associate of the late Francis - saw him and foretold to his mother that little Francesco would become a Franciscan in the future.

He completed his humanities and philosophical studies before asking for admission into the Order of Friars Minor at their local convent in 1267 where he was under the direction of Father Gartian. While he was a novice in Fabriano, he was allowed to go to Assisi to gain the indulgence of the Porziuncola. There he met Brother Leo, one of the first companions of St. Francis.

Francesco showed himself to be a far-sighted and progressive member of the order with an emphasis on the promotion of theological education. He purchased, through the generosity of his father, a handsome scale of books and other publications for the convent and this was the first on an extended scale established in the order itself. He loved to call it the "best workshop in the convent" and its catalogue - of which Luke Wadding mentioned - contains works of the Church Fathers as well as mathematicians and preachers. There was also works of theological and biblical commentators. Mark of Lisbon dubbed the friar as a "most learned man and renowned preacher".

== Works ==
Little of his spiritual writings has been published and these include:

- Chronica Marchiæ et Fabriani
- De veritate et excellentiâ Indulgentiæ S. Mariæ de Portiuncula
- Opusculum de serie et gestis Ministrorum Generalium

These three particular writings all perhaps formed one extensive chronicle but have disappeared save a few fragments bearing on Franciscan historical accounts. He also published an Ars Prædicantium and numerous sermons as well as one he gave upon the death of Giovanni di Fidanza. His book on the Portiuncula came about when he travelled to Assisi to receive the indulgence; he learned there that Brother Leo - companion of Francis of Assisi - was still alive.

The friar died on 22 April 1322 and had predicted the date of his own death. He is buried in Fabriano.

=== Beatification ===
The beatification for the late friar was celebrated on 1 April 1755 after Pope Pius VI approved the late friar's "cultus" - otherwise known as popular and longstanding devotion.
