= Saint-Jean-le-Vieux, Ain =

Commune in Auvergne-Rhône-Alpes, France

Saint-Jean-le-Vieux
- Commune
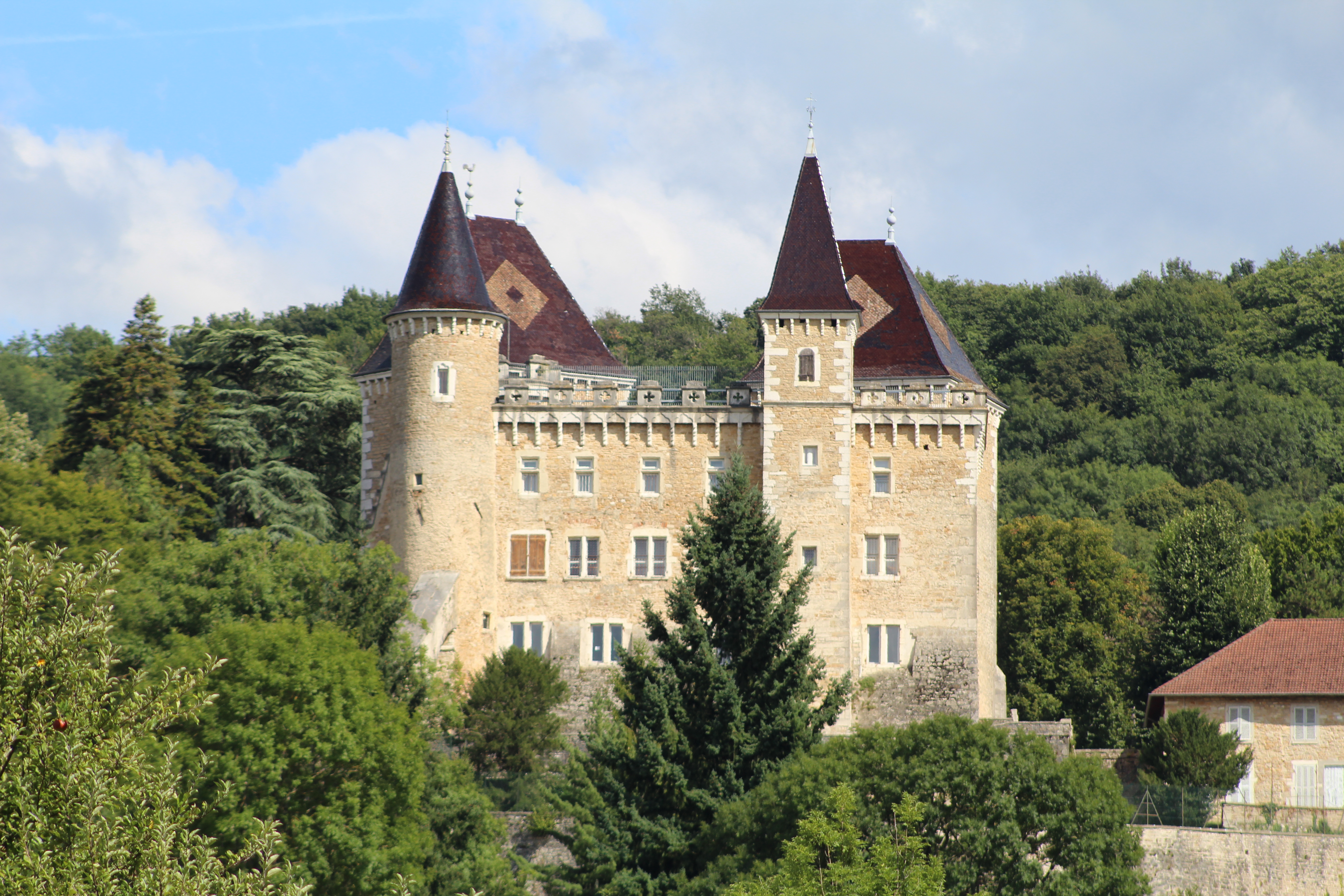
- Château de Varey

- Coat of arms
- Location of Saint-Jean-le-Vieux
- Location within France Location within Auvergne-Rhône-Alpes
- Coordinates: 46°01′46″N 5°23′24″E
- Country: France
- Region: Auvergne-Rhône-Alpes
- Department: Ain
- Arrondissement: Nantua
- Canton: Pont-d'Ain

Government
  - Mayor (2026–32): Bernard Maroquenne
- Area^{1}: 15.2 km^{2} (5.9 sq mi)
- Elevation: 275 m (902 ft)
- Highest elevation: 506 m (1,660 ft)
- Lowest elevation: 236 m (774 ft)
- Population (2023): 1,839
  - Density: 121/km^{2} (313/sq mi)
- Time zone: UTC+01:00 (CET)
  - Summer (DST): UTC+02:00 (CEST)
- INSEE/Postal code: 01363 /01640
- ^{1} French Land Register data, which excludes lakes, ponds, glaciers > 1 km^{2} (0.386 sq mi or 247 acres) and river estuaries.

Saint-Jean-le-Vieux (French pronunciation: [sɛ̃ ʒɑ̃ lə vjø]) is a commune in the Ain department in the Auvergne-Rhône-Alpes region in Eastern France.

== Demographics ==
Historical population
Year	Pop.	±% p.a.
1968	1,083	—
1975	1,024	−0.80%
1982	1,061	+0.51%
1990	1,274	+2.31%
1999	1,450	+1.45%
2007	1,556	+0.89%
2012	1,625	+0.87%
2017	1,723	+1.18%
2023	1,839	+1.09%
Source: INSEE

== See also ==
- Communes of the Ain department
