= Baybars al-Mansuri =

Egyptian mamluk and historian (died 1325)

- بيبرس الدوادار
- Born: 1245
- Died: 4 September 1325 (aged 79–80); Cairo
- Occupations: Historian, soldier
- Era: Bahri Mamluks
- Known for: Chronicle of Mamluk history
- Notable work: Zubdat al-fuṣūl wa-l-ʿuqūd fī taʾrīkh al-duwal wa-l-ʿuhūd, Al-Tuhfa al-mulkīya fī al-daula al-Turkīya

Baybars al-Mansoori (Rukn ad-Dīn Baybars ad-Dawadar al-Manṣūrī al-Khaṭaʾī. d. 1325) was a mamluk (slave soldier) in the service of sultan Al-Mansur Qalawun. He bore the nisba locative surname al-Khit'ai ("from Khitai"), suggesting an origin from the easternmost Muslim lands, possibly Mongol.

He is the author of a historiographical work, known as Zubdat al-fikra fi ta'rīkh al-hijra ("quintessence of thought in Muslim history"). He was purchased from the prince of Mosul in c. 1260 and participated in several of Qalawun's campaigns during the reign of sultan Baibars (d. 1277). In 1284, he was given command of fifty horsemen. In 1287, he was appointed governor of Al Karak, a post which he held until Qalawun's death in 1290.

He was amir al-hajj in 701 AH (1302).

His Zubda is a universal chronicle which ends just prior to his death. A second work, Al-Tuhfa al-mulukiyya fi l-dawla al turkiyya, is based on the Zubda and covers only the Bahri period, 1250–1325. The Zubda is by far the more informative work, but the Tuhfa contains some original content as well. Both works rely heavily on Ibn Abd al-Zahir. Both works were written with the help of the Coptic scribe Ibn Kabar.

== Notes ==
Unknown	Emir of al-Karak; 1287–1290	Unknown
Preceded by Baktamur al-Jawkandar	Emir of the Hajj; 1302	Succeeded by Burlughi al-Ashrafi
