= Margaret the Barefooted =

Italian saint

Saint Margaret the Barefooted
- Born: 1325; San Severino, Italy
- Died: 1395
- Venerated in: Roman Catholic Church
- Feast: August 27
- Patronage: brides, difficult marriages, victims of abuse, widows

Margaret the Barefooted (1325–1395) was born into a poor family in San Severino, Italy. She was married at 15 and abused by her husband for years because of her dedication to the church. She was known for helping the poor and sick and walked barefooted as a beggar to better associate herself with the poor. She died widowed in 1395 of natural causes.
