= Imelda Lambertini =

Patroness of First Communicants

Blessed Imelda Lambertini
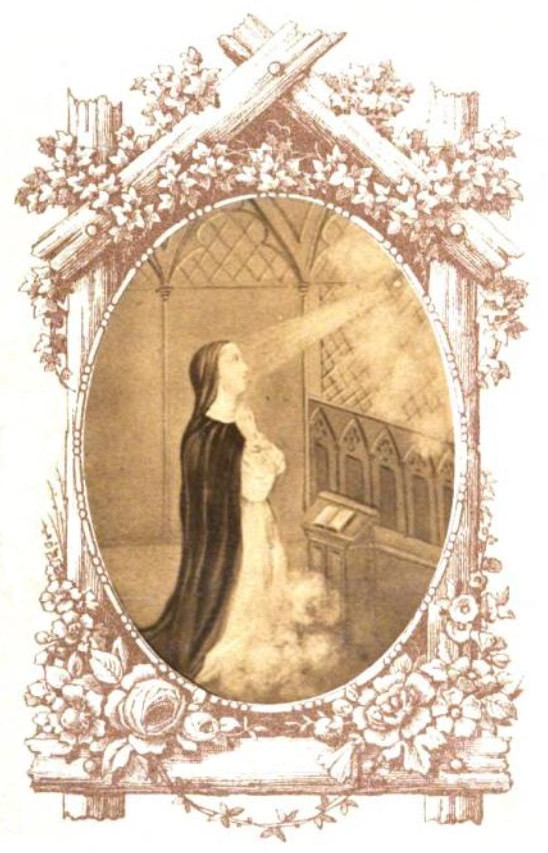

Virgin
- Born: 1322; Bologna, Italy
- Died: 12 May 1333 (age 11); Val di Pietra, Bologna
- Resting place: Bologna, Italy
- Venerated in: Roman Catholic Church
- Beatified: 20 December 1826, Saint Peter's Square, Vatican City by Pope Leo XII
- Major shrine: San Sigismondo Church, Bologna, Italy
- Feast: 13 May
- Attributes: Wearing first communion dress, chapel veil with attached to a chaplet of daisies on her head and rosary.
- Patronage: First Communicants

Imelda Lambertini (1322 – 12 May 1333) was an Italian Catholic mystic and devotee of the Dominican Order. She is the patroness of First Communicants and many dioceses make use of her feast as a day to schedule First Communions and Confirmations.

== Biography ==
Imelda Lambertini was born in 1322 in Bologna, the only child of Count Egano Lambertini and Castora Galuzzi. Her parents were devout Catholics and were known for their charity and generosity to the underprivileged of Bologna. On her fifth birthday, Lambertini requested to receive the Eucharist; however, the custom at the time was that children did not receive their First Communion until age 14. At age nine, she went to live with the Dominican nuns at Val di pietra, near Bologna.

On 12 May 1333, the day of the vigil of the Ascension, Lamborghini was kneeling in church and the "Light of the Host" was reportedly witnessed above her head by the sacristan, who then fetched the priest so he could see. After seeing this, the priest felt compelled to admit Lambertini to receiving the Eucharist. Immediately after receiving it, she went back to her seat, and decided to stay after Mass to pray. Later, when a nun came to get her for supper, she found Lambertini still kneeling with a smile on her face. The nun called her name, but she did not stir, so she lightly tapped her on the shoulder, at which time she collapsed to the floor, dead.

Lambertini's remains are kept in Bologna, at the Church of San Sigismondo. Her cultus has grown so popular that a confraternity for First Communicants has been established in her honor. The last Eucharistic Congress held in Bergamo passed a petition for her canonization.

== Beatification ==
Lambertini's spiritual writings were approved by theologians on 8 June 1891, 13 March 1894, and 19 March 1895. Her cause was formally opened on 11 December 1897, granting her the title of Servant of God.

Lambertini was beatified by Pope Leo XII in 1826.
