= Antonio Pavoni =

Italian Catholic priest (c. 1325–1374)

Blessed Antonio Pavoni O.P.
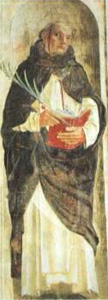
- Painting c. 1400s.

Priest
- Born: c. 1325; Savigliano, Kingdom of Piedmont-Sardinia
- Died: 9 April 1374 (aged 49); Bricherasio, Turin, Kingdom of Piedmont-Sardinia
- Venerated in: Roman Catholic Church
- Beatified: 4 December 1856, Saint Peter's Basilica, Papal States by Pope Pius IX
- Feast: 9 April; 3 February (Dominicans)
- Attributes: Dominican habit; Palm
- Patronage: Finding lost items

Antonio Pavoni, OP (c. 1325 – 9 April 1374) was an Italian Catholic priest and member from the Order of Preachers. He served as an inquisitor-general for Pope Urban V in combatting Waldensians in the Lombard region, but the Waldensians succeeded in killing him in an ambush as he preached an Eastertide homily in 1374.

Pavoni was seen as one killed in hatred of the faith but Pope Gregory XI did not confer formal beatification. Pope Pius IX beatified Pavoni on 4 December 1856 in Saint Peter's Basilica upon the confirmation of the slain priest's local and popular cultus - or veneration.

== Life ==
Antonio Pavoni was born around 1325 in Savigliano and was noted for being a rather pious and intelligent child that set him apart from other children. He joined the Order of Preachers in 1340 at the convent of San Domenico and was later ordained to the priesthood in 1350.

Pavoni received the appointment from Pope Urban V in 1360 as the inquisitor-general for combatting heresies in Genoa and the Lombard region and he was also elected as prior of the Dominican convent at Savigliano in 1368 and again in 1372; as prior he oversaw the construction of an extension to the convent. His methods of preaching and his austere life angered heretics who saw no character flaw in him that could be exploited as a weapon and so conspired to kill the priest.

In 1374 the Bishop of Turin Giovanni da Rivalta asked him to preach there during Lent. He was stabbed to death in an ambush as he preached in Turin the Sunday after Easter on 9 April 1374. His remains were interred at the Dominican convent at Savigliano in 1468 - Aimone Taparelli oversaw the interment - and later moved to the Dominican church at Racconigi in 1827.

=== Beatification ===
In 1375 he was named as one who died "in odium fidei" - in hatred of the faith - but reigning Pope Gregory XI did not preside over his beatification; formal acknowledgement and thus beatification was received under Pope Pius IX on 4 December 1856.
