= John of La Verna =

Italian friar (1259–1322)

Blessed John of La Verna OFM
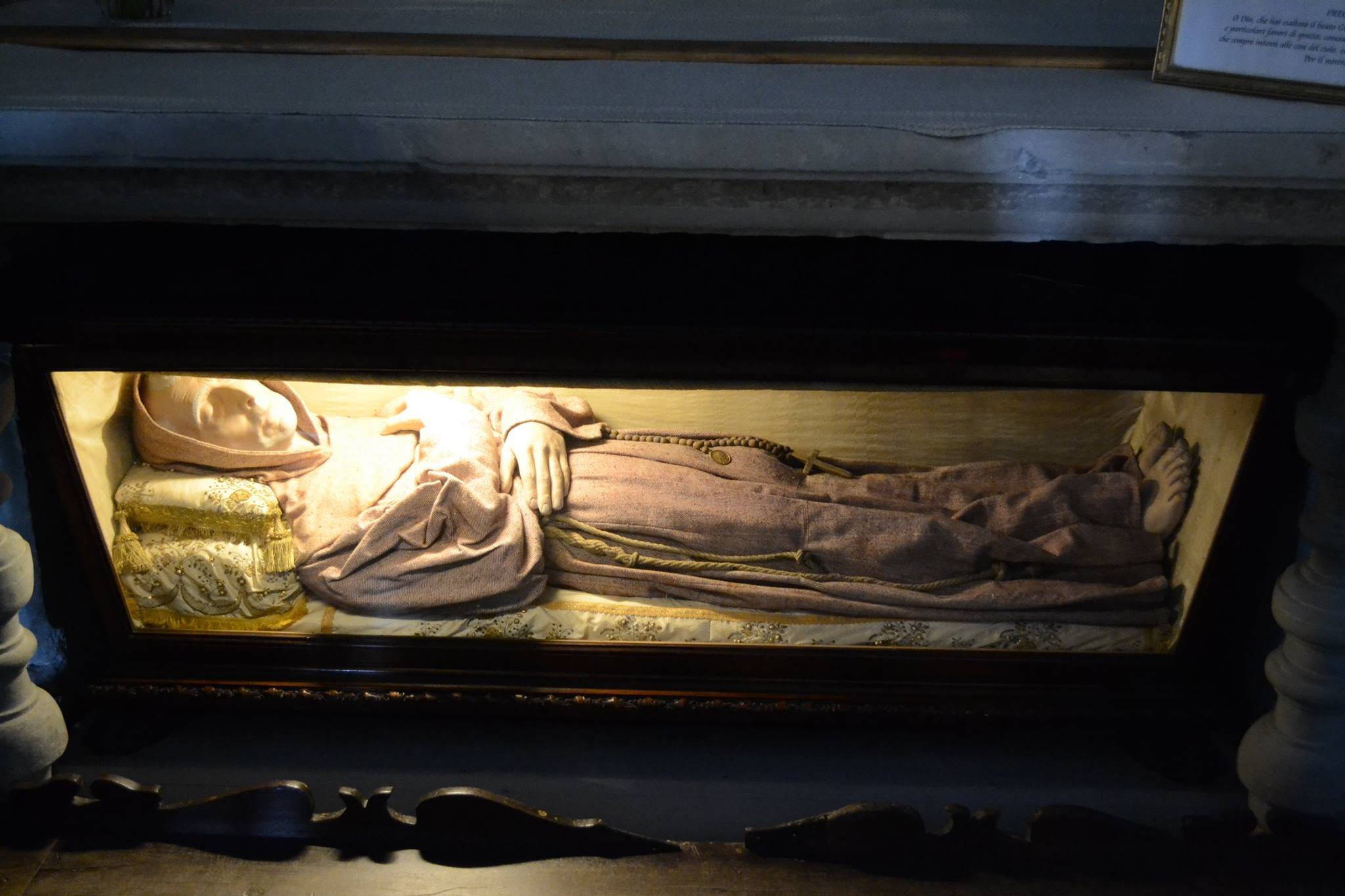

Religious
- Born: 1259; Fermo, March of Ancona, Papal States
- Died: 10 August 1322 (aged 62–63); La Verna, Province of Arezzo, Republic of Florence
- Venerated in: Roman Catholic Church
- Beatified: 24 June 1880 by Pope Leo XIII
- Feast: 9 August

John of Fermo, more often called John of La Verna, from his time spent on that mountain (1259 – 10 August 1322) was an Italian Franciscan friar, who was a noted ascetic and preacher.

== Biography ==
John was born at Fermo in the March of Ancona. After a youth of precocious piety, he was received at the age of ten among the canons regular of the Priory of St. Peter's at Fermo. Three years later, desirous of leading a more austere life, he entered the Order of Friars Minor, where he was influenced by James of Fallerone.

Shortly after his profession, John was sent by the Minister General of the Order to Mount La Verna in Tuscany. There he spent many years in solitude, penance and contemplation, receiving ecstasies and celestial visions.

John's later years, however, were devoted to Christian ministry, and he preached at Florence, Pisa, Siena, Arezzo, Perugia and many other towns of northern and central Italy, where many miracles were attributed to him. He was a close friend of the poet, Jacopone of Todi, and was said to have appeared supernaturally to administer the last rites to him in 1306.

John is said to have composed the Preface which is said in the Mass of St. Francis. Feeling the approach of death at Cortona while on his way to Assisi, John returned to La Verna and died there at the age of 63 in 1322.

== Veneration ==
John was buried on the holy mountain, where many miracles were reportedly wrought through his intercession, and where his cell is still shown. The cultus of John was approved by Pope Leo XIII in 1880.

John's feast day is kept in the Order of Friars Minor on 9 August.
