= 1230s =

Decade

The 1230s was a decade of the Julian Calendar which began on January 1, 1230, and ended on December 31, 1239.

== Events ==
=== 1230 ===
==== By place ====
====== Byzantine Empire ======
- March 9 – Battle of Klokotnitsa: Byzantine forces under Theodore Komnenos Doukas invade Bulgaria, breaking the peace treaty with Tsar Ivan Asen II. Theodore gathers a large army, including western mercenaries. The two armies meet near the village of Klokotnitsa. Ivan applies clever tactics and manages to surround the Byzantines. They are completely defeated; only a small force under Theodore's brother Manuel Doukas manages to escape the battlefield. Theodore is taken prisoner and is blinded. In the aftermath, Ivan quickly extends its control over most of Theodore's domains in Thrace, Macedonia and Albania. The Latin Duchy of Philippopolis and the independent principality of Alexius Slav are also captured and annexed into Bulgaria.

====== Europe ======
- King Alfonso IX of León defeats Ibn Hud al-Yamani (known as Almogàver by the Christians). This success opens the road to Badajoz to the Leonese troops. The Portuguese king Sancho II continues his offensive southward and takes Beja, Juromenha, Serpa and Moura.
- August – Treaty of Ceprano: Emperor Frederick II returns from the Sixth Crusade and signs a peace agreement with Pope Gregory IX at Ceprano. He agrees not to violate any territories held by the Papal States in return for Frederick's concessions in Sicily.
- Frederick II bestows on the Teutonic Order a special privilege for the conquest of Prussia, including Chełmno Land, with papal sovereignty. He allows the Teutonic Knights to forcibly convert the Prussians to Christianity.
- September 24 – Alfonso IX dies after a 42-year reign and is succeeded by his son Ferdinand III. He receives the Kingdom of León, in return for compensation in cash and lands for his half-sisters Sancha and Dulce.
- Siege of Galway: Norman forces under Richard Mór de Burgh invade Connacht and desolate a large portion of the country. He besieges Galway, but is forced to retreat after a week-long inconclusive battle.

====== England ======
- April 30 – English invasion of France: King Henry III embarks from Portsmouth with a large expeditionary force. On May 2, he arrives at Guernsey, and the next day the English army lands at Saint-Malo, where Peter I (de Dreux), duke of Brittany, meets Henry to pay him homage. The English forces march through the County of Anjou, taking the castle of Mirebeau in late July.
- October 27 – Henry III signs a truce with King Louis IX of France ("the Saint") and returns to Portsmouth. He leaves a small force under Peter I and Ranulf de Blondeville, to act against the French in Brittany and Normandy.

====== Middle East ======
- Battle of Yassıçemen: A Seljuk-Ayyubid coalition (some 40,000 men) defeats the Khwarazmians under Sultan Jalal al-Din Mangburni at Erzincan on the Upper Euphrates.

==== By topic ====
====== Literature ======
- The Carmina Burana poetry and song collection is created (approximate date).

=== 1231 ===
==== By place ====
====== Europe ======
- Emperor Frederick II promulgates the Constitutions of Melfi (Liber Augustalis), a collection of laws for Sicily, as well as the Edict of Salerno, regulating the exercise of medicine and separating the professions of physician and apothecary, and requiring medical schools to practice dissection.
- Reconquista:
  - Castillian forces under King Ferdinand III ("the Saint") re-conquer the city of Quesada.
  - Battle of Jerez: Ferdinand III defeats Emir Ibn Hud of the Taifa of Murcia.
- Peter des Roches, Bishop of Winchester, negotiates a 3-year truce between England and France.

====== Britain ======
- Spring – Hubert de Burgh becomes a powerful lord in the Welsh Marches, controlling the castles at Cardigan and Carmarthen. He begins to threaten the local Welsh leaders, Llywelyn the Great launches a campaign against Norman lordship in Wales.
- August 13 – King Henry III orders the sheriffs of Hampshire, Dorsetshire and Wiltshire to give Simon de Montfort the possession of the lands of his father, Simon de Montfort the elder.
- December – Henry III ends his Welsh campaign and makes peace with Llywelyn the Great.
- The University of Cambridge is recognised by a writ of authority over its townspeople from Henry III.

====== Levant ======
- Autumn – Frederick II appoints Marshal Richard Filangieri as his imperial legate, and sends an expeditionary army of mostly Lombards for the defense of Jerusalem. He gathers some 600 knights, 100 "sergeants-at-arms", 700 armed infantrymen, and 3,000 marines. The army is supported by 32 war-galleys.
- War of the Lombards: Richard Filangieri sails for Beirut, where the town is handed over to him. He occupies Sidon and Tyre – while other Lombard forces appear before Acre. At Acre, Filangieri summons a meeting of the High Court and shows letters from Frederick II appointing him as ambassador (baili).

====== China ======
- April 9 – A huge fire breaks out at night in the southeast of Hangzhou during the Song dynasty. Fighting the flames is difficult due to limited visibility. When the fires are extinguished, it is discovered that an entire district of the city (some 10,000 houses) has been consumed by the flames.

====== Mongol Empire ======
- August – Ögedei Khan orders the invasion of Korea. A Mongol army crosses the Yalu River and quickly secures the surrender of the border town of Uiju. The Mongols are joined by Hong Pok-wŏn, a Goryeo general, who takes their side with his subordinates numbering some 1500 families.
- Siege of Kuju: Mongol forces besiege the city of Kuju. They deploy assault teams who man siege towers and scale ladders. Despite the fact the Goryeo army is heavily outnumbered, the garrison refuses to surrender.

==== By topic ====
====== Religion ======
- April 13 – Pope Gregory IX issues Parens scientiarum. The bull assures the independence and self-governance of the University of Paris.

=== 1232 ===
==== By place ====
====== Europe ======
- June 15 – Battle of Agridi: The Cypriot army under King Henry I ("the Fat") defeats the Lombard forces of Emperor Frederick II. After the battle, John of Beirut (supported by funds from Henry), hires 13 Genoese war-galleys to aid in the siege of Kyrenia.
- July 16 – Muhammad I is elected as ruler of the Taifa of Arjona. He revolts against Ibn Hud, the independent ruler of Al-Andalus, and takes control of the city, beginning the foundation of the Nasrid dynasty.

====== England ======
- July 29 – King Henry III dismisses his justiciar (chief justice minister) and regent Hubert de Burgh, and replaces him with the Frenchmen Peter des Roches and Peter de Rivaux, thereby irritating his barons.
- Peter de Rivaux, nephew of Peter des Roches, is made Lord Treasurer of Henry III's household and keeper of the king's wardrobe. This moves him into an important position for controlling the king's affairs.
- The Domus Conversorum ("House of the Converts"), a building and institution in London for Jewish converts to Christianity, is established by Henry III.

====== Africa ======
- The Almohad army besieges the city of Ceuta, where Abu Musa, rebellious brother of Caliph Idris al-Ma'mun, has received shelter and the support of the population. The Genoese rent a part of their fleet to the rebels, who successfully resist the forces of the caliph. The consequences of this revolt are threefold: the city becomes de facto independent from the Almohads, but its reliance on the Italian maritime powers increases, and the Trans-Saharan trade routes begin to shift eastward, due to the local turmoil.

====== Mongol Empire ======
- February 9 – Battle of Sanfengshan: The Mongol army (some 50,000 warriors) defeats the Chinese Jin forces near Yuzhou. General Subutai successfully wipes out the last field army of the Jin dynasty – therefore sealing its fate of falling to the Mongol Empire. During the encounter, also called the Battle of the Three-Peak Mountain, Emperor Aizong of Jin orders the Jin army (some 150,000 men) to intercept the Mongols. The Jin soldiers are constantly harassed by small groups of Mongol cavalry on the way. When they arrive at Sanfeng Mountain, the Jin army is hungry and exhausted by heavy snowfall. The Jin forces are quickly defeated by the Mongols and flee in all directions.
- April 8 – Mongol–Jin War: The Mongol army led by Ögedei Khan and his brother Tolui begins the Siege of Kaifeng (1232), capital of the Chinese Jin dynasty. During the summer, the Jurchens try to end the siege by negotiating a peace treaty, but the assassination of a Mongol embassy makes further talks impossible. While the negotiations are going on, a plague is devastating the population of the city. In the meantime, supplies stored at Kaifeng are running out, and several residents of the city are executed on the suspicion that they are traitors.
- June – Mongol invasion of Korea: Choe Woo, Korean military dictator of Goryeo, orders against the pleas of King Gojong and his senior officials, the royal court, and most of Songdo's population to be moved to Ganghwa Island. Woo starts the construction of strong defenses on Ganghwa Island, which becomes a fortress. The government orders the common people to flee the countryside and take refuge in major cities, mountain citadels, or nearby islands. The Mongols occupy much of northern Korea, but fail to capture Ganghwa Island.
- December 16 – Battle of Cheoin: Korean forces defeat a Mongol attack at Cheoin (modern-day Yongin). The Mongol Empire concludes a peace treaty with Goryeo and withdraws its forces.

====== Japan ======
- August 27 – The Goseibai Shikimoku code of law is promulgated.
- November 17 – Emperor Go-Horikawa abdicates in favor of his 1-year-old son, Shijō, after an 11-year reign. Because he is very young, most of the actual leadership is held by his relatives.

==== By topic ====
====== Literature ======
- The original set of woodblocks of the Tripitaka Koreana is destroyed by fire during the Second Mongol invasion of Korea.

====== Markets ======
- The northern French city of Troyes issues its first recorded life annuities, confirming the trend of consolidation of local public debts initiated in 1218, by the neighboring city of Reims.

====== Religion ======
- May 30 – Anthony of Padua is canonized by Pope Gregory IX at Spoleto, less than a year after his death. He becomes the patron saint of lost items.
- August – Gregory IX is forced to remain in his summer residence at Anagni by Lombard forces from Rome.
- October 29 – Gregory IX orders the Stedinger Crusade to be proclaimed in northern Germany.

=== 1233 ===
==== By place ====
====== Europe ======
- War of the Lombards: Lombard forces at Kyrenia surrender to John of Beirut, after a 10-month siege. The defenders, with their personal belongings, are allowed to retire to Tyre. Captured prisoners are exchanged for those held by Richard Filangieri, commander of the Lombards, at Tyre. Cyprus is wholly restored under the rule of the 16-year-old King Henry I ("the Fat"). His vassals are rewarded, and loans that they have made are repaid.
- August 20 – Oath of Bereg: King Andrew II of Hungary vows to the Holy See that he will not employ Jews and Muslims to administer royal revenues, which causes diplomatic complaints and ecclesiastical censures.
- Winter – Reconquista: King Ferdinand III of Castile ("the Saint") conquers the cities of Trujillo and Úbeda. The Castilian army besieges the city of Peniscola. Ferdinand forces Ibn Hud, ruler of the Taifa of Zaragoza, to sign a truce.

====== England ======
- August – Richard Marshal, 3rd Earl of Pembroke, signs an alliance with Llywelyn the Great, to join forces to revolt against King Henry III. Richard is faced by demands from royal bailiffs in September – where the garrison of Usk Castle is forced to surrender.
- November – Henry III's army camped at Grosmont Castle is attacked in the night, by a force of Welsh and English rebels. Several of Henry's supporters are captured, and the castle is returned to Hubert de Burgh, one of the rebels.

====== Mongol Empire ======
- May 29 – Mongol–Jin War: The Mongol army led by Ögedei Khan captures Kaifeng, capital of the Jin dynasty ('Great Jin'), after the 13-month Siege of Kaifeng (1232). The Mongols plunder the city, while Emperor Aizong of Jin flees for the town of Caizhou. Meanwhile, Ögedei departs and leaves the final conquest to his favoured general, Subutai.
- December – Siege of Caizhou: The Mongols under Ögedei Khan besiege Caizhou and ally themselves with the Chinese Song dynasty to eliminate the Jin Dynasty.

==== By topic ====
====== Cities and Towns ======
- Gendt receives its city rights from Otto II ("the Lame"), count of Guelders (modern Netherlands).

====== Religion ======
- Pope Gregory IX establishes the Papal Inquisition, to regularize the persecution of heresy.

=== 1234 ===
==== By place ====
====== Europe ======
- King Canute II of Sweden ("the Tall") dies after a five-year reign. His rival, Eric XI ("the Lisp and Lame"), returns as ruler of Sweden (possibly after a civil war between the two of them). It is also possible that Canute dies of natural causes, and Eric peacefully then returns as king.
- King Andrew II of Hungary proclaims his son, Coloman of Galicia, as ruler (or ban) of Bosnia, who passes it on to Prijezda, a cousin of Matej Ninoslav, despite Matej being the legitimate ruler.
- Reconquista – King Sancho II of Portugal conquers the cities of Aljustrel and Mértola from the Moors.

====== Mongol Empire ======
- February 9 – Mongol conquest of the Jin dynasty: The Mongol army led by Ögedei Khan captures the Jin capital at Caizhou, after the two-month Siege of Caizhou). Emperor Aizong of Jin abdicates the throne to Wanyan Chenglin, a descendant of the Jin imperial clan. After the Mongol and Song forces have breached the city walls, Aizong tries to escape, but commits suicide to avoid being captured. This marks the end of the Jin dynasty (1115–1234) ('Great Jin') in China.

====== Africa ======
- The Manden region rises against the Kaniaga Kingdom. This is the beginning of a process that will lead to the rise of the Mali Empire.

==== By topic ====
====== Religion ======
- November – Pope Gregory IX proclaims war on the city of Rome after a local revolt forces him into exile. He issues the papal bull Rachel suum videns, calling for a new crusade to the Holy Land.
- Lund Cathedral in Sweden is heavily damaged in a catastrophic fire. Large donations are made to the church, to rebuild the cathedral.

=== 1235 ===
- Connacht in Ireland is finally conquered by the Hiberno-Norman Richard Mór de Burgh; Felim Ua Conchobair is expelled.
- A general inquisition begins in France.
- Siege of Constantinople: The Byzantine emperor John III Doukas Vatatzes and the Bulgarian tsar Ivan Asen II besiege Constantinople in an attempt to take it from its Latin rulers, John of Brienne and Baldwin II. Angelo Sanudo successfully negotiates a two-year truce.
- Elizabeth of Hungary (d. 1231) is canonized by Pope Gregory IX.
- A Chinese text of this year records that Hangzhou City, the capital of the Song dynasty, has various social clubs that include a West Lake Poetry Club, the Buddhist Tea Society, the Physical Fitness Club, the Anglers' Club, the Occult Club, the Young Girls' Chorus, the Exotic Foods Club, the Plants and Fruits Club, the Antique Collectors' Club, the Horse-Lovers' Club, and the Refined Music Society.
- Probable date – Lancaster Royal Grammar School is founded in the north of England.
- Approximate date – Battle of Kirina: Mandinka prince Sundiata Keita defeats Sosso king Soumaoro Kanté, beginning the Mali Empire. By tradition, the Manden Charter, a constitution, is proclaimed in Kouroukan Fouga.

=== 1236 ===
==== By place ====
====== Byzantine Empire ======
- Spring – A fleet consisting of ships from the republics of Venice, Genoa and Pisa arrive at Constantinople. It is headed by Geoffrey II of Villehardouin, ruler of Achaea, who brings 100 of his own knights, 300 cross-bowman, and 500 archers. Geoffrey, formally a vassal of Emperor John I of Constantinople, breaks the blockade of the city, sinks 15 Byzantine ships and enters the Golden Horn. A treaty is signed for two years after the intervention of Angelo Sanudo, duke of Archipelago.

====== Europe ======
- June 20 – Treaty of Kremmen: Duke Wartislaw III recognizes the seignory of Henry Borwin III, lord of Rostock, after his successful expedition against Wartislaw, in which he has conquered Circipania, including the cities of Gnoien and Kalen. Meanwhile, Swietopelk II, Duke of Pomerania ("the Great") conquers Schlawe and Stolp, the eastern part of Pomerania. To ease the tensions with Brandenburg, Wartislaw signs the Kremmen agreement.
- June – The 16-year-old Alexander Nevsky is elected by the Novgorodians as prince (knyaz) of Novgorod, beseeching the young Kievan noble to take charge of the city's military affairs.
- June 29 – Siege of Córdoba: Castilian forces under King Ferdinand III ("the Saint") capture Muslim Córdoba from Emir Ibn Hud, as part of the Reconquista of the Iberian Peninsula.
- July – At a diet (princely convention) in Piacenza, Emperor Frederick II proclaims his wish to recover all Italy for the Holy Roman Empire.
- September 22 – Battle of Saule: The Lithuanians and Semigallians defeat the Livonian Brothers of the Sword, at Šiauliai in Lithuania.

====== England ======
- January 14 – King Henry III marries the 14-year-old Eleanor of Provence, one of the four daughters of Raimond Berenguer, count of Provence. The ceremony takes place at Canterbury Cathedral, while Simon de Montfort, as Lord High Steward, takes care of the banquet and kitchen arrangements. Eleanor is crowned queen at Westminster Abbey shortly afterward.
- A tournament at Tickhill turns into a battle between northerners and southerners, but peace is restored by papal legate Otto of Tonengo.

====== Mongol Empire ======
- The Mongols under Batu Khan, eldest of Jochi, sweep across Central Asia. They settle in the Russian steppe, curtailing the power of the Kievan Rus', extracting tribute from their neighbors, and disrupting their relationship with the Byzantine Empire.
- Autumn – Siege of Bilär: The Mongols under Batu Khan capture the capital city of Bilär after a siege that lasts for 45 days. The Volga Bulgars are defeated within the year, as are the Kipchaks and Alans.
- Mongol–Song War: The Mongols under Ögedei Khan penetrate deep into the Southern Song. The important city of Xiangyang, gateway to the Yangtze plain, capitulates to the Mongols.

====== Asia ======
- October 10 – Razia Sultana, daughter of Mamluk Sultan Shamsuddin Iltutmish, becomes the first female Muslim ruler of the Indian subcontinent, deposing her half-brother, Ruknuddin Firuz, as sultan of the Delhi Sultanate.
- King Kalinga Magha ("the Tyrant") is expelled from Polonnaruwa to Jaffna, capital of the Jaffna Kingdom (located in modern Sri Lanka).

====== Africa ======
- Kouroukan Fouga, the constitution of the Mali Empire, is created by an assembly of nobles of the Mandinka clan.

==== By topic ====
====== Literature ======
- The Goryeo court in Korea orders the preparation of another set of woodblocks for printing the Buddhist Tripiṭaka ("Triple Basket") – which is intended both to gain protection against the Mongol invaders and to replace the earlier 11th century set that has been destroyed by the Mongols (see 1232).

====== Religion ======
- Pope Gregory IX condemns the links that both the Knights Templer and Knights Hospitaller have with the Assassin fighters in the Middle East. He issues a bull (a formal papal proclamation) preventing further contact with the Assassins.
- May 6 – Roger of Wendover, English Benedictine monk and chronicler, dies at St Albans Abbey. His chronicle is continued by Matthew Paris.

=== 1237 ===
==== By place ====
====== Europe ======
- Summer – Emperor Frederick II assembles an expeditionary force (some 15,000 men) to crush the rebellious Lombard League. He crosses the Alps to Verona – where he is joined by Lord Ezzelino III da Romano, including troops from Brescia, Vicenza, Padua and Treviso. Frederick relies on his allies for support and in doing so, he provokes the opposition of earlier supporters, such as the House of Este, which now sides with the Lombards.
- August 15 – Battle of the Puig: Aragonese forces under Bernat Guillem de Montpeller defeat the Muslim army (some 12,000 men) of the Taifa of Valencia at El Puig. The Almohad forces are routed, and many of the soldiers are slain in the action. Zayyan ibn Mardanish, Almohad ruler and governor of Valencia, is forced to go into exile to Tunisia, while offering the surrender of all castles from the Turia River to Tortosa and Teruel.
- November 27 – Battle of Cortenuova: Frederick II defeats the forces of the Lombard League; about 5,000 Lombards are captured. Frederick makes a triumphal entry into the allied city of Cremona in the manner of an ancient Roman emperor, with the captured carroccio (later sent to the commune of Rome), and an elephant. During the winter campaign, Frederick captures the Piedmontese cities of Lodi, Novara, Vercelli, Chieri, and Savona.
- At the urging of King Louis IX of France, Thomas II marries Joanna, widow of Ferdinand of Flanders, and daughter of the late Latin Emperor Baldwin I. Thomas becomes count of Flanders (or Jure uxoris).
- Livonian Crusade: The Livonian Brothers of the Sword are absorbed into the Teutonic Order, as the autonomous Livonian Order. An Estonian rebellion begins on Saaremaa Island (located in the Baltic Sea).

====== England ======
- September 25 – Treaty of York: King Henry III signs an agreement with Alexander II of Scotland at York. Alexander subjects to Henry's sovereignty and renounces the Scottish claims to Northumberland, Westmorland and Cumberland. This establishes the Anglo-Scottish border in a form with the future status of several feudal properties and marks the end of Scotland's attempts to extend its frontier southward.

====== Mongol Empire ======
- Autumn – Mongol invasion of Kievan Rus': The Mongol army commanded by Batu Khan and Subutai, invades the Principality of Ryazan (with representatives of all four khanates leading some 100,000 Mongol, Turks and Persian forces into Europe). In December, Batu Khan sends envoys to the Rus' court of Grand Prince Yuri Igorevich and demands the submission of the capital Ryazan.
- Battle of Voronezh River: Grand Prince Yuri II of Vladimir supported by border princes of Ryazan, Murom, and Pronsk gathers his forces and make a stand on the Voronezh River, waiting for reinforcements from Vladimir. The Mongols under Batu Khan overrun the Rus' forces, who are scattered. Yuri retreats to Ryazan, while some troops withdraw to Kolomna and join the army of Vladimir-Suzdal.
- December 16–21 – Siege of Ryazan: The Mongols under Batu Khan lay siege to Ryazan. The townspeople repel the first Mongol attacks but after 5 days the city walls are breached by Chinese catapults. On December 21, the Mongols storm the walls and plunder the capital, killing Yuri Igorevich and all inhabitants. Yuri II of Vladimir stands by and does nothing to intervene while Ryazan burns.
- December – Siege of Kolomna: Rus' forces under Yuri II of Vladimir are besieged and annihilated at Kolomna by the Mongols. Yuri barely escapes to Yaroslavl. The defenceless capital of Vladimir is taken after just 2 days. Yuri's wife Agatha (sister of Michael of Chernigov) and all his family die in Vladimir when a church where they have sought refuge from the fire collapses.

====== Levant ======
- Spring – Al-Ashraf Musa, Ayyubid ruler of Damascus, assembles his allies and secures his active support of Kayqubad I, Sejuk ruler of the Sultanate of Rum. A civil war seems inevitable when Kayqubad is poisoned during a feast at Kayseri, on May 31. Meanwhile, the Seljuks strengthen the fortresses in the eastern provinces against the Mongols.
- August 27 – Al-Ashraf becomes dangerously ill and dies after an 8-year reign. He is succeeded by his brother As-Salih Ismail – who defends Damascus against his elder brother Al-Kamil, Ayyubid ruler of Egypt. In October, Ismail has the suburbs burnt to prevent the Egyptian forces from shelter.

==== By topic ====
====== Cities and Towns ======
In England the central tower of Lincoln Cathedral collapses.

- Cölln, twin city of the later built Alt-Berlin, is founded on the Fischerinsel. The town becomes a trade center, which is linked with Magdeburg and Frankfurt an der Oder.
- Elbląg is founded by the Teutonic Order under Grand Master Hermann von Balk. He constructs a fortified stronghold on the banks of the Elbląg River (modern Poland).

=== 1238 ===
==== By place ====
====== Mongol Empire ======
- January 15–20 – Siege of Moscow: The Mongols under Batu Khan and Subutai campaign across the northern heartland of the Kievan Rus', committing numerous atrocities across multiple settlements, including the sacking of an insignificant town known as Moscow. According to the Chronicle of Novgorod, Moscow is a fortified village, a trading post "on a crossroads of four rivers". The village is taken by the Mongols after 5 days of siege.
- March 4 – Battle of the Sit River: The Mongols defeat a Kievan Rus' army (some 4,000 men) under Grand Prince Yuri II of Vladimir in an engagement at the Sit River (located in the Sonkovsky District). With Yuri's death, so too dies the hope of any united Rus' resistance against the Mongols. Batu Khan splits his forces up into several contingents – ordering each to wreak havoc across the Rus' territories (modern-day Russia and Ukraine).
- March – Siege of Kozelsk: The 12-year-old Prince Vasily of Chernigov (grandson of Mstislav II Svyatoslavich), manages against all the odds, to hold out in his capital of Kozelsk for nearly two months with only citizen militia. He leads a successful sortie outside of the walls – where the garrison slaughters thousands of Mongols and destroys siege equipment. Finally, Kozelsk is conquered and Vasily is slaughtered alongside the inhabitants.
- Evpaty Kolovrat, Kievan knight (bogatyr), returns to his hometown of Ryazan, which was burnt to the ground by the Mongols in 1237. He gathers some 1,700 survivors and pursues Batu Khan, attacking his rearguard, and annihilating thousands of Mongols. Finally, Kolovrat is slain from afar by siege-weaponry. Batu Khan shows admiration for his bravery and as a sign of respect, returns his body and allows his soldiers to return home.
- Autumn – The Mongols under Batu Khan retire, leaving behind the ruined northern Rus' territories. He spends the rest of the year suppressing the last resistance of the Kipchaks, while his cousin Möngke (son of Tolui Khan) conquer the Alans and the northern Caucasian tribes. Later, Möngke makes a raid of reconnaissance as far as Kiev.

====== Europe ======
- June 8 – Treaty of Stensby: The Teutonic Knights sign an agreement with King Valdemar II of Denmark ("the Conqueror"). William of Modena, Italian papal diplomat, meets Grand Master Hermann Balk and Valdemar on a Danish island, settling outstanding disputes with Denmark. The Livonian Brothers of the Sword are merged into the Teutonic Order as an autonomous branch and become known as the Livonian Order.
- July 11 – Siege of Brescia: Emperor Frederick II begins the siege of Brescia. He rejects the negotiations of the Lombard League and insists on unconditional surrender to the imperial forces in northern Italy. This blocks all possibilities of a peaceful settlement. Milan and five other Lombard cities are attacked. In early October, after a successful sortie by the city's defenders, Frederick is forced to lift the siege.
- August 21 – Battle of Örlygsstaðir: Chieftain Sighvatr Sturluson and his son, Sturla Sighvatsson, are defeated by Kolbeinn ungi Arnórsson and Gissur Þorvaldsson, for control of Iceland (known as the Age of the Sturlungs).
- September 28 – King James I of Aragon captures the city of Valencia from the Moors, who retreat to Granada. During the campaign, James' cousin, Bernat Guillem de Montpeller, dies from wounds received in action.
- Autumn – Muhammad I, Almohad ruler of the Emirate of Granada, begins the construction of the Alhambra Complex on the site of a pre-Islamic fortress.

====== England ======
- January – Simon de Montfort marries the 23-year-old Eleanor, sister of King Henry III. While the marriage takes place with the king's approval, the act itself is performed secretly and without consulting the barons. Eleanor has previously been married to William Marshal and has sworn a vow of perpetual chastity upon his death, which she breaks by marrying Montfort. Archbishop Edmund of Abingdon condemns the marriage for this reason.

====== Middle East ======
- March 6 – Al-Kamil, Ayyubid ruler of Egypt, dies at Damascus and is succeeded by his 18-year-old son Al-Adil II. After Al-Kamil's death, a civil war breaks out, and his elder son As-Salih Ayyub, sets out from Damascus to invade Egypt. But a sudden coup d'état dethrones him in favour of his uncle, As-Salih Ismail.
- The Nizari Imam Muhammad III and the Abbasid caliph Al-Mustansir send a joint diplomatic mission to the European kings Louis IX of France and Henry III of England to forge a Muslim–Christian alliance against the Mongols, but this is unsuccessful.

=== 1239 ===
==== By place ====
====== Europe ======
- Summer – A German expeditionary force under Frederick II, Holy Roman Emperor, invades the Romagna and Tuscany, hoping to capture Rome. He appoints his 21-year-old son, Enzo of Sardinia, as imperial vicar general for Northern Italy. Frederick also threatens with war against Venice, which has sent ships to blockade the harbors on Sicily. In order to finance his growing need for arms, he institutes an administrative reorganization of the Holy Roman Empire (among others, the formation of 10 vice regencies in Italy).
- Autumn – King Béla IV of Hungary allows some 40,000 Cumans, pagan nomads fleeing the Mongols, to settle in Hungary between the rivers Danube and Theiss, after their leader, Köten, has promised to convert to Christianity.
- November – Pope Gregory IX grants the status of Crusade to King Ferdinand III of Castile ("the Saint"), who leads a successful campaign against the Almohads in Murcia.
- King Louis IX of France ("the Saint") holds a parlement (or "court of law") at Paris, for the first time recorded in Ancien Régime France.

====== England ======
- June 17 or June 18 – Edward I of England ("Longshanks"), first son of King Henry III of England and Queen Eleanor of Provence, is born at the Palace of Westminster. Henry names him after Edward the Confessor and chooses Simon de Montfort as his godfather.

====== Levant ======
- September 1 – Barons' Crusade: A Crusader force (some 1,500 knights) under King Theobald I of Navarre arrives at Acre. At a council of local barons – most prominently Walter of Brienne, Odo of Montbéliard, Balian of Beirut, John of Arsuf, and Balian of Sidon – plans are made to prepare an expedition against the Ayyubids in Egypt. Later, Theobald is joined by some Crusaders from Cyprus.
- November 2 – An expeditionary force (some 4,000 knights) under Theobald I sets out from Acre for the Egyptian frontier, detachments from the military orders and several local barons accompany the Crusaders. While marching to Jaffa, a Crusader column led by Peter of Brittany and his lieutenant Raoul de Soissons with two hundred knights, lays an ambush and attacks a rich Muslim caravan.
- November 12 – Sultan as-Salih Ayyub sends an Ayyubid army to Gaza to protect the Egyptian border. At nightfall, Henry of Bar, jealous of the successful ambush of Peter of Brittany, decides to march out towards Gaza with a Crusader force (some 500 knights and 1,000 soldiers). Although warned by Theobald I, Henry sets up camp in a flat terrain surrounded by sand dunes near Gaza.
- November 13 – Battle of Gaza: The Crusader army led by Henry of Bar is defeated by the Egyptians near Gaza. More than a thousand men are slaughtered, including Henry himself. Six hundred more are captured and carried off to Egypt. Among them are Amaury VI de Montfort and Philippe de Nanteuil – who, in the dungeons of Cairo, writes a Crusade song about the failure of the expedition.
- December 7 – Ayyubid forces under An-Nasir Dawud march on Jerusalem, which is largely undefended. The garrison of the city surrenders to Dawud, after accepting his offer for a safe-conduct to Acre. Dawud destroys Jerusalem's fortifications, including the Tower of David. Meanwhile, Theobald I (losing many men underway) moves with the remnants of the Crusader army northward to Acre.

====== Mongol Empire ======
- The Mongol invasion of Kievan Rus': The Mongols under Batu Khan continue their campaign across the Pontic Steppe. After devastating the Crimea and campaigning against the Circassians in the Caucasus, they turn towards the Kievan Rus'. In March, Pereyaslavl, capital of the Principality of Pereyaslavl, is sacked by the Mongols.
- October 18 – Sack of Chernigov: The Mongols led by Batu Khan attack Chernigov; the garrison rallies outside the walls to face the Mongols in a pitched battle. Prince Mstislav III Glebovich comes to help with his troops but they are slaughtered by Mongol catapults. The city is pillaged as are the towns in the surrounding countryside.

==== By topic ====
====== Religion ======
- March 20 – Gregory IX renews the excommunication of Frederick II, Holy Roman Emperor, while he is at his court in Padua. Frederick responds by expelling the Franciscans and Dominicans from Lombardy.

== Births ==
1230

- March – Henry of Castile the Senator, Spanish prince (d. 1303)
- Anna of Hohenstaufen, empress of Nicaea (d. 1307)
- Elisabeth of Brunswick-Lüneburg, German queen consort (d. 1266)
- Gottfried Hagen, German cleric and writer (d. 1299)
- Hermann of Buxhoeveden, Bishop of Ösel-Wiek, German churchman (d. 1285)
- Hugh Aycelin, French cardinal and theologian (d. 1297)
- Hu Sanxing (or Shenzhi), Chinese historian (d. 1302)
- Leonardo Patrasso, Italian cardinal-bishop (d. 1311)
- Masuccio Primo, Italian architect and sculptor (d. 1306)
- Maud de Lacy, Baroness Geneville, Norman-Irish noblewoman (d. 1304)
- Odo, Count of Nevers (or Eudes), French nobleman and knight (d. 1266)
- Squarcino Borri, Italian mercenary leader (d. 1277)
- Yaroslav III of Tver, Kievan Grand Prince (d. 1271)

Approximate date

- Adelaide of Holland, Dutch countess and regent (d. 1284)
- Bentivenga dei Bentivenghi, Italian cardinal (d. 1289)
- Boniface VIII, pope of the Catholic Church (d. 1303)
- Edmund de Lacy, English nobleman and knight (d. 1258)
- Guillaume de Beaujeu, French Grand Master (d. 1291)
- Guillaume Durand, French bishop and writer (d. 1296)
- Jacobus de Voragine, Italian archbishop (d. 1298)
- Margaret Sambiria, Danish queen consort (d. 1282)
- Peter Quinel, English archdeacon and bishop (d. 1291)

1231

- March 17 – Shijō (Mitsuhito), emperor of Japan (d. 1242)
- Guo Shoujing, Chinese astronomer and engineer (d. 1316)
- James Salomoni, Italian Dominican priest and prior (d. 1314)
- John de Warenne, English nobleman and knight (d. 1304)
- John of Burgundy, French nobleman and knight (d. 1268)
- Philip of Castile, Spanish prince and archbishop (d. 1274)
- Roger Mortimer, English nobleman and knight (d. 1282)
- Tommaso degli Stefani, Italian painter and artist (d. 1310)
- Yolanda of Vianden, Luxembourgish prioress (d. 1283)

1232

- March 9 – Chen Wenlong, Chinese scholar-general (d. 1277)
- November 10 – Haakon the Young, king of Norway (d. 1257)
- unknown date – Manfred, king of Sicily (House of Hohenstaufen) (d. 1266)
- probable – Bernard Saisset, French nobleman and bishop (d. 1314)

1233

- June/July – Ibn Manzur, Arab lexicographer and writer (d. 1312)
- August 15 – Philip Benizi de Damiani, Italian religious leader (d. 1285)
- October – Al-Nawawi, Syrian scholar, jurist and writer (d. 1277)
- Adelaide of Burgundy, duchess of Brabant (d. 1273)
- Choe Ui, Korean military leader and dictator (d. 1258)
- Ibn al-Quff, Ayyubid physician and surgeon (d. 1286)
- Sancho of Castile, archbishop of Toledo (d. 1261)

1234

- February 27 – Abaqa Khan, Mongol ruler of the Ilkhanate (d. 1282)
- Christina of Norway, Infanta of Castile, princess (d. 1262)
- Kaliman I, emperor (tsar) of Bulgaria (d. 1246)
- Conrad of Ascoli, Italian friar and missionary (d. 1289)
- Ippen (or Zuien), Japanese Buddhist monk (d. 1289)
- Manuel of Castile, Spanish prince (infante) (d. 1283)
- Margaret of Holland, Dutch noblewoman (d. 1276)
- Ou Shizi, Chinese Confucian scholar (d. 1324)

1235

- November 2 – Henry of Almain, King of the Romans (d. 1271)
- probable
  - Pope Boniface VIII (approximate date; d. 1303)
  - Ramon Llull, Catalan writer and philosopher (d. 1315)
  - Arnold of Villanova, Spanish alchemist and physician (d. 1311)
  - Qian Xuan, Chinese painter (d. 1305)

1236

- January 1 – Baldwin de Redvers, English nobleman (d. 1262)
- June 6 – Wen Tianxiang, Chinese poet and politician (d. 1283)
- June 8 – Violant of Aragon, queen consort of Castile (d. 1301)
- October – Qutb al-Din al-Shirazi, Persian polymath and poet (d. 1311)
- after October – Alice de Lusignan (or Angoulême), French-born English countess (d. 1290)
- November 8 – Lu Xiufu, Chinese general and politician (d. 1279)
- Albert I, Duke of Brunswick-Lüneburg ("the Great"), German nobleman and regent (d. 1279)
- Bayan of the Baarin (or Boyan), Mongol general (d. 1295)
- Elizabeth of Hungary, duchess consort of Bavaria (d. 1271)
- Henry II of Rodez, French nobleman and troubadour (d. 1304)
- Olivier II de Clisson, Breton nobleman and knight (d. 1307)
- Stephen the Posthumous, Hungarian pretender (d. 1271)

1237

- July 7 – Ibn Abd al-Malik, Almohad historian (d. 1303)
- Agnes of Dampierre, French noblewoman (d. 1288)
- Bohemond VI (the Fair), prince of Antioch (d. 1275)
- Isabel de Redvers, English noblewoman (d. 1293)
- John II, margrave of Brandenburg-Stendal (d. 1281)
- Ladislaus of Salzburg, German archbishop (d. 1270)
- Munio of Zamora, Spanish friar and bishop (d. 1300)

1238

- March 12 – Serafina, Italian noblewoman and saint (d. 1253)
- April 23 – Narathihapate (or Sithu IV), Burmese ruler (d. 1287)
- May 1 – Magnus VI (the Law-mender), king of Norway (d. 1280)
- May 3 – Emilia Bicchieri, Italian nun and prioress (d. 1314)
- July 11 – Dafydd ap Gruffydd, prince of Wales (d. 1283)
- Al-Bahrani, Arab Shia scholar and philosopher (d. 1280)
- Guglielmo Agnelli, Italian sculptor and architect (d. 1313)
- Henry de Montfort, English nobleman and knight (d. 1265)
- Hōjō Nobutoki, Japanese nobleman and regent (d. 1323)
- Madhva Acharya, Indian Hindu religious leader (d. 1317)
- Maurice FitzGerald, Irish nobleman and justiciar (d. 1277)
- Meinhard II, duke of Carinthia (House of Gorizia) (d. 1295)
- Nicholas Segrave, English nobleman and knight (d. 1295)
- Nizamuddin Auliya (or Awliya), Indian Sufi scholar (d. 1325)
- Otto de Grandson, Savoyard nobleman and knight (d. 1328)
- Pedro Armengol, Spanish nobleman and priest (d. 1304)
- Rinchen Gyaltsen, Tibetan imperial preceptor (d. 1279)
- Yang Hui, Chinese mathematician and writer (d. 1298)
- Yao Sui, Chinese politician, poet and writer (d. 1313)
- Yunus Emre, Seljuk poet, mystic and writer (d. 1328)
- Zhang Hongfan, Chinese general and admiral (d. 1280)

1239

- June 3 or June 4 – John II, Duke of Brittany, French nobleman and knight (d. 1305)
- June 17 or June 18 – Edward I ("Longshanks"), king of England (d. 1307)
- December 17 – Kujō Yoritsugu, Japanese ruler (shogun) (d. 1256)
- Álvaro, Count of Urgell ("the Castilian"), Spanish nobleman and knight (d. 1268)
- Balian of Arsuf, Cypriot nobleman (House of Ibelin) (d. 1277)
- Constance of Aragon, Spanish princess (infanta) (d. 1269)
- Peter III, king of Aragon and Valencia (d. 1285)
- Robert de Ferrers, English nobleman and knight (d. 1279)
- Stephen V, king of Hungary (House of Árpád) (d. 1272)
- Thomas I of Saluzzo, Italian nobleman and knight (d. 1296)

== Deaths ==
1230

- January 30 – Pelagio Galvani, Leonese cardinal (b. 1165)
- February 1 – Matsudono Motofusa, Japanese nobleman
- May 2 – William de Braose, English nobleman and knight
- May 13 – Casimir I of Opole, Polish nobleman and knight
- July 12 – Margaret, Countess of Blois, French noblewoman (b. 1170)
- July 19 –Theobald le Botiller, 2nd Chief Butler of Ireland, Norman nobleman (b. 1200)
- July 25 – Rudolph van Coevorden, Dutch nobleman (b. 1192)
- July 28 – Leopold VI, Duke of Austria, German nobleman and knight (b. 1176)
- July 29 – Hōjō Tokiuji, Japanese nobleman and spy (b. 1203)
- August 24 – Geoffrey de Saye, English nobleman (b. 1155)
- September 9 – Siegfried II, archbishop of Mainz (b. 1165)
- September 24 – Alfonso IX, king of León and Galicia (b. 1171)
- October 25 – Gilbert de Clare, 5th Earl of Gloucester, English nobleman (b. 1180)
- November 20 – Nicola de la Haye, English noblewoman
- November 24 – Matthew II of Montmorency, French nobleman and knight
- December 15 – Ottokar I of Bohemia, German nobleman
- December 23 – Berengaria of Navarre, queen consort of England
- Al-Dakhwar, Ayyubid physician and medical officer (b. 1170)
- Alfonso Téllez de Meneses el Viejo, Spanish nobleman (b. c.1161)
- Beatrice of Viennois, French noblewoman (b. 1160)
- Demetrius of Montferrat, king of Thessalonica (b. 1205)
- Hugues IV de Châteauneuf, French nobleman (b. 1185)
- Ibn Hammad, Hammadid historian and writer (b. 1153)
- Robert de Gresle, English landowner and knight (b. 1174)

Approximate date

- Samuel ibn Tibbon, French rabbi, doctor and philosopher
- Urraca López de Haro, queen consort of León

1231

- April 6 – William Marshal, English nobleman (b. 1190)
- May 7 – Beatrice II, French countess palatine (b. 1193)
- June 13 – Anthony of Padua, Portuguese priest (b. 1195)
- July 2 – Henry I, German nobleman (House of Zähringen)
- August 3 – Richard le Grant, archbishop of Canterbury
- August 28 – Eleanor of Portugal, queen consort of Denmark
- September – Ibn Muti al-Zawawi, Almohad jurist, philologian and writer
- September 3 – William II, French nobleman (b. 1196)
- September 15 – Louis I, German nobleman (b. 1173)
- November 3 – Władysław III, Polish nobleman (b. 1167)
- November 6 – Tsuchimikado, emperor of Japan (b. 1196)
- November 9 – Abd al-Latif al-Baghdadi, Abbasid physician (b. 1162)
- November 17 – Elizabeth, Hungarian princess (b. 1207)
- November 28 – Valdemar the Young, king of Denmark
- December 7 – Richardis, German noblewoman (b. 1173)
- December 11 – Ida of Nivelles, Flemish nun and mystic
- December 25 – Folquet de Marselha, French bishop
- Abu Said al-Baji, Almohad leader and scholar (b. 1156)
- Aurembiaix, Spanish countess (House of Urgell) (b. 1196)
- Dúinnín Ó Maolconaire, Irish historian, poet and writer
- Elisabeth of Brandenburg, Landgravine of Thuringia, German noblewoman (b. 1206)
- Gonzalo Rodríguez Girón, Spanish nobleman (b. 1160)
- Ibn al-Qattan, Almohad imam, scholar and intellectual
- Jalal al-Din Mangburni, ruler of the Khwarazmian Empire
- Matthew FitzHerbert, English nobleman and high sheriff
- Meinhard II, Count of Gorizia ("the Elder"), German nobleman and knight
- William of Auxerre, French archdeacon and theologian
- Zhao Rukuo, Chinese historian and politician (b. 1170)

1232

- January 28 – Peire de Montagut, French Grand Master
- February 21 – Myōe, Japanese Buddhist monk (b. 1173)
- April 10 – Rudolf II, Count of Habsburg ("the Kind"), German nobleman
- June 7 – Wawrzyniec (bishop of Wrocław) (or Lawrence), Polish bishop
- July 18 – John de Braose, English nobleman and knight
- August 24 – Ralph of Bristol, English cleric and bishop
- October 11 – Gebhard I of Plain, German bishop (b. 1170)
- October 15 – Albert I of Käfernburg, German archbishop
- October 17 – Idris al-Ma'mun, ruler of the Almohad Caliphate
- October 26 – Ranulf de Blondeville, 6th Earl of Chester, English nobleman (b. 1170)
- December 31 – Patrick I, Earl of Dunbar, Scottish nobleman and knight (b. 1152)
- Marianus II of Torres, Sardinian Judge of Logudoro

1233

- January 6 – Matilda of Chester, Countess of Huntingdon (or Maud), English noblewoman (b. 1171)
- January 18 – Yang (or Gongsheng), Chinese empress (b. 1162)
- February 12 – Ermengarde de Beaumont, queen of Scotland
- March 1 – Thomas I (or Tommaso), count of Savoy (b. 1178)
- May – Simon of Joinville, French nobleman and knight (b. 1175)
- June – Yolanda de Courtenay, queen consort of Hungary
- July 8 – Konoe Motomichi, Japanese nobleman (b. 1160)
- July 26 – Wilbrand of Oldenburg, prince-bishop of Utrecht
- July 27 – Ferdinand (or Ferrand), count of Flanders (b. 1188)
- July 29 – Savari de Mauléon, French nobleman (b. 1181)
- July 30 – Konrad von Marburg, German priest (b. 1180)
- October 8 – Ugo Canefri, Italian health worker (b. 1148)
- October 22 – Fujiwara no Shunshi, Japanese empress consort (b. 1209)
- November 22 – Helena, duchess of Brunswick-Lüneburg
- November 27 – Shi Miyuan, Chinese politician (b. 1164)
- Ibn al-Athir, Seljuk historian and biographer (b. 1160)
- Bertran de Born lo Filhs, French troubadour (b. 1179)
- Bohemond IV ("the One-Eyed"), prince of Antioch (b. 1175)
- Gökböri ("Blue-Wolf"), Ayyubid general and ruler (b. 1154)
- Guillén Pérez de Guzmán, Spanish nobleman (b. 1180)
- John Apokaukos, Byzantine bishop and theologian
- Mathilde of Angoulême, French noblewoman (b. 1181)
- Sayf al-Din al-Amidi, Ayyubid scholar and jurist (b. 1156)
- William Comyn, Scoto-Norman nobleman (b. 1163)

1234

- January 7 – Robert of Auvergne, bishop of Clermont
- February 9
  - Aizong of Jin, Chinese emperor (b. 1198)
  - Mo of Jin (or Hudun), Chinese emperor
- April 7 – Sancho VII ("the Strong"), king of Navarre
- April 16 – Richard Marshal, 3rd Earl of Pembroke, English nobleman (b. 1191)
- May 7 – Otto I, Duke of Merania, German nobleman and knight (b. 1180)
- June 18 – Chūkyō, emperor (tennō) of Japan (b. 1218)
- July 19 – Floris IV, Count of Holland, Dutch nobleman and knight (b. 1210)
- July 29 – William Pinchon, French prelate and bishop
- August 7 – Hugh Foliot, bishop of Hereford (b. 1155)
- August 31 – Go-Horikawa, emperor of Japan (b. 1212)
- September 6 – Milo of Nanteuil, bishop of Beauvais
- September 26 – Eudes II, Lord of Ham, French nobleman
- November 8 – Baha ad-Din ibn Shaddad, Arab historian (b. 1145)
- Abu Muhammad Salih al-Majiri, Almohad Sufi leader (b. 1155)
- Alan of Galloway, Scottish nobleman
- Canute II ("the Tall"), king of Sweden (House of Folkung)
- Dalfi d'Alvernha, Count of Clermont and Montferrand, French nobleman, troubador and patron of the arts (b. c. 1150)
- Helen of Galloway, Scottish noblewoman and heiress
- Hugh de Neville, English Chief Forester and sheriff
- Ibn al-Farid, Arab poet, writer and philosopher (b. 1181)
- Minamoto no Ienaga, Japanese waka poet (b. 1170)
- Nasir ad-Din Mahmud II, Zengid ruler
- Pacificus, Italian-born friar and poet
- Renard II of Dampierre-en-Astenois (or Renaud), French nobleman and knight
- Rhys Gryg (Rhys ap Rhys), Welsh prince of Deheubarth
- Robert III, Count of Dreux ("Gasteblé"), French nobleman (b. 1185)
- Shihab al-Din 'Umar al-Suhrawardi, Persian Sufi scholar (b. 1145)
- William of Andres, French abbot and historian
- Zhang Yuansu, Chinese physician and writer

1235

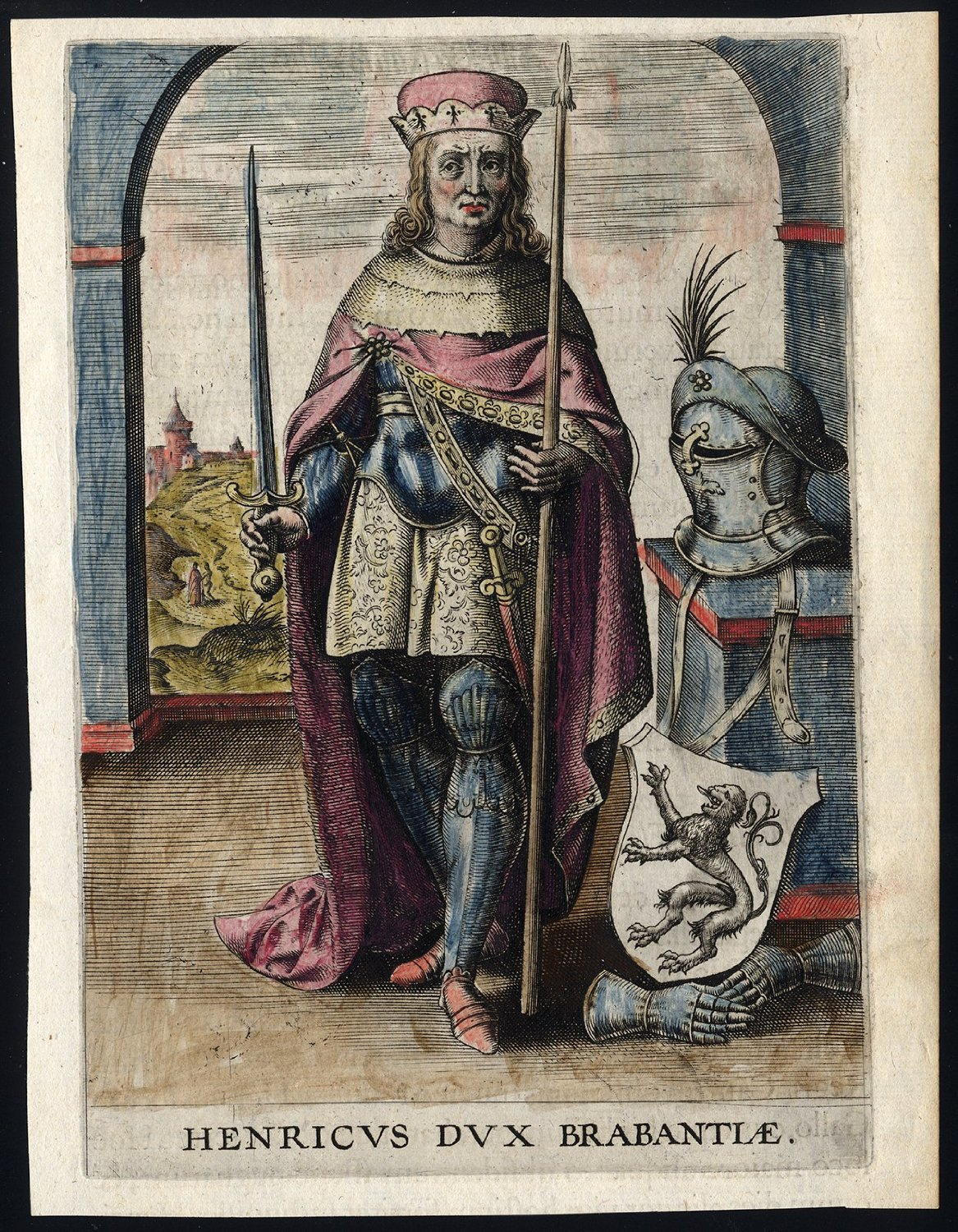
Henry I, Duke of Brabant

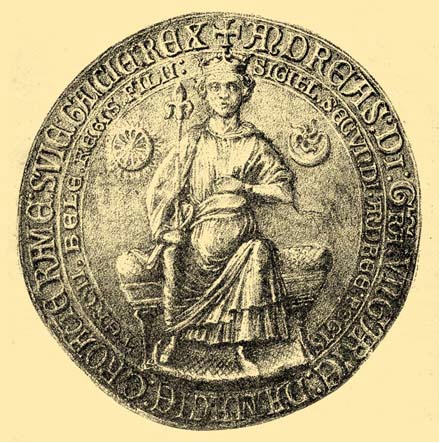
King Andrew II of Hungary

- September 5 – Henry I, Duke of Brabant (b. 1165)
- September 21 – King Andrew II of Hungary (b. 1175)
- November 5 – Elisabeth of Swabia, queen consort of Castile and León (b. 1205)
- date unknown
  - Andronikos I Gidos, Emperor of Trebizond
  - Ibn al-Qabisi, Iraqi linguist (b. 1163)
  - Rabbi David Kimhi, French Biblical commentator (b. 1160)

1236

- January 14 – Sava ("the Enlightener"), Serbian archbishop
- March 15 – Mu'in al-Din Chishti, Persian preacher (b. 1143)
- March 28 – Conon of Naso, Italian priest and abbot (b. 1139)
- April 11 – Walter II de Beauchamp, English sheriff (b. 1192)
- May 1 – William d'Aubigny (or d'Albini), English nobleman
- May 6 – Roger of Wendover, English monk and chronicler
- May 7 – Agnellus of Pisa, Italian Franciscan friar (b. 1195)
- June 10 – Diana degli Andalò, Italian nun and saint (b. 1201)
- July 18 – Valdemar of Denmark, Danish bishop and statesman (b. 1158)
- July 29 – Ingeborg of Denmark, queen consort of France (b. 1174)
- August 16 – Thomas Blunville, English priest and bishop
- August 17 – William de Blois, English bishop and sheriff
- September 12 – Thomas of Marlborough, English abbot
- September 22 – Volkwin von Naumburg, German knight
- November 15 – Lope Díaz II, Castilian nobleman (b. 1170)
- November 26 – Al-Aziz Muhammad, Ayyubid ruler (b. 1213)
- Barisone III of Torres, Sardinian judge of Logudoro (b. 1221)
- Dirk I van Brederode, Dutch nobleman and knight (b. 1180)
- Fakhr-i Mudabbir, Ghaznavid historian and writer (b. 1157)
- Gautier de Coincy, French abbot and troubadour (b. 1177)
- John of Ibelin, constable and regent of Jerusalem (b. 1179)
- Philip d'Aubigny, French nobleman and chancellor (b. 1166)
- Saifuddin Aibak, Mamluk Sultanate governor and politician

1237

- February 2 – Joan, Lady of Wales, English princess
- March 14 – Guigues VI of Viennois, count of Albon (b. 1184)
- March 16 – Guðmundur Arason, Icelandic bishop (b. 1161)
- March 27 – John of Brienne (John I), king of Jerusalem
- April 12
  - Berengaria of León, Latin empress consort (b. 1204)
  - Philip II de Méréville, French priest and bishop
- April 15 – Richard Poore, English prelate and bishop
- May 5 – Fujiwara no Ietaka, Japanese waka poet (b. 1158)
- May 31 – Kayqubad I, Seljuk ruler of the Sultanate of Rum
- June 6 – John of Scotland, Scottish nobleman (b. 1207)
- July 29 – Ingeborg of Denmark, queen of France (b. 1174)
- August 27 – Al-Ashraf Musa, Ayyubid ruler of Damascus
- August 31 – Huijong, Korean ruler of Goryeo (b. 1181)
- December 21 – Yuri Igorevich, Grand Prince of Ryazan
- Anna Maria, empress of the Bulgarian Empire (b. 1204)
- Emo of Friesland, Dutch scholar, abbot and writer (b. 1175)
- John Halgren of Abbeville, French philosopher and writer
- Jordan of Saxony, German preacher and religious leader
- Julius I Kán ("the Elder"), Hungarian nobleman and landowner
- Kamal al-Din Isfahani, Persian poet and writer (b. 1172)
- Shunten (or Shunten-Ō), ruler of Okinawa Island (b. 1166)
- Wei Liaoweng, Chinese politician and philosopher (b. 1178)

1238

- March 4
  - Joan of England, queen consort of Scotland (b. 1210)
  - Vasilko Konstantinovich, Kievan prince (b. 1209)
  - Yuri II of Vladimir, Kievan Grand Prince (b. 1188)
- March 6 – Al-Kamil, Ayyubid ruler of Egypt (b. 1177)
- March 16 – Benchō, Japanese Buddhist monk (b. 1162)
- March 19 – Henry I (the Bearded), duke of Poland
- March 21 – Awhad al-Din Kermani, Persian Sufi poet
- June 9 – Peter des Roches, bishop of Winchester
- July 9 – William de Malveisin, bishop of St. Andrews
- July 10 – Sophia of Wittelsbach, German noblewoman
- September 28 – Jeanne des Roches, French baroness
- December 26 – Alexander de Stavenby, English bishop
- Abu abd Allah Muhammad (or Ibn Hud), Almohad ruler
- Azriel of Gerona, Catalan rabbi and scholar (b. 1160)
- Evpaty Kolovrat, Kievan warrior and knight (b. 1200)
- Heinrich I von Müllenark, German archbishop (b. 1190)
- Hugh le Despenser, English nobleman and high sheriff
- Hugh of Ibelin (the Strong), Cypriot knight (b. 1213)
- John I (Axouchos Komnenos), Byzantine emperor
- John of Béthune, French military leader and knight
- Matsudono Moroie, Japanese nobleman (b. 1172)

1239

- February 3 – Kujō Ninshi, Japanese empress consort (b. 1173)
- February – Aimery III of Narbonne (or Aimeric), French nobleman
- March 3 – Vladimir IV Rurikovich, Kievan Grand Prince (b. 1187)
- March 20 – Hermann von Salza, German Grand Master (b. 1165)
- March 28 – Go-Toba (Toba II), emperor of Japan (b. 1180)
- April 7 – William I de Cantilupe, Norman nobleman (b. 1159)
- June 5 – Władysław Odonic ("the Spitter"), Polish nobleman
- August – Thomas of Capua, Italian prelate, cardinal and diplomat
- September 21 – Simon, Count of Ponthieu, French nobleman
- November 1 – Robert of Esztergom, Hungarian prelate
- November 13 – Henry II, Count of Bar, French nobleman (b. 1190)
- December 13 – Albert IV, Count of Habsburg ("the Wise"), German nobleman
- December 21
  - Henry de Turberville, English nobleman and knight
  - Richard Wilton, English scholastic philosopher
- Abu al-Abbas al-Nabati, Andalusian pharmacist (b. 1166)
- Ibn al-Khabbaza, Moroccan historian, poet and writer
- Ibn al-Mustawfi, Ayyubid governor and historian (b. 1169)
- Muhammad bin Hasan al-Baghdadi, Arab cuisine writer
- Robert, Lord of Champignelles (de Courtenay), French nobleman, knight and Crusader (b. 1168)
