= 1234 =

1234 in various calendars
- Gregorian calendar: 1234; MCCXXXIV
- Ab urbe condita: 1987
- Armenian calendar: 683; ԹՎ ՈՁԳ
- Assyrian calendar: 5984
- Balinese saka calendar: 1155–1156
- Bengali calendar: 640–641
- Berber calendar: 2184
- English Regnal year: 18 Hen. 3 – 19 Hen. 3
- Buddhist calendar: 1778
- Burmese calendar: 596
- Byzantine calendar: 6742–6743
- Chinese calendar: 癸巳年 (Water Snake); 3931 or 3724 — to — 甲午年 (Wood Horse); 3932 or 3725
- Coptic calendar: 950–951
- Discordian calendar: 2400
- Ethiopian calendar: 1226–1227
- Hebrew calendar: 4994–4995
- Hindu calendars
- Vikram Samvat: 1290–1291
- Shaka Samvat: 1155–1156
- Kali Yuga: 4334–4335
- Holocene calendar: 11234
- Igbo calendar: 234–235
- Iranian calendar: 612–613
- Islamic calendar: 631–632
- Japanese calendar: Tenpuku 2 / Bunryaku 1 (文暦元年)
- Javanese calendar: 1143–1144
- Julian calendar: 1234; MCCXXXIV
- Korean calendar: 3567
- Minguo calendar: 678 before ROC 民前678年
- Nanakshahi calendar: −234
- Thai solar calendar: 1776–1777
- Tibetan calendar: ཆུ་མོ་སྦྲུལ་ལོ་ (female Water-Snake); 1360 or 979 or 207 — to — ཤིང་ཕོ་རྟ་ལོ་ (male Wood-Horse); 1361 or 980 or 208

Year 1234 (MCCXXXIV) was a common year starting on Sunday (full calendar displayed in the link) of the Julian calendar.

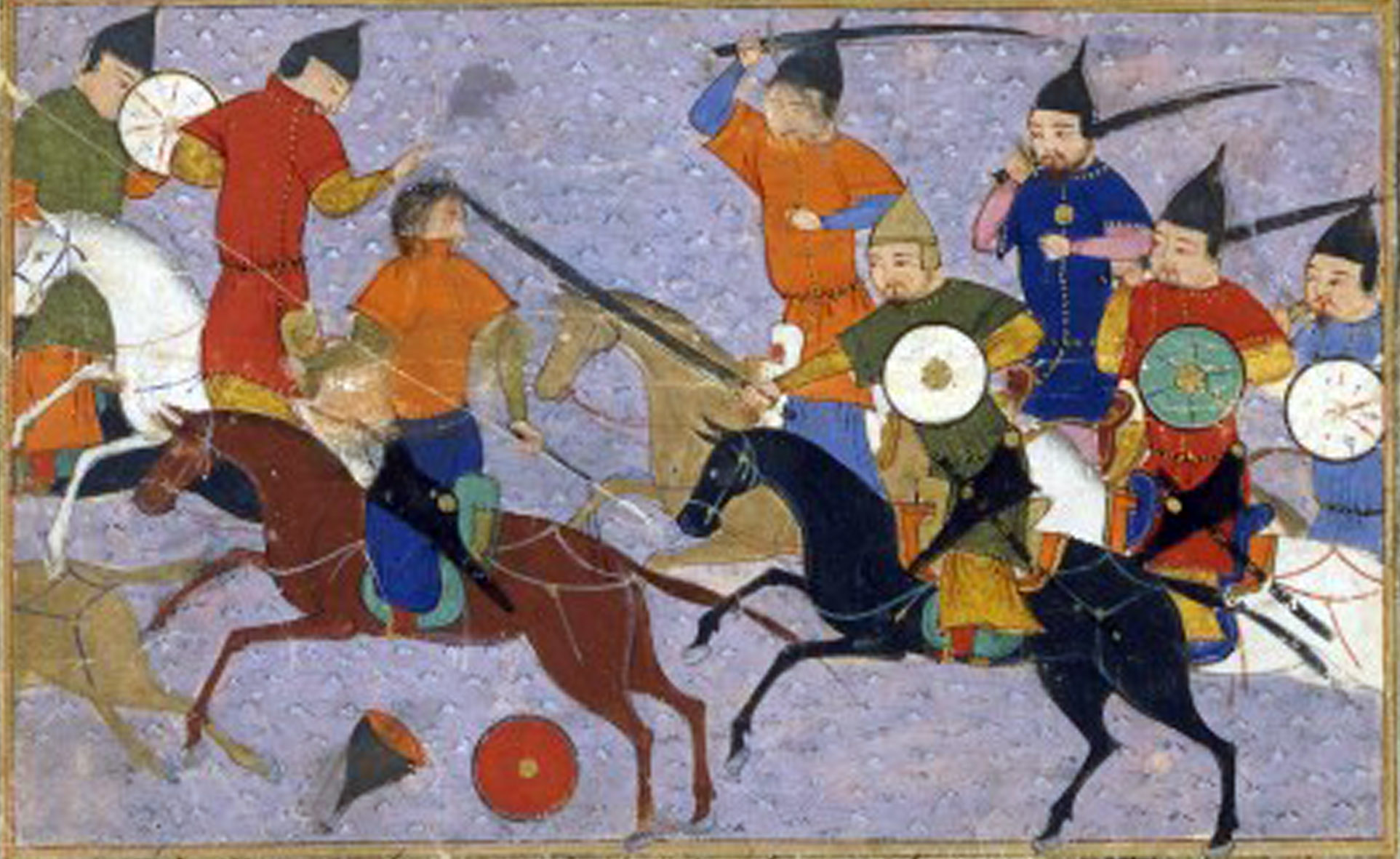
Battle between Mongol warriors and Jin horsemen, during the Mongol conquest of the Jin dynasty from the Jami' al-tawarikh, by Rashid al-Din Hamadani

== Events ==
=== By place ===
==== Europe ====
- King Canute II of Sweden ("the Tall") dies after a five-year reign, perhaps of natural causes. His rival, Eric XI ("the Lisp and Lame"), returns as ruler of Sweden (possibly after a civil war between the two of them).
- King Andrew II of Hungary proclaims his son, Coloman of Galicia, as ruler (or ban) of Bosnia, who passes it on to Prijezda, a cousin of Matej Ninoslav, despite Matej being the legitimate ruler.
- Reconquista – King Sancho II of Portugal conquers the cities of Aljustrel and Mértola from the Moors.

==== Mongol Empire ====
- February 9 – Mongol conquest of the Jin dynasty: The Mongol army led by Ögedei Khan captures the Jin capital at Caizhou, after the two-month Siege of Caizhou). Emperor Aizong of Jin abdicates the throne to Wanyan Chenglin, a descendant of the Jin imperial clan. After the Mongol and Song forces have breached the city walls, Aizong tries to escape, but commits suicide to avoid being captured. This marks the end of the Jin dynasty (1115–1234) ('Great Jin') in China.

==== Africa ====
- The Manden region rises against the Kaniaga Kingdom. This is the beginning of a process that will lead to the rise of the Mali Empire.

=== By topic ===
==== Religion ====
- July 3 – Saint Dominic is canonized by Pope Gregory IX.
- November – Pope Gregory IX proclaims war on the city of Rome after a local revolt forces him into exile. He issues the papal bull Rachel suum videns, calling for a new crusade to the Holy Land.
- Lund Cathedral in Sweden is heavily damaged in a catastrophic fire. Large donations are made to the church, to rebuild the cathedral.

== Births ==
- February 27 – Abaqa Khan, Mongol ruler of the Ilkhanate (d. 1282)
- Christina of Norway, Infanta of Castile, princess (d. 1262)
- Kaliman I, emperor (tsar) of Bulgaria (d. 1246)
- Conrad of Ascoli, Italian friar and missionary (d. 1289)
- Ippen (or Zuien), Japanese Buddhist monk (d. 1289)
- Manuel of Castile, Spanish prince (infante) (d. 1283)
- Margaret of Holland, Dutch noblewoman (d. 1276)
- Ou Shizi, Chinese Confucian scholar (d. 1324)

== Deaths ==
- January 7 – Robert of Auvergne, bishop of Clermont
- February 9
  - Aizong of Jin, Chinese emperor (b. 1198)
  - Mo of Jin (or Hudun), Chinese emperor
- April 7 – Sancho VII ("the Strong"), king of Navarre
- April 16 – Richard Marshal, 3rd Earl of Pembroke, English nobleman (b. 1191)
- May 7 – Otto I, Duke of Merania, German nobleman and knight (b. 1180)
- June 18 – Chūkyō, emperor (tennō) of Japan (b. 1218)
- July 19 – Floris IV, Count of Holland, Dutch nobleman and knight (b. 1210)
- July 29 – William Pinchon, French prelate and bishop
- August 7 – Hugh Foliot, bishop of Hereford (b. 1155)
- August 31 – Go-Horikawa, emperor of Japan (b. 1212)
- September 6 – Milo of Nanteuil, bishop of Beauvais
- September 26 – Eudes II, Lord of Ham, French nobleman
- November 8 – Baha ad-Din ibn Shaddad, Arab historian (b. 1145)
- Abu Muhammad Salih al-Majiri, Almohad Sufi leader (b. 1155)
- Alan of Galloway, Scottish nobleman
- Canute II ("the Tall"), king of Sweden (House of Folkung)
- Dalfi d'Alvernha, Count of Clermont and Montferrand, French nobleman, troubador and patron of the arts (b. c. 1150)
- Helen of Galloway, Scottish noblewoman and heiress
- Hugh de Neville, English Chief Forester and sheriff
- Ibn al-Farid, Arab poet, writer and philosopher (b. 1181)
- Minamoto no Ienaga, Japanese waka poet (b. 1170)
- Nasir ad-Din Mahmud II, Zengid ruler
- Pacificus, Italian-born friar and poet
- Renard II of Dampierre-en-Astenois (or Renaud), French nobleman and knight
- Rhys Gryg (Rhys ap Rhys), Welsh prince of Deheubarth
- Robert III, Count of Dreux ("Gasteblé"), French nobleman (b. 1185)
- Shihab al-Din 'Umar al-Suhrawardi, Persian Sufi scholar (b. 1145)
- William of Andres, French abbot and historian
- Zhang Yuansu, Chinese physician and writer
