= Wang Haogu =

Yuan-dynasty Chinese physician

Wang Haogu (Chinese: 王好古; pinyin: Wáng Hǎogǔ; 1200–1264), courtesy name Haizang (Chinese: 海藏; pinyin: Hǎizàng), was a Chinese physician and writer. He authored a treatise on insanity and its remedies, in addition to a materia medica that uniquely categorised drugs according to the theory of the wuxing (Five Phases).

== Career ==
After becoming a jinshi (graduate of the highest imperial examinations), Wang studied medicine with Li Dongyuan. (Note: Wang is also believed to have been taught by Zhang Yuansu, although this is disputed by Fabian Simonis, who found "no conclusive support for this claim".) Wang was a native of Zhaozhou, Hebei, while Li resided in the nearby county of Zhending. Wang was particularly influenced by Li's philosophy of "flexible" medication. His Yinzheng lüeli (陰證略例) (Note: Translated into English as Elementary Examples of Yin Symptoms.) builds on Li's writings and provides, for the first time, a "replenshing therapy for a mad patient". In the book, which comprises twelve volumes and recounts some of his experiences as an army physician, Wang distinguishes between yang madness and yin madness. He notes in the appendix that he borrowed an "anti-fire" remedy from the Shanghan lun or Treatise on Cold Injury to treat a woman who was suffering from yang madness. However, he criticises the Shanghan lun for glossing over yin madness, and recommends his own remedy for it, which involves aconite and ginger. Wang's formulas became the standard cures for insanity in 15th-century China.

Wang rejected the standard pharmacological practices that had emerged during the Tang and Song dynasties. His three-volume materia medica, titled Tangye bencao (湯液本草) (Note: Or Materia Medica for Decoctions.) and compiled around 1246, was a unique attempt at categorising drugs according to the theory of wuxing (Five Phases), instead of in terms of animals, minerals, and plants.

Wang is credited with being the first to observe that purging croton (Croton tiglium) seeds or ba dou (巴豆), which were already widely known to be a laxative, also had anti-diarrhea properties. Later in the Ming dynasty, physician Li Shizhen was able to successfully treat diarrhea with croton seeds too, after reading Wang's writings.
