= 1170 =

1170 in various calendars
- Gregorian calendar: 1170; MCLXX
- Ab urbe condita: 1923
- Armenian calendar: 619; ԹՎ ՈԺԹ
- Assyrian calendar: 5920
- Balinese saka calendar: 1091–1092
- Bengali calendar: 576–577
- Berber calendar: 2120
- English Regnal year: 16 Hen. 2 – 17 Hen. 2
- Buddhist calendar: 1714
- Burmese calendar: 532
- Byzantine calendar: 6678–6679
- Chinese calendar: 己丑年 (Earth Ox); 3867 or 3660 — to — 庚寅年 (Metal Tiger); 3868 or 3661
- Coptic calendar: 886–887
- Discordian calendar: 2336
- Ethiopian calendar: 1162–1163
- Hebrew calendar: 4930–4931
- Hindu calendars
- Vikram Samvat: 1226–1227
- Shaka Samvat: 1091–1092
- Kali Yuga: 4270–4271
- Holocene calendar: 11170
- Igbo calendar: 170–171
- Iranian calendar: 548–549
- Islamic calendar: 565–566
- Japanese calendar: Kaō 2 (嘉応２年)
- Javanese calendar: 1077–1078
- Julian calendar: 1170; MCLXX
- Korean calendar: 3503
- Minguo calendar: 742 before ROC 民前742年
- Nanakshahi calendar: −298
- Seleucid era: 1481/1482 AG
- Thai solar calendar: 1712–1713
- Tibetan calendar: ས་མོ་གླང་ལོ་ (female Earth-Ox); 1296 or 915 or 143 — to — ལྕགས་ཕོ་སྟག་ལོ་ (male Iron-Tiger); 1297 or 916 or 144

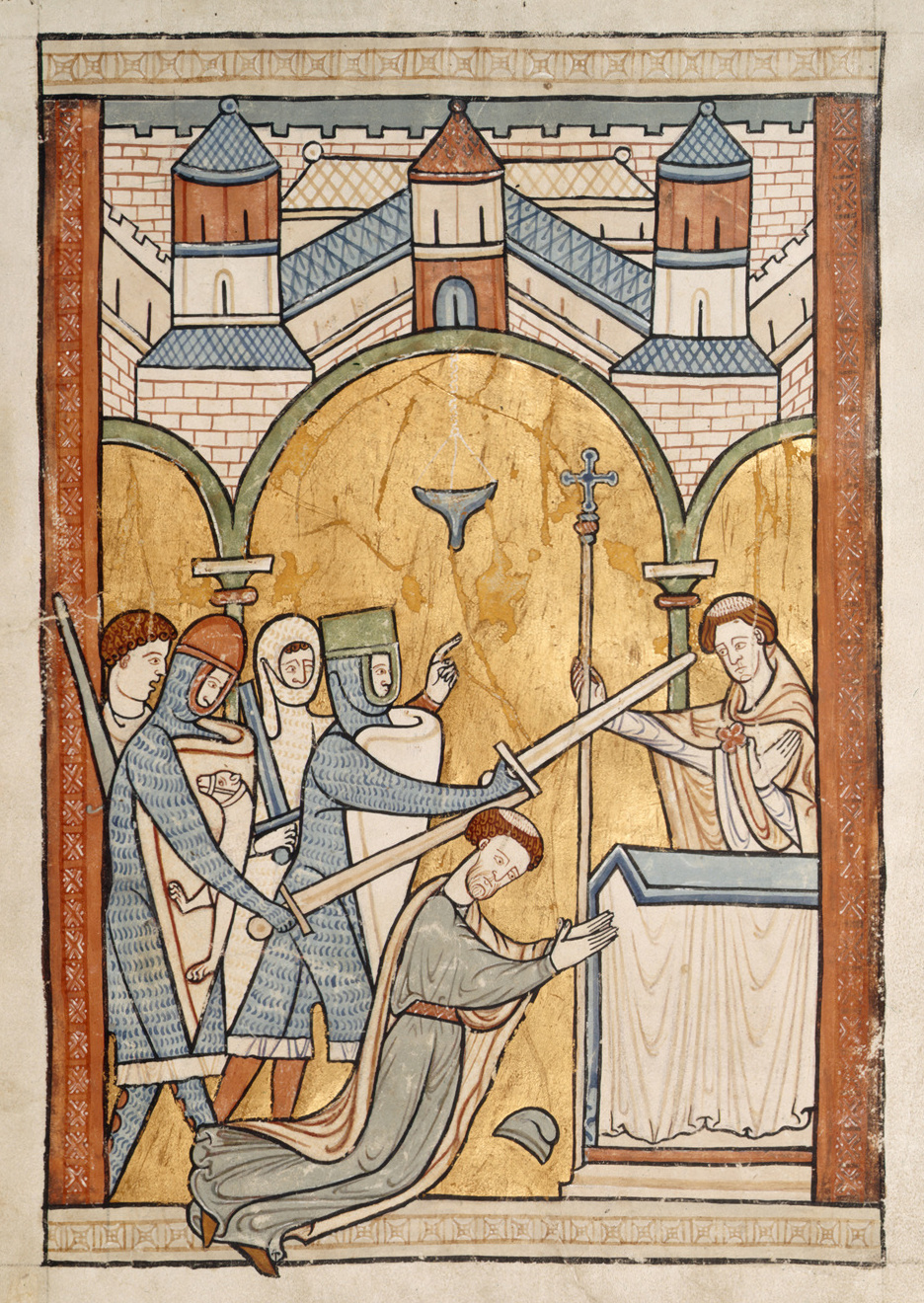
Murder of Thomas Becket (c. 1200)

Year 1170 (MCLXX) was a common year starting on Thursday of the Julian calendar.

== Events ==
=== By place ===
==== Levant ====
- Winter – Egyptian forces, led by Saladin, invade the Kingdom of Jerusalem, and besiege Darum on the Mediterranean coast. Its defenses are weak, and though Saladin has no siege engines with him, the fall seems imminent. King Amalric I withdraws his Templar garrison from Gaza, to assist him in defending Darum. Saladin raises the siege and marches on Gaza, where he captures the lower town (despite the stiff resistance ordered by Lord Miles of Plancy), and massacres the inhabitants. However, the citadel is too strong for Saladin, and he is forced to retreat to Egypt.
- Saladin sends an Egyptian squadron up the Gulf of Aqaba, which captures the Crusader outpost of Aila, at the head of the Gulf.

==== England ====
- June 14 – King Henry II has his 15-year-old son, Henry the Young King, crowned by Roger, Archbishop of York, as junior king and heir to the English throne. The coronation drives Pope Alexander III to allow the exiled Thomas Becket (whose privilege as Archbishop of Canterbury to crown English monarchs has been infringed) to lay an interdict on England as punishment, and this threat forces Henry to negotiate with Becket. Sir William Marshal is appointed tutor-in-arms to Henry the Young King.
- July 22 – Henry II and Thomas Becket meet near Fréteval, France, where they come to an agreement to end their differences. This results in Becket's partial restoration.
- November – Becket controversy: Thomas Becket excommunicates three bishops.
- December 1 – Becket controversy: Henry II sends word that his conflict with Thomas Becket is at an end, and his lands will be restored. Becket returns to England, landing at Sandwich.
- December 29 – Thomas Becket is assassinated by four knights (who believe themselves to be carrying out Henry II's wishes) in Canterbury Cathedral, after his refusal to be arrested for breaking his agreement with Henry II.
- This is the earliest date for the making of cheddar cheese in Somerset (this is according to a pipe roll of Henry II, who purchases 10,240 lb of cheddar at a farthing per pound).

==== Ireland ====
- September 21 – Anglo-Norman invasion of Ireland: Following a siege, combined Anglo-Norman and Irish forces seize the city of Dublin, forcing Ascall mac Ragnaill, last King of Dublin, into exile.

==== Africa ====
- Fes in the Almohad Caliphate (modern Morocco) becomes the largest city of the world, taking the lead from Constantinople, capital of the Byzantine Empire.

==== Asia ====
- June 29 – 1170 Syria earthquake: One of the largest earthquakes to hit Syria. It forms part of a sequence of large earthquakes that propagate southwards along the Dead Sea Transform, starting with the 1138 Aleppo earthquake and continuing with the 1157 Hama, 1170 and 1202 Syria events.
- The palace guards massacre the civil officials at the Korean court of Goryeo and place Myeongjong as new ruler on the throne of the Goryeo dynasty.

=== By topic ===
==== Folklore ====
- The Welsh prince Madoc (son of King Owain ap Gruffudd of Gwynedd) sails to North America, in his ship the Gwennan Gorn, and founds a colony.

==== Religion ====
- Peter Waldo, a French merchant of Lyon, starts the popular religious movement of the "Poor Men of Lyon", or Waldenses.
- Pope Alexander III addresses a series of letters to the backward Swedish church. He wants to impose the strict canonical requirements on the Swedes, that is, the ecclesiastical legal system. Due to being Christianized in 1050, Sweden is having trouble to fully adapt to the Catholicism that is preached and acted on in Europe.

== Births ==
- April 5 – Isabella of Hainault, queen of France (d. 1190)
- May 9 – Valdemar II (the Conqueror), king of Denmark (d. 1241)
- August 8 – Dominic, founder of the Dominican Order (d. 1221)
- October 8 – Vladimir III Igorevich, Kievan prince (d. 1211)
- Agnes I, countess of Nevers, Auxerre and Tonnerre (d. 1192)
- Al-Dakhwar, Ayyubid physician and medical officer (d. 1230)
- Amaury I, French nobleman (House of Craon) (d. 1226)
- Asukai Masatsune, Japanese waka poet and writer (d. 1221)
- Azzo VI d'Este (or Azzolino), Italian nobleman (d. 1212)
- Bahauddin Zakariya, Ghurid scholar and poet (d. 1262)
- Erard of Brienne-Ramerupt, French nobleman (d. 1246)
- Ermengarde de Beaumont, queen of Scotland (d. 1233)
- Eustace the Monk, French mercenary and pirate (d. 1217)
- Franca Visalta, Italian nun and abbess (approximate date)
- Gebhard I of Plain (or Pleyen), German bishop (d. 1232)
- Giovanni Colonna (the Younger), Italian cardinal (d. 1245)
- Henry Borwin II (or Burwy), German nobleman (d. 1226)
- Hubert de Burgh, English Chief Justiciar (approximate date)
- John of Brienne (or John I), king of Jerusalem (d. 1237)
- Leonardo of Pisa, Italian mathematician (approximate date)
- Lope Díaz II, Castilian nobleman (House of Haro) (d. 1236)
- Maelgwn ap Rhys, Welsh prince of Deheubarth (d. 1230)
- Matilda of Boulogne, duchess of Brabant (approximate date)
- Minamoto no Ienaga, Japanese nobleman and poet (d. 1234)
- Muqali (or Mukhhulai), Mongol military leader (d. 1223)
- Pons d'Ortaffa, Catalan nobleman and troubadour (d. 1246)
- Ranulf de Blondeville, English nobleman and regent (d. 1232)
- Richard de Percy, English nobleman (approximate date)
- Rodrigo Jiménez de Rada, Navarrese bishop (d. 1247)
- Roger de Lacy, English nobleman and crusader (d. 1211)
- Saer de Quincy, 1st Earl of Winchester (approximate date)
- Sophia of Wittelsbach, German noblewoman (d. 1238)
- Theoderich II von Wied, German archbishop (d. 1242)
- Walther von der Vogelweide, German lyrical poet (d. 1230)
- Xiang Zong, Chinese emperor of Western Xia (d. 1211)
- Zhao Rukuo, Chinese historian and politician (d. 1231)
- Uberto Visconti, lord of Massino, Albizzate and Besnate (d. 1248)

== Deaths ==
- January 22 – Wang Chongyang, Chinese philosopher (b. 1113)
- April 23 – Minamoto no Tametomo, Japanese samurai (b. 1139)
- May 6 – Lope Díaz I de Haro, Castilian nobleman (b. 1105)
- May 21 – Godric of Finchale, English hermit and merchant
- July 25 – Reginald II of Bar (or Renaud), French nobleman
- August 19 – Mstislav II Izyaslavich, Grand Prince of Kiev
- September 6 – Qutb al-Din Mawdud, Zangid ruler of Mosul
- September 14 – Heilika of Lengenfeld, German countess
- November 18 – Albert I (the Bear), German nobleman
- November 20 – Gerung of Meissen, German bishop
- December 20 – Al-Mustanjid, Abbasid caliph (b. 1124)
- December 29 – Thomas Becket, English archbishop
- Abu Hamid al-Gharnati, Andalusian traveller (b. 1080)
- Aindileas Ua Chlúmháin, Irish chief poet and writer
- Christina Björnsdotter, queen of Sweden (b. 1120)
- Eliezer ben Nathan, German rabbi and poet (b. 1090)
- Gerlach of Valkenburg, Dutch hermit (b. 1100)
- Gonçalo Mendes da Maia, Portuguese knight
- Hywel ab Owain Gwynedd, king of Gwynedd
- Ibn Zafar al-Siqilli, Arab-Sicilian politician (b. 1104)
- Joseph Kimhi, Spanish rabbi and poet (b. 1105)
- Owain ap Gruffudd, king of Gwynedd (b. 1100)
- Robert Fitzharding, English nobleman (b. 1095)
- Ruben II (or Roupen), Armenian prince (b. 1165)
- Zishou Miaozong, Chinese Zen master (b. 1095)
