= 1231 =

1231 in various calendars
- Gregorian calendar: 1231; MCCXXXI
- Ab urbe condita: 1984
- Armenian calendar: 680; ԹՎ ՈՁ
- Assyrian calendar: 5981
- Balinese saka calendar: 1152–1153
- Bengali calendar: 637–638
- Berber calendar: 2181
- English Regnal year: 15 Hen. 3 – 16 Hen. 3
- Buddhist calendar: 1775
- Burmese calendar: 593
- Byzantine calendar: 6739–6740
- Chinese calendar: 庚寅年 (Metal Tiger); 3928 or 3721 — to — 辛卯年 (Metal Rabbit); 3929 or 3722
- Coptic calendar: 947–948
- Discordian calendar: 2397
- Ethiopian calendar: 1223–1224
- Hebrew calendar: 4991–4992
- Hindu calendars
- Vikram Samvat: 1287–1288
- Shaka Samvat: 1152–1153
- Kali Yuga: 4331–4332
- Holocene calendar: 11231
- Igbo calendar: 231–232
- Iranian calendar: 609–610
- Islamic calendar: 628–629
- Japanese calendar: Kangi 3 (寛喜３年)
- Javanese calendar: 1140–1141
- Julian calendar: 1231; MCCXXXI
- Korean calendar: 3564
- Minguo calendar: 681 before ROC 民前681年
- Nanakshahi calendar: −237
- Thai solar calendar: 1773–1774
- Tibetan calendar: ལྕགས་ཕོ་སྟག་ལོ་ (male Iron-Tiger); 1357 or 976 or 204 — to — ལྕགས་མོ་ཡོས་ལོ་ (female Iron-Hare); 1358 or 977 or 205

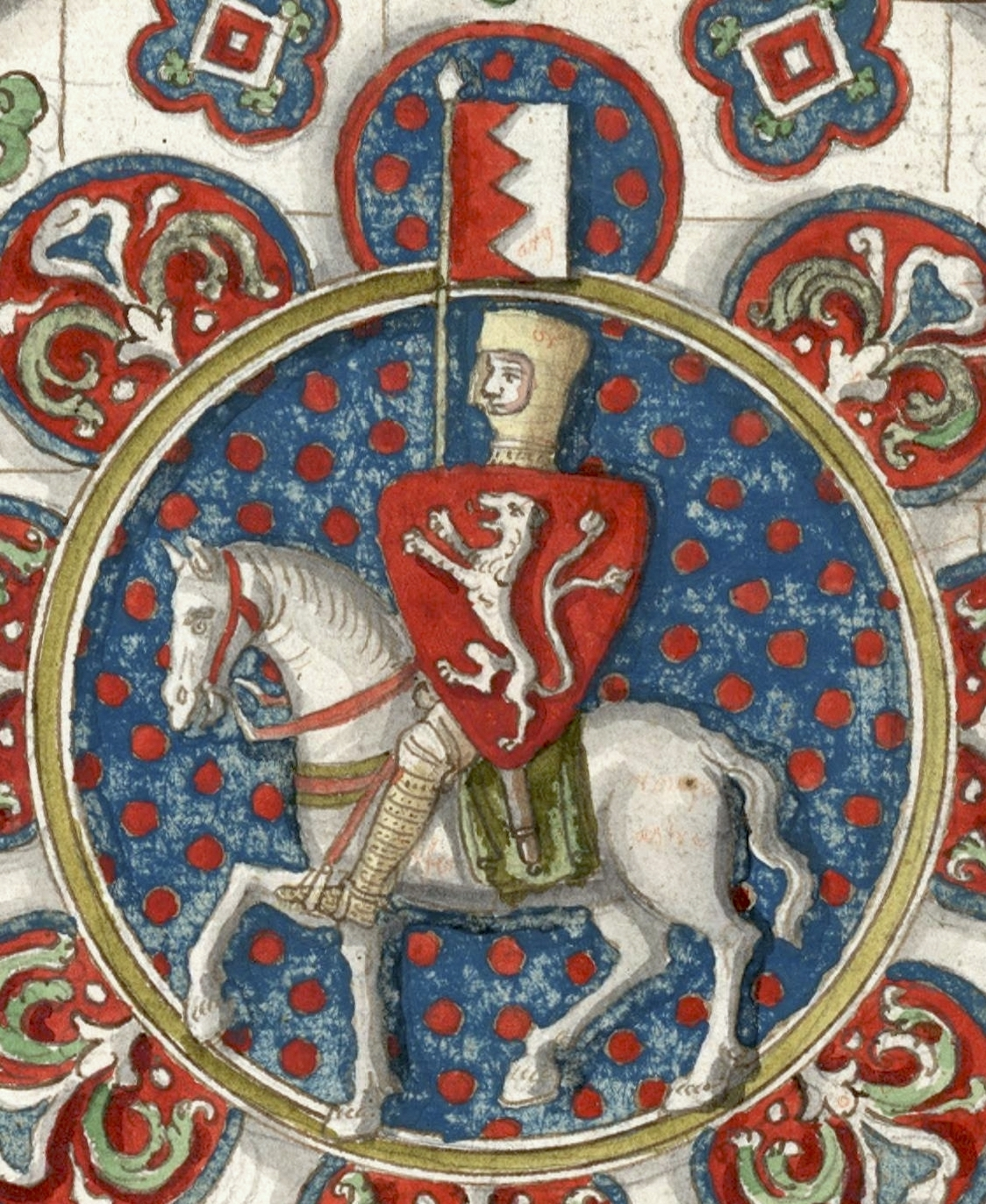
Simon de Montfort (c. 1208–1265)

Year 1231 (MCCXXXI) was a common year starting on Wednesday of the Julian calendar.

== Events ==
=== By place ===
==== Europe ====
- Emperor Frederick II promulgates the Constitutions of Melfi (Liber Augustalis), a collection of laws for Sicily, as well as the Edict of Salerno, regulating the exercise of medicine and separating the professions of physician and apothecary, and requiring medical schools to practice dissection.
- Reconquista:
  - Castilian forces under King Ferdinand III ("the Saint") re-conquer the city of Quesada.
  - Battle of Jerez: Ferdinand III defeats Emir Ibn Hud of the Taifa of Murcia.
- Peter des Roches, Bishop of Winchester, negotiates a 3-year truce between England and France.

==== Britain ====
- Spring – Hubert de Burgh, Earl of Kent becomes a powerful lord in the Welsh Marches, controlling the castles at Cardigan and Carmarthen. He begins to threaten the local Welsh leaders, Llywelyn the Great launches a campaign against Norman lordship in Wales.
- August 13 – King Henry III orders the sheriffs of Hampshire, Dorsetshire and Wiltshire to give Simon de Montfort the possession of the lands of his father, Simon de Montfort the elder.
- December – Henry III ends his Welsh campaign and makes peace with Llywelyn the Great.
- The University of Cambridge is recognised by a writ of authority over its townspeople from Henry III.

==== Levant ====
- Autumn – Frederick II appoints Marshal Richard Filangieri as his imperial legate, and sends an expeditionary army of mostly Lombards for the defense of Jerusalem. He gathers some 600 knights, 100 "sergeants-at-arms", 700 armed infantrymen, and 3,000 marines. The army is supported by 32 war-galleys.
- War of the Lombards: Richard Filangieri sails for Beirut, where the town is handed over to him. He occupies Sidon and Tyre – while other Lombard forces appear before Acre. At Acre, Filangieri summons a meeting of the High Court and shows letters from Frederick II appointing him as ambassador (baili).

==== China ====
- April 9 – A huge fire breaks out at night in the southeast of Hangzhou during the Song dynasty. Fighting the flames is difficult due to limited visibility. When the fires are extinguished, it is discovered that an entire district of the city (some 10,000 houses) has been consumed by the flames.

==== Mongol Empire ====
- August – Ögedei Khan orders the invasion of Korea. A Mongol army crosses the Yalu River and quickly secures the surrender of the border town of Uiju. The Mongols are joined by Hong Pok-wŏn, a Goryeo general, who takes their side with his subordinates numbering some 1500 families.
- Siege of Kuju: Mongol forces besiege the city of Kuju. They deploy assault teams who man siege towers and scale ladders. Despite the fact the Goryeo army is heavily outnumbered, the garrison refuses to surrender.

=== By topic ===
==== Religion ====
- April 13 – Pope Gregory IX issues Parens scientiarum. The bull assures the independence and self-governance of the University of Paris.

== Births ==
- March 17 – Shijō (Mitsuhito), emperor of Japan (d. 1242)
- Guo Shoujing, Chinese astronomer and engineer (d. 1316)
- James Salomoni, Italian Dominican priest and prior (d. 1314)
- John de Warenne, English nobleman and knight (d. 1304)
- John of Burgundy, French nobleman and knight (d. 1268)
- Philip of Castile, Spanish prince and archbishop (d. 1274)
- Roger Mortimer, English nobleman and knight (d. 1282)
- Tommaso degli Stefani, Italian painter and artist (d. 1310)
- Yolanda of Vianden, Luxembourgish prioress (d. 1283)

== Deaths ==
- April 6 – William Marshal, English nobleman (b. 1190)
- May 7 – Beatrice II, French countess palatine (b. 1193)
- June 13 – Anthony of Padua, Portuguese priest (b. 1195)
- July 2 – Henry I, German nobleman (House of Zähringen)
- August 3 – Richard le Grant, archbishop of Canterbury
- August 28 – Eleanor of Portugal, queen consort of Denmark
- September – Ibn Muti al-Zawawi, Almohad jurist, philologian and writer
- September 3 – William II, French nobleman (b. 1196)
- September 15 – Louis I, German nobleman (b. 1173)
- November 3 – Władysław III, Polish nobleman (b. 1167)
- November 6 – Tsuchimikado, emperor of Japan (b. 1196)
- November 9 – Abd al-Latif al-Baghdadi, Abbasid physician (b. 1162)
- November 17 – Elizabeth, Hungarian princess (b. 1207)
- November 28 – Valdemar the Young, king of Denmark
- December 7 – Richardis, German noblewoman (b. 1173)
- December 11 – Ida of Nivelles, Flemish nun and mystic
- December 25 – Folquet de Marselha, French bishop
- Abu Said al-Baji, Almohad leader and scholar (b. 1156)
- Aurembiaix, Spanish countess (House of Urgell) (b. 1196)
- Dúinnín Ó Maolconaire, Irish historian, poet and writer
- Elisabeth of Brandenburg, Landgravine of Thuringia, German noblewoman (b. 1206)
- Gonzalo Rodríguez Girón, Spanish nobleman (b. 1160)
- Ibn al-Qattan, Almohad imam, scholar and intellectual
- Jalal al-Din Mangburni, ruler of the Khwarazmian Empire
- Matthew FitzHerbert, English nobleman and high sheriff
- Meinhard II, Count of Gorizia ("the Elder"), German nobleman and knight
- William of Auxerre, French archdeacon and theologian
- Zhao Rukuo, Chinese historian and politician (b. 1170)
