= Shizi =

Shizi may refer to:

- Shizi (book), a 4th-century BCE Syncretic philosophy text
- Shizi, Langxi County (十字镇), town in Langxi County, Anhui
- Shizi, Quanjiao County (十字镇), town in Quanjiao County, Anhui
- Ou Shizi (1234–1324), Song dynasty scholar

The Chinese word for lion (獅子)

- Chinese guardian lions, a common representation of the lion in imperial China
- Shih Tzu, a dog breed named after the Chinese lion guardians
- Pekingese, a dog breed called shizi (lion) by the Chinese
- Shizi, Qichun County (狮子镇), town in Qichun County, Huanggang, Hubei
- Shizi, a village in Xinghua Township, Hong'an County, Huanggang, Hubei
- Shizi, Pingtung (獅子鄉), township in Pingtung County, Taiwan

== See also ==
- Shizi (fruit)
