= Pacificus (disambiguation) =

Pacificus is the name of multiple persons:

- Pacificus of Verona (c. 776–844), a 9th-century Carolingian Italian religious leader
- Pacificus (died 1234), a disciple of St. Francis of Assisi
- Pacificus of San Severino (1653–1721), the seventeenth-century saint
- Pacificus was a pen name of Alexander Hamilton (1755 or 1757–1804)
