= 1283 =

1283 in various calendars
- Gregorian calendar: 1283; MCCLXXXIII
- Ab urbe condita: 2036
- Armenian calendar: 732; ԹՎ ՉԼԲ
- Assyrian calendar: 6033
- Balinese saka calendar: 1204–1205
- Bengali calendar: 689–690
- Berber calendar: 2233
- English Regnal year: 11 Edw. 1 – 12 Edw. 1
- Buddhist calendar: 1827
- Burmese calendar: 645
- Byzantine calendar: 6791–6792
- Chinese calendar: 壬午年 (Water Horse); 3980 or 3773 — to — 癸未年 (Water Goat); 3981 or 3774
- Coptic calendar: 999–1000
- Discordian calendar: 2449
- Ethiopian calendar: 1275–1276
- Hebrew calendar: 5043–5044
- Hindu calendars
- Vikram Samvat: 1339–1340
- Shaka Samvat: 1204–1205
- Kali Yuga: 4383–4384
- Holocene calendar: 11283
- Igbo calendar: 283–284
- Iranian calendar: 661–662
- Islamic calendar: 681–682
- Japanese calendar: Kōan 6 (弘安６年)
- Javanese calendar: 1193–1194
- Julian calendar: 1283; MCCLXXXIII
- Korean calendar: 3616
- Minguo calendar: 629 before ROC 民前629年
- Nanakshahi calendar: −185
- Thai solar calendar: 1825–1826
- Tibetan calendar: ཆུ་ཕོ་རྟ་ལོ་ (male Water-Horse); 1409 or 1028 or 256 — to — ཆུ་མོ་ལུག་ལོ་ (female Water-Sheep); 1410 or 1029 or 257

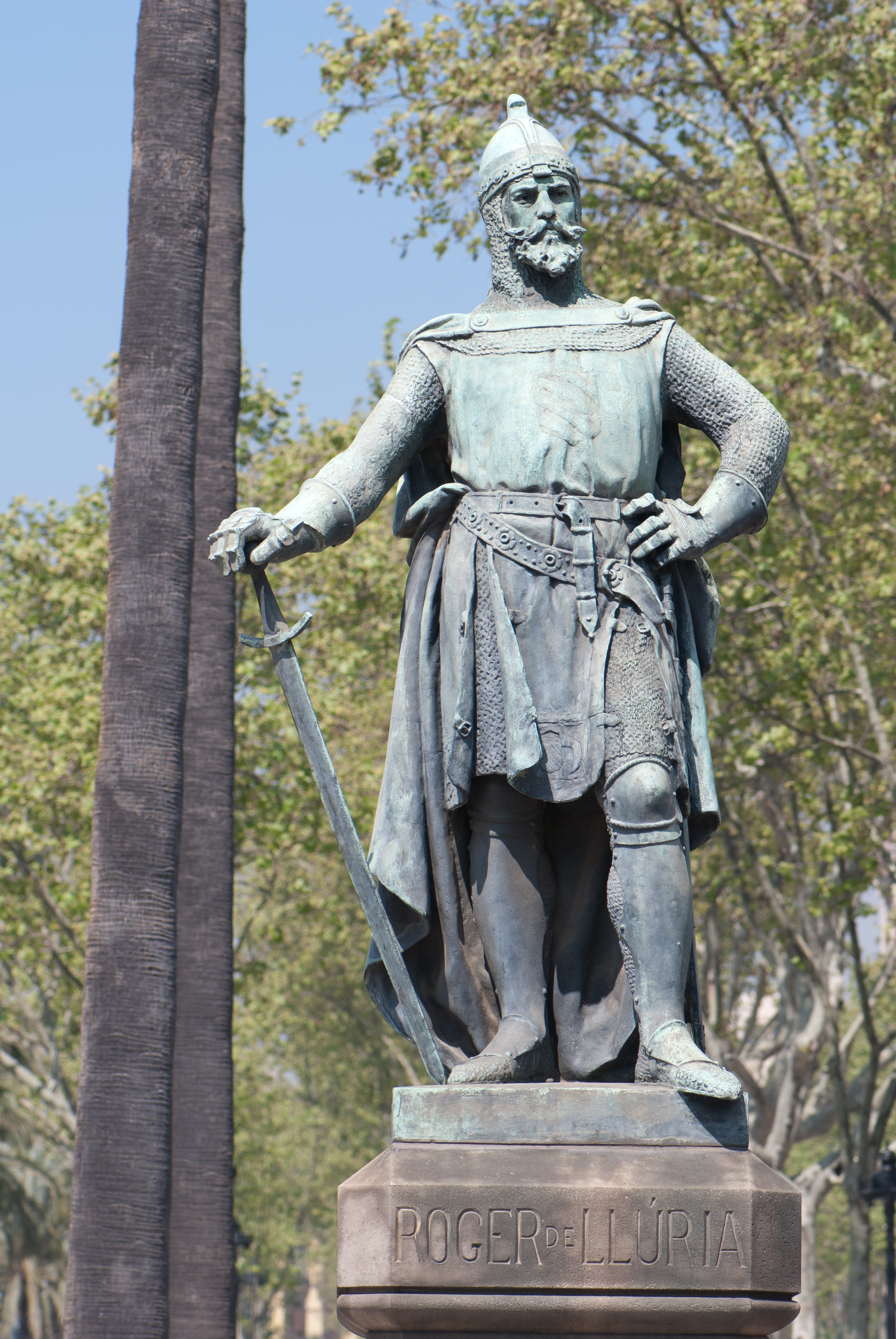
Roger of Lauria (c. 1245–1305)

Year 1283 (MCCLXXXIII) was a common year starting on Friday of the Julian calendar.

== Events ==
=== By place ===
==== Europe ====
- June 1 – Treaty of Rheinfelden: The 11-year-old Rudolf II is forced to relinquish his claim on the Duchies of Austria and Styria to his elder brother, Albert I. According to the terms of the agreement, concluded at the Imperial City of Rheinfelden (modern Switzerland), Rudolf receives some territories in Further Austria in return.
- June 29 – Sultan Abu Yusuf Yaqub ibn Abd al-Haqq sets out for a punitive expedition and marches from Córdoba to Jaén and Úbeda, and then northwards through difficult terrain. On the third day after crossing al-burt, the Marinid forces attack Montiel (a fortress belonging to the Order of Santiago) and Almedina.
- July 8 – Battle of Malta: An Aragonese fleet (some 20 galleys) under Admiral Roger of Lauria attacks and defeats the Angevin ships in the Grand Harbour, sent to help put down a rebellion on Malta. Lauria lands his troops at the harbour and after two days raises his banner on the fortified city of Mdina ("Old City").
- The first regulated Catalan Courts are reunited by King Peter III, for the whole Principality of Catalonia. It became one of the first medieval parliaments that bans the royal power to create legislation unilaterally.
- King Philip III of France ("the Bold") outlaws Jews from residence in the small villages and rural localities of France, causing a mass migration.
- An earthquake destroys two thirds of the cave city of Vardzia, Georgia.

==== British Isles ====
- January 2 – Most of Dublin, including St. Patrick's Cathedral, is burned in a fire.
- January 18 – King Edward I of England ("Longshanks") captures Dolwyddelan Castle in North Wales from the Welsh.
- April 25 – The last independent Welsh stronghold, Castell y Bere, is surrendered by Cynfrig ap Madog to the English.
- June 28 – A parliament of England summoned by Edward I to assemble at Shrewsbury Abbey to decide the fate of the Welsh prince Dafydd ap Gruffydd (captured on June 22) is the first to include commoners.
- October 3 – The last ruler of an independent Wales, Dafydd ap Gruffydd (David), Prince of Wales, is executed in Shrewsbury, the first prominent person in history to be hanged, drawn and quartered, as capital punishment for the newly created crime of high treason (against Edward I of England).
- Castles and Town Walls of King Edward in Gwynedd: Construction of Caernarfon Castle, Conwy Castle and Harlech Castle in Wales by Edward I of England begins as a system of defenses against possible future Welsh uprisings.

==== Levant ====
- June – Qalawun ("the Victorious"), Mamluk ruler of Egypt, signs a peace treaty for 10 years with the Crusader States at Caesarea. It guarantees the Crusaders the possession of the territory from the Ladder of Tyre, north of Acre, to Mount Carmel and Atlit. But Tyre and Beirut are excluded. The right of free pilgrimage to Nazareth is permitted for the Christians.

==== Africa ====
- Abu Ishaq Ibrahim I, ruler of the Hafsid Sultanate, is overthrown by the Bedouin rebellion, led by Abd al-Aziz I.

==== Asia ====
- February 13–14 – Battle of Thị Nại Bay: A Mongol-led Yuan expeditionary force (some 5,000 men) lands on the beach, near Champa's capital Vijaya in Vietnam. Despite being outnumbered, the Yuan invaders break the Cham defensive line and force King Indravarman V to retreat to the Western Highlands, where he wages a successful guerrilla campaign against the occupying Yuan forces.
- Mongol invasion of Burma: Mongol forces besiege the fortress at Ngasaunggyan on September 23. The Burmese garrison withstands the siege for two months, but finally falls to the invaders on December 3. The defeat breaks the morale of the Burmese defenses. Kaungsin, the next fortress in line, falls just six days later.
- Mongol forces invade the Khmer Empire (modern Cambodia). King Jayavarman VIII decides to pay tribute rather than fight the invasion, buying peace and preserving the empire.
- Ram Khamhaeng, ruler of the Sukhothai Kingdom, creates the Thai alphabet during his reign (approximate date).

=== By topic ===
==== The arts, culture and literature ====
- The Libro de los juegos, an early European treatise on board games (including chess, dice, and a version of backgammon), is commissioned by King Alfonso X of Castile ("the Wise") (approximate date).
- Ramon Llull, Spanish theologian, writes Blanquerna, the first major work of literature written in Catalan, and perhaps the first European novel.

==== Markets ====
- The German city of Goslar starts making efforts to redeem its already issued annuities, a sure indication of financial difficulty, and maybe an early sign of the 13th century crisis.

== Births ==
- April 9 – Margaret, Maid of Norway, queen-designate of Scotland (d. 1290)
- Anthony de Lucy (or Luci), English nobleman and knight (d. 1343)
- Fujiwara no Kinshi, Japanese empress consort and nun (d. 1352)
- Galvano Fiamma, Italian Dominican friar and chronicler (d. 1344)
- Isabella of Castile, queen consort of Aragon, daughter of Sancho IV ("the Brave") (d. 1328)
- John of Charolais (or Clermont), French nobleman (d. 1322)
- Matteo Villani, Italian historian, chronicler and writer (d. 1363)
- Shuho Myocho, Japanese teacher and Zen Master (d. 1338)
- Siemowit II of Masovia, Polish nobleman and prince (d. 1345)
- Yoshida Kenkō, Japanese Buddhist monk and writer (d. 1350)

== Deaths ==
- January 9 – Wen Tianxiang, Chinese poet and politician (b. 1236)
- February/March – Yaghmurasen ibn Zyan, Zayyanid ruler of Tlemcen (b. 1206)
- March 23 – Joseph I of Constantinople (Galesiotes), Byzantine abbot and patriarch
- April 9 – Margaret of Scotland, Queen of Norway, the Maid of Scotland, queen consort of Norway (b. 1261)
- April 23 – John Bradfield, English bishop and precentor
- June 7 – Robert of Holy Island, English Benedictine monk and bishop
- August 12 – Blanche of Navarre, Duchess of Brittany, Breton noblewoman (b. 1226)
- September 26 – Princess Kuniko (or Hoshi), Japanese empress (b. 1209)
- October 3 – Dafydd ap Gruffydd, Welsh prince (b. 1238)
- October 10 – Peter of Castile, Lord of Ledesma, Spanish prince (infante) (b. 1260)
- October 15 – John I of Werle, German nobleman (House of Mecklenburg)
- November 27 – John of Montfort, Lord of Tyre, Outremer nobleman and knight
- November 30 – John of Vercelli, Italian Master General (b. 1205)
- December 8 – Richard of Ware, English abbot and theologian
- December 15 – Philip I (or Courtenay), Latin Emperor of Constantinople (b. 1243)
- December 25 – Manuel of Castile, Spanish nobleman (b. 1234)
- Abutsu-ni, Japanese noblewoman, nun, poet and writer (b. 1222)
- Ata-Malik Juvayni, Persian ruler, historian and writer (b. 1226)
- Hermann III, German nobleman (House of Ascania) (b. 1230)
- Siraj al-Din Urmavi, Ayyubid scholar and philosopher (b. 1198)
- Xie Daoqing, Chinese empress consort and regent (b. 1210)
- Yolanda of Vianden, Luxembourgian nun and prioress (b. 1231)
- Zakariya al-Qazwini, Persian astronomer and writer (b. 1203)
