= Masuccio Segondo =

Italian architect

Masuccio Segondo (1291–1387) was an Italian architect of the 14th century period, active in Naples.

He was born to Pietro degli Stefani, but was the godson to Masuccio Primo, hence his name. He traveled to Rome for some years. King Robert of Naples commissioned the church of Santa Chiara, but Masuccio remained in Rome, and hence came to the construction project after it had been started. He designed the church of Santa Maddalena sul colle Echia, San Martino, and the bell tower of Santa Chiara.
