= Almedina =

Municipality in Spain

- Municipality
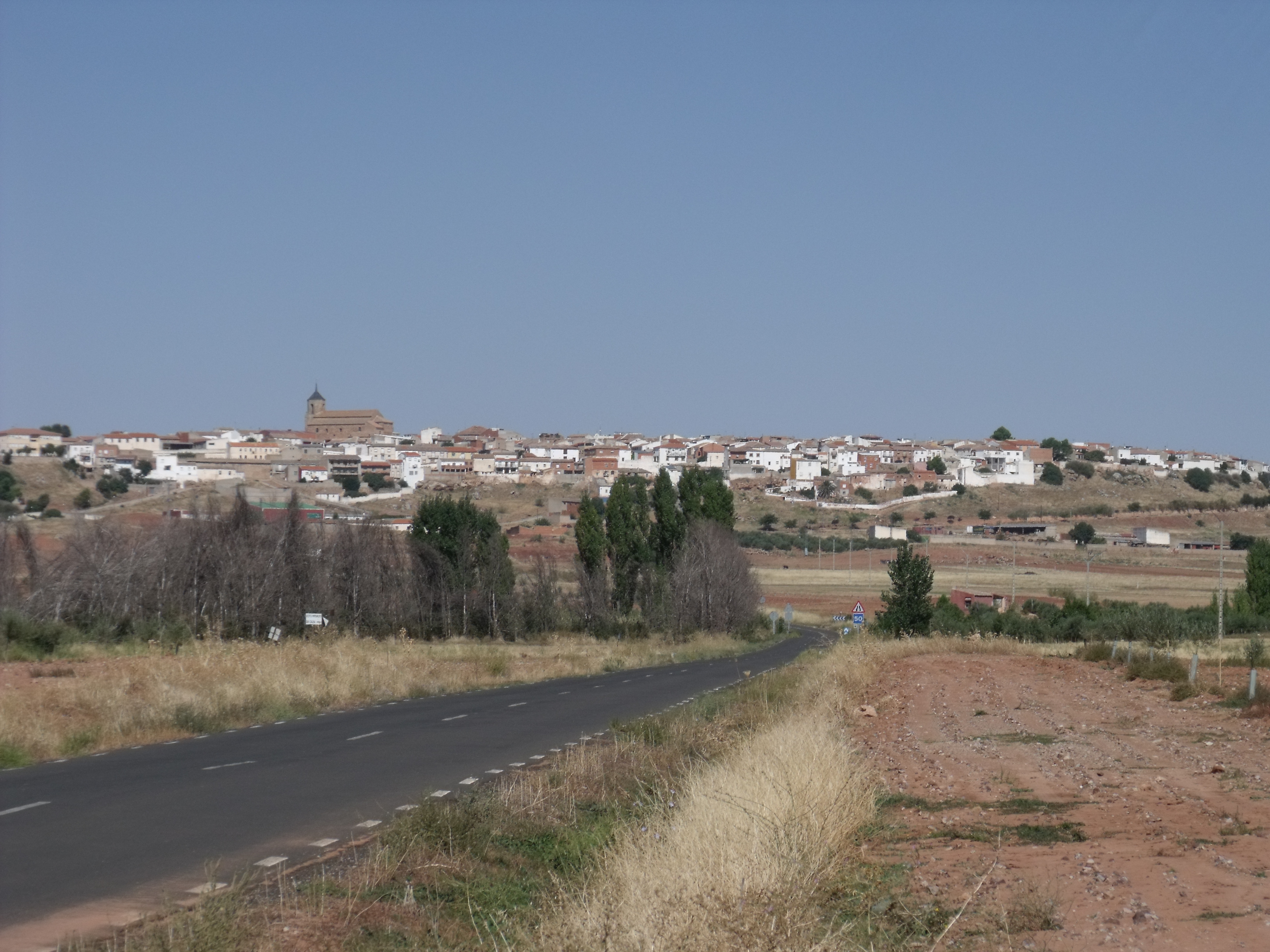
- View of Almedina

- Flag Coat of arms

- Location within Spain
- Coordinates: 38°37′26.8″N 2°57′18.4″W
- Country: Spain
- A. Community: Castilla-La Mancha
- Province: Ciudad Real

Government
  - Mayor: José Antonio Talavera

Area
  - Total: 55.90 km^{2} (21.58 sq mi)

Population (January 1, 2021)
  - Total: 494
  - Density: 8.837/km^{2} (22.89/sq mi)
- Time zone: UTC+01:00 (CET)
- Postal code: 13328
- Area code: 13014
- Website: Official website

Almedina is a municipality in Ciudad Real, Castile-La Mancha, Spain.
