= Masuccio Primo =

Italian architect and sculptor

Masuccio Primo (or Masuccio I) (1230–1306) was an Italian architect and sculptor of the 13th century, and was active in Naples. He was the godfather of the son of Pietro degli Stefani, known as Masuccio Segondo (1291–1387).
