= 1145 =

1145 in various calendars
- Gregorian calendar: 1145; MCXLV
- Ab urbe condita: 1898
- Armenian calendar: 594; ԹՎ ՇՂԴ
- Assyrian calendar: 5895
- Balinese saka calendar: 1066–1067
- Bengali calendar: 551–552
- Berber calendar: 2095
- English Regnal year: 10 Ste. 1 – 11 Ste. 1
- Buddhist calendar: 1689
- Burmese calendar: 507
- Byzantine calendar: 6653–6654
- Chinese calendar: 甲子年 (Wood Rat); 3842 or 3635 — to — 乙丑年 (Wood Ox); 3843 or 3636
- Coptic calendar: 861–862
- Discordian calendar: 2311
- Ethiopian calendar: 1137–1138
- Hebrew calendar: 4905–4906
- Hindu calendars
- Vikram Samvat: 1201–1202
- Shaka Samvat: 1066–1067
- Kali Yuga: 4245–4246
- Holocene calendar: 11145
- Igbo calendar: 145–146
- Iranian calendar: 523–524
- Islamic calendar: 539–540
- Japanese calendar: Ten'yō 2 / Kyūan 1 (久安元年)
- Javanese calendar: 1051–1052
- Julian calendar: 1145; MCXLV
- Korean calendar: 3478
- Minguo calendar: 767 before ROC 民前767年
- Nanakshahi calendar: −323
- Seleucid era: 1456/1457 AG
- Thai solar calendar: 1687–1688
- Tibetan calendar: ཤིང་ཕོ་བྱི་བ་ལོ་ (male Wood-Rat); 1271 or 890 or 118 — to — ཤིང་མོ་གླང་ལོ་ (female Wood-Ox); 1272 or 891 or 119

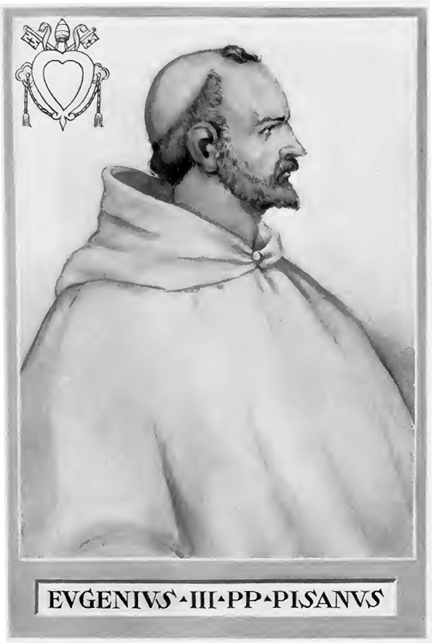
Pope Eugene III (1080–1153)

Year 1145 (MCXLV) was a common year starting on Monday of the Julian calendar.

== Events ==
=== By place ===
==== Levant ====
- Spring – Seljuk forces led by Imad al-Din Zengi capture Saruj, the second great Crusader fortress east of the Euphrates. They advance to Birejik and besiege the city, but the garrison puts up a stiff resistance. Meanwhile, Queen-Regent Melisende of Jerusalem joins forces with Joscelin II, count of Edessa and approaches the city. Zengi raises the siege after hearing rumours of trouble in Mosul. He rushes back with his army to take control. There, Zengi is praised throughout Islam as "defender of the faith" and al-Malik al-Mansur, the "victorious king".
- Raymond of Poitiers, prince of Antioch, travels to Constantinople to ask Emperor Manuel I Komnenos for help to support his campaign against the Seljuks. When he arrives, Raymond is forced to accept the suzerainty of the Byzantine Empire. Manuel treats him graciously, gives him gifts and promises him a money subsidy.

==== Europe ====
- Spring – Arnold of Brescia, an Italian priest from Lombardy, turns Rome into a republic with a government patterned on that of the Roman Republic. Arnold becomes the intellectual leader of the Commune of Rome, calling for liberties and democratic rights after the deposition of Giordano Pierleoni.

==== Africa ====
- Spring – Almohad forces under Abd al-Mu'min defeat a Muslim Almoravid army at Tlemcen. Almoravid ruler Tashfin ibn Ali dies while escaping his enemies near Oran. He is succeeded by his son Ibrahim ibn Tashfin.
- The Merinids of Maghrib al-Aqsa attempt to resist the Almohads but are forced into the desert areas around the Tafilalt. Oran falls to the Almohads. A Norman raid against the Tripolitania region succeeds.

==== Asia ====
- Estimation: Merv (in the Seljuk Empire) becomes the largest city in the world, surpassing Constantinople.

=== By topic ===
==== Art and Culture ====
- Kim Pusik and his team of historians finish the compilation of the Korean historical text Samguk Sagi.
- Construction begins on Notre-Dame de Chartres Cathedral in Chartres, France.

==== Religion ====
- February 15 – Pope Lucius II dies at Rome after having been hit by a stone missile during the fighting against Senatorial forces led by Giordano Pierleoni. He is succeeded after an 11-month pontificate by Eugene III who becomes the 167th pope of the Catholic Church. Eugene is forced into exile by Arnold of Brescia.
- Woburn Abbey is founded by the Cistercians in England. A colony of monks arrive from Fountains Abbey to establish a community that will survive until 1234.
- December 1 – Eugene III issues the bull Quantum praedecessores, calling for the Second Crusade. At Christmas, King Louis VII announces his intention of making a pilgrimage which becomes part of the Crusade.

== Births ==
- Al-Adil I, Ayyubid general and sultan (d. 1218)
- Adalbert III, archbishop of Salzburg (d. 1200)
- Adam of Perseigne, French Cistercian abbot (d. 1221)
- Aoife MacMurrough (or Eva), Irish princess (d. 1188)
- Baha ad-Din ibn Shaddad, Arab historian (d. 1234)
- Christina Hvide, queen of Sweden (approximate date)
- Elizabeth of Hungary, German duchess (d. 1189)
- Gregory IX, pope of the Catholic Church (d. 1241)
- Ibn Jubayr, Andalusian geographer and traveller (d. 1217)
- Margaret of Huntingdon, Scottish princess (d. 1201)
- Maria of Antioch, Byzantine empress and regent (d. 1182)
- Marie of Champagne, French noblewoman (d. 1198)
- Manuel Komnenos, son of Andronikos I (d. 1185)
- Najmuddin Kubra, founder of the Kubrawi order (d. 1221)
- Reginald Fitzurse, English knight and assassin (d. 1173)
- Ruben III, ruler of the Armenian Kingdom of Cilicia (d. 1187)
- Shihab al-Din 'Umar al-Suhrawardi, Persian scholar (d. 1234)
- Theodora Komnene, queen of Jerusalem (approximate date)

== Deaths ==
- February 15 – Lucius II, pope of the Catholic Church
- March 23 – Tashfin ibn Ali, Almoravid emir
- April 5 – Gabriel II, patriarch of Alexandria
- October 6 – Baldwin, archbishop of Pisa
- November 26 – Bellinus of Padua, Italian bishop
- Fujiwara no Tamako, Japanese empress (b. 1101)
- Magnus Haraldsson, king of Norway (approximate date)
- Sophia of Bavaria, German noblewoman (b. 1105)
- William of Malines, Flemish priest (approximate date)
- Zhang Zeduan, Chinese landscape painter (b. 1085)
