= 1198 =

1198 in various calendars
- Gregorian calendar: 1198; MCXCVIII
- Ab urbe condita: 1951
- Armenian calendar: 647; ԹՎ ՈԽԷ
- Assyrian calendar: 5948
- Balinese saka calendar: 1119–1120
- Bengali calendar: 604–605
- Berber calendar: 2148
- English Regnal year: 9 Ric. 1 – 10 Ric. 1
- Buddhist calendar: 1742
- Burmese calendar: 560
- Byzantine calendar: 6706–6707
- Chinese calendar: 丁巳年 (Fire Snake); 3895 or 3688 — to — 戊午年 (Earth Horse); 3896 or 3689
- Coptic calendar: 914–915
- Discordian calendar: 2364
- Ethiopian calendar: 1190–1191
- Hebrew calendar: 4958–4959
- Hindu calendars
- Vikram Samvat: 1254–1255
- Shaka Samvat: 1119–1120
- Kali Yuga: 4298–4299
- Holocene calendar: 11198
- Igbo calendar: 198–199
- Iranian calendar: 576–577
- Islamic calendar: 594–595
- Japanese calendar: Kenkyū 9 (建久９年)
- Javanese calendar: 1106–1107
- Julian calendar: 1198; MCXCVIII
- Korean calendar: 3531
- Minguo calendar: 714 before ROC 民前714年
- Nanakshahi calendar: −270
- Seleucid era: 1509/1510 AG
- Thai solar calendar: 1740–1741
- Tibetan calendar: མེ་མོ་སྦྲུལ་ལོ་ (female Fire-Snake); 1324 or 943 or 171 — to — ས་ཕོ་རྟ་ལོ་ (male Earth-Horse); 1325 or 944 or 172

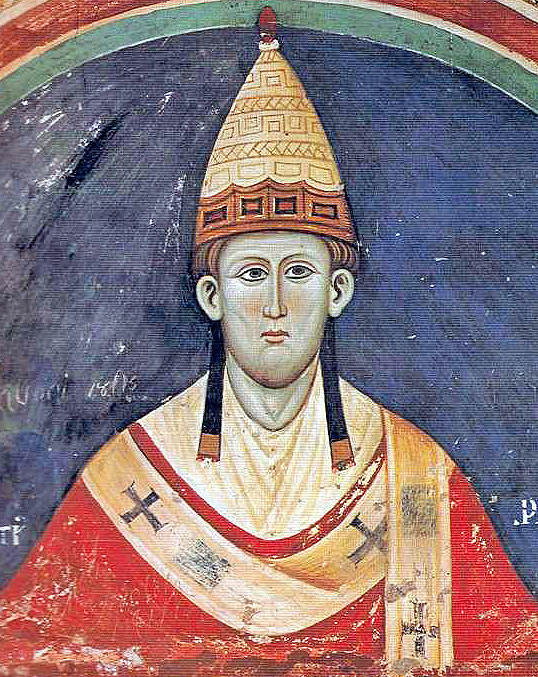
Pope Innocent III (r. 1198–1216)

Year 1198 (MCXCVIII) was a common year starting on Thursday of the Julian calendar.

== Events ==
=== By place ===
==== Europe ====
- March 8 – Philip of Swabia, son of the late Emperor Frederick I, is elected "King of Germany" by his supporters at Mühlhausen in Thuringia. Archbishop Adolf of Cologne elects Otto of Brunswick, son of Henry the Lion, as Philip's rival. Otto IV is crowned as King of the Romans in Aachen by supporters of the House of Welf. Philip's coronation does not take place until September 8, at Mainz.
- May 17 – Frederick II, infant son of the late Emperor Henry VI, is crowned King of Sicily. His mother, Queen Constance I becomes regent, while she surrounds herself with local advisors. On November 27, Constance dies in the royal palace at Palermo. She is succeeded by the new pope, Innocent III, who becomes Frederick's guardian and mentor.

==== England ====
- John of England captures a party of 18 French knights and many men-at-arms, in the ongoing conflict against France. His brother, King Richard I (the Lionheart) introduces a new Great Seal – in an attempt to keep the war against France funded. The government proclaims that charters previously struck with the old seal are no longer valid and must be renewed with a fresh payment. The office of Lord Warden of the Stannaries is also introduced, to tax the produce of tin mines in Cornwall and Devon.
- September 27 – Battle of Gisors: Richard I defeats the French forces led by Philip II (Augustus) at Courcelles-lès-Gisors, in Picardy. Richard captures three castles on the border of the Vexin. The French troops, many of them mounted, crowd the bridge leading into Gisors Castle but it collapses beneath them. The French king is among those who plunge into the water in his armor. Many French knights drown, but Philip is pulled to safety.

==== Levant ====
- January 6; Prince Leo II of Cilician Armenia crowned as Leo I – king of Armenia
- Spring – Amalric I, ruler of Cyprus, marries Princess Isabella I, daughter of the late King Amalric I. A few days later they are crowned as King and Queen of Jerusalem at Acre. On July 1, Amalric signs a truce with Al-Adil I, sultan of Egypt and Syria, securing the Crusader possessions from Acre to as far as Antioch.

==== Asia ====
- February 18 – Emperor Go-Toba (or Toba the Second) abdicates the throne in favor of his two-year-old son Tsuchimikado, after a 14-year reign.
- Emperor Ningzong of Song bans the practice of Neo-Confucianism.

=== By topic ===
==== Literature ====
- December 11 – Averroes (or Ibn Rushd), Arab polymath and physician, dies. He is the author of more than 100 books, for which he is known in the western world as The Commentator and Father of Rationalism.

==== Religion ====
- January 8 – Pope Celestine III dies at Rome, after a pontificate of nearly 7 years. He is succeeded by Innocent III, as the 176th pope of the Catholic Church. Shortly after he lays an interdict on Laon, in an attempt to create independent beliefs there. This will be followed by interdicts against France in 1199, and Normandy in 1203.
- Innocent III excommunicates Philip II for repudiating his marriage to Ingeborg of Denmark (see 1193), to whom he took an almost instant dislike, but public opinion forces Philip to effect a reconciliation with the pope.

== Births ==
- May 4 – Kyaswa, ruler of the Pagan Empire (d. 1251)
- July 11 – Hōjō Shigetoki, Japanese samurai (d. 1261)
- August 24 – Alexander II, king of Scotland (d. 1249)
- September 25 – Ai Zong, Chinese emperor (d. 1234)
- Baldwin III, Flemish nobleman and knight (d. 1244)
- Beatrice of Savoy, countess of Provence (d. 1266)
- Beatrice of Swabia, Holy Roman Empress (d. 1212)
- Hugh I of Châtillon, French nobleman and knight (d. 1248)
- Branca of Portugal, Portuguese princess (d. 1240)
- Fujiwara no Tameie, Japanese waka poet (d. 1275)
- Humbert V de Beaujeu, French constable (d. 1250)
- Jalaluddin Surkh-Posh Bukhari, Arab missionary (d. 1292)
- John de Braose (Tadody), English nobleman (d. 1232)
- Konrad the Curly, Polish nobleman (approximate date)
- Koun Ejō, Japanese Sōtō Zen monk and priest (d. 1280)
- Marie of France, French princess and duchess (d. 1224)
- Minamoto no Ichiman, Japanese nobleman (d. 1203)
- Ordoño Álvarez, Spanish abbot and cardinal (d. 1285)
- Ramon Berenguer IV, Spanish nobleman (d. 1245)
- Siraj al-Din Urmavi, Ayyubid philosopher (d. 1283)
- Sybilla of Lusignan, queen of Lesser Armenia (d. 1230)

== Deaths ==
- January 8 – Celestine III, pope of the Catholic Church (b. 1106)
- February 1 – Walram I (of Laurenburg), German nobleman
- March 11 – Marie of France, French princess and countess (b. 1145)
- April 16 – Frederick I (the Catholic), duke of Austria (b. 1175)
- July 7 – George II (Xiphilinos), patriarch of Constantinople
- July 24 – Berthold of Hanover, German apostle and bishop
- August 13 – Hellicha of Wittelsbach, duchess of Bohemia
- September 10 – Richard FitzNeal, bishop of London (b. 1130)
- November 27
  - Abraham ben David, French rabbi (b. 1125)
  - Constance I, queen regent of Sicily (b. 1154)
- November 29 – Al-Aziz Uthman, sultan of Egypt (b. 1171)
- December 2 – Ruaidrí Ua Conchobair, High King of Ireland
- December 11 – Averroes, Arab judge and physician (b. 1126)
- Abu Madyan, Andalusian mystic and Sufi master (b. 1126)
- Alix of France, French princess and countess (approximate date)
- Constantine II (de Martis), ruler of the Judicate of Logudoro
- Donatus of Ripacandida, Italian monk and saint (b. 1179)
- Dulce of Aragon (or Barcelona), queen of Portugal (b. 1160)
- Nerses of Lambron, Armenian archbishop and writer (b. 1153)
- Walter Fitz Robert, English nobleman and knight (b. 1124)
- William of Newburgh, English historian and writer (b. 1136)
- Yaroslav II Vsevolodovich, Kievan Grand Prince (b. 1139)
