= Ibn al-Khabbaza =

Arab judge, historian and poet (died 1239)

Abu l-Hassan ibn al-Khabbaza (Arabic: أبوالحسن بن الخطاب) (died 1239) was a qadi, historian and poet active during the reign of the Almohad Sultan Abu al-Ala Idris al-Mamun (r. 1227–32) in Seville, al-Andalus and Marrakesh, present-day Morocco.
