= William of Andres =

Benedictine monk

William (c.1177–1234) was a Benedictine monk and historian from the Kingdom of France. He served from 1207 as the proctor for his abbey in its legal battles and then from 1211 as the abbot of the abbey of Saint Sauveur et Sainte Rotrude d'Andres, a position he held until his death. Beginning in the 1220s, he wrote a long chronicle of his abbey, the Chronicon Andrense.

== Life ==
Almost all that is known about William comes from his chronicle. He was probably born not far from the abbey. He says he was about thirty years old when elected abbot, which puts his birth around 1177. He was educated in the monastery before joining it as a monk. He was a monk under Abbot Peter II for two years. Since Peter died in 1195, he must have become a monk in 1193 when he was around sixteen. Given the popularity of William in the region at the time, securely identifying the abbot with a William mentioned in the documentary sources is impossible. Nevertheless, it has been speculated on the basis of some documents that he was born into a bourgeois family of Moulle in the castellany of Saint-Omer and that he was a notary.

From 1207 until 1211, William acted as the community's proctor or attorney in a series of legal actions. (Note: In the course of the proceedings, William travelled nearly 13,000 kilometres (8,100 mi).) These centred around the monks' desire to elect their own abbot rather than accept an appointee from their mother house, the abbey of Charroux. The lawsuits began in 1207, when Abbot Iterius transferred to the sister abbey of Ham-en-Artois and sought to enjoin the monks from electing a successor. William travelled to Charroux to argue the case that a local abbot fluent in Flemish was superior to one sent from Charroux. (Note: This was not just because it was the monks' native tongue, but also the language of the local courts of the counts of Guînes.) He then passed Easter in Paris before going on to the papal court in Viterbo, where he met Pope Innocent III and attended the consecration of Stephen Langton as archbishop of Canterbury. The monks in the meantime had elected an abbot, Simon of Le Wast, and the abbot of Charroux had secured two papal commissions to hear his case at Senlis and Aire-sur-la-Lys. (Note: The duplicate commissions were a legal error.) William returned to Andres, Simon resigned and the monks elected William abbot. He travelled to Aire-sur-la-Lys and Senlis to seek adjournments, which was granted at Aire but not Senlis. He refused to attend the hearings in Senlis and was excommunicated.

William returned to Andres after his failure at Senlis before setting out for the papal court again. He joined it at Ferentino and followed it to Rome, where Innocent lifted his excommunication but quashed his election as abbot and sent his case to a panel of papal judges delegate (Note: One of the three judges was Richard Poore.) in Paris. William went to Paris, where a majority of the judges found against him. He then went to Rome to appeal. Innocent issued a final decision confirming Andres's right to elect its abbot and sent William to Charroux with a copy. From there William returned to Andres and was again elected abbot. This required a return to Charroux for confirmation and thence a trip to Thérouanne for the bishop's benediction.

During his 23 years as abbot, William served several times as a papal judge delegate. He made a further trip to Rome as a representative of the general chapter of the Benedictines of the ecclesiastical province of Reims. He began writing his chronicle between 1220 and 1225. He was still working on it just months before his death. It is a long work, running to over 400 pages in a modern translation.

== Chronicle ==
=== Sources ===
The Chronicon Andrense functions as both a cartulary (collection of charters) and a chronicle (chronological narrative) of Andres. In this format—the cartulary-chronicle—"the charters of the monastery were copied in a more or less chronological order and then woven together with a narrative that provided their historical context." Only one of the charter used by William, redacted in the chronicle, survives outside of it. As a consequence, it is impossible to know how complete or accurate William's copies are. The charters mostly concern local matters. The families of the lords of Fiennes, Campagne-lès-Guines and Hames-Boucres are prominent as local patrons.

According to the introduction, William reworked the third book of Andrew of Marchienne's Historia succincta de gestis et successione regum Francorum, a history of the kings of France, by adding material on Andres and interspersing its charters. He also made use of Andrew's Auctarium Aquicinense, a continuation of the chronicle of Sigebert of Gembloux made at the abbey of Anchin. The result of the use of these compilations is a monastic history that is considerably more broad than is typical. For many events William is a primary source, either as eyewitness or by recording what he had heard from eyewitnesses. William mentions himself several times in the third person, but his description of the four-year legal case he led is in the first person.

=== Manuscript and publication history ===
The Chronicon is known from three complete and one partial manuscript. The complete copies are Brussels, KBR, MS 7655–57; Paris, BnF, MS lat. 12897; and Amiens, BAM, MS 496. The partial manuscript, a copy of the Amiens text, is Arras, Bibliothèque municipale, MS 155. It is partial because the scribe stopped copying when he realized the text had already been printed. All the manuscripts are from the 17th and 18th centuries. The Amiens manuscript was made from William's autograph, which was last known to be in the possession of the Jesuit college at Bergues. William's chronicle, possibly the autograph, was used by John of Ypres (died 1383) for his chronicle of Saint-Bertin.

Three abridged editions of the Latin text have appeared in print. Raphaël de Beauchamps published one based on the Amiens manuscript in 1633, presenting it as a continuation of the Historia succincta, and Luc d'Achery published another based on the Paris manuscript in 1723. In 1879, Johann Heller published an edition without the charters based on the Amiens and Brussels manuscripts for the Monumenta Germaniae Historica. A full edition including the charters based on all three independent manuscripts was made by Leah Shopkow, to be published by Brepols. Her English translation was published in 2017.
