= Gebhard I of Plain =

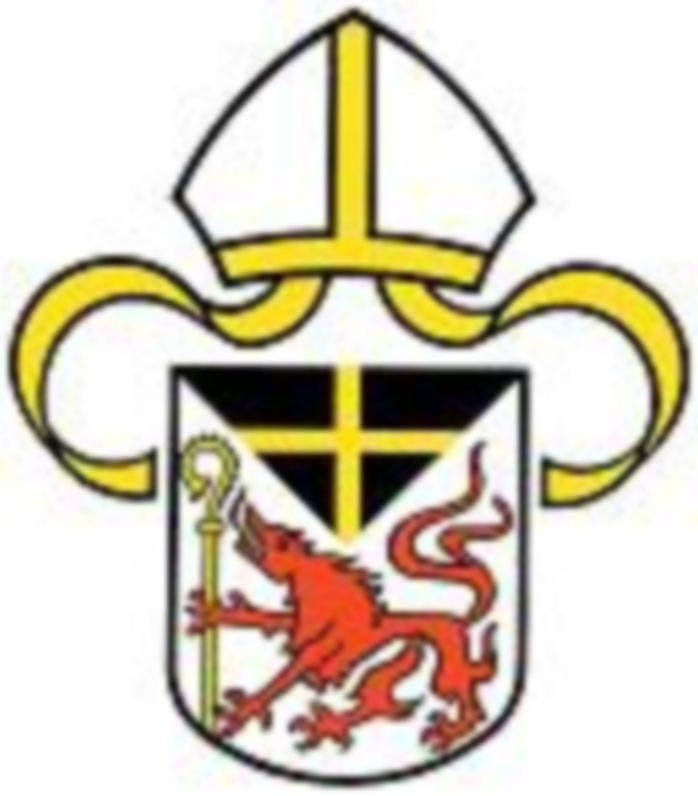
Bistumswappen of Passau.

Gebhard I. von Plain (Pleyen) (* 1170; † 11. October 1232 in Rome) was von 1222 till 1232 Bishop of Passau.

== Biography ==
Gebhard was born in 1170 as the second son of Count Liutpold of Plain-Hardegg and Countess Utta of Burghausen. On 18 June 1210 he received the parish of Grafenwörth as Passau's canon.

In March 1222 he was elected bishop of Passau, his kinship with the Staufern plays a large role in the election. He pursued an energetic parish policy, which also led to violent conflicts with monasteries striving for independence from the bishop.

On 17 March 1225 Gebhard passed the first Passauer Stadtrecht. In the same year, he built the town council house opposite the town hall (today the "Hotel zum Wilden Mann") and integrated the "Örtl" at the confluence of the Danube and the Inn into the city.

The great clerical and monastic visits, ordered by Pope Gregory IX. Led Gebhard in 1229 very conscientiously and excommunicated some 40 abbots, and priests of his diocese. This led to conflicts with the cathedral chapter. Even the murder of Duke Eberhard von Jahenstorf on 6 May 1231 was subsequently charged to Gebhard, although Passau citizens were also suspected. In 1232 Pope and Emperor were in dispute, and Gebhard was on the papal side, but the cathedral chapter sympathized with the Emperor. The dispute between the bishop and the chapter of the cathedral continued to exacerbate, which ultimately led to the resignation of Gebhard. He left Passau and went to Rome, where he died on 11 November 1232.
