= Tommaso degli Stefani =

Italian painter

Tommaso degli Stefani (1231–1310) was an Italian artist, working in Naples.

== Life ==
Dominici, in his Lives of the Neapolitan Painters, attempts to prove that the art was practised at Naples by this master before the time of Cimabue, and that it had, at that early period, reached a more improved state at Naples than it had at Florence. Whatever may be allowed for the partiality with which the Italian writers speak of their particular countrymen, Dominici appears to have established the authenticity of his statement. This venerable artist was born at Naples in 1231. He grounded himself upon the remains of Grecian art which had been preserved in the temples and public edifices at Naples, and had painted several pictures for the churches of San Francesco and Santa Maria delle Grazie previous to the year 1260, at which time he was employed by the Archbishop of Naples to ornament the chapel of his palace. Several other works by him are particularly described by Dominici. He died in 1310. He had a brother, Pietro degli Stefani, who also was a painter, but was more celebrated as a sculptor.
