= Rachel suum videns =

1234 Papal bull by Pope Gregory IX

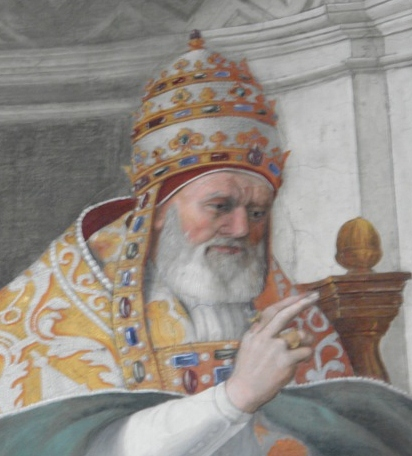
Pope Gregory IX

Rachel suum videns is a papal bull issued by Pope Gregory IX on 17 November 1234 calling for a crusade to the Holy Land and ordering Dominicans and Franciscans to preach in favour of it. It was issued before the truce between Frederick II, Holy Roman Emperor and the Egyptian Sultan, Al-Kamil, was due to expire. It was the key driver of recruitment for the Barons' Crusade.
