= Matthew FitzHerbert =

English nobleman and Sheriff of Sussex

Sheriff of Sussex
- In office 1211–1215

Sheriff of Sussex
- In office 1218–1228

Personal details
- Died: 1231
- Spouse: Joan de Mandeville
- Parent(s): Herbert FitzHerbert; Lucy of Hereford

Matthew FitzHerbert, (died 1231) Lord of Erlestoke and Stokenham, was an English nobleman and Sheriff of Sussex. FitzHerbert was one of the Counsellors named in Magna Carta in 1215. He was the son of Herbert FitzHerbert and Lucy de Hereford. His elder brother was Peter FitzHerbert.

Matthew was appointed Sheriff of Sussex by King John of England and also served during the reign of King Henry III of England. He lost his lordship of Ollonde, Normandy in 1204, after the French annexation of Normandy. FitzHerbert is listed as one of the Counsellors named in Magna Carta in 1215.

== Marriage and issue ==
Matthew married Joan, daughter of William de Mandeville and Mabilia Patric, they had the following known issue:

- Herbert FitzMatthew, died 1245, without issue, succeeded by his brother Peter.
- Peter FitzMatthew, died 1255, without issue, succeeded by his brother John.
- John FitzMatthew, married Margaret de Berkeley, had issue.
