= Conrad of Ascoli =

Blessed Conrad of Ascoli
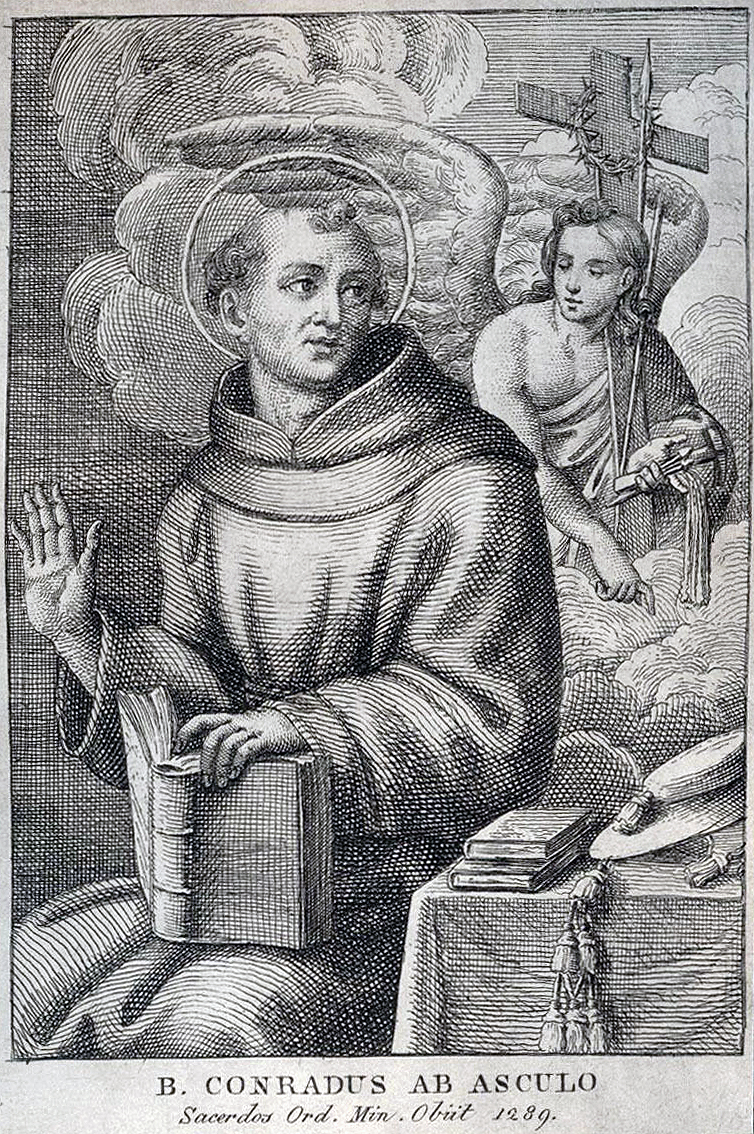
- Born: 1234; Ascoli, Italy
- Died: 19 April 1289; Ascoli, Italy
- Venerated in: Roman Catholicism
- Feast: April 19

Conrad of Ascoli was an Italian Friar Minor and missionary; his feast day is April 19.

== Biography ==
Conrad was born at Ascoli in the March of Ancona in 1234. He belonged to the noble family of Miliani and from his earliest years made penance the predominating element of his life. He entered the Order of Friars Minor at Ascoli together with his townsman and lifelong friend, Girolamo d'Ascoli, afterwards minister general, and later pope under the title of Nicholas IV. Later together they went to the cloister in Assisi to complete their training in the religious life and then to Perugia to continue their education. Conrad received a doctor's degree in theology and was sent to Rome to teach. Conrad had a great devotion to the Holy Trinity.

In 1274 he obtained permission to go to Africa, where he preached throughout the different provinces of Libya. Noted for his austerities, he was recalled from Africa, probably for reasons of health, to accompany his friend Girolamo, now papal legate, on a mission to the King of France, then at war with Spain. Conrad subsequently became lector of theology at Paris. When not engaged in teaching, Conrad preached to the people or ministered to the sick in hospitals.

In 1288 he was summoned to Rome by the new pope, Nicholas IV, who wished to make him cardinal, but Conrad died on the way after reaching his native city on 19 April 1289, being then fifty-five years of age.

== Veneration ==
Nicholas IV was deeply grieved because of the loss of his saintly friend, and declared that Conrad's death was a great loss to the Catholic Church. The people of Ascoli built a tomb over the remains of Conrad.

In 1371 his body was removed to the new church of the Franciscans. But it was found incorrupt and gave forth a sweet odour. Pius VI approved the cultus of Blessed Conrad.

His liturgical feast is kept in the Order of Friars Minor on 19 April.
