= Ou Shizi =

Ou Shizi (Chinese: 區適子; pinyin: Ōu Shìzǐ; Wade–Giles: Ou Shih-tzu; 1234–1324) was a Song dynasty scholar. A native of Chencun, Shunde, in Guangdong province, he was known as "Mr. Dengzhou" (登洲先生) and was famous for his learnedness. His native village was renamed Dengzhou in his honour. He is the attributed author of the Three Character Classic, a Chinese classic text that embodied Confucius thought yet suitable for teaching young children.
