= Minamoto no Ienaga =

Minamoto no Ienaga (源家長, Minamoto no Ienaga, c. 1170 – 1234) was a waka poet and Japanese nobleman active in the early Kamakura period. He is designated as a member of the New Thirty-Six Immortals of Poetry (新三十六歌仙, Shinsanjūrokkasen).
