= Zhang Yuansu =

Chinese physician

Zhang Yuansu 张元素 (courtesy name Jiegu; ca. 1151–1234) was one of the most historically influential Traditional Chinese medicine physicians in the period of transition from China's northern Jin dynasty to the Mongolian Yuan dynasty.

Zhang Jiegu integrated medicinal materials into the five element framework (Wuxing) with both the five shen herbs (spirit herbs) framework and qi meridians. He helped to more clearly define the association of the "tastes" of medicinals and their believed effect on the different organ systems. Zhang asserted that herbs entered into and influenced the meridians. The culmination of Zhang's work was a book called Bag of Pearls (Zhenzhu Nang 珍珠囊).

According to Zhang Jiegu:

"The method of appropriately using herbs in accordance with the symptom and sign presentation of the patient entails determining substances with the correct qi, taste, yin and yang, and thick and thin properties as well as the pathogenic factor involved and the meridian it has entered."

— Zhang Jiegu
