= Pacificus =

Pacificus was a disciple of St. Francis of Assisi, born probably near Ascoli, Italy, in the second half of the twelfth century; died, it is thought, at Lens, France, around 1234. He is said to be a favorite friend of St. Francis and believed to have retouched some of St. Francis words to refine the poetic composition and to set it into music. He was tasked by St. Francis to teach the Canticle to his gifted companions and how to communicate in the manner of "jesterly communication". He is thought to have composed the earliest extant poem in vernacular Italian in his ode to the Emperor Henry VI.

== Poet Laureate- Rex versuum- King of Verses ==
At an earlier time, his earlier life and identification was unsure, but what was sure was that he was called the King of Verses ("Rex versuum"). Local authors identify him with a certain William of Lisciano, who joined the court of Henry VI, Holy Roman Emperor. Before becoming Friar Minor (Franciscan) he had been poet laureate at the Court of Frederick II, Holy Roman Emperor.

St. Francis encouraged Brother Pacificus to use his art in the service of God. he asked him to improvise on his Canticles and set them into rhythm.

Around 1212 St. Francis preached at San Severino, in the Marches; the poet had a vision of two resplendent swords crossed on the saint's breast. He was deeply impressed by this vision. Later, he also saw the multicolored Tau, a symbol of the cross, on the forehead of St. Francis.

In a preface to a book by Cardinal Cantalamessa about St. Francis, Pope Francis wrote, "When Brother Pacificus, then known as William of Lisciano, met St. Francis, he saw the splendor of his holiness and through him saw the beauty of God's face. That which he always sought, he finally found and found thanks to a holy man." William asked to be received into the new order. St. Francis gladly complied, giving him the name of "Pacificus".

== The Vision at San Pietro in Bovara ==
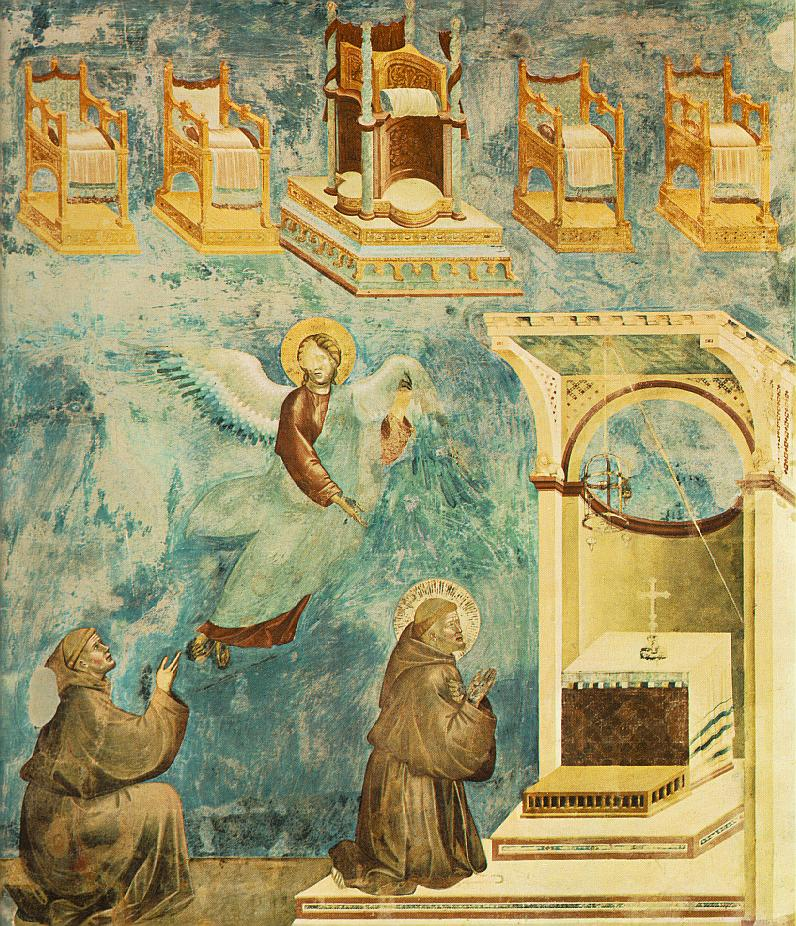

In the Speculum perfectionis, attributed to Brother Leo, Pacificus is said to have experienced a vision at San Pietro in Bovara of Francis in heaven. As he was praying in the abandoned church, St. Francis experienced "diabolical suggestions" and had had to come out and pray before it stopped. In the morning, when Brother Pacificus returned from being ordered to stay the night at a leper hospital, he saw St. Francis being raised to heaven and heard that the seat once occupied by the prideful Lucifer before the Fall was to be taken up by the humble Francis.

== Singing for Peace ==
While at San Damiano, Brother Pacificus was sent out to preach along with the other brothers, most likely as leader of the "Lord's Jesters", a group of singing friars. When a quarrel erupted between the local bishop and the municipality, Brother Pacificus and his singing band of brothers were summoned and was able to bring peace thru their singing.

== Introduced Friars Minor into France ==
St. Francis himself wanted to bring the order to France, his plans were interrupted. Francis summoned Brother Pacificus and sent him, with other friars, to France, this being a part of a pattern wherein he has sent brothers into the different parts of the world top preach the word of God. In 1217 he was sent to France, settling first at St. Denis, where he is said to have become the founder, and first provincial, of the Friars Minor.

In the Spring of 1226 Pacificus witnessed the holy "Stigmata of St. Francis". The last certain date in the life of Brother Pacificus is that of the papal bull, 12 August 1227, in which Pope Gregory IX recommends the Poor Clares of Siena to Pacificus' care. Cf "Magna sicut dicitur", 1227 (Bullarium Franciscanum volume I, 33–34)

== Return to France ==
Pacificus was sent back to France, where he later died.

It has long been mooted that Pacificus' poetic abilities were put to use turning Saint Francis' songs into verse, however there is no evidence to support this.
