= 1200s (decade) =

Decade

The 1200s began on January 1, 1200, and ended on December 31, 1209.

== Births ==
1200

- January 19 – Dōgen Zenji, founder of the Sōtō Zen school (d. 1253)
- January – Theobald le Botiller, Norman nobleman and knight (d. 1230)
- September – Philip I, French prince and nobleman (House of Capet) (d. 1235)
- October 9 – Isabel Marshal, English countess and regent (d. 1240)
- October 22 – Louis IV (the Saint), landgrave of Thuringia (d. 1227)
- unknown dates
- Alix (or Alis), Breton noblewoman (House of Thouars) (d. 1221)
- Ingerd Jakobsdatter, Danish noblewoman and landowner (d. 1258)
- Ulrich von Liechtenstein, German minnesinger and poet (d. 1275)
- probable
  - Adam Marsh, English Franciscan scholar and theologian (d. 1259)
  - Chen Rong (Ch'en Jung), Chinese painter and politician (d. 1266)
  - Jutta of Kulmsee, German noblewoman, hermit and saint (d. 1260)
  - Matthew Paris, English Benedictine monk and chronicler (d. 1259)
  - Rolandino of Padua, Italian professor, jurist and writer (d. 1276)
  - Rudolf von Ems, German nobleman, knight and poet (d. 1254)

1201

- February 18 – Nasir al-Din al-Tusi, Persian scientist and writer (d. 1274)
- May 30 – Theobald I of Navarre ("the Troubadour"), French-born nobleman (d. 1253)
- August 9 – Arnold Fitz Thedmar, English chronicler and writer (d. 1274)
- October 9 – Robert de Sorbon, French monk and theologian (d. 1274)
- October 10 – Richard de Fournival, French philosopher (d. 1260)
- Agnes of the Palatinate, duchess of Bavaria (House of Guelf) (d. 1267)
- Danylo Romanovych, ruler (knyaz) of Galicia–Volhynia (d. 1264)
- Diana degli Andalò (or d'Andalo), Italian nun and saint (d. 1236)
- Eison, Japanese Buddhist scholar-monk and disciple (d. 1290)
- Thomas of Cantimpré, Flemish priest and preacher (d. 1272)
- Uriyangkhadai, Mongol general and son of Subutai (d. 1272)

1202

- February/March – Kunigunde of Hohenstaufen, queen of Bohemia (d. 1248)
- July – Boniface II ("the Giant"), king of Thessalonica (d. 1253)
- November 1 – Enni, Japanese Buddhist monk and teacher (d. 1280)
- Alfonso of Molina, prince of León and Castile (d. 1272)
- Margaret of Constantinople, countess of Flanders (d. 1280)
- Matilda II of Boulogne, queen consort of Portugal (d. 1259)
- Mōri Suemitsu, Japanese nobleman and samurai (d. 1247)
- Shi Tianze, Chinese general and prime minister (d. 1275)
- Approximate date – Qin Jiushao, Chinese mathematician and writer (d. 1261)

1203

- January 10 – Abu Shama, Arab historian and writer (d. 1267)
- Abu Zakariya Yahya, ruler of the Hafsid Sultanate (d. 1249)
- Bi Bi Monajemeh Nishaburi, Persian astronomer (d. 1280)
- Cecilia Cesarini, Italian Dominican nun and saint (d. 1290)
- Donnchadh, Scottish ruler (mormaer) of Mar (d. 1244)
- Eva Marshal, Cambro-Norman noblewoman (d. 1246)
- Hamuro Mitsutoshi, Japanese waka poet (d. 1276)
- Hōjō Tokiuji, Japanese nobleman and spy (d. 1230)
- Ibn Abi Usaybi'a, Syrian physician and historian (d. 1270)
- Kujō Motoie, Japanese nobleman and poet (d. 1280)
- Mindaugas (or Mendog), king of Lithuania (d. 1263)
- Peter II ("the Little Charlemagne"), count of Savoy (d. 1268)
- Sengaku, Japanese Buddhist monk and writer (d. 1273)
- Vasilko Romanovich, Grand Prince of Kiev (d. 1269)
- Xueting Fuyu, Chinese Zen Buddhist abbot (d. 1275)
- Zakariya al-Qazwini, Persian astronomer (d. 1283)

1204

- April 14 – Henry I, king of Castile (d. 1217)
- Haakon IV of Norway (d. 1263)
- Henry Raspe, Landgrave of Thuringia (d. 1247)
- Maria of Courtenay, Empress regent of Nicaea (d. 1228)
- Alice of Schaerbeek (d. 1250)

1205

- January 26 – Emperor Lizong of Song (or Zhao Yun), Chinese emperor (d. 1264)
- March (or May) – Elisabeth of Swabia, queen of Castile and León (d. 1235)
- July 10 – Hōjō Masamura, Japanese nobleman (d. 1273)
- November 5 – As-Salih Ayyub, Ayyubid ruler (d. 1249)
- unknown dates
  - Bruno von Schauenburg, Bohemian bishop (d. 1281)
  - Wenceslaus I ("the One-Eyed"), king of Bohemia (d. 1253)
- probable
  - Azzo VII d'Este, Italian nobleman and knight (d. 1264)
  - Batu Khan, Mongol ruler of the Golden Horde (d. 1255)
  - Walter IV ("the Great"), French nobleman (d. 1246)

1206

- c.March 19 – Güyük Khan (or Kuyuk), Mongol emperor (d. 1248)
- April 7 – Otto II, German nobleman (d. 1253)
- unknown dates
  - Béla IV, king of Hungary and Croatia (d. 1270)
  - Hong Pok-wŏn, Korean general and official (d. 1258)
  - Yaghmurasen ibn Zyan, Zayyanid ruler (d. 1283)
- approximate dates
  - Margaret de Quincy, English noblewoman (d. 1266)
  - Sheikh Edebali, Ottoman religious leader (d. 1326)

1207

- July 7 – Elizabeth of Hungary, Hungarian princess (d. 1231)
- August 13 – Malik ibn al-Murahhal, Moroccan poet (d. 1299)
- September 30 – Rumi, Persian scholar and mystic (d. 1273)
- October 1 – Henry III (of Winchester), English king (d. 1272)
- Adelasia of Torres, Italian noblewoman and judge (d. 1259)
- Canute (or Knud Valdemarsen), duke of Estonia (d. 1260)
- Elen ferch Llywelyn (the Elder), Welsh princess, countess in England (d. 1253)
- Fujiwara no Akiuji, Japanese nobleman and poet (d. 1274)
- Fujiwara no Ariko, Japanese empress consort (d. 1286)
- Gilbert Marshal, English nobleman and knight (d. 1241)
- Henry II, Duke of Brabant, Dutch nobleman (House of Reginar) (d. 1248)
- Jakuen, Japanese Buddhist monk and scholar (d. 1299)
- John of Scotland, Scottish nobleman and knight (d. 1237)
- Margaret of Louvain, Flemish servant and saint (d. 1237)
- Ottone Visconti, Italian nobleman and archbishop (d. 1295)
- Philip I, Count of Savoy, French nobleman (d. 1285)
- Raymond II Trencavel (or Raimond), French nobleman (d. 1263)
- Sadr al-Din al-Qunawi, Persian philosopher (d. 1274)
- Vladislaus II, Bohemian nobleman and knight (d. 1227)

1208

- February 2 – James I ("the Conqueror"), king of Aragon (d. 1276)
- Ada van Holland, Dutch noblewoman and abbess (d. 1258)
- Berke Khan, Mongol ruler of the Golden Horde (d. 1266)
- Bolesław I of Masovia, Polish nobleman and knight (d. 1248)
- Coloman of Galicia, Hungarian prince of Halych (d. 1241)
- Gissur Þorvaldsson, Icelandic chieftain (or goði) (d. 1268)
- Kolbeinn ungi Arnórsson, Icelandic chieftain (d. 1245)
- Knut Haakonsson, Norwegian nobleman (jarl) (d. 1261)
- Margaret Skulesdatter, queen consort of Norway (d. 1270)
- Sempad the Constable, Armenian nobleman (d. 1276)
- Simon de Montfort, 6th Earl of Leicester, English nobleman (d. 1265)
- Thomas de Beaumont, English nobleman (d. 1242)

1209

- January 5 – Richard of Cornwall, English nobleman (d. 1272)
- January 11 – Möngke Khan, Mongol emperor (khagan) (d. 1259)
- June 25 – Fujiwara no Shunshi, Japanese empress (d. 1233)
- September 8 – Sancho II ("the Pious"), king of Portugal (d. 1248)
- December 7 – Vasilko Konstantinovich, Kievan prince (d. 1238)
- Bettisia Gozzadini, Italian female scholar and jurist (d. 1261)
- Choe Hang, Korean general and dictator (d. 1257)
- Gilbert of Preston, English Chief Justice (d. 1274)
- Haji Bektash Veli, Persian philosopher (d. 1271)
- Princess Kuniko (or Hoshi), Japanese empress (d. 1283)
- Roger Bigod, 4th Earl of Norfolk, English nobleman and knight (d. 1270)
- Shang Ting, Chinese calligrapher and poet (d. 1288)
- Valdemar the Young, king of Denmark (d. 1231)
- Walter Marshal, 5th Earl of Pembroke, English nobleman and knight (possible date) (d. 1245)
- Xu Heng, Chinese official and philosopher (d. 1281)

== Deaths ==
1200

- January 13 – Otto I, German nobleman (House of Hohenstaufen)
- January 14 – Odo of Novara, Italian priest and saint (b. 1105)
- January 20 – Odo of Canterbury, English abbot and theologian
- February 6
  - Kajiwara Kagesue, Japanese nobleman (b. 1162)
  - Kajiwara Kagetoki, Japanese samurai and spy
- April 8 – Adalbert III (or Vojtěch), German archbishop (b. 1145)
- April 23 – Zhu Xi, Chinese historian and philosopher (b. 1130)
- May 25 – Nicholas I, German nobleman (House of Mecklenburg)
- July 16 – Li Fengniang (or Cixian), Chinese empress (b. 1144)
- July 26 – Raymond of Piacenza (the Palmer), Italian pilgrim
- September 19 – Alberic III of Dammartin, French nobleman
- September 17 – Guang Zong, Chinese emperor (b. 1147)
- September 24 – Heinrich Walpot, German Grand Master
- October 25 – Conrad of Wittelsbach, German archbishop
- November 16 – Hugh of Avalon, French monk and bishop
- December 12 – Lochlann of Galloway, Scottish nobleman
- December 14 – Han (or Gongshu), Chinese empress (b. 1165)
- Adachi Morinaga, Japanese Buddhist warrior monk (b. 1135)
- Benedicta Ebbesdotter of Hvide, queen of Sweden (or 1199)
- Gilbert Horal, Spanish Grand Master of the Knights Templar
- Inpumon'in no Tayū, Japanese noblewoman and poet (b. 1130)
- Joel ben Isaac ha-Levi, German rabbi and Tosafist (b. 1115)
- Liu Wansu, Chinese physician of the Jin Dynasty (b. 1110)
- Nicholas of Amiens, French theologian and writer (b. 1147)
- Nigel de Longchamps, English satirist (approximate date)
- Osbern of Gloucester, English lexicographical writer (b. 1123)
- William FitzRalph, English nobleman and knight (b. 1140)

1201

- March 1 – Shikishi, Japanese princess, poet and writer (b. 1149)
- March 21 – Absalon, Danish archbishop and statesman (b. 1128)
- March 22 – Jarosław of Opole, Polish duke and bishop (b. 1145)
- April – Bohemond III ("the Stammerer"), prince of Antioch (b. 1148)
- April 7 – Baha al-Din Qaraqush, Egyptian regent and architect
- May 24 – Theobald III, French nobleman and knight (b. 1179)
- June 16 – Ibn al-Jawzi, Arab historian and philologist (b. 1116)
- June 20 – Imad ad-Din al-Isfahani, Persian historian (b. 1125)
- July – Agnes of Merania, queen consort of King Philip II of France
- July 25 – Gruffydd ap Rhys II, Welsh prince of Deheubarth
- July 31 – John Komnenos the Fat, Byzantine nobleman
- August 20 – Gardolf of Hertbeke, bishop of Halberstadt
- September 5 – Constance, duchess of Brittany (b. 1161)
- December 7 or 8 – Bolesław I the Tall, Duke of Wroclaw, Polish nobleman and knight (b. 1127)
- unknown dates
  - Fulk of Neuilly (or Foulques), French priest and preacher
  - Guglielmo Grasso, Genoese merchant, pirate and admiral
  - Margaret of Huntingdon, Duchess of Brittany, Scottish princess (b. 1145)
  - Walchelin de Ferriers (or Walkelin), Anglo-Norman nobleman

1202

- January 9 – Birger Brosa, Swedish nobleman and knight
- January 12 – Fujiwara no Tashi, Japanese empress (b. 1140)
- March 9 – Sverre Sigurdsson (or Sverrir), king of Norway
- March 13 – Mieszko III the Old, duke of Poland (b. 1126)
- March 30 – Joachim of Fiore, Italian theologian (b. 1135)
- April 5 – Geoffrey III, Count of Perche (or Geoffrey IV), French nobleman and knight
- May 7 – Hamelin de Warenne, Norman nobleman (b. 1130)
- May 10 – Mu'adzam Shah of Kedah, Malaysian sultan
- June 16 – Aymer (or Adhemar), count of Angoulême
- July 7 – Roger de Beaumont, English chancellor and bishop in Scotland
- August 8 – Simon I, German nobleman and knight
- August 10 – Ulrich II, German nobleman and knight
- September 7 – William of the White Hands, French cardinal (b. 1135)
- November 12 – Canute VI, king of Denmark (b. 1163)
- December 3 – Conrad of Querfurt, German bishop
- Albert of Chiatina, Italian archpriest and saint (b. 1135)
- André de Chauvigny (or Andrew), French knight (b. 1150)
- Bernard of Fézensaguet, French nobleman (b. 1155)
- Blondel de Nesle (or Jean I), French trouvère (b. 1155)
- Eugenius of Palermo, Italian admiral and poet (b. 1130)
- Geoffroy de Donjon, French Grand Master and knight
- Hammad al-Harrani, Ayyubid scholar, poet and traveler
- Jakuren, Japanese Buddhist priest and poet (b. 1139)
- Kojijū, Japanese noblewoman and waka poet (b. 1121)
- Minamoto no Yoshishige, Japanese samurai (b. 1135)
- 1202/03 – Alain de Lille, French theologian and writer (b. c.1128)

1203

- January – Sayyida Zumurrud Khatun, umm al-walad (mother) of the Abbasid caliph
- January 12 – Martin of León, Spanish priest (b. 1130)
- January 21 – Agnes II, abbess of Quedlinburg in Saxony (b. 1139)
- March – Hedwig, margravine of Meissen (b. 1140)
- April 6 – William of Æbelholt, French churchman (b. 1125)
- May – Dafydd ab Owain Gwynedd, Welsh prince
- July 12 – Isabel de Warenne, English noblewoman
- July 21 – Harvey I of Léon, Breton nobleman (b. 1153)
- September 11 – Stephen of Tournai, French bishop (b. 1128)
- October 8
  - Hiki Yoshikazu, Japanese warrior and nobleman
  - Minamoto no Ichiman, Japanese nobleman (b. 1198)
- November 4 – Dirk VII, Dutch nobleman and knight
- November 30 – Abd al-Ghani al-Maqdisi, Arab scholar and jurist (b. 1146)
- unknown dates
  - 'Abdallah ibn Ghaniya, Almoravid ruler of Mallorca
  - Alexios Palaiologos, Byzantine heir apparent
  - Gille Críst, Scottish nobleman and knight
  - William de Stuteville, English nobleman
- probable
  - Eudokia Komnene, Byzantine noblewoman
  - Siraj al-Din al-Sajawandi, Persian scholar
  - Toghrul (or Wang Khan), Mongol leader

1204

- January 1 – King Haakon III of Norway
- January – Isaac II Angelos, Byzantine emperor
- February 8 – Alexios IV Angelos, Byzantine emperor
- April 1 – Eleanor of Aquitaine, Sovereign Duchess Regnant of Aquitaine, queen of France and England
- August 11 – King Guttorm of Norway
- August 14 – Minamoto no Yoriie, Japanese shōgun (b. 1182)
- September 30 or November 30 – Emeric, King of Hungary (b. 1174)
- c. October 21 – Robert de Beaumont, 4th Earl of Leicester, English nobleman
- November – Ban Kulin, ruler of Bosnia (b. 1163)
- December 12 (or December 13) – Maimonides, Spanish rabbi and philosopher (b. 1135)
- December 22 – Fujiwara no Shunzei, Japanese waka poet (b. 1114)
- date unknown – Suleiman II, Sultan of Rûm
- probable – Amalric of Bena, French theologian

1205

- January 2 – Baldwin II, Count of Guînes, French nobleman and knight
- April 1 – Aimery of Cyprus (or Amaury), king of Jerusalem
- April 5 – Isabella I, queen and regent of Jerusalem (b. 1172)
- April 14
  - Garnier de Traînel (or Traisnel), French bishop
  - Louis I, French nobleman and knight (b. 1172)
- May 7 – Ladislaus III, king of Hungary and Croatia (b. 1200)
- May/June – Enrico Dandolo (or Henry), doge of Venice (b. 1107)
- June 14 – Walter III, Count of Brienne (or Gautier), French nobleman
- June 19 – Roman Mstislavich, Kievan prince (b. 1152)
- July 4 – Otto II, Margrave of Brandenburg ("the Generous"), German nobleman
- July 10 – Hatakeyama Shigeyasu, Japanese samurai
- July 13 – Hubert Walter, archbishop of Canterbury
- August 8 – Savaric FitzGeldewin, English bishop
- unknown dates"
  - Alan IV ("the Young"), viscount of Rohan (b. 1166)
  - Alexios Aspietes, Byzantine governor and usurper
- probable – Baldwin I, emperor of the Latin Empire (b. 1172)

1206

- February 4 – Theobald Walter, Norman High Sheriff (b. 1165)
- March 5 – Thietmar of Minden (or Dietmar), German bishop
- April 5 – Ottaviano di Paoli, Italian cardinal-bishop and diplomat
- April 7 – Frederick I, German nobleman (House of Lorraine)
- April 16 – Kujō Yoshitsune, Japanese nobleman (b. 1169)
- April 23 – Suero Rodríguez, Spanish knight and Grand Master
- June 4 – Adela of Champagne, queen of France (b. 1140)
- unknown dates
  - Artaldus (or Arthaud), French priest and bishop (b. 1101)
  - Harald Maddadsson, Norwegian nobleman (b. 1134) 9
  - Huan Zong, Chinese emperor of Western Xia (b. 1177)
  - Ismail al-Jazari, Artuqid polymath and inventor (b. 1136)
  - Muhammad of Ghor, ruler of the Ghurid Empire (b. 1149)
  - William de Burgh, English nobleman (House of Burke)
  - Yang Wanli, Chinese politician and poet (b. 1127)

1207

- February 7 – Sambor I, duke of Pomerania (b. 1150)
- March 1 – Fernando Afonso, Portuguese Grand Master
- May 3 – Fujiwara no Kanezane, Japanese nobleman
- May 7 – Abdul Razzaq Gilani, Persian jurist (b. 1134)
- June 6 – Gerardo dei Tintori, Italian mystic (b. 1134)
- June 13 – Xie, Chinese empress consort (b. 1135)
- June 19 – Ubaldo Lanfranchi, Italian archbishop
- August 21 – Simon of Wells, bishop of Chichester
- September 4
  - Boniface I of Montferrat, Italian nobleman
  - Raimbaut de Vaqueiras, French troubadour
- October – Kaloyan, ruler (tsar) of the Bulgarian Empire
- October 3 – Xin Qiji, Chinese general and poet (b. 1140)
- November 3 – Hartwig II, German archbishop
- November 24 – Han Tuozhou, Chinese statesman (b. 1152)
- unknown date – Amalric of Bena, French theologian and mystic
- probable
  - Bona of Pisa, Italian nun and mystic (b. 1156)
  - David Soslan, Alanian prince and king consort

1208

- January 15 – Pierre de Castelnau, French priest (assassinated)
- January 28 – Julian of Cuenca, Spanish bishop (b. 1127)
- February 18 – Mark Ibn Kunbar, Egyptian Coptic priest
- April 22 – Philip of Poitou (or Poitiers), bishop of Durham
- June 21 – Philip of Swabia, king of Germany (b. 1177)
- August 27 – Irene Angelina, queen consort of Sicily and Germany
- August 29 – Dietrich von Kittlitz, bishop of Meissen
- October 6 – Geoffrey de Muschamp, bishop of Coventry
- November 9 – Sancha of Castile, queen consort of Aragon
- December 29 – Zhangzong of Jin, Chinese emperor (b. 1168)
- Bridget Haraldsdotter, queen consort of Sweden (approximate date)
- Ermengol VIII (or Armengol), count of Urgell (b. 1158)
- Kolbeinn Tumason, Icelandic chieftain and poet (b. 1173)
- Knut Birgersson, Swedish nobleman (jarl) and knight
- Leo Sgouros (or Sgurus), Byzantine governor and despot
- Peter of Angoulême, Latin bishop and patriarch of Antioch
- William IV of Forcalquier, French nobleman (b. 1130)
- Ya'qub ibn Ishaq al-Israili, Egyptian Jewish physician

1209

- January 10 – William of Donjeon, French archbishop (b. 1140)
- January 13 – Matilda of Saxony, German noblewoman (b. 1172)
- February 2 – Alfonso II, Count of Provence ("Berenguer"), Spanish nobleman and knight (b. 1180)
- March 7 – Otto VIII, count palatine of Bavaria (approximate date)
- April 2 – Elisabeth of Greater Poland, Duchess of Bohemia, Polish princess (b. 1152)
- May 16 – Ji Gong (or Daoji), Chinese Buddhist monk (b. 1130)
- September 12 – Fujiwara no Kinshi (Go-Shirakawa), Japanese empress (b. 1134)
- November 10 – Raymond Roger Trencavel, French nobleman (b. 1185)
- November 12 – Phillipe de Plessis, French Grand Master (b. 1165)
- Albrecht von Johansdorf, German minnesänger (approximate date)
- Arnold of Altena, German nobleman and knight (b. 1166)
- Berenguier de Palazol (or Palou), Spanish troubadour
- Gaucelm Faidit, French troubadour (approximate date)
- John of Hexham, English monk and chronicler (b. 1160)
- Margaret of Sweden, queen consort of Norway (b. 1155)
- Nizami Ganjavi, Persian mystic poet and writer (b. 1141)
- Petrus Riga, French priest and poet (approximate date)
- Rigord, French monk and chronicler (approximate date)
- Ruzbihan Baqli, Persian Sufi master and poet (b. 1128)
- Walter Map, English diplomat and historian (b. 1140)

== Events ==
=== 1200 ===
==== By place ====
====== Europe ======
- Spring – Boniface I, Marquis of Montferrat, sends envoys to Venice, Genoa and other city-states to negotiate a contract for transport to the Levant. Meanwhile, Boniface and various nobles are mustering an expeditionary army (mainly forces from France and the Holy Roman Empire) at Paris. On February 23, Baldwin IX, count of Flanders and his brother Henry of Flanders take the cross at Bruges (modern Belgium), and agree to take part in the Fourth Crusade called by Pope Innocent III (see 1199).
- May 22 – The Kings John of England and Philip II of France, sign a peace treaty at Le Goulet, an island in the middle of the Seine River, near Vernon in Normandy. The agreement recognizes John as overlord of most of the English owned lands in France, but John has to give Philip the lands of Norman Vexin and Évreux and a large sum of money (some 20,000 marks) – a "relief" payment for recognition of John's sovereignty of Brittany.
- August 25 – Eager to make peace with Aymer Taillefer, count of Angoulême, John marries 15-year-old Isabella of Angoulême at Bordeaux. In order to remarry, John needs to abandon his first wife, Isabella of Gloucester. John accomplishes this by arguing that he has failed to get the necessary papal dispensation to marry Isabella of Gloucester.
- The rebel leader Ivanko is captured and executed by the Byzantine general Alexios Palaiologos (son-in-law of Emperor Alexios III Angelos).

====== Britain ======
- November 22 – During a tour of the Midlands, John receives homage from William the Lion, king of Scotland, at Lincoln. William is looking to move into the areas of Northumberland, Cumberland, and Westmoreland. John on the other hand ensures that these areas are controlled by English nobles he can trust.

====== Levant ======
- February 17 – Al-Adil I, Ayyubid ruler of Damascus, Jerusalem, and parts of the Jazira takes control of Egypt, and is recognized as sultan of the Ayyubid Empire. During his reign, he promotes trade and good relations with the Crusader States. His son Al-Kamil becomes the effective ruler (viceroy) of Egypt.

====== Asia ======
- Temüjin (or Genghis Khan) manages to unite about half the feuding Mongol clans under his leadership. He delegates authority based on skill and loyalty, rather than tribal affiliation or family. The main rivals of the Mongol confederation are the Naimans to the west, the Merkits to the north, the Tanguts to the south and the Jin Dynasty (or Great Jin) to the east.

==== By topic ====
====== Education ======
- The University of Paris receives its charter, from Philip II. He issues a diploma "for the security of the scholars of Paris", which affirms that students are subject only to ecclesiastical jurisdiction.

=== 1201 ===
==== By place ====
====== Byzantine Empire ======
- July 31 – John Komnenos the Fat, a Byzantine aristocrat, attempts to usurp the imperial throne; he is proclaimed emperor and crowned by Patriarch John X Kamateros, at Constantinople. Meanwhile, Emperor Alexios III Angelos, who resides in the Palace of Blachernae, dispatches a small force under Alexios Palaiologos, Alexios' son-in-law, who is regarded as his heir-apparent. With support of the Varangian Guard, John is overthrown and decapitated by the end of the day. His head is displayed at the Forum of Constantine, while John's supporters are captured and tortured to extract the names of all the conspirators.
- Autumn – Prince Alexios Angelos, son of the deposed, blinded and imprisoned late Emperor Isaac II Angelos, escapes from Constantinople. He makes his way to Sicily and then Rome where he is turned away by Pope Innocent III. Next, Alexios travels to the court of his brother-in-law, Philip of Swabia, the King of Germany, who receives him well.

====== Europe ======
- Spring – A treaty is signed between the Crusade leaders and Venice. Doge Enrico Dandolo agrees to manufacture a fleet capable of transporting the Crusader army to the Levant, and to provide provisions for 33,500 men and 4,500 horses, for the price of 85,000 silver marks while Venice will also take half of whatever the expedition conquers. As part of this deal the Venetians will provide – at their own expense – sufficient ships to carry the Crusader forces, plus 50 galleys to defend it.
- May 24 – Count Theobald III of Champagne suddenly dies and is replaced by Boniface I, marquis of Montferrat, as leader of the Fourth Crusade. He travels to France, where he meets his chief colleagues at Soissons.
- Battle of Stellau: Count Adolf III of Holstein is defeated by the Danish army under King Canute VI. Adolf retreats with his forces to Hamburg, where he is besieged and later captured by Duke Valdemar of Schleswig.
- Northern Crusades: The town of Riga is chartered as a city by Albert of Buxhoeveden, bishop of Livonia, who has landed on the site with some 1,500 Crusaders earlier in the year.

====== British Isles ======
- July 11 – Llywelyn the Great pays homage to John, King of England after Llywelyn has added Eifionydd and Llŷn to his kingdom of Gwynedd in north Wales.
- King John puts an embargo on wheat exported to Flanders, in an attempt to force an allegiance between the states. He also puts a levy of a fifteenth on the value of cargo exported to France and disallows the export of wool to France without a special license. The levies are enforced in each port by at least six men – including one churchman and one knight. John affirms that judgments made by the court of Westminster are as valid as those made "before the king himself or his chief justice".

==== By topic ====
====== Religion ======
- March 25 – Constance, duchess of Brittany, founds Villeneuve Abbey and gives it a charter.
- April 10 – John, King of England, permits Jews to live freely in England and Normandy.
- Pope Innocent III recognizes Otto IV as the only legitimate ruler of the Holy Roman Empire, against his rival King, Philip of Swabia. In return, Otto promises to support the pope's interests in Italy.

=== 1202 ===
==== By place ====
====== Fourth Crusade ======
- April–May – The bulk of the Crusader army gathers at Venice, although with far smaller numbers than expected: about 12,000 men (4–5,000 knights and 8,000 soldiers) instead of 33,500 men. Several contingents decide to make their own way to the Holy Land by different routes. A Crusader fleet, sailing from Flanders, carrying supplies for the Counts Baldwin IX and his brother Henry of Flanders, winters in Marseille, but is slowed by adverse weather. Later it sails on to the Middle East, along with other contingents from southern France.
- Summer – The Crusader army, encamped on the island of San Niccolo di Lido, between the Venetian Lagoon and the Adriatic Sea, is threatened by Doge Enrico Dandolo to keep them interned unless full payment is made as agreed in 1201. As the Crusaders wait on the Lido for men to arrive, they also use up food supplies that Venice has agreed to supply. Dandolo faces a financial catastrophe, having halted Venice's commerce for a year to prepare the expedition. The Crusader lords can offer Dandolo only 51,000 silver marks.
- September 8 – Enrico Dandolo takes the cross and agrees to lead a Venetian force, which, in an outburst of Crusading enthusiasm, reaches some 21,000 men – the largest contingent of the Fourth Crusade. He proclaims the debts will be wiped if the Crusaders take the 'rebel' Dalmatian city of Zara (modern-day Zadar) which has pledged its loyalty to Emeric, king of Hungary and Croatia. The Zara proposal causes disquiet in the Crusader ranks and also upsets Pope Innocent III who threatens to excommunicate those who attack Zara.
- September – Byzantine Prince Alexios Angelos sends representatives from Verona to the Crusader leaders in Venice. He promises to submit the Greek Orthodox Church to papal obedience and to provide the Crusade with 200,000 silver marks, together with provisions for a year. Alexios also will contribute 10,000 mounted soldiers to the expedition. In return he wants the Crusade to overthrow his uncle, the Byzantine emperor Alexios III Angelos.
- November 10–24 – Siege of Zara: The Crusaders under Boniface of Montferrat besiege and conquer Zara (modern-day Zadar) in Dalmatia. Despite letters from Innocent III forbidding such an action, and threatening excommunication. The leading citizens of Zara hang banners of crosses along the outer walls, professing their Catholic faith. Nevertheless, the Crusaders breach and sack the city, killing many.
- Winter – Innocent III excommunicates the Crusader army, along with the Venetians, who winter at Zara. Many Crusaders, including some senior men, either abandon the Fourth Crusade or make their own way to the Holy Land. However, the majority remain in Zara, where the army receives some welcome reinforcements. During the winter, negotiations continue with Alexios Angelos.

====== Europe ======
- Spring – King Philip II of France ("Augustus") summons John, King of England ("Lackland") to Paris to answer his charges against the Lusignans. On April 28, failing to attend Philip's court, John is declared to be a 'rebel' and to have forfeited the areas of Aquitaine, Poitou and Anjou. Philip tries to mediate the political problems between John and the Lusignans (who are charged with treason) but this is ignored by John. The lands are given to Arthur of Brittany. Philip supports Arthur's claim to the English throne and betrothes his 4-year-old daughter Marie.
- August 1 – Battle of Mirebeau: Arthur of Brittany, supported by the Lusignans, lays siege to Mirebeau Castle trapping Eleanor of Aquitaine inside. John launches a rescue mission to free his mother, and with a mercenary army defeats the Breton-Lusignan forces. Arthur is captured by William de Braose and is handed over to John who imprisons him in the Château de Falaise in Normandy. Many other important knights are captured and shipped to England (where John treats them badly and keeps them as prisoners in dungeons).
- July 27 – Battle of Basian: Seljuk forces (some 150,000 men) under Suleiman II of Rûm advance toward the Georgian border and are met by a 65,000-strong army led by King David Soslan, husband of Queen Tamar of Georgia, at Basian. The Georgians assail the enemy's camp and in a pitched battle, the Seljuk forces are overwhelmed and defeated. The loss of the sultan's banner (while Suleiman himself is wounded), results in panic within the Seljuk ranks. The victory at Basian secures the Georgian preeminence in the region.
- The Livonian Brothers of the Sword is founded by Bishop Albert of Riga, this to support the Livonian Crusade against the inhabitants of Terra Mariana (medieval Livonia).
- Danish forces make a Crusade to Finland which is led by Anders Sunesen, archbishop of Lund, and his brother.
- The Almohad fleet expels the Banu Ghaniya from the Balearic Islands.

====== Middle East ======
- May 20 – An earthquake shakes the Levant from Egypt to northern Iraq, causing severe damage in Palestine, Lebanon and western Syria, including the fortifications of the Crusader cities of Acre, Jaffa and Tyre.

==== By topic ====
====== Religion ======
- Spring – Pope Innocent III reasserts his right to evaluate and crown the Holy Roman Emperor, in a letter to Berthold V, Duke of Zähringen.
- Rueda Abbey is founded by Cistercians at Sástago, in the Kingdom of Aragon (modern Spain).

=== 1203 ===
==== By place ====
====== Fourth Crusade ======
- April 20 – The Crusader army evacuates Zara (modern Zadar) and sets sail to Corfu; Boniface of Montferrat and Doge Enrico Dandolo stay behind to await Prince Alexios Angelos. After a brief pause at Durrës (modern Albania), the fleet reaches Corfu. Meanwhile, news of its approach (through spies) has reached Emperor Alexios III Angelos at Constantinople. He gives order to strengthen the city walls and the fortifications.
- May – June – The Crusader fleet rounds Greece and stops at Negroponte (modern-day Halkis), where the local authorities submit to Alexios Angelos. Encouraged by this, the Crusader leaders send him and several ships to extend his authority over the neighboring island of Andros. Mid-June, the Crusader fleet sails from Greece to Abydos, where it enters the Dardanelles.
- June 23 – The Crusader fleet comes within sight of Constantinople, and enters the Bosporus. The Byzantine capital is defended by a garrison of 15,000 soldiers (including 5,000 men of the Varangian Guard), and a fleet of 20 galleys. On June 26, the Byzantine troops skirmish with the Crusader forces, who attack, without success, the cities of Chalcedon and Chrysopolis.
- July 2 – Crusader leaders sail close to the city's walls in order to display the young Alexios Angelos, where they call upon the Byzantines to rise up in his favour. After rowing back and forth for a while, receiving insults and missiles, the attempt is abandoned. The Crusader leadership decides to land an invasion force north of Galata – using prevailing currents and winds.
- July 5 – The Crusader fleet disembarks their horse transports, and barrels down upon the Byzantine defenders in a full cavalry charge. The Byzantines flee after brief combat, and retreat to the Tower of Galata, where they fortify themselves. After a bitter struggle, the Crusaders capture the tower and break the floating chain, and allow their fleet to enter the Golden Horn.
- Siege of Constantinople: The Crusaders, led by Boniface of Montferrat, capture Constantinople, in support of the deposed Emperor Isaac II and his son Alexios Angelos. This marks the main outcome of the Fourth Crusade.
  - July 11 – The Crusaders take positions opposite the Palace of Blachernae on the northwest corner of the city. Their first attempts are repulsed, but on July 17 the Venetians take a section of the wall of about 25 towers, while the Varangian Guard holds off the Crusaders on the land wall, inflicting heavy casualties. The Venetians set fire to the buildings inside the Golden Horn walls, and then abandon the occupied fortifications.
  - July 17–18 – Alexios III tries to counterattack from the Gate of St. Romanus but retreats without a fight. Embarrassed, he prefers to escape and abandon his subjects, fleeing with the imperial treasure to Develtos (a fortified town on the Gulf of Burgas) in Thrace. Meanwhile, the Byzantine aristocracy restores the ex-emperor Isaac II to the imperial throne. On August 1, Alexios Angelos is crowned co-emperor as Alexios IV.
- August – Alexios IV announces new taxes and enrages the Orthodox Church by confiscating large quantities of Byzantine icons, many centuries old, and melts them down to produce enough silver to pay the massive debt to the Venetians. A riot breaks out in Constantinople – during which the Byzantine populace loots and burns the homes of Italian residents in the city.
- August 31 – The Venetians rally a rabble of soldiers and storm through the walls, attacking the Mitation Mosque which results in extensive fires in Constantinople. Finally, they are fought off by the Byzantines and Muslims standing side by side. It becomes one of the most extensive urban conflagrations in European History and renders some 100,000 people homeless.
- August–October – Alexios IV leads a Crusader expedition (some 6,000 men) to extend his central-government control, against the fugitive Alexios III in Thrace. Meanwhile, a Crusader fleet operates in the Sea of Marmara in support of the Thracian campaign. The Crusaders seize several towns, including Adrianople, while Alexios escapes and withdraws to Macedonia.

====== Europe ======
- Spring – King Philip II of France invades Normandy and attacks a number of castles in the surrounding region. In April, John, King of England loses the support of his French vassals who desert him. Philip enters Rouen, leading to the eventual Treaty of Paris (1259) and unification of Normandy and France.
- At Rouen, William de Braose, an English nobleman, becomes the guardian of the imprisoned 16-year-old Arthur of Brittany, designated heir to the throne of England – who is not known to be alive after April and is probably murdered by or at the orders of his uncle, King John.
- August – Siege of Château Gaillard: French forces under Philip II begin the siege at Château Gaillard as part of a campaign to reconquer the continental properties of King John of England. During the winter of 1203/1204, the English under William Marshal attempt to relieve the castle.
- October – Brothers' Quarrel: Emeric, King of Hungary captures his rebellious brother Duke Andrew without resistance following their third confrontation in recent years.
- December 6 – King John abandons the lands that have been held by the Dukes of Normandy for over a hundred years and returns to England. Only two castles hold out against the French forces – they are Chinon Castle, controlled by Hubert de Burgh and Loches Castle.
- The Oeselians ravage Danish Scania. The returning pirates later skirmish with the German settlers of Riga, near Visby in Gotland.

====== Levant ======
- Summer – On orders of Al-Adil I, sultan of Egypt, Muslim ships attack Crusader vessels off Cyprus. Ships from Acre retaliate this action, by capturing six Muslim ships off Acre. King Aimery of Jerusalem declares the truce void between Al-Aldil and the Crusaders, and raids Muslim territory in northern Palestine. Al-Adil responds by taking his army to the outskirts of Acre – but does not launch an assault and retires afterward. A plague breaks out in Acre and half the newly arrived Crusader army dies.

====== East Asia ======
- Early – Battle of Khalakhaljid Sands: Temüjin, khan of the Mongol tribe and the future Genghis Khan, is comprehensively defeated by the forces of Toghrul, khan of the Kereit.
- Midyear – The Baljuna Covenant, an oath of mutual fidelity, is sworn by Temüjin and a small group of companions.
- Late – In a 3-day battle at the Jeje'er Heights on the lower Kherlen River, Temüjin defeats the Kereit and Toghrul is killed.

====== Japan ======
- Minamoto no Sanetomo becomes the third shogun of the Kamakura Shogunate. During his reign, Sanetomo is a puppet ruler for his mother Hōjō Masako who uses him as a pawn in her war with her father Hōjō Tokimasa.

==== By topic ====
====== Economy ======
- First evidence that the Temple in London is extending loans to John, King of England. The sums remain small, but are often used for critical operations, such as the ransoming of the king's soldiers captured by the French.

====== Religion ======
- April 8 – Congress of Bilino Polje: Ban Kulin, ruler of Bosnia, officially declares his allegiance to the Roman Catholic Church and denounces heresy.
- Ragnall mac Somairle, a Scottish nobleman, invites Benedictine monks to establish the abbey of Iona.
- The Temple of Nataraja is completed, at Chidambaram in India.

=== 1204 ===
- January 27–28 – Byzantine emperor Alexios IV Angelos is overthrown in a revolution.
- February 5 – Alexios V Doukas is crowned Byzantine emperor.
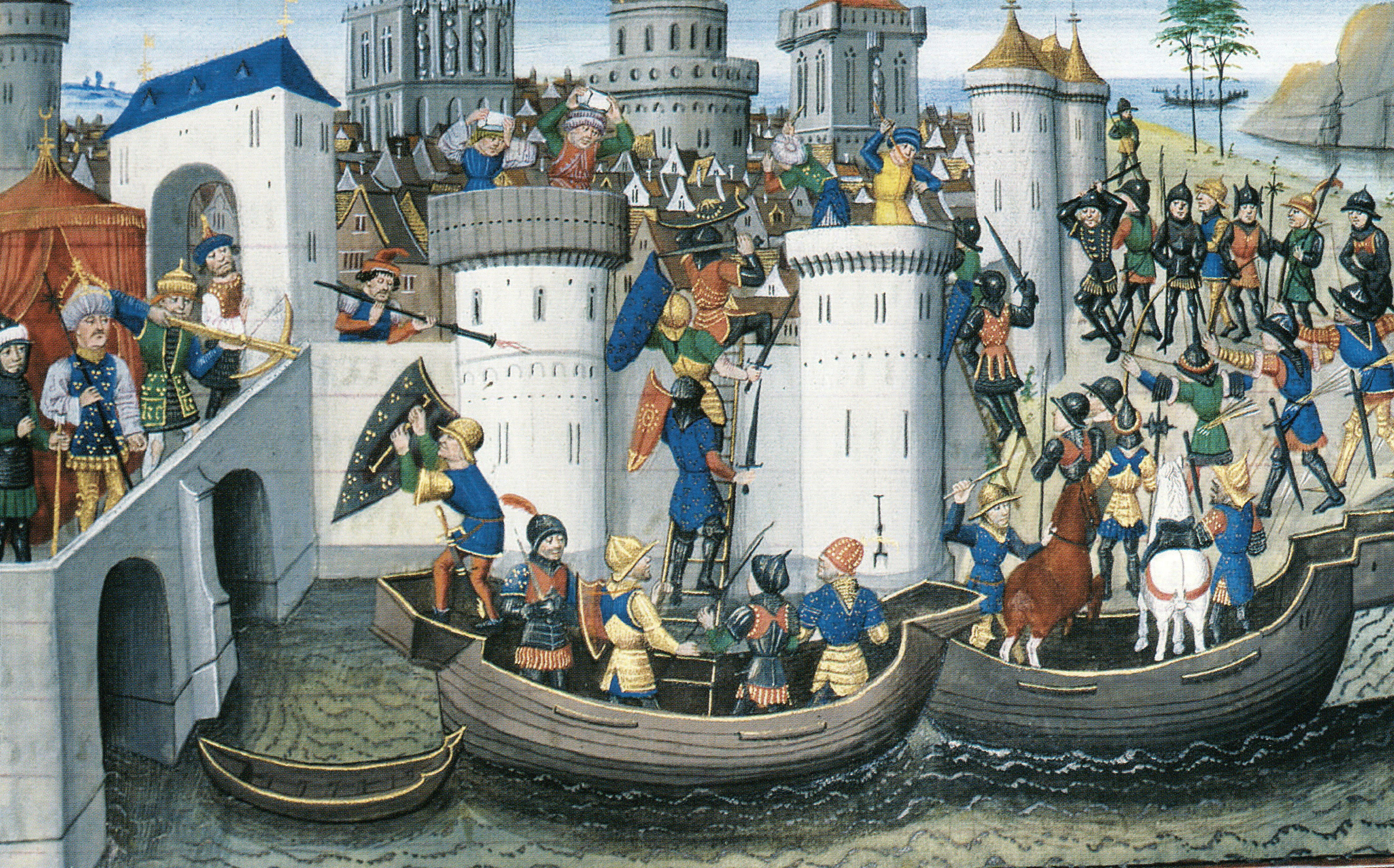
  Conquest of Constantinople by the Crusaders
- April 12 – Sack of Constantinople: Crusaders enter Constantinople by storm and start pillaging the city as part of the Fourth Crusade. Forces of the Republic of Venice seize the antique statues that will become the horses of Saint Mark.
- May 16 – Baldwin, Count of Flanders, is crowned emperor of the Latin Empire a week after his election by the members of the Fourth Crusade.
- Theodore I Laskaris flees to Nicaea after the capture of Constantinople, and establishes the Empire of Nicaea; Byzantine successor states are also established in Epirus and Trebizond.
- Boniface I, Marquis of Montferrat, a leader of the Fourth Crusade, founds the Kingdom of Thessalonica.
- The writings of French theologian Amalric of Bena are condemned by the University of Paris and Pope Innocent III.
- Tsar Kaloyan is recognized as king of Bulgaria by Pope Innocent III, after the creation of the Bulgarian Uniate church.
- Valdemar II of Denmark is recognized as king in Norway.
- Angers and Normandy are captured by Philip II of France.
- The Cistercian convent of Port-Royal-des-Champs is established.
- The district of Cham becomes subject to Bavaria.
- Hermann I, Landgrave of Thuringia submits to Philip of Swabia.
- Beaulieu Abbey is founded.
- The Channel Islands of Guernsey and Jersey decide, after a plebiscite of wealthy land owners, to remain with the English crown, after Normandy is recaptured by Philip II of France.

=== 1205 ===
==== By place ====
====== Byzantine Empire ======
- Spring – Theodore I Laskaris is proclaimed Byzantine emperor (or basileus), formally founding the Empire of Nicaea, after repelling the invasions of rivals David Komnenos and Manuel Maurozomes into his domains. His appointment is an open challenge to the legitimacy of the Latin emperor Baldwin I, who rules over large parts of the former Byzantine Empire and regards Theodore as a usurper.
- March 19 – Battle of Adramyttion: The Byzantine army, under Constantine Laskaris (brother of Theodore I), appears before the walls of Adramyttium – surprising the Latin garrison. Meanwhile, Henry of Flanders, not wanting to remain trapped within the city, opens the gates and charges out with his heavy cavalry. He and his knights defeat the Byzantine forces, who are scattered and forced to retreat.
- March – Byzantine officials in Adrianople revolt and expel Latin administrators, requesting Bulgarian support from Kaloyan, ruler (tsar) of the Bulgarian Empire, against Baldwin I who assembles an army (some 40,000 men) and marches to aid the Byzantines. Meanwhile, Baldwin sets out from Constantinople in force, he arrives at Adrianople and promptly begins to siege the city by the end of March.
- April 14 – Battle of Adrianople: Latin forces under Baldwin I are defeated and eliminated in a successful ambush by Bulgarians, Vlachs and Cumans. Baldwin is captured and taken as prisoner to Veliko Tarnovo – where he is locked up at the top of a tower in the Tsarevets fortress. Later, Baldwin is possibly executed by orders of Kaloyan (this according to the Byzantine historian George Akropolites).
- Summer – Battle of Koundouros: Byzantine forces (some 5,000 men) under Michael Doukas, governor of the Theme of the Peloponnese (and later Despot of Epirus), tries to stop the Latin army (some 700 knights and foot soldiers) at the Olive Grove of Koundouros. The Byzantines are defeated by William of Champlitte, who later founds the Principality of Achaea (a vassal state of the Latin Empire).
- Othon de la Roche, a Burgundian nobleman, founds the Duchy of Athens (one of the Crusader states set up in Greece) and takes the title of "Grand Lord" (Megaskyr) in Athens.

====== Europe ======
- January 6 – Philip of Swabia becomes King of the Romans and is crowned again with great ceremony at Aachen by Archbishop Adolf of Cologne. After several threats, Adolf is removed from office by Pope Innocent III and excommunicated, on July 19. Philip is able to increasingly assert his kingship against Otto of Brunswick (who is also crowned king of Germany) in the northern parts of the Alps.
- May 29 – Andrew II, brother of the late King Emeric, is crowned ruler of Hungary and Croatia at Székesfehérvár, after his 5-year-old nephew, Ladislaus III, suddenly dies in Vienna. Andrew introduces a new policy for royal grants, which he calls "new institutions". He distributes large portions of his domain–such as royal castles and all estates attached to them–to supporters and Hungarian nobles.
- June 19 – Battle of Zawichost: Polish forces under High Duke Leszek the White defeat the Kievan army at Zawichost. During the ambush, Roman Mstislavich, Grand Prince of Kiev, is killed. He is succeeded by his two infant sons, Daniel and Vasilko. Their principalities are ruled by their mother Anna of Byzantium, but the boyars of Galicia–Volhynia forces her and the young princes into exile.
- Summer – King Philip II ("Augustus") conquers most of the Angevin lands, including much of Aquitaine. Fearing a French invasion of England itself, John, King of England ("Lackland") requires every English male over 12 years to enter a mobilization "for the general defense of the realm and the preservation of peace". John prepares an expedition force of his own, but the barons refuse to cross the Channel.

====== England ======
- William of Wrotham, Lord Warden of the Stannaries, oversees a reform of English currency. In keeping with other high-ranking bureaucrats of his time, this is just one of Wrotham's many offices. He is also "keeper of ports", the forerunner of the First Lord of the Admiralty, supervisor of the mints of Canterbury and London, ward of the vacant Diocese of Bath and Wells and archdeacon of Taunton.

====== Levant ======
- April 1 – Aimery of Cyprus, king of Jerusalem, dies of food poisoning caused by white mullet. He is succeeded by his 9-year-old son Hugh I as ruler of Cyprus. His mother, Queen Isabella I becomes regent over the young boy, but she dies suddenly four days after her husband. The High Court of Cyprus appoints Walter of Montbéliard (brother-in-law of Aimery) as regent and Hugh's guardian.

====== Africa ======
- Caliph Muhammad al-Nasir establishes Almohad domination over the eastern parts of Ifriqiya (modern Tunisia). He appoints General Abu Mohammed ibn Abi Hafs as governor of Ifriqiya.

==== By topic ====
====== Religion ======
- July 15 – Pope Innocent III lays down the principle that Jews are doomed to perpetual servitude, because they had crucified Jesus.

=== 1206 ===
==== By place ====
====== Byzantine Empire ======
- January 31 – Battle of Rusion: The Bulgarian forces (some 7,000 men), under Tsar Kaloyan, defeat the remnants of the Latin army, near the fortress of Rusion in Thrace. Around 120 knights, supported by soldiers and cavalry, are killed in battle or captured.
- February – The Bulgarians attack and loot the fortified town of Rodosto (see Battle of Rodosto), defended by a Venetian garrison. Later, Kaloyan captures many more towns and fortresses.
- August 20 – Henry of Flanders is crowned as the second emperor of the Latin Empire, in the Hagia Sophia at Constantinople, after hearing of the death of his brother, Emperor Baldwin I, who has died in prison at Baldwin's Tower in Tsarevets Castle, in Veliko Tarnovo (after being captured by the Bulgarians in 1205). Upon Henry's ascension as Latin emperor, the Lombard nobles of the Kingdom of Thessalonica refuse to give him allegiance.

====== Asia ======
- Temüjin assembles at a Kurultai, a council of chiefs of the Mongol tribes under his rule, and is elected as their leader. He is given the title of Genghis Khan of the Mongol people – founding the Mongol Empire. Genghis takes immediate steps to underpin his military command, starting with a fundamental reordering of tribal loyalties. United under one nomadic nation, under one banner and one authority.
- Muqali (or Mukhali), a Mongol general in service of Genghis Khan, is rewarded with the command of the left-wing of the newly reorganized Mongol army and takes control over the eastern Mingghans.
- March 15 – Sultan Muhammad of Ghor is murdered and succeeded by Qutb al-Din Aibak, his deputy in India, who founds the Mamluk Dynasty, the first dynasty of the Delhi Sultanate.

====== Europe ======
- King Valdemar II ("the Conqueror") and Archbishop Andreas Sunonis raid Saaremaa Island (modern Estonia), forcing the islanders to submit. The Danes build a fortress, but finding no volunteers to man it, they burn it down themselves and leave the island.
- The Livonian Brothers of the Sword, in alliance with the Semigallians, conquer the Livonians (or Livs).

====== Britain ======
- June – John, King of England ("Lackland") lands an expeditionary army at La Rochelle to defend his interests in Aquitaine, which is his from the inheritance from his mother, Queen Eleanor of Aquitaine. Meanwhile, French forces led by King Philip II ("Augustus") move south to meet John. The year's campaign ends in a stalemate and a two-year truce is made between the two rulers.

==== By topic ====
====== Art and Culture ======
- Sugar, an import from the Muslim world, is mentioned for the first time in a royal English account. Almonds, cinnamon, ginger, and nutmeg are also imported for royal banquets.

====== Religion ======
- A peasant named Thurkhill in England claims that Saint Julian took him on a tour of Purgatory. Thurkhill includes realistic touches of descriptions of Purgatory's torture chambers. This is also believed by Roger of Wendover, one of his society's leading historians.
- December – The monks of Canterbury want their own sub-prior Reginald for the post of archbishop, while King John chooses John de Gray. Pope Innocent III appoints Stephen Langton. Finally, the monks accept the Pope's decision and vote for Langton.

====== Technology ======
- The Arab engineer Ismail al-Jazari describes many mechanical inventions in his book (title translated to English) The Book of Knowledge of Ingenious Mechanical Devices.

=== 1207 ===
==== By place ====
====== Byzantine Empire ======
- Spring – Siege of Attalia: Seljuk forces led by Sultan Kaykhusraw I besiege the city port of Attalia (modern-day Antalya) with siege machines. After a siege of more than 2 months, the city is captured, Kaykhusraw allows his forces 3 days of looting and slaughtering. The capture of the port gives the Seljuk Turks a major path into the Mediterranean.
- September 4 – Battle of Messinopolis: Latin forces under Boniface of Montferrat are ambushed and defeated at Messinopolis. Boniface is killed and his head is sent to Kaloyan, ruler (tsar) of the Bulgarian Empire. Seeking to take advantage of the situation, Kaloyan besieges Thessalonica. In October, he dies under mysterious circumstances.

====== Europe ======
- February 2 – Terra Mariana (or Medieval Livonia), comprising modern-day Estonia and Latvia, is established as a principality of the Holy Roman Empire. During its existence there is a constant struggle over supremacy between the lands ruled by the Teutonic Order, the secular German nobility, and the citizens of the Hanseatic towns of Riga and Reval.
- Prince Mstislav Mstislavich ("the Daring") clashes with his uncle Rurik Rostislavich, Grand Prince of Kiev, and is forced to surrender the town of Torchesk (a major centre of resistance against Polovtsian raids).
- Pope Innocent III declares for King Philip of Swabia as Holy Roman Emperor, a reversal of his previous support for Philip's rival Otto IV.

====== England ======
- John, King of England ("Lackland") introduces the first income tax. One-thirteenth of income from rents and moveable property has to be paid. Collected locally by sheriffs and administered by the Exchequer, the tax is unpopular with the English nobility and especially in the churches and monasteries, but does raise a lot of money for John, doubling his annual income for the year.
- May 24 – John still refuses to accept Stephen Langton as archbishop; Innocent III threatens to place England under an Interdict. In response, John confiscates church property. Many of the English bishops of the great churches in the country flee abroad to the Continent.
- November – Leeds, a market town in West Yorkshire, receives its first charter (approximate date).

====== Asia ======
- Jochi, eldest son of Genghis Khan, subjugates people of the Siberian forest (taiga); the Uriankhai, the Oirats, the Barga, the Khakas, the Buryats, and the Tuvans, extending the northern border of the Mongol Empire.
- Hōnen and his followers of the Pure Land sect are persecuted and exiled to remote parts of Japan, while a few are executed, for what the government considers heretical Buddhist teachings.
- In Vietnam, the Lý dynasty witnessed the political crisis under king Lý Cao Tông. The barbarians in Tản Viên mountain rebelled against the emperor. They continued to rule Tản Viên mountain independently until the beginning of the Trần dynasty. In March, two chieftains Đoàn Thượng, Đoàn Chủ in Hồng Châu (present day Hải Dương and Hải Phòng) rebelled and declared themselves kings. Their rebellions lasted for 2 years, contributing to the fall of the Ly dynasty.
- Before 1207 – Kosho writes Kuya Preaching, during the Kamakura period (it is later kept at Rokuharamitsu-ji Temple in Kyoto).
- October 7 – The Indramayu Regency in Nusantara is established.

==== By topic ====
====== Economy ======
- The first documentary evidence of forced loans in Venice. This technique becomes the staple of public finance in Europe, until the 16th century.

====== Religion ======
- June 17 – Stephen Langton is consecrated as archbishop of Canterbury in England by Innocent III at Viterbo.

=== 1208 ===
==== By place ====
====== Asia ======
- April 15 – A fire breaks out in the Song Chinese capital city of Hangzhou, raging for four days and nights, destroying 58,097 houses over an area of more than 3 miles (4.8 km), killing 59 people, and an unrecorded number of other people, who are trampled while attempting to flee. The government provides temporary lodging for 5,345 people, in nearby Buddhist and Taoist monasteries. The collective victims of the disaster are given 160,000 strings of cash, along with 400 tons of rice. Some of the government officials who lose their homes take up residence in rented boathouses on the nearby West Lake.

====== Europe ======
- January 15 – Pierre de Castelnau is murdered by heretics supported by Raymond VI, count of Toulouse. He is held responsible and excommunicated by Pope Innocent III, leading to the Albigensian Crusade.
- January 31 – Battle of Lena: Swedish forces under King Eric X defeat the invading Danish army (some 12,000 men). King Sverker II ("the Younger") is deposed as king of Sweden and is succeeded by Eric X.
- Livonian Crusade: The Crusader Livonian Brothers of the Sword, supported by tribes of Livs and Letts, initiate raids into Ugandi County in southern Estonia, resulting in the Estonian fight for independence.
- March 24 – Innocent III places England under a Papal Interdict, as punishment for John, King of England ("Lackland")'s refusal to accept Stephen Langton as archbishop of Canterbury. During the interdict, religious services as marriages, burials, or baptisms cannot be performed. John confiscates church property of clergy who are unwilling to conduct services. Many bishops in the country flee abroad to the Continent.
- Autumn – William Marshal is recalled and humiliated by King John at court in London, while John gives his justiciar in Ireland, Meiler Fitzhenry the order to invade Marshal's lands there, burning the town of New Ross.
- June 21 – Philip of Swabia, king of Germany, is assassinated in Bamberg by the German count Otto of Wittelsbach, because Philip has refused to give him his 10-year-old daughter Beatrice in marriage.
- June 30 – Battle of Philippopolis: Bulgarian forces under Emperor (tsar) Boril are defeated by the Latin army (some 30,000 men) led by Emperor Henry of Flanders, near modern-day Plovdiv, Bulgaria.
- August 27 – Queen Irene Angelina dies in childbirth after the death of her husband Philip of Swabia at Hohenstaufen Castle, leaving four daughters: Beatrice, Maria, Kunigunde and Elisabeth.
- November 11 – Otto IV is elected by the German nobles as king of Germany at Frankfurt. He is engaged to Beatrice and travels to Milan where he receives the Iron Crown and the title of King of Italy, which continues until the end of World War I in 1918.

==== By topic ====
====== Literature ======
- Robert of Courçon, an English cardinal, writes his Summa – devoted to questions of canon law and ethics – dealing at length with the question of usury.

====== Religion ======
- November 17 – Innocent III asks the nobles in Northern France to take military action (the so-called Albigensian Crusade) against the Cathars in Languedoc.

=== 1209 ===
==== By place ====
====== Europe ======
- May – The First Parliament of Ravennika, convened by Emperor Henry of Flanders, is held in the town of Ravennika in Greece, in an attempt to resolve the rebellion of the Lombard nobles of the Kingdom of Thessalonica. Henry pardons Lord Amédée Pofey (or Buffois), and reinvests with his fief, while the other nobles persist in their rebellion and keep to their castles. After receiving imperial recognition, Geoffrey I of Villehardouin becomes Henry's vassal, thereby subordinating Achaea directly to Constantinople.
- June – Treaty of Sapienza: The Republic of Venice recognizes the possession of the Peloponnese by Geoffrey I of Villehardouin and keeps only the fortresses of Modon and Coron. Venice also acquires an exemption of her merchants from all tariffs, and the right to establish "a church, a market and a court" in every city of Achaea.
- July 22 – Massacre at Béziers: The Crusader army, led by Simon de Monfort, arrives in the Languedoc area, and makes camp at Béziers, to start a siege. The citizens, believing that their city walls are impregnable, harass the Crusaders, by sending a group of soldiers (supported by armed civilians) to launch a sortie against their camp. When they are forced to retreat, the Crusaders storm the walls (which are not properly manned) and enter the gate, sacking and killing some 20,000 Cathars and Catholics alike.
- August 15 – Siege of Carcassonne: Simon de Montfort takes Carcassonne, after negotiating the city's surrender with Raymond Roger Trencavel (or Raimond), viscount of Béziers and Albi, who is imprisoned and dies in mysterious circumstances 3 months later in his own dungeon. The Cathars are allowed to leave and expelled with nothing more than their clothes.

====== Britain ======
- November – Against the backdrop of the continuing Papal Interdict of 1208, John, King of England, is excommunicated by Pope Innocent III. Despite the excommunication, John will continue to make amends to the Church – including giving alms to the poor whenever he defiles a holy day by hunting during it. He feeds 100 paupers to make up for when he "went into the woods on the feast of St. Mary Magdalen", and three years from now, he will feast 450 paupers "because the king went to take cranes, and he took nine, for each of which he feasted fifty paupers."
- Black Monday, Dublin: A group of 500 recently arrived settlers from Bristol are massacred by warriors of the Irish O'Byrne clan. The group (accompanied by women and children) leaves the safety of the walled city of Dublin to celebrate Easter Monday near a wood at Ranelagh, and are attacked without warning. Although a relatively obscure event in history, it is commemorated by a mustering of the Mayor, Sheriffs, and soldiers on the day, as a challenge to the native tribes for centuries afterwards.
- London Bridge is completed by a stone-arched structure. On the bridge are houses built; this is for paying the maintenance, though it has to be supplemented by other rents and by tolls.

====== Asia ======
- Spring – The Mongols led by Genghis Khan begin their first invasion against the Western Xia state (or Xi Xia). They push up along the Yellow River, capturing several garrisons and defeating an imperial army. The Mongols besiege the capital Zhongxing – which holds a well-fortified garrison of some 70,000 men (hastily reinforced with another 50,000). Genghis lacks the proper equipment and experience to take the city. In October, an attempt to flood the city by diverting the Yellow River is disastrous and floods the Mongol camp, forcing the Mongols to withdraw.
- Tamar the Great, queen of Georgia, raids Eastern Anatolia and seizes Kars. She leads a liberational war in southern Armenia.

==== By topic ====
====== Education ======
- In England, an exodus of scholars from Oxford leads to foundation of the University of Cambridge.

====== Markets ======
- King Philip II of France ("Augustus") grants a "conduit" to merchants, going to the Champagne fairs (a trade fair organized in different towns of the County of Champagne), guaranteeing the safety of their travel – as any attempt made against them – is now to be considered a crime of lèse-majesté (an offense against the king). The decision increases again the appeal of the fairs to merchants from Italy and the Low Countries.
- In Tuscany, the banking firm known as the Gran Tavola ("Great Table") is formed; most of the partners are members of the Bonsignori family.

====== Religion ======
- February 24 – The Franciscan Order is founded by the Italian priest Francis of Assisi. He and 11 of his followers journey to Rome where he receives approval of his rule from Pope Innocent III. Franciscan friars can not own any possessions of any kind. They wander and preach among the people, helping the poor and the sick. They support themselves by working and by begging for food, but they are forbidden to accept money either for work or as alms. The Franciscans work at first in Umbria and then in the rest of Italy. The impact of these street preachers and especially of their founder is immense, so that within 10 years they number some 5,000 followers.
- October 21 – Innocent III crowns Otto IV as emperor of the Holy Roman Empire in St. Peter's Basilica at Rome.
