= 1208 =

1208 in various calendars
- Gregorian calendar: 1208; MCCVIII
- Ab urbe condita: 1961
- Armenian calendar: 657; ԹՎ ՈԾԷ
- Assyrian calendar: 5958
- Balinese saka calendar: 1129–1130
- Bengali calendar: 614–615
- Berber calendar: 2158
- English Regnal year: 9 Joh. 1 – 10 Joh. 1
- Buddhist calendar: 1752
- Burmese calendar: 570
- Byzantine calendar: 6716–6717
- Chinese calendar: 丁卯年 (Fire Rabbit); 3905 or 3698 — to — 戊辰年 (Earth Dragon); 3906 or 3699
- Coptic calendar: 924–925
- Discordian calendar: 2374
- Ethiopian calendar: 1200–1201
- Hebrew calendar: 4968–4969
- Hindu calendars
- Vikram Samvat: 1264–1265
- Shaka Samvat: 1129–1130
- Kali Yuga: 4308–4309
- Holocene calendar: 11208
- Igbo calendar: 208–209
- Iranian calendar: 586–587
- Islamic calendar: 604–605
- Japanese calendar: Jōgen 2 (承元２年)
- Javanese calendar: 1116–1117
- Julian calendar: 1208; MCCVIII
- Korean calendar: 3541
- Minguo calendar: 704 before ROC 民前704年
- Nanakshahi calendar: −260
- Thai solar calendar: 1750–1751
- Tibetan calendar: མེ་མོ་ཡོས་ལོ་ (female Fire-Hare); 1334 or 953 or 181 — to — ས་ཕོ་འབྲུག་ལོ་ (male Earth-Dragon); 1335 or 954 or 182

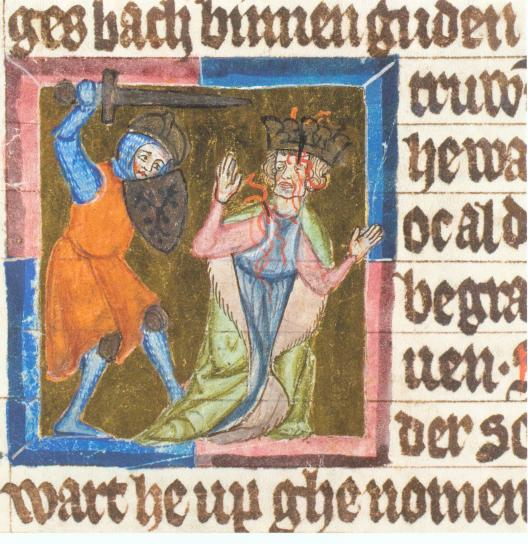
Murder of Philip of Swabia (1177–1208)

Year 1208 (MCCVIII) was a leap year starting on Tuesday of the Julian calendar.

== Events ==
=== By place ===
==== Asia ====
- April 15 – A fire breaks out in the Song Chinese capital city of Hangzhou, raging for four days and nights, destroying 58,097 houses over an area of more than 3 miles (4.8 km), killing 59 people, and an unrecorded number of other people, who are trampled while attempting to flee. The government provides temporary lodging for 5,345 people, in nearby Buddhist and Taoist monasteries. The collective victims of the disaster are given 160,000 strings of cash, along with 400 tons of rice. Some of the government officials who lose their homes take up residence in rented boathouses on the nearby West Lake.

==== Europe ====
- January 15 – Pierre de Castelnau is murdered by heretics supported by Raymond VI, count of Toulouse. He is held responsible and excommunicated by Pope Innocent III, leading to the Albigensian Crusade.
- January 31 – Battle of Lena: Swedish forces under Erik Knutsson defeat the invading Danish army (some 12,000 men). King Sverker the Younger is deposed as king of Sweden and is succeeded by Erik.
- Livonian Crusade: The Crusader Livonian Brothers of the Sword, supported by tribes of Livs and Letts, initiate raids into Ugandi County in southern Estonia, resulting in the Estonian fight for independence.
- March 24 – Innocent III places England under a Papal Interdict, as punishment for John, King of England ("Lackland")'s refusal to accept Stephen Langton as archbishop of Canterbury. During the interdict, religious services as marriages, burials, or baptisms cannot be performed. John confiscates church property of clergy who are unwilling to conduct services. Many bishops in the country flee abroad to the Continent.
- Autumn – William Marshal is recalled and humiliated by King John at court in London, while John gives his justiciar in Ireland, Meiler Fitzhenry the order to invade Marshal's lands there, burning the town of New Ross.
- June 21 – Philip of Swabia, king of Germany, is assassinated in Bamberg by the German count Otto of Wittelsbach, because Philip has refused to give him his 10-year-old daughter Beatrice in marriage.
- June 30 – Battle of Philippopolis: Bulgarian forces under Emperor (tsar) Boril are defeated by the Latin army (some 30,000 men) led by Emperor Henry of Flanders, near modern-day Plovdiv, Bulgaria.
- August 27 – Queen Irene Angelina dies in childbirth after the death of her husband Philip of Swabia at Hohenstaufen Castle, leaving four daughters: Beatrice, Maria, Kunigunde and Elisabeth.
- November 11 – Otto IV is elected by the German nobles as king of Germany at Frankfurt. He is engaged to Beatrice and travels to Milan where he receives the Iron Crown and the title of King of Italy, which continues until the end of World War I in 1918.

=== By topic ===
==== Literature ====
- Robert of Courçon, an English cardinal, writes his Summa – devoted to questions of canon law and ethics – dealing at length with the question of usury.

==== Religion ====
- November 17 – Innocent III asks the nobles in Northern France to take military action (the so-called Albigensian Crusade) against the Cathars in Languedoc.

== Births ==
- February 2 – James I ("the Conqueror"), king of Aragon (d. 1276)
- Ada van Holland, Dutch noblewoman and abbess (d. 1258)
- Berke Khan, Mongol ruler of the Golden Horde (d. 1266)
- Bolesław I of Masovia, Polish nobleman and knight (d. 1248)
- Coloman of Galicia, Hungarian prince of Halych (d. 1241)
- Gissur Þorvaldsson, Icelandic chieftain (or goði) (d. 1268)
- Kolbeinn ungi Arnórsson, Icelandic chieftain (d. 1245)
- Knut Haakonsson, Norwegian nobleman (jarl) (d. 1261)
- Margaret Skulesdatter, queen consort of Norway (d. 1270)
- Sempad the Constable, Armenian nobleman (d. 1276)
- Simon de Montfort, 6th Earl of Leicester, English nobleman (d. 1265)
- Thomas de Beaumont, English nobleman (d. 1242)

== Deaths ==
- January 15 – Pierre de Castelnau, French priest (assassinated)
- January 28 – Julian of Cuenca, Spanish bishop (b. 1127)
- February 18 – Mark Ibn Kunbar, Egyptian Coptic priest
- April 22 – Philip of Poitou (or Poitiers), bishop of Durham
- June 21 – Philip of Swabia, king of Germany (b. 1177)
- August 27 – Irene Angelina, queen consort of Sicily and Germany
- August 29 – Dietrich von Kittlitz, bishop of Meissen
- October 6 – Geoffrey de Muschamp, bishop of Coventry
- November 9 – Sancha of Castile, queen consort of Aragon
- December 29 – Zhangzong of Jin, Chinese emperor (b. 1168)
- Bridget Haraldsdotter, queen consort of Sweden (approximate date)
- Ermengol VIII (or Armengol), count of Urgell (b. 1158)
- Kolbeinn Tumason, Icelandic chieftain and poet (b. 1173)
- Knut Birgersson, Swedish nobleman (jarl) and knight
- Leo Sgouros (or Sgurus), Byzantine governor and despot
- Peter of Angoulême, Latin bishop and patriarch of Antioch
- William IV of Forcalquier, French nobleman (b. 1130)
- Ya'qub ibn Ishaq al-Israili, Egyptian Jewish physician
