= 1200 (disambiguation) =

1200 may refer to:

- 1200 (number)

== Dates ==
- 1200 CE (MCC), a year in the Western calendar, "A.D. 1200"
  - 1200s (decade), the decade from 1200CE to 1210CE
  - 1200s (century), the 13th century, from 1200CE to 1300CE
- 1200 BC, a year in the Western calendar, "1200 BCE"
  - 1200s BC (decade), the decade from 1200BCE to 1210BCE
  - 1200s BC (century), the 13th century BCE, from 1200BCE to 1300BCE

== Places ==
- 1200 Imperatrix 1931 RH (asteroid 1200), main belt asteroid
- Louisiana Highway 1200
- A1200 road (UK) in London, England

== Vehicles ==
- Ventura 1200, a proposed ultralight airplane
- Škoda 1200, a family car
- Datsun 1200, a subcompact car
- Fiat 1200, a series of cars all based on the 1100 mechanicals
- Simca 1200, also known as the Talbot 1200, a series of compact family cars
- Ram 1200, a nameplate used by Ram for various models

== Other uses ==
- 1200 AM, an AM radio frequency
- Amiga 1200, a personal computer
- Winchester Model 1200, a pump-action shotgun
- Noon, the twelfth hour of the clock

== See also ==
- MCC (disambiguation)
- 1200s (disambiguation)
- AM1200 (disambiguation)
- 1200 series (disambiguation)
