= Jabloňovce =

Village and municipality in Slovakia

Jabloňovce Hontalmás
- Municipality
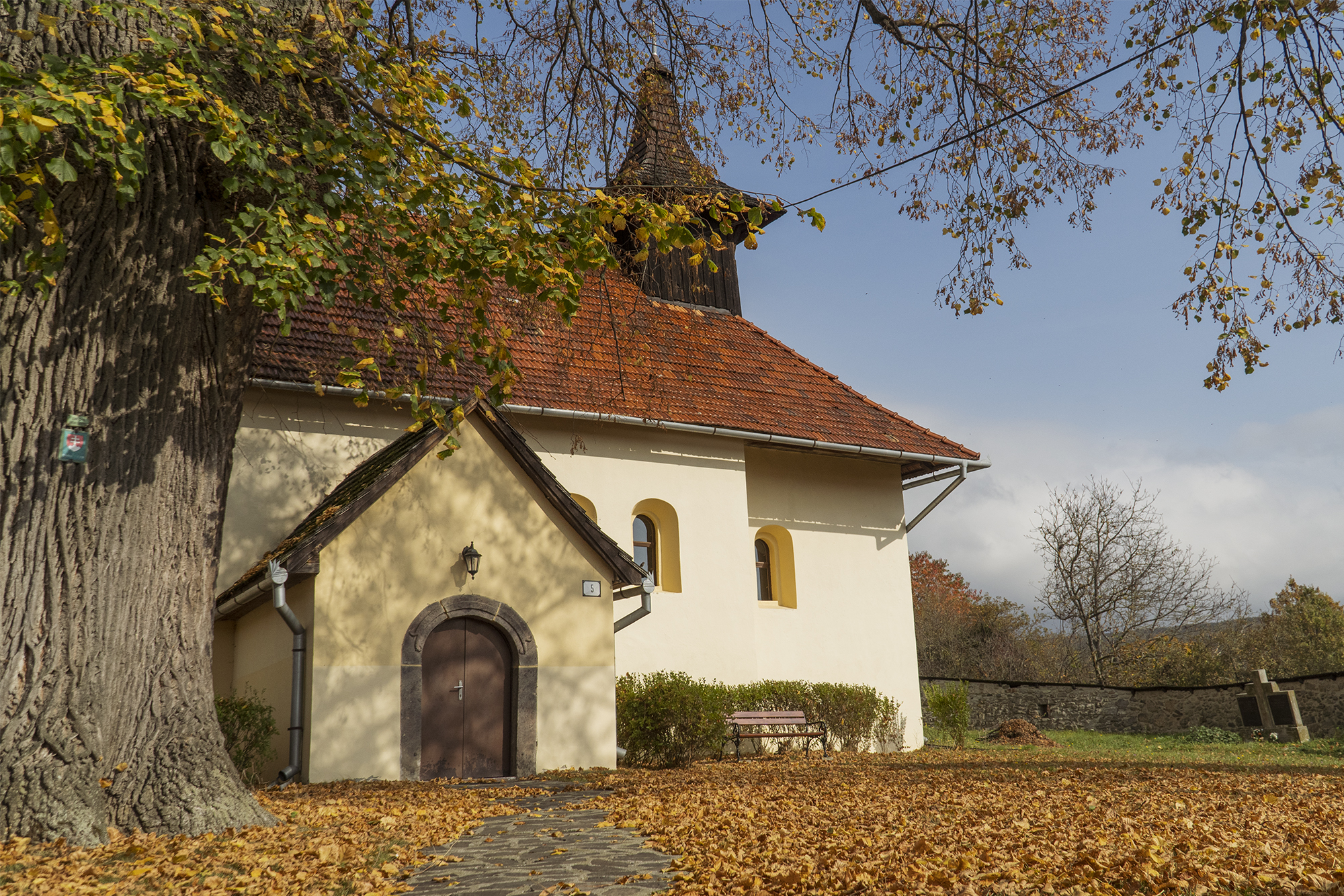
- Lutheran church in Jabloňovce

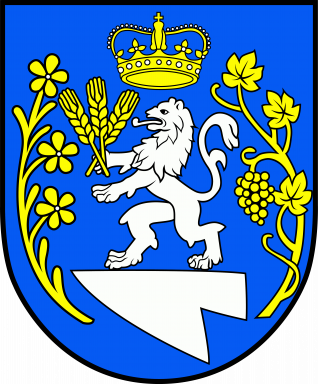
- Flag Coat of arms

- Location of Jabloňovce in the Nitra Region Location of Jabloňovce in Slovakia
- Coordinates: 48.32°N 18.80°E
- Country: Slovakia
- Region: Nitra Region
- District: Levice District
- First mentioned: 1245

Area
  - Total: 34.69 km^{2} (13.39 sq mi)
- Elevation: 283 m (928 ft)

Population (2025)
  - Total: 197
- Time zone: UTC+1 (CET)
  - Summer (DST): UTC+2 (CEST)
- Postal code: 935 06
- Area code: +421 36
- Vehicle registration plate (until 2022): LV
- Website: www.obecjablonovce.sk

Jabloňovce (Hungarian: Hontalmás) is a village and municipality in the Levice District in the Nitra Region of Slovakia.

== History ==
In historical records the village was first mentioned in 1245. Throughout history, the municipality belonged to several landlords, including members of the Esterházy family. Local people were mainly engaged in agriculture.

== Geography ==
The municipality lies at an altitude of 283 metres (928 ft) and covers an area of 34.69 km^{2} (13.39 sq mi) (2025).

== Population ==
Population statistic (10 years)
Year	1995	2005	2015	2025
Count	238	210	201	197
Difference		−11.76%	−4.28%	−1.99%

Population statistic
Year	2024	2025
Count	199	197
Difference		−1.00%

It has a population of 197 people (31 December 2025).

=== Ethnicity ===
Census 2021 (1+ %)
Ethnicity	Number	Fraction
Slovak	193	92.34%
Not found out	14	6.69%
Czech	3	1.43%
Total	209	

In year 2021 was 209 people by ethnicity 193 as Slovak, 14 as Not found out, 3 as Czech, 2 as Russian and 1 as Hungarian.

Note on population: The difference values of population numbers in the table "Population statistic" and in the sections "Ethnicity" & "Religion" is caused by the use of various statistical methods.

=== Religion ===
Census 2021 (1+ %)
Religion	Number	Fraction
Roman Catholic Church	100	47.85%
None	51	24.4%
Evangelical Church	39	18.66%
Not found out	14	6.7%
Greek Catholic Church	3	1.44%
Total	209	

In year 2021 was 209 people by religion 100 from Roman Catholic Church, 51 from None, 39 from Evangelical Church, 14 from Not found out, 3 from Greek Catholic Church, 1 from Islam and 1 from Ad hoc movements.

== Facilities ==
The village has a public library and a soccer pitch.

== Genealogical resources ==
The records for genealogical research are available at the state archive "Statny Archiv in Nitra, Slovakia"

== See also ==
- List of municipalities and towns in Slovakia
