= 1200s =

1200s may refer to:

- The century from 1200 to 1299, almost synonymous with the 13th century (1201–1300).
- 1200s (decade), the period from 1200 to 1209

== See also ==
- 1200s BC (decade)
- 1200s BC (century)
- 1200 (disambiguation)
