= AM1200 =

AM1200 or AM 1200 may refer to:

- 1200 AM, a list of radio stations on 1200 kHz
- AM1200 (film), a 2008 thriller starring Eric Lange

== See also ==
- 1200 (disambiguation)
