= Fujiwara no Akiuji =

Japanese poet

Fujiwara no Akiuji (藤原 顕氏 1207 – 8 November 1274) was a Japanese nobleman and waka poet of the Kamakura period.

== Life ==
Fujiwara no Akiuji was born in 1207. A member of the Northern Branch (Hokke) of the Fujiwara clan, he was the second son of Fujiwara no Akiie and the younger brother of Fujiwara no Tomoie.

He reached the Junior Second Rank at court, and founded the Kamiyagawa lineage (紙屋河家 Kamiyagawa-ke) within the Rokujō branch of the Fujiwara clan. He is occasionally mentioned in the Azuma Kagami as a court envoy to Kantō (関東祗候).

He died on the eighth day of the eleventh month of Bun'ei 11 in 1274.

== Poetry ==
Akiuji was a central figure in the Kamakura waka poetic circle, and in Kyoto helped establish the anti-Mikohidari faction, along with his brother Tomoie and Fujiwara no Mitsutoshi. His poetry was a regular fixture in the uta-awase contests and other poetic gatherings organized by the members of this faction, but it was not highly appreciated.

His poems were included in the records of a large number of uta-awase, including the Kasuga Wakamiya-sha Uta-awase (春日若宮社歌合) and the Munetaka-shinnō-ke Hyakugojū-ban Uta-awase (宗尊親王家百五十番歌合), as well as in the Hōji On-hyakushu (宝治御百首). His poems were also included in private anthologies that collected the works of Kamakura poets, including the Tōsen Waka Rokujō (東撰和歌六帖), the Genzon Waka Rokujō (現存和歌六帖) and the Un'yō Wakashū.

Eleven of his poems were included in imperial anthologies from the Shoku Gosenshū on. He left a personal collection, the Akiuji-shū,
