= Fujiwara no Tomoie =

Japanese poet

Fujiwara no Tomoie (藤原知家 1182 - 1258) was a waka poet and Japanese nobleman active in the Heian period and early Kamakura period. He is designated as a member of the New Thirty-Six Immortals of Poetry (新三十六歌仙, Shinsanjūrokkasen). He was also known as Renshō (蓮性). He was the elder brother of Fujiwara no Akiuji.

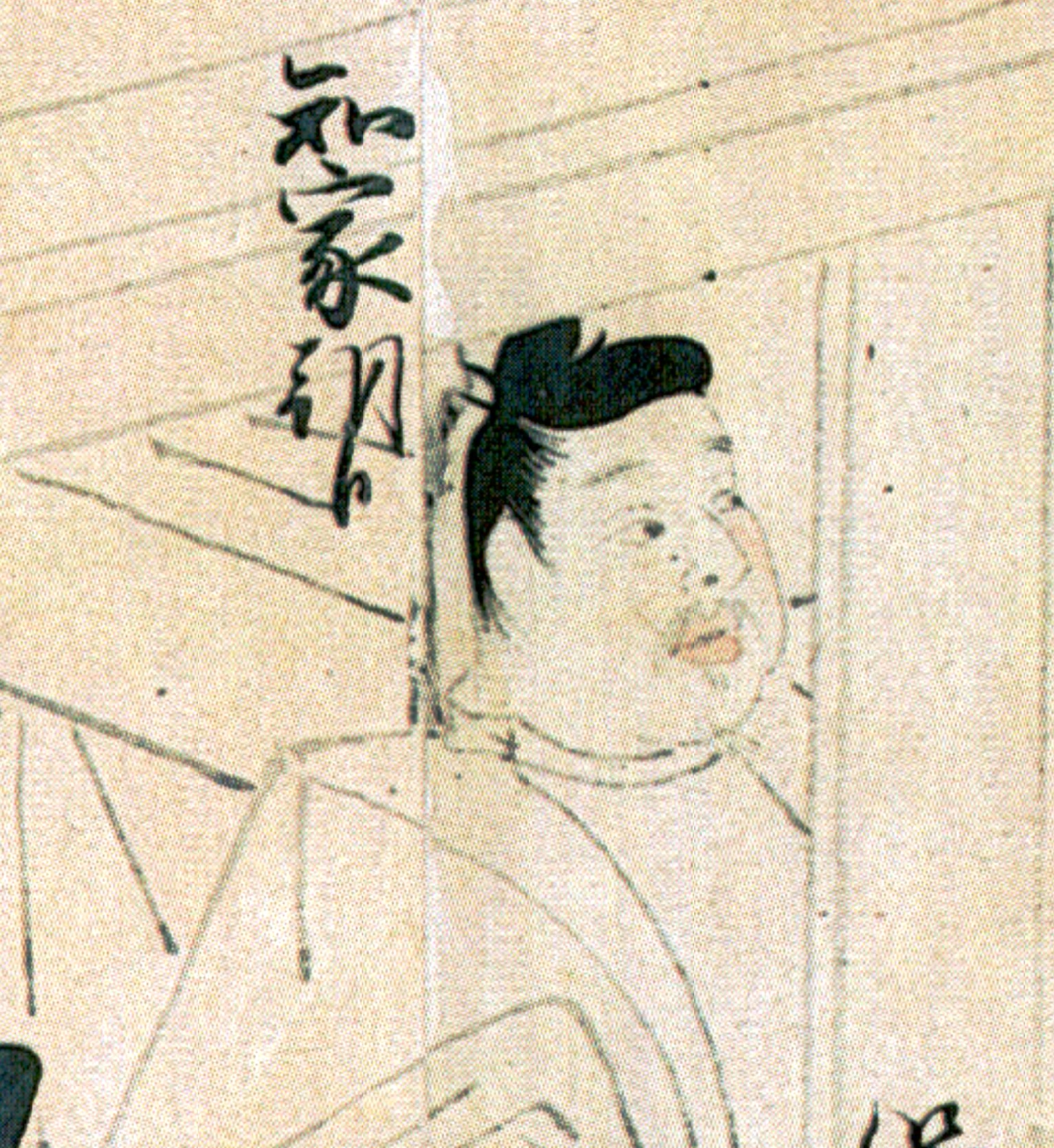
