= Un'yō Wakashū =

The Un'yō Wakashū (雲葉和歌集) is a Japanese waka anthology compiled by Kujō Motoie in the Kamakura period. Only eleven of a presumed twenty volumes have survived.

== Compilation and date ==
The Un'yō Wakashū was the shisenshū (privately compiled anthology) of Kujō Motoie.

The collection has been dated to between the third month of 1253 and the third month of the following year. This date was arrived at on the basis of the last dated poem (#904) having been composed during a visit by the retired emperor to Tennōji in the third month of 1253, and Fujiwara no Narisane (藤原成実) being referred to as a courtier of the Senior Third Rank, when he was promoted to the Junior Second Rank on the eighth day of the third month of 1254.

It is thought that Fujiwara no Tameie's publication of the Shoku Gosen Wakashū in late 1251 provided part of the impetus for the compilation of the Un'yō Wakashū.

== Contents ==
The Gunsho Ruijū text and others include ten volumes on: spring (in three parts), summer, autumn (in three parts), winter, congratulations and travel, but the Shōkōkan text includes an additional volume of love poetry. This brings the total number of surviving volumes to eleven, and a total of 1,032 of its poems survive in at least one of the extant texts.

The Fuboku Wakashō (未木和歌抄) preserves an additional thirty-odd poems that originally came from the lost volumes of the Un'yō Wakashū, and based on the content of these poems it is theorized that the lost volumes (including the one volume of love poetry that survives in a single manuscript) were: love (in five parts), miscellaneous (in three parts), Shinto and Buddhism. The size, distribution and topics of the volumes, ordering of the poems and so on are all modeled on the imperial collections.

In total, at least one poem by each of 287 poets are included among the surviving portions. The compiler's father, Kujō Yoshitsune, is most represented, with 36 poems. He is followed by Fujiwara no Shunzei and Emperor Go-Toba with 34 each; Fujiwara no Ietaka with 33; Fujiwara no Teika with 31;Jien with 30; Emperor Juntoku with 28; and Jakuren and Emperor Tsuchimikado with 25 each. (Note: Satō (1983, p. 328) gives slightly different figures: Shunzei with 36; Go-Toba and Yoshitsune with 35 each; Teika with 33; Juntoku, Jien and Ietaka with 29 each; Jakuren with 26; Tsuchimikado with 25; and Saigyō with 22.)

The collection itself does not have any standout characteristics, but the selection of poems reveals Motoie's tastes as a poet.

== Textual tradition ==
It is assumed that the collection originally comprised twenty volumes, but only eleven are extant.

The National Diet Archives hold two copies of the text, and other copies have been preserved in the Shōkōkan and elsewhere.

== Works cited ==
- Handa, Kōhei (1999). "Jakuren no Shisen-Wakashū Nyūshūka nitsuite". Nishōgakusha Daigaku Ronshū (in Japanese). 42 (1). Nishogakusha University: 25–45.
- Satō, Tsuneo (1983). "Un'yō Wakashū". Nihon Koten Bungaku Daijiten 日本古典文学大辞典 (in Japanese). Vol. 1. Tokyo: Iwanami Shoten. p. 328. OCLC 11917421.
