= 1200 series =

1200 series may refer to the following:

== Japanese trains ==
- JR Shikoku 1200 series diesel multiple unit
- Kintetsu 1200 series electric multiple unit
- Meitetsu 1200 series electric multiple unit

== Other ==
- Compaq Presario 1200 series of notebook computers

== See also ==
- 1200 (disambiguation)
