= 1200 Imperatrix =

Hygiean asteroid

Discovery
- Discovered by: K. Reinmuth
- Discovery site: Heidelberg Obs.
- Discovery date: 14 September 1931

Designations
- Pronunciation: /ɪmpəˈreɪtrɪks/
- Named after: empress (in Latin)
- Alternative designations: 1931 RH · 1929 CX; 1950 DC_{1} · 1957 OY; A913 EC · A915 TL; A924 GC
- Minor planet category: main-belt · (outer); Hygiea

Orbital characteristics
- Epoch 4 September 2017 (JD 2458000.5)
- Uncertainty parameter 0
- Observation arc: 101.75 yr (37,165 days)
- Aphelion: 3.3873 AU
- Perihelion: 2.7436 AU
- Semi-major axis: 3.0654 AU
- Eccentricity: 0.1050
- Orbital period (sidereal): 5.37 yr (1,960 days)
- Mean anomaly: 114.85°
- Mean motion: 0° 11^{m} 0.96^{s} / day
- Inclination: 4.5935°
- Longitude of ascending node: 204.77°
- Argument of perihelion: 51.583°

Physical characteristics
- Dimensions: 36.00±0.42 km 37.36±9.71 km 39.39 km (derived); 39.52±3.9 km 42.006±0.390 km 42.777±0.309 km 43.64±0.61 km
- Synodic rotation period: 13.34±0.11 h 17.769±0.002 h
- Geometric albedo: 0.04±0.04; 0.0545 (derived); 0.060±0.002; 0.0609±0.0118; 0.065±0.009; 0.0714±0.017
- Spectral type: C (assumed)
- Absolute magnitude (H): 10.50 · 10.74±0.28 · 10.80 · 10.9 · 10.91

1200 Imperatrix (provisional designation 1931 RH) is a carbonaceous Hygiean asteroid from the outer regions of the asteroid belt, approximately 40 kilometres (25 mi) in diameter. It was discovered by German astronomer Karl Reinmuth at the Heidelberg-Königstuhl State Observatory on 14 September 1931. The asteroid was named after the Latin word for empress.

== Orbit and classification ==
Imperatrix is a member of the Hygiea family (601), a very large asteroid family named after 10 Hygiea, the main belt's fourth-largest asteroid. 'mperatrix orbits the Sun in the outer main-belt at a distance of 2.7–3.4 AU once every 5 years and 4 months (1,960 days). Its orbit has an eccentricity of 0.11 and an inclination of 5° with respect to the ecliptic.

The body's observation arc begins with its first identification as A913 EC at Simeiz Observatory in March 1913, more than 18 years prior to its official discovery observation at Heidelberg.

== Physical characteristics ==
Imperatrix is an assumed C-type asteroid which is also the overall spectral type of the Hygiea family.

=== Rotation period ===
In August 2000, a rotational lightcurve of Imperatrix was obtained from photometric observations at the River Oaks Observatory (915) in Texas. Lightcurve analysis gave a rotation period of 13.34 hours with a brightness variation of 0.23 magnitude (U=2). In September 2011, photometric observations by French amateur astronomers Pierre Antonini and René Roy gave a refined period of 17.769 hours with an amplitude of 0.21 magnitude (U=3).

=== Diameter and albedo ===
According to the surveys carried out by the Infrared Astronomical Satellite IRAS, the Japanese Akari satellite and the NEOWISE mission of NASA's Wide-field Infrared Survey Explorer, Imperatrix measures between 36.00 and 43.64 kilometers in diameter and its surface has an albedo between 0.04 and 0.0714.

The Collaborative Asteroid Lightcurve Link derives an albedo of 0.0545 and a diameter of 39.39 kilometers based on an absolute magnitude of 10.8.

Four stellar occultation events by 1200 Imperatrix have been observed, all in 2021.

== Naming ==
This minor planet was named "Imperatrix", which is Latin for empress. The naming was proposed by German ARI-astronomer Gustav Stracke, after whom 1019 Strackea was named. Any specific reference to an occurrence or person is unknown, according to the author of the Dictionary of Minor Planets, Lutz Schmadel and his communications with Ingrid van Houten-Groeneveld, who also worked at Heidelberg).
