= Malik ibn al-Murahhal =

Maghrebi writer

Malik ibn al-Murahhal (Arabic: مالك بن المرحل السبتي) or Abu l-Hakam/Abu l-Mayd Malik ibn Abd al-Rahman ibn Ali ibn Abd al-Rahman ibn (al-)Faray ibn (al-)Azraq ibb Saad/Munir ibn Salim ibn (al-)Faray al-Masmudi al-Malaqi al-Sabti (13 August 1207, in Málaga – 10 April 1299, in Fez) is considered to be one of the greatest Maghrebi poets of Masmuda. He belonged to a Masmudi family and was born in Málaga, but grew up in Ceuta and was the chancellor of Marinid sultans like Abu Yusuf Yaqub.
