= Martin of León =

Spanish Augustinian canon

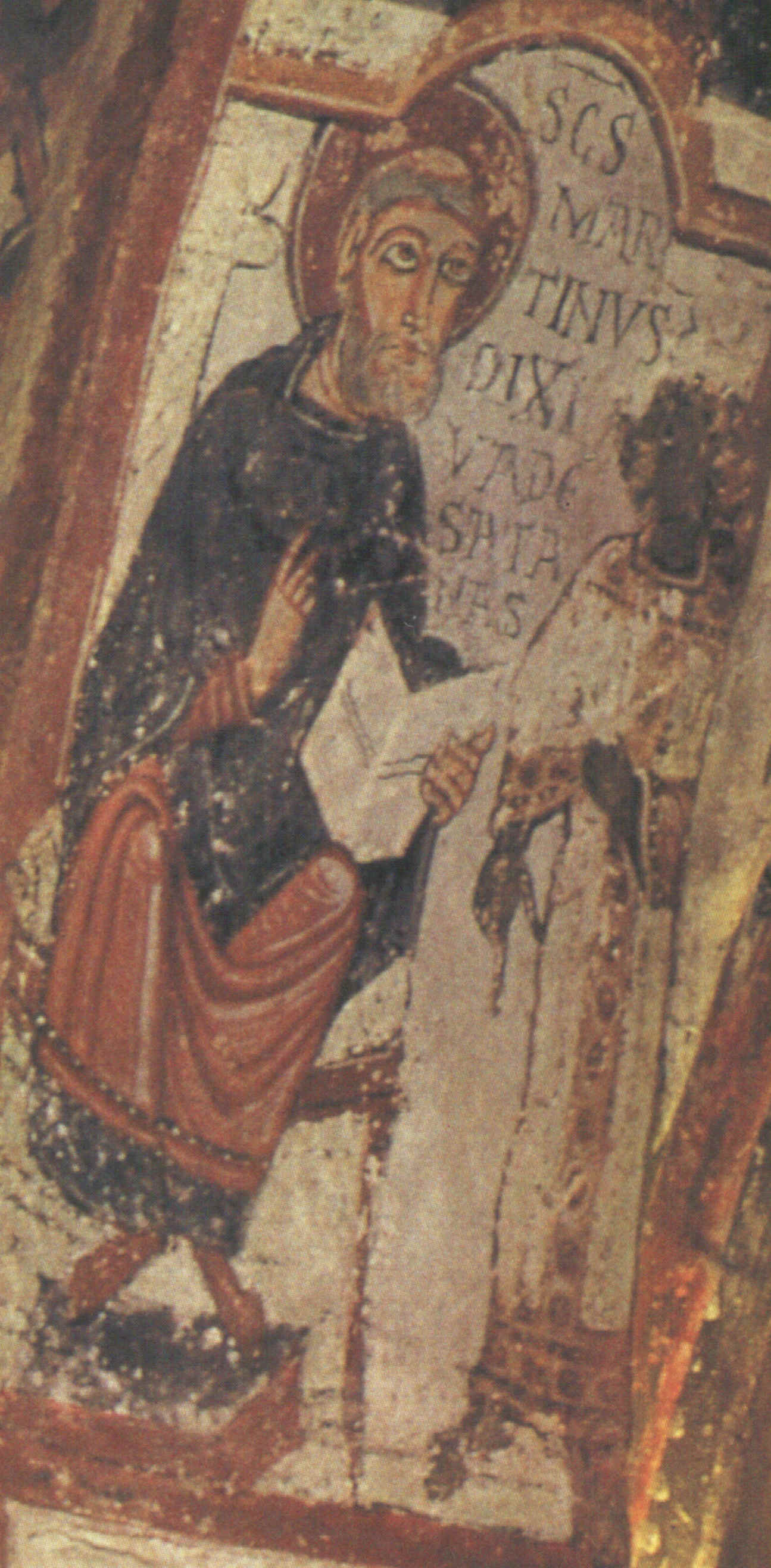
- Martin of León in a fresco from San Isidoro
- Born: León, Spain
- Died: 12 January 1203
- Venerated in: Roman Catholic Church
- Major shrine: Basilica of San Isidoro, León
- Feast: January 12

Martin of León (c. 1130 – 12 January 1203) was a priest and canon regular of the Augustinian Order known for his biblical commentaries and sermons. He is regarded as a saint.

== Life ==
Born at León, Martin, along with his father Juan, withdrew from the world to the canonry of San Marcelo de León after the death of his mother. Martin was educated at this canonry, and after the death of his father, Martin decided to undertake a major pilgrimage, visiting the cities of Rome and Constantinople.

Martin continued his education at the University of Paris under Peter Lombard. Returning to Spain, he took the religious habit at San Marcelo, but after seeing this monastery had been secularized by the bishops he entered the collegiate church of San Isidoro in the same city.

Martin was in Italy during the pontificate of Urban III (1185–1187). From there he travelled to the Holy Land with the Third Crusade. He remained in the Holy Land two years in the service of the Hospitallers.

Martin distinguished himself by his zealous observance, his charity, and his deep devotion to the Blessed Sacrament. The date of his death is given to us by the necrology preserved in San Isidoro. He died on 12 January 1203 of natural causes. The religious of San Isidoro dedicated a chapel to Martin very early and celebrated his feast each year.

Lucas of Tuy, another monk of San Isidoro, wrote a biography of Martin, Vita sancti Martini.

== Works ==
Martin wrote commentaries on different Epistles and the Apocalypse, and he left numerous discourses on the many varied subjects. His book of sermons, Liber Sermonum, runs in manuscript to about 700 folios (1400 pages). It contains 54 lengthy sermons that may have served more as models for preachers than as texts to be preached.
