= Ya'qub ibn Ishaq al-Israili =

Ya'qub ibn Ishaq al-Israili (Arabic: يعقوب بن إسحاق الاسرائيلي; died 1208 CE) was a 12th-century Egyptian Jewish physician.

== Works ==
- "Treatise of the Errors of the Physicians in Damascus": on the improper medical care he observed during a visit to Damascus.

In addition, Ibn Abi Usaibia recorded that Ya'qub wrote the following works:

- "Maḳalah fi Kawanîn Ṭabiyah" (Treatise on the Canons of Medicine)
- "Kitab al-Nazh" (Book of Pleasure)
- "Kitab fi Mizaj Dimashka" (Book Containing Three Treatises)
- "Masail Ṭabiyah" (Questions of Medicine)
