= Papal Interdict of 1208 =

Interdict on England and Wales

The Papal Interdict of 1208 was an interdict laid on England and Wales by Pope Innocent III which generally enforced the closure of the churches, forbade the administration of the Catholic sacraments, and prohibited the use of churchyards for burials. Issued on 23 March 1208, the interdict lasted for more than six years until it was lifted on 2 July 1214.

Pope Innocent III placed the Kingdom of England under an interdict after King John refused to accept the pope's appointee, Stephen Langton, as Archbishop of Canterbury.
