= Otto VIII, Count Palatine of Bavaria =

Otto VIII, Count of Bavaria (before 1180 – 7 March 1209) was Count Palatine of Bavaria from 1189 to 1209.

== Life ==
Otto VIII was the son of Otto VII, and thereby the grandson of Otto IV, Count of Scheyern.

=== Regicide ===
On 21 June 1208 Otto VIII murdered German King Philip of Swabia in Bamberg, during the wedding of Philip's niece Countess Beatrice II of Burgundy with Duke Otto of Merania.

The motives for the murder have not been conclusively established. Allegedly the Wittelsbach scion, already known for his unstable character, had fallen into a rage when he learned of the dissolution of his betrothal to Gertrude of Silesia by her father, the Piast duke Henry I the Bearded. Duke Henry was apparently informed of the Wittelsbach's cruel tendencies and in an act of concern for his young daughter decided to terminate the marriage agreement. Otto proceeded to blame Philip for another spurned marriage alliance (the first being to one of Philip's own daughters, Beatrice or Kunigunde, who was betrothed to Wenceslaus I of Bohemia in 1207) and swore revenge on the German King.

== Death ==
He was subsequently put under imperial ban (outlawed). Henry of Kalden was trusted with the task to hunt him down, found him at Oberndorf by Kelheim and decapitated him on the spot on 7 March 1209 . His head was thrown in the Danube, while the corpse was kept in a barrel for years. Monks from Indersdorf Abbey eventually stole the barrel and buried the corpse on monastery grounds.

Otto VIII, Count Palatine of Bavaria House of Wittelsbach Born: Before 1180 Died: 7 March 1209
Regnal titles
| Preceded by Otto VII | Count Palatine of Bavaria; 1189-1209 | Succeeded by Rapoto II |
