= Kujō Motoie =

Kujō Motoie (九条基家, 1203-1280) was a waka poet and Japanese nobleman active in the early Kamakura period. He is designated as a member of the New Thirty-Six Immortals of Poetry (新三十六歌仙, Shinsanjūrokkasen).
