= 1245 =

1245 in various calendars
- Gregorian calendar: 1245; MCCXLV
- Ab urbe condita: 1998
- Armenian calendar: 694; ԹՎ ՈՂԴ
- Assyrian calendar: 5995
- Balinese saka calendar: 1166–1167
- Bengali calendar: 651–652
- Berber calendar: 2195
- English Regnal year: 29 Hen. 3 – 30 Hen. 3
- Buddhist calendar: 1789
- Burmese calendar: 607
- Byzantine calendar: 6753–6754
- Chinese calendar: 甲辰年 (Wood Dragon); 3942 or 3735 — to — 乙巳年 (Wood Snake); 3943 or 3736
- Coptic calendar: 961–962
- Discordian calendar: 2411
- Ethiopian calendar: 1237–1238
- Hebrew calendar: 5005–5006
- Hindu calendars
- Vikram Samvat: 1301–1302
- Shaka Samvat: 1166–1167
- Kali Yuga: 4345–4346
- Holocene calendar: 11245
- Igbo calendar: 245–246
- Iranian calendar: 623–624
- Islamic calendar: 642–643
- Japanese calendar: Kangen 3 (寛元３年)
- Javanese calendar: 1154–1155
- Julian calendar: 1245; MCCXLV
- Korean calendar: 3578
- Minguo calendar: 667 before ROC 民前667年
- Nanakshahi calendar: −223
- Thai solar calendar: 1787–1788
- Tibetan calendar: ཤིང་ཕོ་འབྲུག་ལོ་ (male Wood-Dragon); 1371 or 990 or 218 — to — ཤིང་མོ་སྦྲུལ་ལོ་ (female Wood-Snake); 1372 or 991 or 219

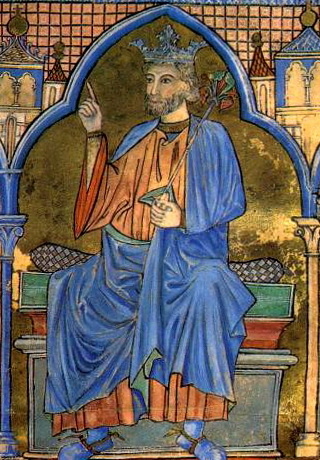
Ferdinand III of Castile (r. 1217–1252)

Year 1245 (MCCXLV) was a common year starting on Sunday of the Julian calendar.

== Events ==
=== By place ===
==== Europe ====
- Winter – Siege of Jaén: Castilian forces under King Ferdinand III ("the Saint") besiege the Moorish-held city of Jaén. During the siege Moorish knights sally out and manage to capture a Castilian supply caravan. Meanwhile, Ferdinand tries to launch attacks on the various city gates, but all are ineffective.
- In witness of the toll taken by war and fiscal pressure in the Kingdom of Castile, the region of Segovia is described this year as depopulated and sterile.

==== England ====
- King Henry III starts the work of rebuilding Westminster Abbey, as a tribute to Edward the Confessor.

==== Levant ====
- April – Egyptian forces under As-Salih Ayyub besiege the city of Damascus. After six months, As-Salih Ismail, ruler of Damascus, surrenders to Ayyub in return for a vassal-principality, consisting of Baalbek and the Hauran. Ayyub is awarded the title of sultan by Caliph Al-Musta'sim in Baghdad.

=== By topic ===
==== Religion ====
- February 21 – Thomas, bishop of Turku (modern Finland), is granted resignation by Pope Innocent IV. He admits to committing several felonies, such as torturing and forging a papal letter.
- April 16 – Innocent IV sends Giovanni da Pian del Carpine (accompanied by Stephen of Bohemia) to the Mongol court at Karakorum, suggesting that the Mongols convert to Christianity.
- June 28 – First Council of Lyon: In a general church council held at Lyon, Innocent IV declares Emperor Frederick II excommunicated and deposed. He proclaims the Seventh Crusade.

== Births ==
- January 16 – Edmund Crouchback, son of Henry III (d. 1296)
- May 1 – Philip III (the Bold), king of France (d. 1285)
- November 14 – Sang Sapurba, Indonesian ruler (d. 1316)
- Antony Bek (or Beck), English bishop and patriarch (d. 1311)
- Araniko (or Anige), Nepalese architect and painter (d. 1306)
- Eric of Brandenburg, archbishop of Magdeburg (d. 1295)
- Fujiwara no Saneko, Japanese empress consort (d. 1272)
- Giovanna da Signa, Italian miracle worker and saint (d. 1307)
- Kikuchi Takefusa, Japanese nobleman and samurai (d. 1285)
- Kunigunda of Halych, queen consort of Bohemia (d. 1285)
- Ma Duanlin, Chinese encyclopaedist and politician (d. 1322)
- Nichirō, Japanese Buddhist disciple and scholar (d. 1320)
- Rinaldo da Concorezzo, Italian priest and archbishop (d. 1321)
- Roger Bigod, English nobleman and Lord Marshal (d. 1306)
- Thomas de Berkeley (the Wise), English nobleman (d. 1321)
- Yahballaha III, patriarch of the Church of the East (d. 1317)
- Ziemomysł of Kuyavia, Polish ruler of Bydgoszcz (d. 1287)

== Deaths ==
- January 27 – Ralph of Maidstone, bishop of Hereford
- January 28 – Giovanni Colonna, Italian cardinal (b. 1170)
- February 8 – John of la Rochelle, French theologian (b. 1200)
- February 15 – Baldwin de Redvers, English nobleman (b. 1217)
- March 22 – Roger I of Fézensaguet, French nobleman (b. 1190)
- July 22 – Kolbeinn ungi Arnórsson, Icelandic chieftain (b. 1208)
- August 19 – Ramon Berenguer IV, Spanish nobleman (b. 1198)
- August 21 – Alexander of Hales, English theologian (b. 1185)
- November 27 – Walter Marshal, English nobleman (b. 1209)
- December 4 – Christian of Oliva, bishop of Prussia (b. 1180)
- Adam of Harcarse, Scottish Cistercian priest and abbot
- Beatrice d'Este, queen consort of Hungary (b. 1215)
- Cletus Bél, Hungarian prelate, bishop and chancellor
- Diya al-Din al-Maqdisi, Syrian scholar and writer (b. 1173)
- Fujiwara no Tadataka, Japanese regent and monk (b. 1163)
- Guillaume le Vinier, French composer and poet (b. 1190)
- Ibn al-Salah, Syrian scholar, imam and writer (b. 1181)
- Isabel de Bolebec, English noblewoman and co-heiress
- Rusudan of Georgia, queen consort of Georgia (b. 1194)
