= Ashikaga Yoshikane =

Japanese samurai and monk

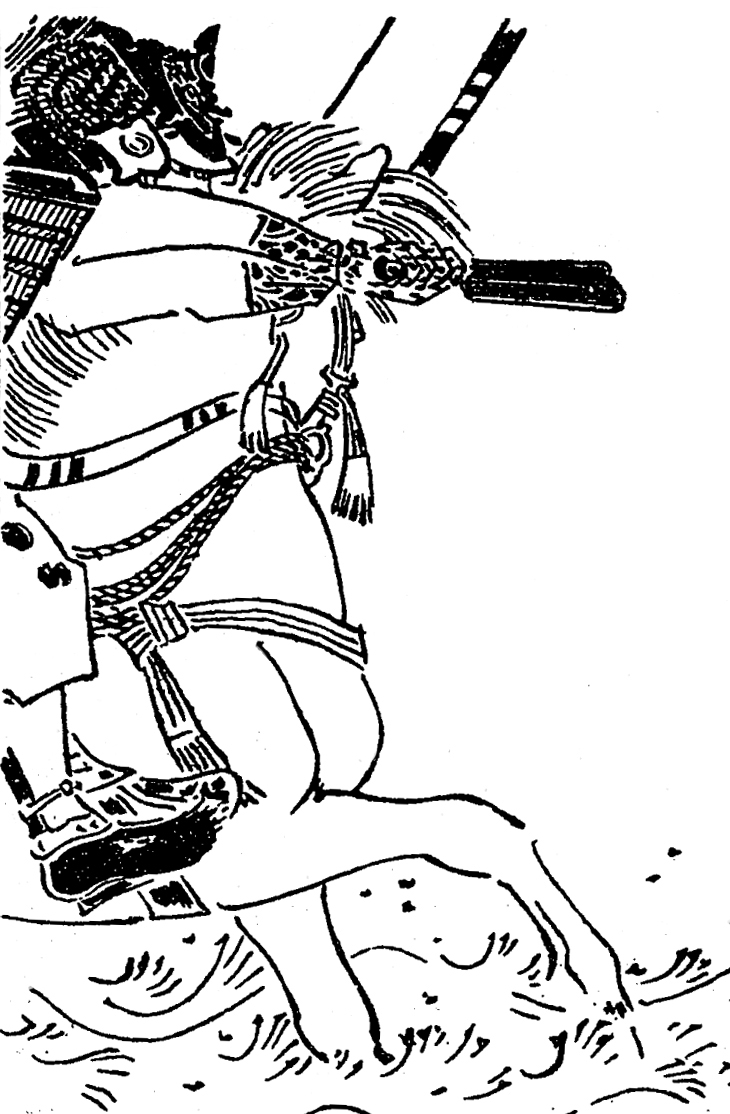
Ashikaga Yoshikane

Ashikaga Yoshikane (足利義兼; c. 1154 – April 5, 1199) was a Japanese samurai military commander, feudal lord in the late Heian and early Kamakura period of Japan's history. He played an active part in the Jishō-Juei War and the later military campaign as a closely related person of the first Kamakura shōgun Minamoto no Yoritomo, and made Ashikaga clan influential position in gokenin vassal of the Kamakura shogunate.

== Genealogy ==
Yoshikane was the third son of Minamoto no Yoshiyasu who was the founder of the Ashikaga clan and the grandson of Minamoto no Yoshiie. In the Hōgen Rebellion, Yoshikane's father Yoshiyasu was one of the commanders of forces loyal to Emperor Go-Shirakawa including father of Minamoto no Yoritomo, Minamoto no Yoshitomo and Taira no Kiyomori and others.

Yoshikane's mother was an adopted daughter and granddaughter of Fujiwara no Suenori, and was a niece of mother of Yoritomo.

== Life ==
- 1157 (Hōgen 2, 5th month): Minamoto no Yoshiyasu died, and Yoshikane became the head of the Ashikaga clan.
- About 1175–1180 (Angen, Jishō eras): He visited the capital Kyoto, and served princess Hachijyōin Akiko Naishinnō in her court as a court official Kurōdo (蔵人). Prince Mochihito who called for the revolt against Heike later was Princess Akiko's adopted son. Minamoto no Yukiie who conveyed the command of a prince to various places became her court's Kurōdo later, too.
- 1180 (Jishō 4): After Minamoto no Yoritomo raised an army against Heike in Izu Province, Yoshikane who had returned to Ashikaga Manor joined it soon afterwards.
- 1181 (Jishō 5, 2nd month): Yoshikane married a daughter of Hōjō Tokimasa, Tokiko by intermediation of Yoritomo and became the brother-in-law of him.
- 1184 (Juei 3, 5th month): In the subjugation of the remnants of Minamoto no Yoshitaka, son of Minamoto no Yoshinaka, he distinguished himself on the field of battle.
- 1184 (Juei 3, 8th month – ): He joined Minamoto no Noriyori's forces, and took part in various battles in the West Japan and defeated Heike.
- 1185 (Bunji 1, 5th month): He was appointed the governor of Shimotsuke Province.
- 1189 (Bunji 5, 7th–9th month): In the Ōshū War, he served as one of the commanders of the Kamakura administration forces, and arrested a guardian of Fujiwara no Yasuhira.
- 1190 (Kenkyū 1, 1st–3rd month): In the Ōkawa Kanetō rebellion, he was appointed the commander in chief of the Kamakura administration forces, and subjugated the revolt.
- 1195 (Kenkyū 6, 3rd month): He became a Buddhist monk; and he took the name Gishō (義称). He retreated to Kabasakidera temple in Ashikaga, Shimotsuke Province. It is said that this secluded life was to escape from political dispute.

== Family ==
- Father: Minamoto no Yoshiyasu
- Mother: daughter of Fujiwara no Noritada
- Wife: Hōjō Tokiko
- Children:
  - Ashikaga Yoshiuji (1189–1225)
  - Ashikaga Yoshizumi (1175–1210)

== See also ==
- Ashikaga clan
- Genpei War
- Kawachi Genji
- Minamoto no Yoritomo
- Seiwa Genji
