= 12th century =

One hundred years, from 1101 to 1200

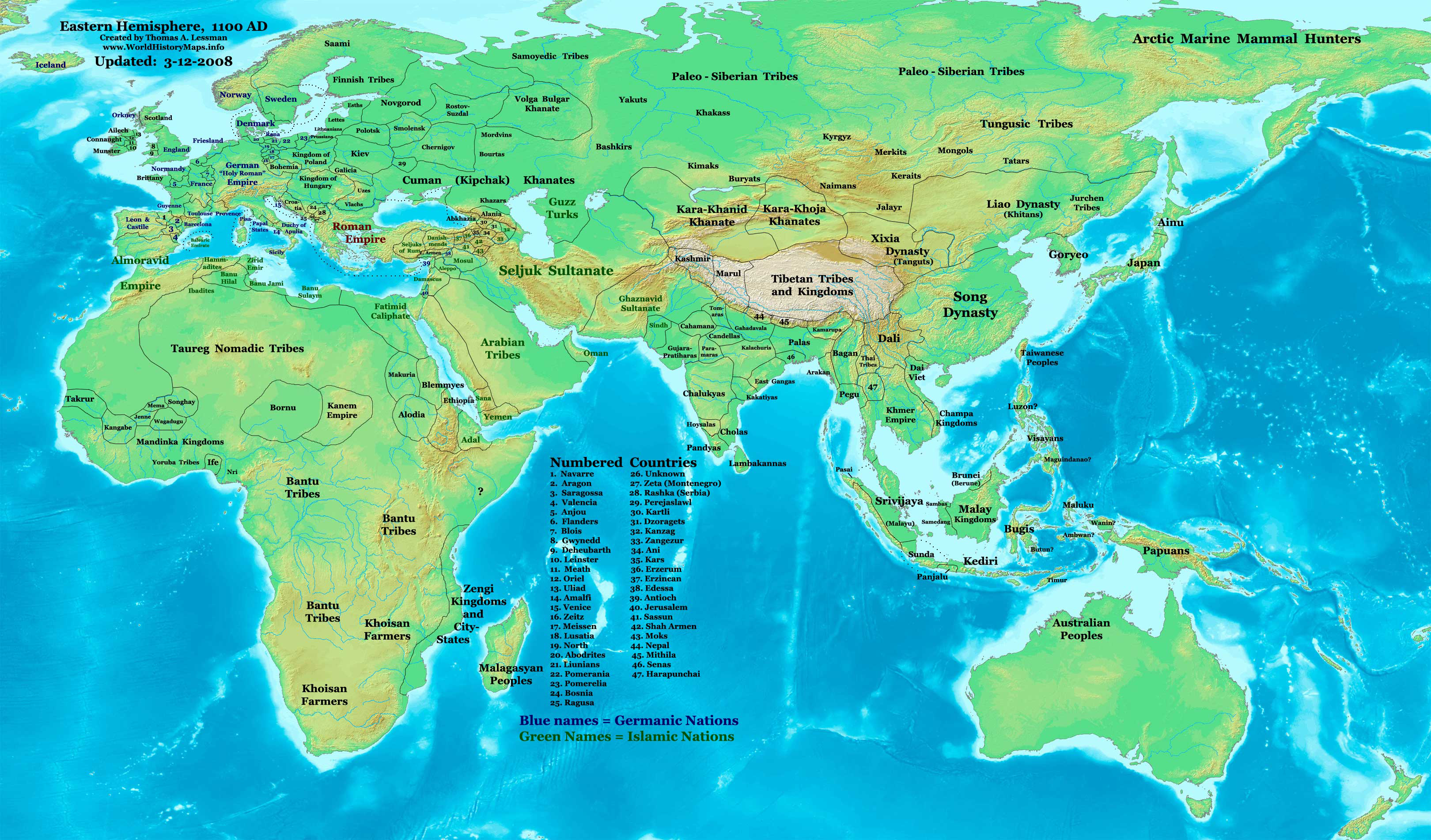
Eastern Hemisphere at the beginning of the 12th century

The 12th century is the period from 1101 to 1200 in accordance with the Julian calendar. In the history of European culture, this period is considered part of the High Middle Ages and overlaps with what is often called the "'Golden Age' of the Cistercians". The Golden Age of Islam experienced significant development, particularly in Islamic Spain.

In Song dynasty China, an invasion by Jurchens caused a political schism of north and south. The Khmer Empire of Cambodia flourished during this century, while the Fatimids of Egypt were overtaken by the Ayyubid dynasty. Following the expansions of the Ghaznavids and Ghurid Empire, the Muslim conquests in the Indian subcontinent took place at the end of the century.

== Events ==
=== 1101–1109 ===
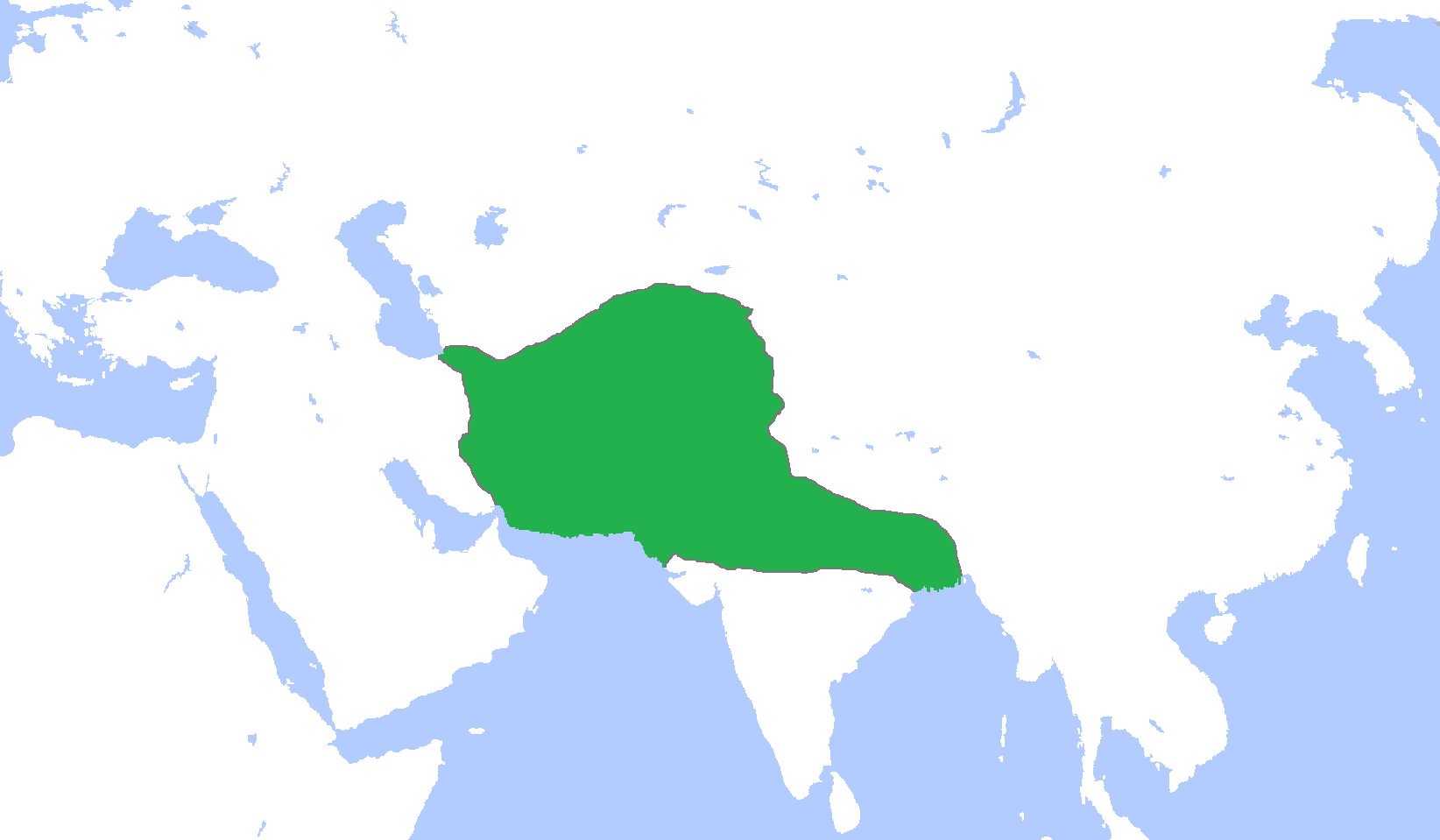
The Ghurid Empire converted to Islam from Buddhism.

- 1101: In July, the Treaty of Alton is signed between Henry I of England and his older brother Robert, Duke of Normandy in which Robert agrees to recognize Henry as king of England in exchange for a yearly stipend and other concessions. The agreement temporarily ends a crisis in the succession of the Anglo-Norman kings.
- 1101–1103: David the Builder takes over Kakheti and Hereti (now parts of Georgia).
- 1102: King Coloman unites Hungary and Croatia under the Hungarian Crown.
- 1102: Muslims conquer Señorío de Valencia.
- 1103–1104: A church council is convened by King David the Builder in Urbnisi to reorganize the Georgian Orthodox Church.
- 1104: In the Battle of Ertsukhi, King David the Builder defeats an army of Seljuks.
- 1104: King Jayawarsa of Kadiri (on Java) ascends to the throne.
- 1106: Battle of Tinchebray.
- 1107–1111: Sigurd I of Norway becomes the first Norwegian king to embark on a crusade to the Holy Land. He fights in Lisbon and on various Mediterranean isles and helps the King of Jerusalem to take Sidon from the Muslims.
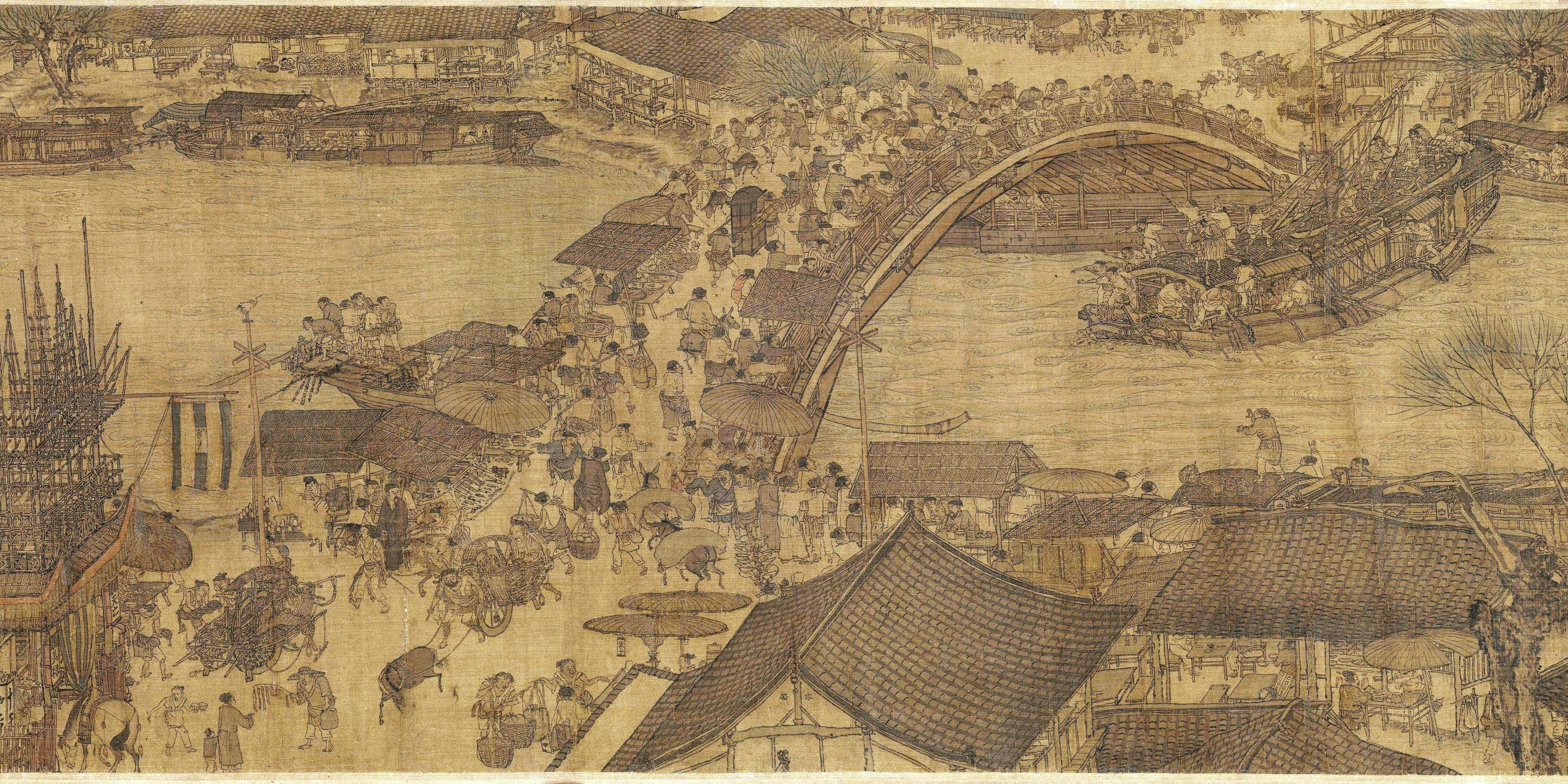
  Zhang Zeduan's painting Along the River During the Qingming Festival captures the daily life of people from the Song dynasty at the capital, Bianjing, today's Kaifeng.
- 1108: By the Treaty of Devol, signed in September, Bohemond I of Antioch has to submit to the Byzantine Empire, becoming the vassal of Alexius I.
- 1109: On June 10, Bertrand of Toulouse captures the County of Tripoli (northern Lebanon/western Syria).
- 1109: In the Battle of Nakło, Boleslaus III Wrymouth defeats the Pomeranians and re-establishes Polish access to the sea.
- 1109: On August 24, in the Battle of Hundsfeld, Boleslaus III Wrymouth defeats Emperor Henry V of Germany and stops German expansion eastward.

=== 1110s ===
- 1111: On April 14, during Henry V's first expedition to Rome, he is crowned Holy Roman Emperor.
- 1113: Paramavishnulok is crowned as King Suryavarman II in Cambodia. He expands the Khmer Empire and builds Angkor Wat during the first half of the century. He establishes diplomatic relations with China.
- 1115: The Georgian army occupies Rustavi in the war with the Muslims.
- 1115: In Java, King Kamesvara of Kadiri ascends to the throne. Janggala ceases to exist and comes under Kadiri domination, highly possible under royal marriage. During his reign, Mpu Dharmaja writes Kakawin Smaradahana, a eulogy for the king which become the inspiration for the Panji cycle tales, which spread across Southeast Asia.
- 1116: The Byzantine army defeats the Turks at Philomelion.
- 1116: Death of doña Jimena Díaz, governor of Valencia from 1099 to 1102.
- c. 1119: The Knights Templar are founded to protect Christian pilgrims in Jerusalem.

=== 1120s ===
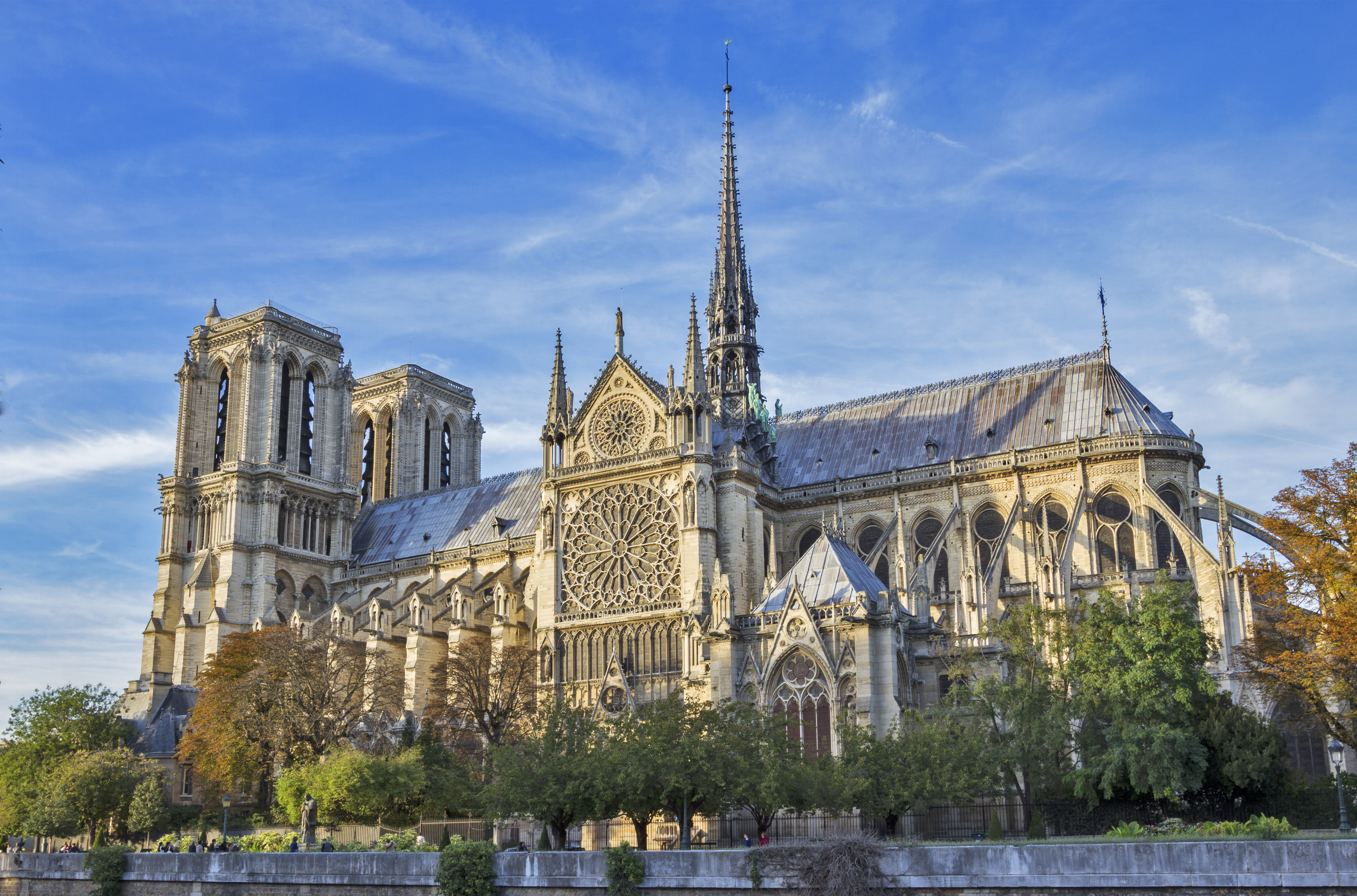
The Cathedral of Notre-Dame de Paris (built between 1163 and 1260)

- 1120: On January 16, the Council of Nablus, a council of ecclesiastic and secular lords in the crusader Kingdom of Jerusalem, establishes the first written laws for the kingdom.
- 1120: On November 25, William Adelin, the only legitimate son of King Henry I of England, drowns in the White Ship Disaster, leading to a succession crisis which will bring down the Norman monarchy of England.
- 1121: On August 12, in the Battle of Didgori, the greatest military victory in Georgian history, King David the Builder with 45,000 Georgians, 15,000 Kipchak auxiliaries, 500 Alan mercenaries and 100 French Crusaders defeats a much larger Seljuk-led Muslim coalition army.
- 1121: On December 25, St. Norbert and 29 companions make their solemn vows in Premontre, France, establishing the Premonstratensian Order.
- 1122: The Battle of Beroia (Modern-day Stara Zagora, Bulgaria) results in the disappearance of the Pechenegs Turkish tribe as an independent force.
- 1122: On September 23, the Concordat of Worms (Pactum Calixtinum) is drawn up between Emperor Henry V and Pope Calixtus II bringing an end to the first phase of the power struggle between the papacy and the Holy Roman Empire.
- 1122: King David the Builder captures Tbilisi and declares it the capital city of Georgia, ending 400 years of Arab rule.
- 1123: The Jurchen dynasty of China forces Koryo (now Korea) to recognize their suzerainty.
- 1124: In April or May, David I is crowned King of the Scots.
- 1125: On June 11, in the Battle of Azaz, the Crusader states, led by King Baldwin II of Jerusalem, defeat the Seljuk Turks.
- 1125: In November, the Jurchens of the Jin dynasty declare war on the Song dynasty, beginning the Jin–Song wars.
- 1125: Lothair of Supplinburg, duke of Saxony, is elected Holy Roman Emperor instead of the nearest heir, Frederick of Swabia, beginning the great struggle between Guelphs and Ghibellines.
- 1127: The Northern Song dynasty loses power over northern China to the Jin dynasty.
- 1128: On June 24, the Kingdom of Portugal gains independence from the Kingdom of León at the Battle of São Mamede; (recognised by León in 1143).

=== 1130s ===
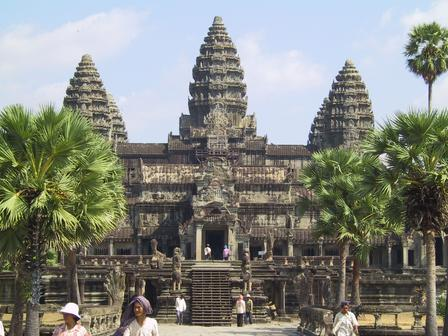
The temple complex of Angkor Wat, built during the reign of Suryavarman II in Cambodia of the Khmer Era.

- 1130–1180: 50-year drought in what is now the American Southwest.
- 1130–1138: Papal schism, Pope Innocent II vs. Antipope Anacletus II.
- 1130: On March 26, Sigurd I of Norway dies. A golden era of 95 years comes to an end for Norway as civil wars between the members of Harald Fairhair's family line rage for the remainder of the century.
- 1130: On Christmas Day, Roger II is crowned King of Sicily, the royal title being bestowed on him by Antipope Anacletus II.
- 1132: The Southern Song dynasty establishes China's first permanent standing navy, although China had a long naval history prior. The main admiral's office is at the port of Dinghai.
- 1132–1183: the Chinese navy increases from a mere 3,000 to 52,000 marine soldiers stationed in 20 different squadrons. During this time, hundreds of treadmill-operated paddle wheel craft are assembled for the navy to fight the Jin dynasty in the north.
- 1135: King Jayabaya of Kadiri ascends to the throne.
- 1135–1154: The Anarchy takes place, during a period of civil war in England.
- 1136: Suger begins rebuilding the abbey church at St Denis north of Paris, which is regarded as the first major Gothic building.
- 1137: On July 22, the future King Louis VII of France marries Eleanor, the Duchess of Aquitaine.
- 1137: Egyptian military commander Ridwan ibn Walakhshi becomes vizier of Egypt.
- 1138: On October 11, the 1138 Aleppo earthquake devastates much of northern Syria.
- 1139: in April, the Second Lateran Council ends the papal schism.
- 1139: On July 5, in the Treaty of Mignano, Pope Innocent II confirms Roger II as King of Sicily, Duke of Apulia, and Prince of Capua and invests him with his titles.
- 1139: On July 25, the Portuguese defeat the Almoravids led by Ali ibn Yusuf in the Battle of Ourique; Prince Afonso Henriques is acclaimed King of Portugal by his soldiers.

=== 1140s ===
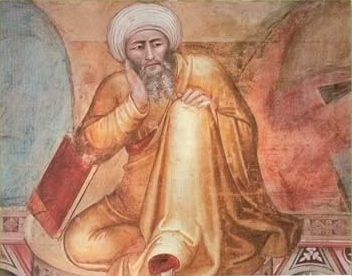
Averroes in a 14th-century painting by Andrea di Bonaiuto

- 1140–1150: Collapse of the Ancestral Puebloan culture at Chaco Canyon (modern-day New Mexico).
- 1141: The Treaty of Shaoxing ends the conflict between the Jin dynasty and Southern Song dynasty, legally establishing the boundaries of the two countries and forcing the Song dynasty to renounce all claims to its former territories north of the Huai River. The treaty reduces the Southern Song into a quasi-tributary state of the Jurchen Jin dynasty.
- 1143: Manuel I Komnenos is crowned as Byzantine emperor after the death of John II Komnenos.
- 1143: Afonso Henriques is proclaimed King of Portugal by the cortes.
- 1143: The Treaty of Zamora recognizes Portuguese independence from the Kingdom of León. Portugal also recognizes the suzerainty of the pope.
- 1144: On December 24, Edessa falls to the Atabeg Zengi.
- 1145–1148: The Second Crusade is launched in response to the fall of the County of Edessa.
- 1147: On October 25, the four-month-long Siege of Lisbon successfully brings the city under definitive Portuguese control, expelling the Moorish overlords.
- 1147: A new Berber dynasty, the Almohads, led by Emir Abd al-Mu'min, takes North Africa from the Almoravides and soon invades the Iberian Peninsula. The Almohads began as a religious movement to rid Islam of impurities.
- 1147: The Wendish Crusade against the Polabian Slavs (or "Wends") in what is now northern and eastern Germany.

=== 1150s ===
Henry II's continental holdings in 1154, showing the lands known as the Angevin Empire in shades of red.

- 1150: Ramon Berenguer IV, Count of Barcelona marries Petronilla, the Queen of Aragon.
- 1151: The Treaty of Tudilén is signed by Alfonso VII of León and Raymond Berengar IV, Count of Barcelona, recognizing the Aragonese conquests south of the Júcar and the right to expand in and annex the Kingdom of Murcia.
- 1153: The Treaty of Wallingford, ends the civil war between Empress Matilda and her cousin King Stephen of England fought over the English crown. Stephen acknowledges Matilda's son Henry of Anjou as heir.
- 1153: The First Treaty of Constance is signed between Emperor Frederick I and Pope Eugene III, by the terms of which, the emperor is to prevent any action by Manuel I Comnenus to reestablish the Byzantine Empire on Italian soil and to assist the pope against his enemies in revolt in Rome.
- 1154: the Moroccan-born Muslim geographer Muhammad al-Idrisi publishes his Geography.
- 1154: On December 27, Henry II is crowned King of England at Westminster Abbey.
- 1155: Pope Adrian IV grants overlordship of Ireland to Henry II of England in the bull Laudabiliter.
- 1156: On June 18, the Treaty of Benevento is entered into by Pope Adrian IV and the Norman Kingdom of Sicily. After years of turbulent relations, the popes finally settles down to peace with the Hauteville kings. The kingship of William I is recognized over all Sicily, Apulia, Calabria, Campania, and Capua. The tribute to the pope of 600 schifati agreed upon by Roger II in 1139 at Mignano is affirmed and another 400 shift is added for the new lands.
- 1158: The Treaty of Sahagún ends the war between Castile and León.

=== 1160s ===
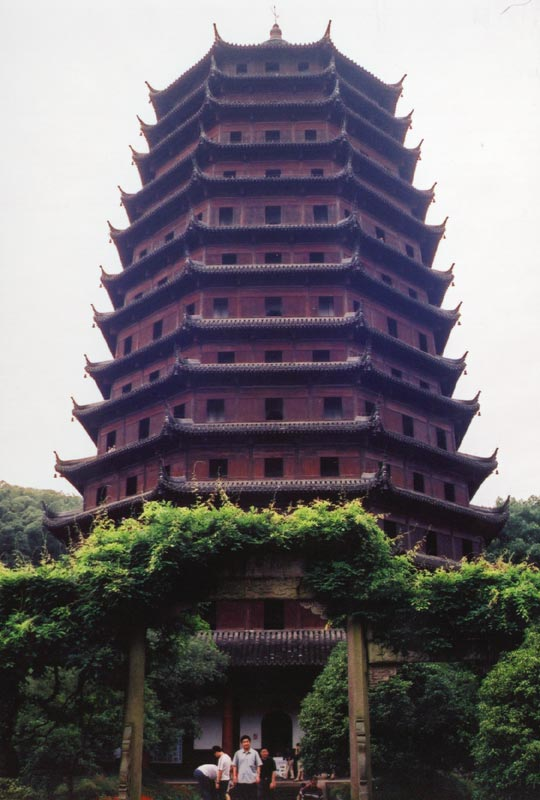
The Liuhe Pagoda of Hangzhou, China, 1165

- 1161: the Song dynasty Chinese navy, employing gunpowder bombs launched from trebuchets, defeats the enormous Jin dynasty navy in the East China Sea in the Battle of Tangdao and on the Yangtze River in the Battle of Caishi.
- 1161: Kilij Arslan II, Sultan of Rum, makes peace with the Byzantine Empire, recognizing the emperor's primacy.
- 1161: In the siege of Ani, troops from the Kingdom of Georgia take control over the city, only to have it sold for the second time to the Shaddadids, a Kurdish dynasty.
- 1162: Genghis Khan, the founder of the Mongol Empire, is born as Temüjin in present-day Mongolia.
- 1162: Egyptian military commander Shawar becomes vizier and de facto Caliph of the Fatimid Caliphate of Egypt.
- 1163: The Norwegian Law of Succession takes effect.
- 1165–1182: Tensions and disputes between the Pagan Empire and the Kingdom of Polonnaruwa causes the Sinhalese under Parakramabahu the Great to raid Burma.
- 1168: King Valdemar I of Denmark conquers Arkona on the Island of Rügen, the strongest pagan fortress and temple in northern Europe.
- 1169: Political disputes within the Pandya Empire sparks the decade-long Pandyan Civil War.
- 1169: On May 1, the Norman invasion of Ireland begins. Richard fitzGilbert de Clare ('Strongbow') allies with the exiled Irish chief, Dermot MacMurrough, to help him recover his kingdom of Leinster.

=== 1170s ===
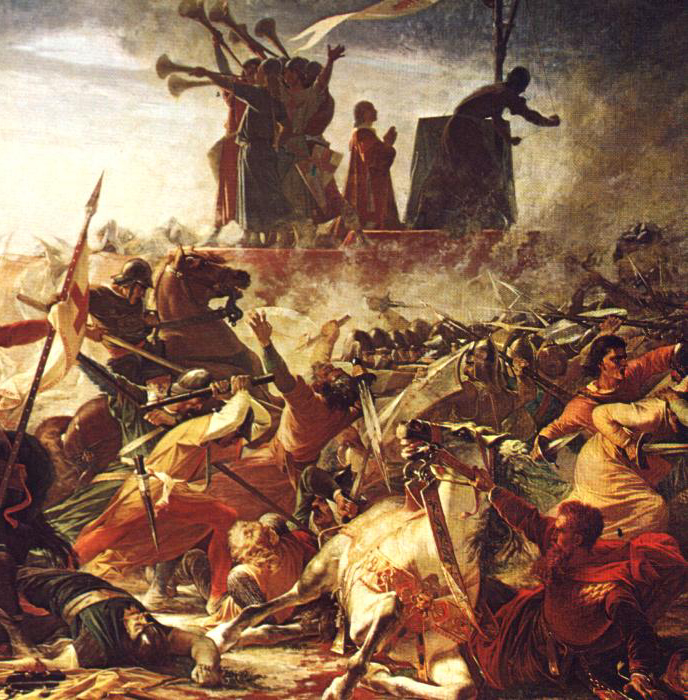
The defense of the Carroccio during the battle of Legnano (1176) by Amos Cassioli (1832–1891)

- 1170: The Treaty of Sahagún is signed by Alfonso VIII of Castile and Alfonso II of Aragon. Based on the terms of the accord, Alfonso VIII agrees to provide Alfonso II with three hostages, to be used as tribute payments owed by Ibn Mardanīš of Valencia and Murcia.
- 1170: On December 29, Thomas Becket is murdered in Canterbury Cathedral.
- 1171: Saladin deposes the last Fatimid Caliph Al-'Āḍid and establishes the Ayyubid dynasty, becoming the first Sultan of Egypt. Egypt remains an autonomous state.
- 1171: On November 11, Henry II of England lands in Ireland to assert his claim as Lord of Ireland.
- 1172: The Pandyan city of Madurai is sacked by the Sinhalese army due to an attempt to drive off the rival throne claimant, Kulasekara Pandyan.
- 1173: Sinhalese king Parakramabahu the Great gains a decisive victory by invading the Chola Empire as an ally of the Pandyas in the Pandyan Civil War.
- 1174: On July 12, William I of Scotland is captured by the English in the Battle of Alnwick. He accepts the feudal overlordship of the English crown and pays ceremonial allegiance at York.
- 1175: Hōnen Shōnin (Genkū) founds the Jōdo shū (Pure Land) sect of Buddhism.
- 1175: The Treaty of Windsor is signed by King Henry II of England and the High King of Ireland, Ruaidrí Ua Conchobair.
- 1176: On May 29, Frederick Barbarossa's forces are defeated in the Battle of Legnano by the Lombard League which results in the emperor's acknowledgment of the pope's sovereignty over the Papal States and Alexander acknowledging the emperor's overlordship of the imperial Church.
- 1176: On September 17, The Battle of Myriokephalon (Myriocephalum; Turkish: Miryakefalon Savaşı) is fought between the Byzantine Empire and the Seljuk Turks in Phrygia. It is a serious reversal for the Byzantine forces and will be the final, unsuccessful, effort by the Byzantines to recover the interior of Anatolia from the Seljuk Turks.
- 1177: The Treaty or Peace of Venice is signed by the papacy and its allies, and Frederick I, Holy Roman Emperor. The Norman Kingdom of Sicily also participates in negotiations and the treaty thereby determines the political course of all of Italy for the next several years.
- 1178: Chinese writer Zhou Qufei, a Guangzhou customs officer, writes of an island far west in the Indian Ocean (possibly Madagascar), from where people with skin "as black as lacquer" and with frizzy hair were captured and purchased as slaves by Arab merchants.
- 1179: The Treaty of Cazola (Cazorla) is signed by Alfonso II of Aragon and Alfonso VIII of Castile, dividing Andalusia into separate zones of conquest for the two kingdoms, so that the work of the Reconquista would not be stymied by internecine feuding.

=== 1180s ===
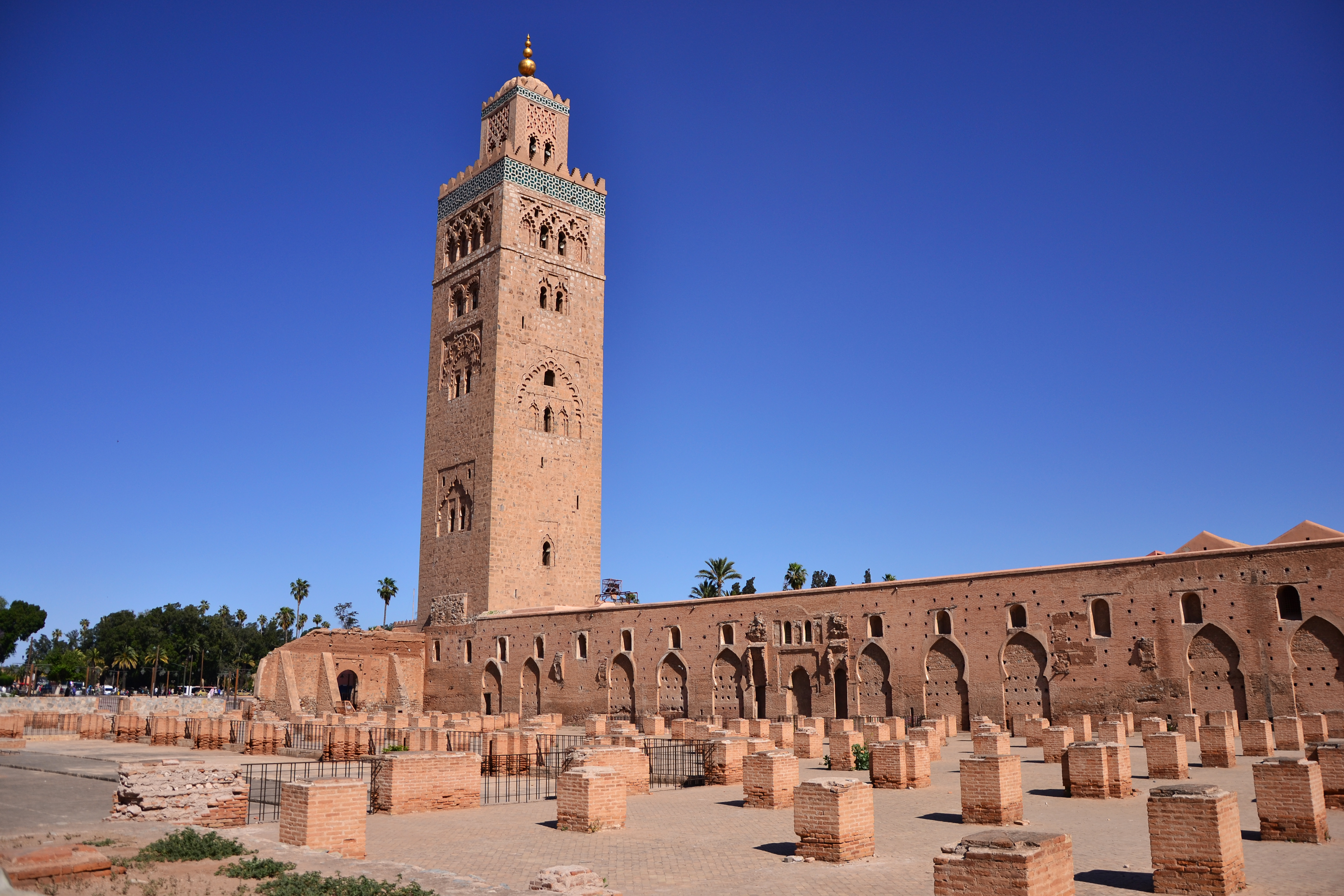
The Kutubiyya Mosque in Marrakesh, founded by the Almohad caliph Abd al-Mu'min

- 1180: The Portuguese Navy defeats a Muslim fleet off the coast of Cape Espichel.
- 1180–1185: the Genpei War in Japan.
- 1181: Parakramabahu the Great conducts a large-scale raid on Burma, after a ship transporting a Sinhalese princess to the Khmer Empire is attacked by Burmese naval fleets.
- 1182: Religious reformations of Theravada Buddhism in Pagan Burma under the patronage of Narapatisithu are continued with the end of the Polonnaruwa-Pagan War.
- 1182: Revolt of the people of Constantinople against the Latins, whom they massacre, proclaiming Andronicus I Comnenus as co-emperor.
- 1183: On January 25, the final Peace of Constance between Frederick Barbarossa, the pope and the Lombard towns is signed, confirming the Peace of Venice of 1177.
- 1183: On September 24, Andronicus I Comnenus has his nephew Alexius II Comnenus strangled.
- 1184: On March 24, Queen Tamar, King of Georgia, accedes to the throne as sole ruler after reigning with her father, George III, for six years.
- 1184: Diet of Pentecost organised by Emperor Frederick I in Mainz.
- 1185: The Uprising of Asen and Peter against the Byzantine Empire leads to the restoration of the Bulgarian Empire.
- 1185: Andronicus I Comnenus is deposed and, on September 12, executed as a result of the Norman massacre of the Greeks of Thessalonika.
- 1185: The cathedral school (Katedralskolan) in Lund, Sweden, is founded. The school is the oldest in northern Europe and one of the oldest in all of Europe.
- 1185: Beginning in this year the Kamakura shogunate deprives the emperor of Japan of political power.
- 1186: On January 27, the future Holy Roman Emperor Henry VI marries Constance of Sicily, the heiress to the Sicilian throne.
- 1187: On July 4, in the Battle of Hattin, Saladin defeats the king of Jerusalem.
- 1187: In August, the Swedish royal and commercial center Sigtuna is attacked by raiders from Karelia, Couronia, and/or Estonia.
- 1188: The Riah were introduced into the Habt and south of Tetouan by the Almohad caliph, Abu Yusuf Yaqub al-Mansur, and Jochem and Acem were introduced in Tamesna.
- 1189: On September 3, Richard I is crowned King of England at Westminster.
- 1189: On November 11, William II of Sicily dies and is succeeded by his illegitimate cousin Tancred, Count of Lecce instead of Constance.
- 1189–1192: The Third Crusade is an attempt by European leaders to wrest the Holy Land from Saladin.

=== 1190–1200 ===
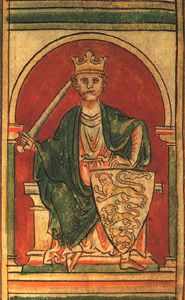
Richard I of England, or Richard the Lionheart.

- 1190: On June 10, Emperor Frederick Barbarossa drowns in the River Salef, leaving the Crusader army under the command of the rivals Philip II of France and Richard I of England, which ultimately leads to the dissolution of the army.
- 1191: Holy Roman Emperor Henry VI attacked the Kingdom of Sicily from May to August but fails and withdrawn, with Empress Constance captured (released 1192).
- 1191: On September 7, Saladin is defeated by Richard I of England at the Battle of Arsuf.
- 1192: In April, Isabella I begins her reign as Christian Queen of the Kingdom of Jerusalem
- 1192: In the Battle of Jaffa, King Richard the Lionheart defeats Saladin.
- 1192: In June, the Treaty of Ramla is signed by Saladin and Richard Lionheart. Under the terms of the agreement, Jerusalem will remain under Muslim control. However, the city will be open to Christian pilgrims. The Latin Kingdom is reduced to a coastal strip that extends from Tyre to Jaffa.
- 1192: Minamoto no Yoritomo is appointed Sei-i Taishōgun, "barbarian-subduing great general", shōgun for short, the first military dictator to bear this title.
- 1192: Sultan Shahābuddin Muhammad Ghori establishes the first Muslim empire in India for 14 years (1192–1206) by defeating Prithviraj Chauhan.
- 1193: Nalanda, the great Indian Buddhist educational centre, is destroyed.
- 1194: Emperor Henry VI conquers the Kingdom of Sicily.
- 1195: On June 16, the struggle of Shamqori. Georgian forces annihilate the army of Abu Baqar.
- 1198: The brethren of the Crusader hospital in Acre are raised to a military order of knights, the Teutonic Knights, formally known as the Order of the Knights of the Hospital of St. Mary of the Teutons in Jerusalem.
- 1198: Archbishop Saint Sava of Serbia and Serbian Great Prince Stefan Nemanja founded Serbian Orthodox Hilandar monastery in Mount Athos, Greece. Its oldest Serbian hospital and university. Eastern Roman Emperor Alexios III Angelos (1195–1203) issued a golden sealed chrysobull donating, "[...] to the Serbs as an eternal gift [...]," thereby designating it, "to serve the purpose of accepting the people of Serb descent, who seek to pursue the monastic way of life.
- 1199: Pope Innocent III writes to Kaloyan, inviting him to unite the Bulgarian Church with the Roman Catholic Church.
- 1200: Construction begins on the Grand Village of the Natchez near Natchez, Mississippi. This ceremonial center for the Natchez people is occupied and built until the early 17th century.

=== Undated ===
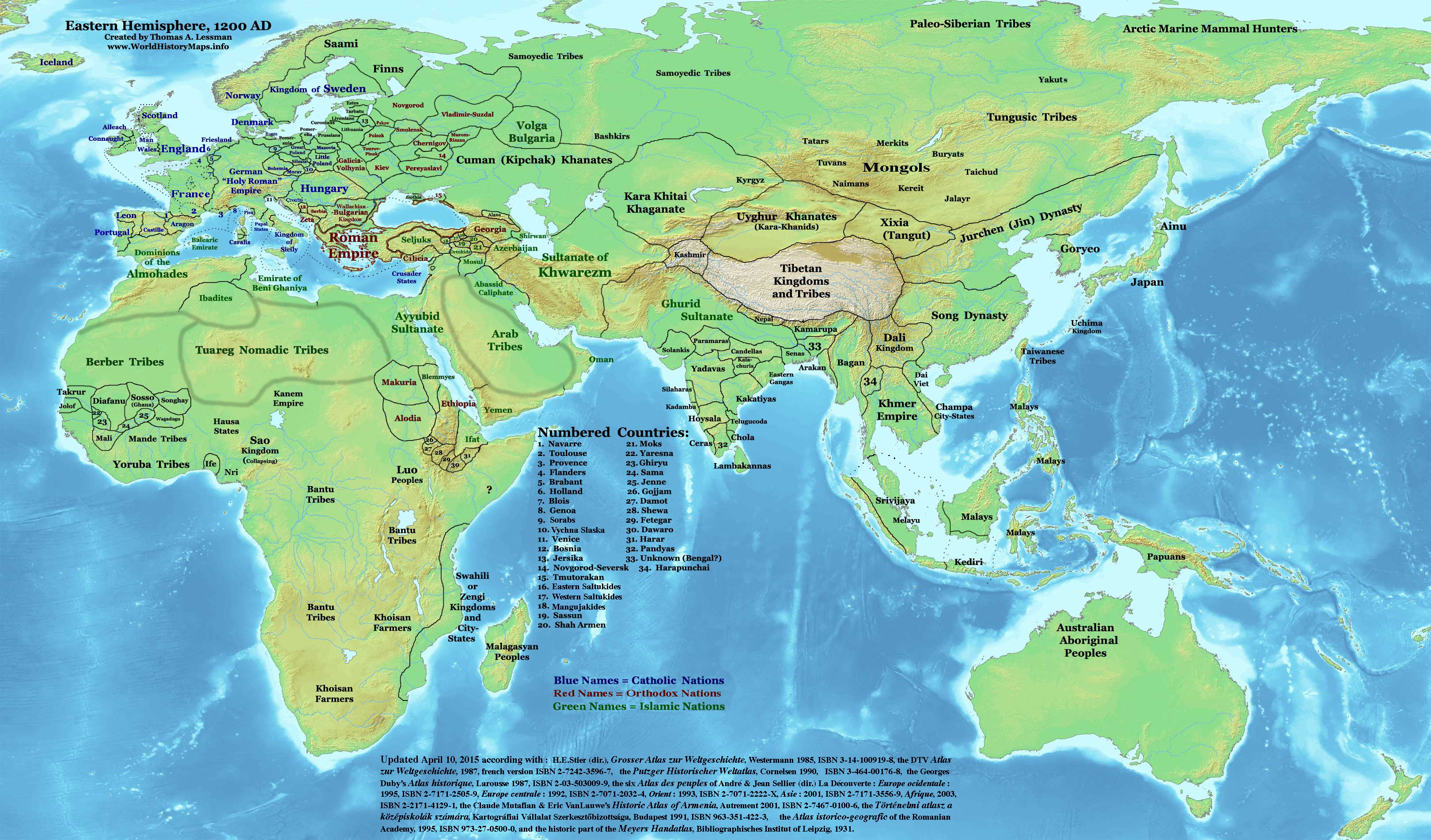
Eastern Hemisphere at the end of the 12th century

- China is under the Northern Song dynasty. Early in the century, Zhang Zeduan paints Along the River During the Qingming Festival. It will later end up in the Palace Museum, Beijing.
- In southeast Asia, there is conflict between the Khmer Empire and the Champa. Angkor Wat is built under the Hindu king Suryavarman II. By the end of the century, the Buddhist Jayavarman VII becomes the ruler.
- Japan is in its Heian period. The Chōjū-jinbutsu-giga is made and attributed to Toba Sōjō. It ends up at the Kōzan-ji, Kyoto.
- In Oceania, the Tuʻi Tonga Empire expands to a much greater area.
- Europe undergoes the Renaissance of the 12th century. The blast furnace for the smelting of cast iron is attested in Lapphyttan in Sweden as early as 1150.
- Alexander Neckam is the first European to document the mariner's compass, first documented by Shen Kuo during the previous century.
- Christian humanism becomes a self-conscious philosophical tendency in Europe. Christianity is also introduced to Estonia, Finland, and Karelia.
- The first medieval universities are founded. Pierre Abelard teaches.
- Middle English begins to develop, and literacy begins to spread outside the Church throughout Europe. In addition, churchmen are increasingly willing to take on secular roles. By the end of the century, at least a third of England's bishops also act as royal judges in secular matters.
- The Ars antiqua period in the history of the medieval music of Western Europe begins.
- The earliest recorded miracle play is performed in Dunstable, England.
- Gothic architecture and trouvère music begin in France.
- During the middle of the century, the Cappella Palatina is built in Palermo, Sicily, and the Madrid Skylitzes manuscript illustrates the Synopsis of Histories by John Skylitzes.
- Fire and plague insurance first become available in Iceland, and the first documented outbreaks of influenza there happens.
- The medieval state of Serbia is formed by Stefan Nemanja and then continued by the Nemanjić dynasty.
- By the end of the century, both the Capetian dynasty and the House of Anjou are relying primarily on mercenaries in their militaries. Paid soldiers are available year-round, unlike knights who expected certain periods off to maintain their manor lifestyles.
- In India, Hoysala architecture reaches its peak.
- In the Middle East, the icon of Theotokos of Vladimir is painted probably in Constantinople. Everything but the faces will later be retouched, and the icon will go to the Tretyakov Gallery of Moscow.
- The Georgian poet Shota Rustaveli composes his epic poem The Knight in the Panther's Skin.
- Shahab al-Din Suhrawardi founds his "school of illumination".
- In North Africa, the kasbah of Marrakesh is built, including the city gate Bab Agnaou and the Koutoubia mosque.
- In sub-Saharan Africa, Kente cloth is first woven.
- In France, the first piedfort coins were minted.
- The city of Tula burns down, marking the end of the Toltec Empire
- In West Africa the Ife Empire is established.

== Inventions, discoveries, and introductions by year ==
- 1104: The Venice Arsenal of Venice, Italy, is founded. It employed some 16,000 people for the mass production of sailing ships in large assembly lines, hundreds of years before the Industrial Revolution.
- 1106: Finished building of Gelati.
- 1107: The Chinese engineer Wu Deren combines the mechanical compass vehicle of the south-pointing chariot with the distance-measuring odometer device.
- 1111: The Chinese Donglin Academy is founded.
- 1165: The Liuhe Pagoda of Hangzhou, China, is built.
- 1170: The Roman Catholic notion of Purgatory is defined.
- 1185: First record of windmills.

== Bibliography ==
- Warren, Wilfred Lewis (1978). King John (Revised ed.). University of California Press. ISBN 9780520036437.
