= 1183 =

1183 in various calendars
- Gregorian calendar: 1183; MCLXXXIII
- Ab urbe condita: 1936
- Armenian calendar: 632; ԹՎ ՈԼԲ
- Assyrian calendar: 5933
- Balinese saka calendar: 1104–1105
- Bengali calendar: 589–590
- Berber calendar: 2133
- English Regnal year: 29 Hen. 2 – 30 Hen. 2
- Buddhist calendar: 1727
- Burmese calendar: 545
- Byzantine calendar: 6691–6692
- Chinese calendar: 壬寅年 (Water Tiger); 3880 or 3673 — to — 癸卯年 (Water Rabbit); 3881 or 3674
- Coptic calendar: 899–900
- Discordian calendar: 2349
- Ethiopian calendar: 1175–1176
- Hebrew calendar: 4943–4944
- Hindu calendars
- Vikram Samvat: 1239–1240
- Shaka Samvat: 1104–1105
- Kali Yuga: 4283–4284
- Holocene calendar: 11183
- Igbo calendar: 183–184
- Iranian calendar: 561–562
- Islamic calendar: 578–579
- Japanese calendar: Juei 2 (寿永２年)
- Javanese calendar: 1090–1091
- Julian calendar: 1183; MCLXXXIII
- Korean calendar: 3516
- Minguo calendar: 729 before ROC 民前729年
- Nanakshahi calendar: −285
- Seleucid era: 1494/1495 AG
- Thai solar calendar: 1725–1726
- Tibetan calendar: ཆུ་ཕོ་སྟག་ལོ་ (male Water-Tiger); 1309 or 928 or 156 — to — ཆུ་མོ་ཡོས་ལོ་ (female Water-Hare); 1310 or 929 or 157

Year 1183 (MCLXXXIII) was a common year starting on Saturday of the Julian calendar.

== Events ==
=== By area ===
==== Byzantine Empire ====
- Alexios II is compelled to condemn his own mother to death. In September, Andronikos Komenos is formally proclaimed Byzantine Emperor before the crowd on the terrace of the Church of Christ of the Chalke. By the end of the month, Andronikos orders Alexios' assassination; the young emperor is strangled in secret with a bow-string and his body thrown in the Bósporos.
- Andronikos I marries Alexios II's widow, the 11-year-old Agnes of France.
- November – Andronikos makes a treaty with Venice, in which he promises a yearly indemnity as compensation for Venetian losses, during the Massacre of the Latins.

==== Europe ====
- June 25 – The Peace of Constance is signed, between Frederick Barbarossa and the Lombard League, forming the legal basis for the autonomy of the Italian city republics.
- Joseph of Exeter writes the first account of a sport resembling cricket.

==== Asia ====
===== Japan =====
- Three-year-old Emperor Go-Toba ascends to the throne of Japan, after the forced abdication of his brother Emperor Antoku, during the Genpei War.
- August 14 – Taira no Munemori and the Taira clan take the young Emperor Antoku and the three sacred treasures, and flee to western Japan to escape pursuit by the Minamoto clan (traditional Japanese date: Twenty-fifth Day of the Seventh Month of the Second Year of Juei).
- November 17 – Battle of Mizushima: The Taira Clan defeats the Minamoto Clan.

===== Near East =====
- February – Raynald of Châtillon has at least five ships freighted over the Isthmus of Suez, which he then uses to pillage the shores of the Red Sea around Jeddah.
- William of Tyre is excommunicated by the newly appointed Heraclius of Jerusalem, firmly ending their struggle for power.
- The Siege of Kerak is waged between the Ayyubids and the Crusaders, in which regent Guy of Lusignan refuses to fight.
- Saladin conquers Syria and becomes sultan.

== Births ==
- Chagatai Khan, second son of Genghis Khan, Khan of the Chagatai Khanate (d. 1241 or 1242)
- Philippa of Armenia, empress consort of Nicaea

== Deaths ==
- June 11 – Henry the Young King, son of Henry II of England (b. 1155)
- October – Alexios II Komnenos, Byzantine Emperor (b. 1167)
- November 23 – William Fitz Robert, 2nd Earl of Gloucester (b. 1116)
- Queen Gongye, Korean queen consort (b. 1109)
