= Jisho =

Jisho may refer to:

- Jishō, a Japanese era spanning from August 1177 through July 1181
- Jisho, the romanized word for dictionary in Japanese, in reference to Japanese dictionaries
- Nippo Jisho, the first dictionary of Japanese to a European language
