= Shimizu no kanja Yoshitaka =

Samurai of the late Heian period of Japan

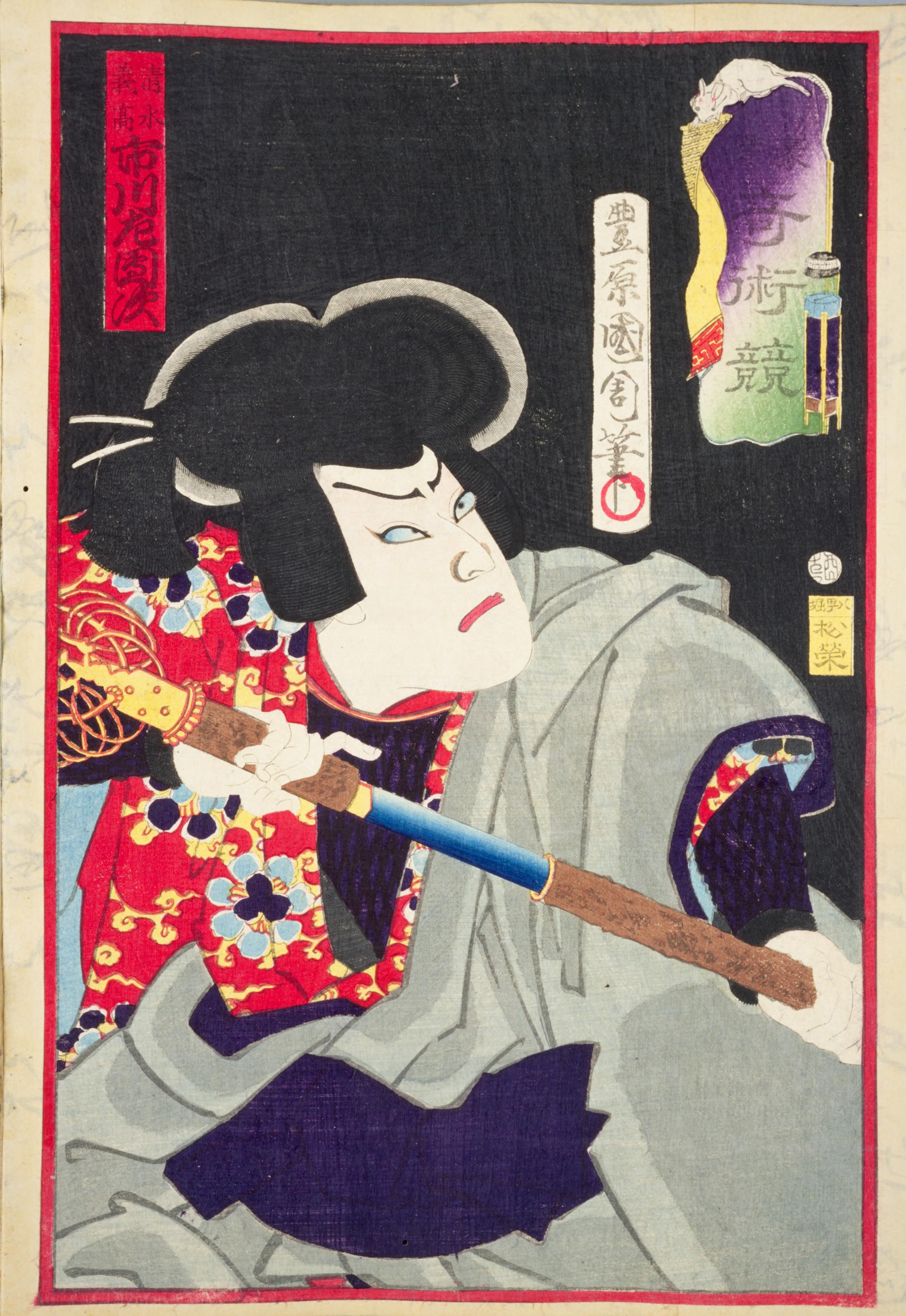
Shodai Ichikawa Sadanji as Yoshitaka by Toyohara Kunichika, in 1861

Shimizu no kanja Yoshitaka was a samurai warrior from the late Heian period of Japan. The eldest son of Yoshinaka of Kiso, Minamoto clan. In his eleventh year, he was sent to Minamoto no Yoritomo as a hostage in order to avoid the conflict between his father and Yoritomo. According to traditions, Yoshitaka fell in love with Ōhime, the eldest daughter of Yoritomo. Later years, as a result of the discord between Yoshinaka and Yoritomo, the latter defeated the former. Three month later from the killing of his father, Yoshitaka fled, but captured and executed at a riverbed of Iruma River. In later years, many works featuring Yoshitaka were made, including A Tale of Kiso Yoshitaka (or Shimizu no kanja) in Otogi-zōshi, Raigōajarikaisoden by Takizawa Bakin, and some Noh songs. Yoshitaka has been said to be handsome.

== Primary Source ==
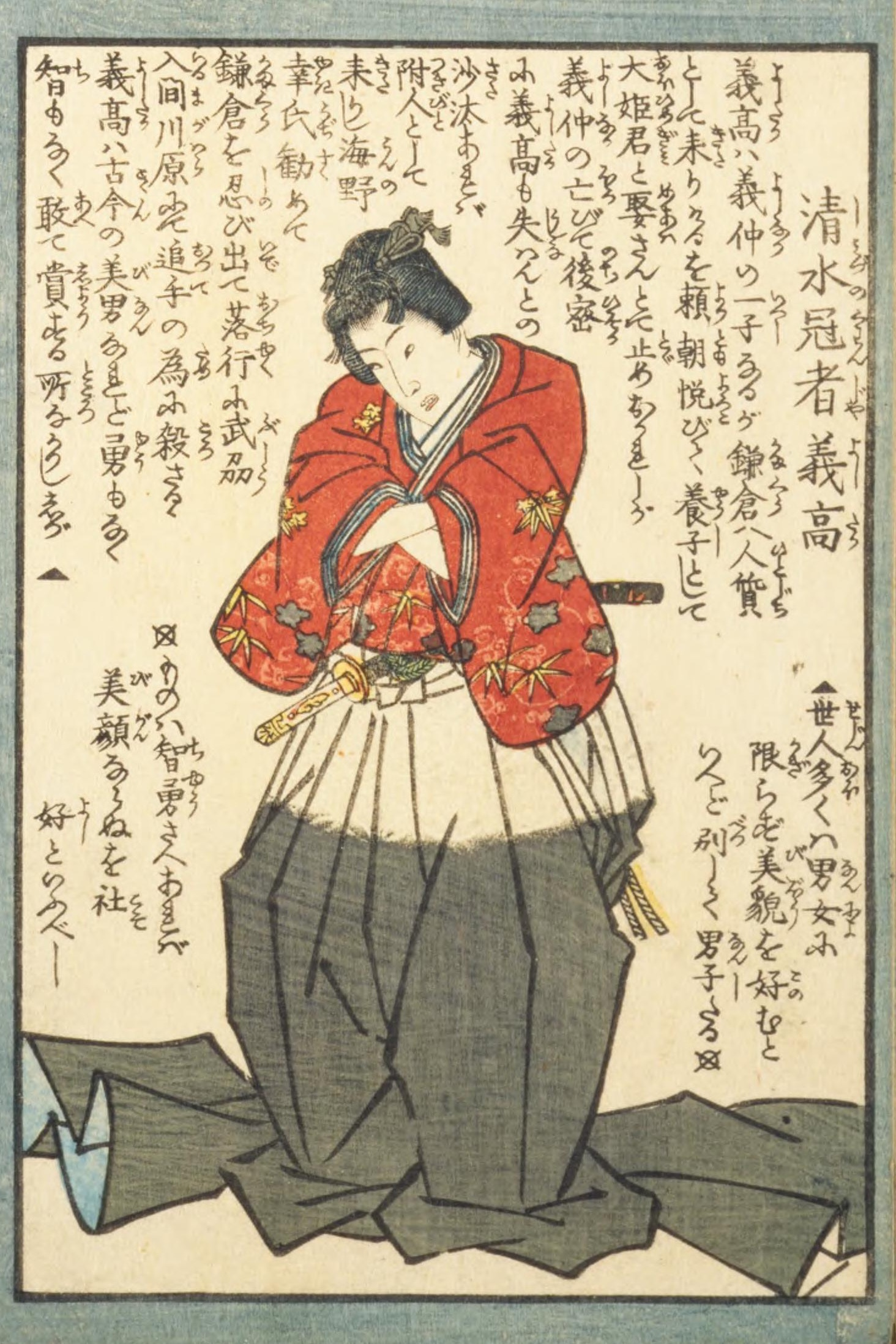
Shimizu no kanja Yoshitaka by Utagawa Yoshitora in 1859

"I heard that Kanja, the son of Yoshinaka, fled. It would not be the fact." - this is the only contemporary primary source of Yoshitaka's time. This short reference is described on an article of a winter day of the 2nd year of Juei (Note: The article was written in the fourth day of the eleventh month of the second year of Juei, that is December 19, 1183 in Julian calendar. It is in Kyoto where the writer Furuda wrote this article.) in Kikki, the diary of a noble man Furuda Tsunehisa. Yoshitaka's biographical information written in decades later are found in some historical tales and chlonologies including Azuma kagami, The Tale of the Heike, Genpei Jōsuiki.

His biographical facts are ambiguous due to lack of historical sources. Even his name is ambiguous. "Yoshitaka" is none less than the name which is called in Azuma kagami. In some version of the Tale of the Heike he is called "Shimizu no kanja Yoshishige". (Note: "Kanja" or "Kaja" means a young boy who experienced his coming-age-ceremony a while ago.) In a different version of the Tale of the Heike, he is called "Yoshimoto". In also Sompi bunmyaku, he is called "Yoshimoto". It is possible that fictitious stories are mingled with the historical sources.

== Life ==
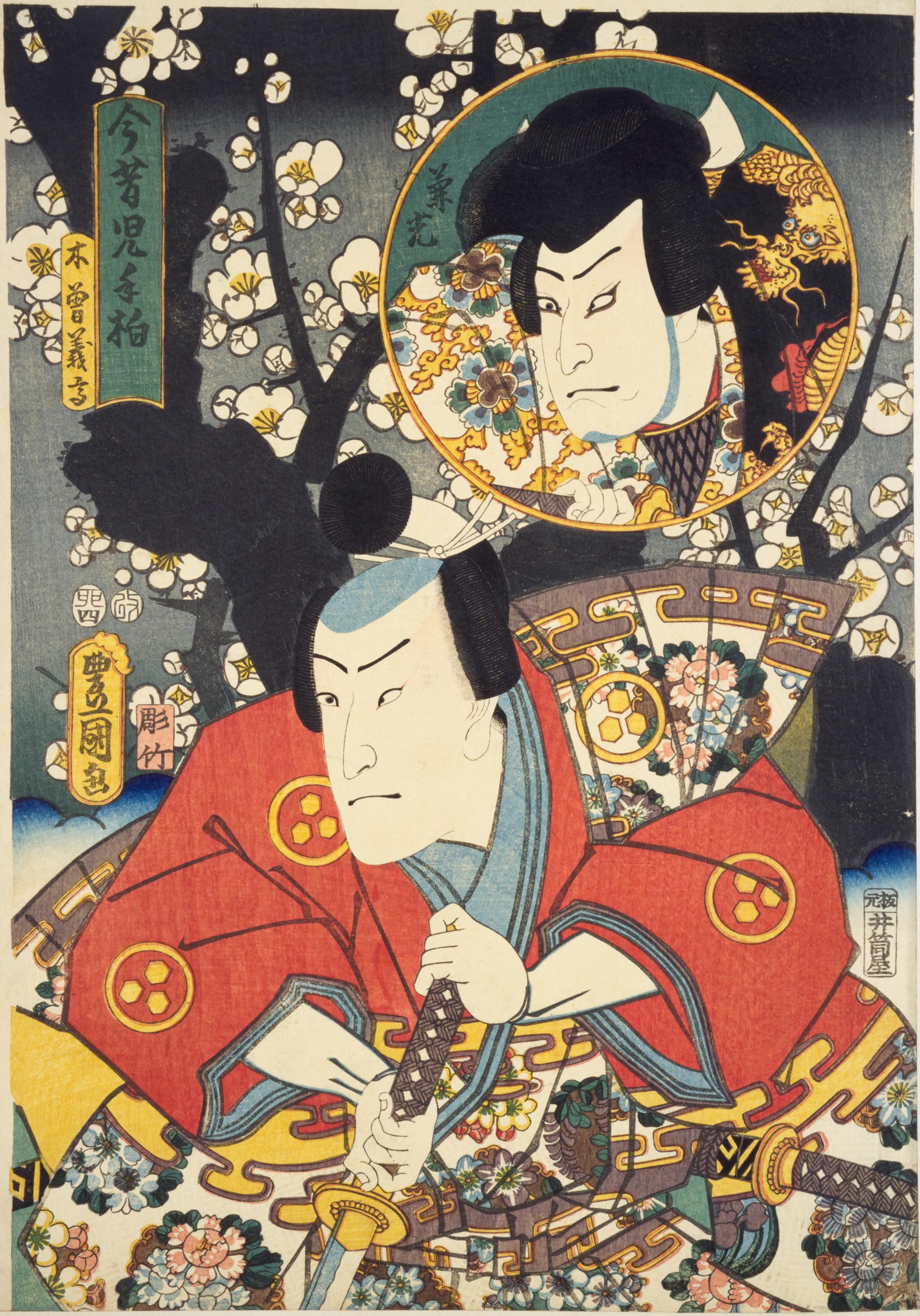
Kiso Yoshitaka and Kanemitsu by Utagawa Toyokuni III in 1855

Yoshitaka was born in around 1173, at Ōkura, Musashi. In 1180, the leaders of Minamoto clan were called to aid against Heike clan in the name of Prince Mochihito. While Yoritomo raised an army at Kamakura, Yoshitaka's father Yoshinaka also raised an army in Kiso Valley. However, the rivelry between Yoritomo and Yoshinaka was heated up because their uncle (Note: Yoritomo and Yoshinaka were cousins.) Yukiie fled into Yoshinaka from the conflict with Yoritomo. Yoshinaka decided the reconciliation with Yoritomo, considering up-coming war against Heike.

In accordance with Yoritomo's demand, Yoshinaka sent his son Yoshitaka to Kamakura as a hostage, a sign of good will, in the spring of 1183. At that time, Yoshitaka was assumed to be eleven years old in the East Asian age reckoning. He was accompanied by Umino Yukiuji, a soldier from Shinano.

Yoshitaka stayed for a year in Yoritomo's family. According to traditions, he fell in love with Ōhime, the eldest daughter of Yoritomo and Masako, and became her husband-to-be. According to one account, Yoshitaka and Ōhime married.

Next year, Yoritomo's army defeated Yoshinaka at the riverbed in Uji River (Battle of Uji (1184)) and later killed him (Battle of Awazu). Three month later after his father's killing, Yoshitaka escaped from Kamakura. According to traditions, Yoritomo ordered the assassination of Yoshitaka to his subordinate, however his order was leaked to Ōhime, and then she let Yoshitaka to be free from Kamakura. It is said that Yoshitaka's attendant Yukiuji acted as a substitute with playing sugoroku with Ōhime in order to delay the time of the exposure of Yoshitaka's absence.

Yoritomo ordered to trace of Yoshitaka. One of his subordinate Tōnai Mitsuzumi found Yoshitaka and executed him. The death place of Yoshitaka is not clearly known but it has been said to be, according to local traditions, the riverbed of Iruma River in Sayama. Hearing the assassination, Ōhime and Masako accused Yoritomo. Masako demanded Yoritomo to punish Tōnai, who was executed by Yoritomo's order. After Yoshitaka's killing, in severe grief, Ōhime declined all the plans for a marriage which his father Yoritomo brought to her. She died at her twentieth age with being unmarried.

== Works featuring Yoshitaka ==
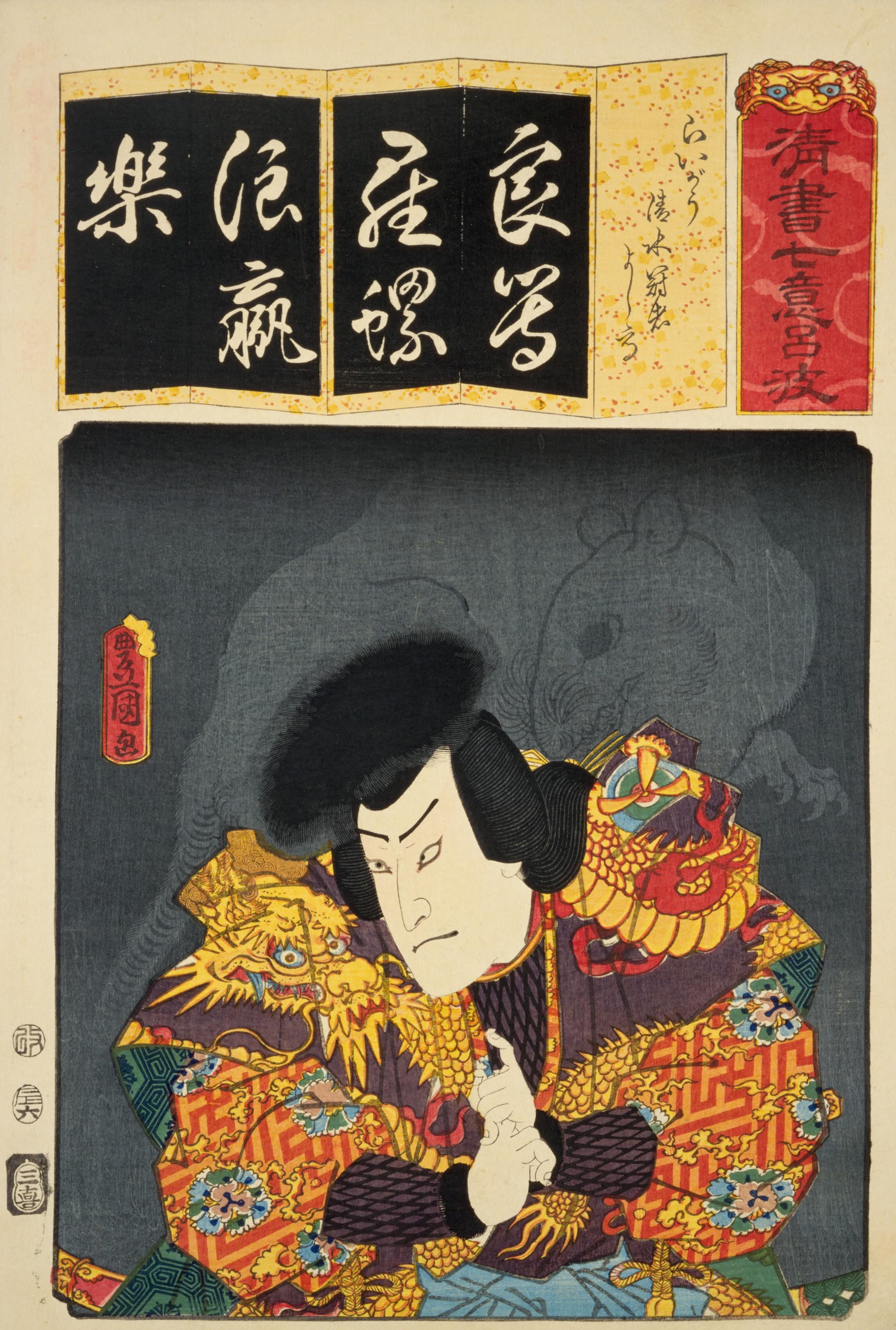
Raigō Shimizu kaja Yoshitaka by Utagawa Toyokuni III in 1856

Inspired by the love romance between Yoshitaka and Ōhime, there are many works featuring Yoshitaka, including, for example, A Tale of Kiso Yoshitaka (or Shimizu no kanja) in Otogi-zōshi, Raigōajarikaisoden by Takizawa Bakin, and some Noh songs. They are written based on historical sources like Azuma kagami. One of the Noh songs Shimizu kaja was made during Muromachi era. Yoshitaka has been interpreted to be handsome by posterity.

Raigōajarikaisoden was published in 1808. This was so popular that it was performed as kabuki at Osaka soon after the publishing. In Raigōajarikaisoden, Yoshitaka as the protagonist tries to avenge his father on Yoritomo in order to fulfill his filial duty. By the power of course, Yoshitaka is able to use magic words to employ rats to work.. However, he finally fails. It is said that the story of Raigōajarikaisoden comprises double confrontations between Yoritomo and Yoshitaka, and between cat and rat.

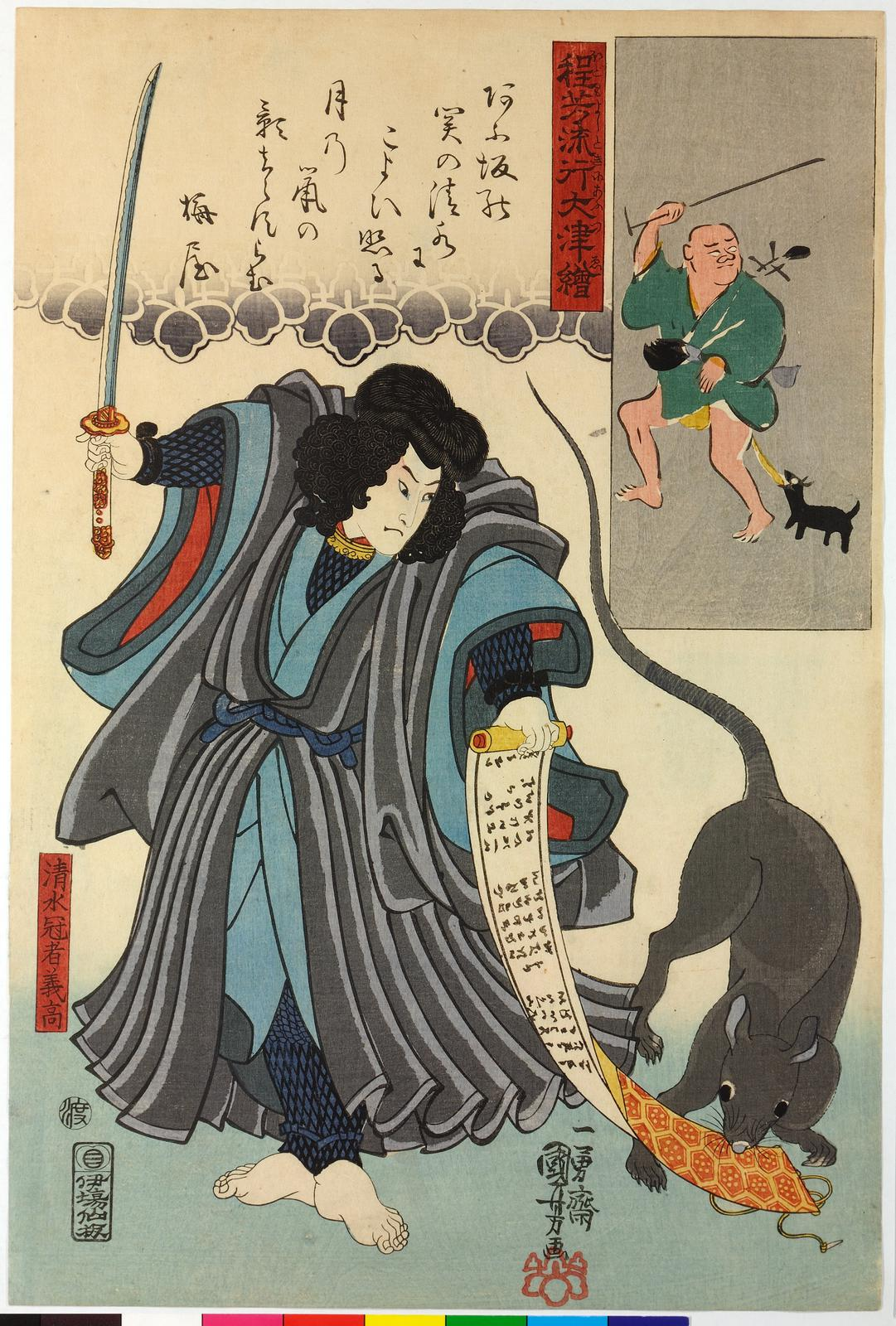
An ōtsu-e which depicts Yoshitaka, by Kuniyoshi created in 1845 or 1846
