= 1182 =

1182 in various calendars
- Gregorian calendar: 1182; MCLXXXII
- Ab urbe condita: 1935
- Armenian calendar: 631; ԹՎ ՈԼԱ
- Assyrian calendar: 5932
- Balinese saka calendar: 1103–1104
- Bengali calendar: 588–589
- Berber calendar: 2132
- English Regnal year: 28 Hen. 2 – 29 Hen. 2
- Buddhist calendar: 1726
- Burmese calendar: 544
- Byzantine calendar: 6690–6691
- Chinese calendar: 辛丑年 (Metal Ox); 3879 or 3672 — to — 壬寅年 (Water Tiger); 3880 or 3673
- Coptic calendar: 898–899
- Discordian calendar: 2348
- Ethiopian calendar: 1174–1175
- Hebrew calendar: 4942–4943
- Hindu calendars
- Vikram Samvat: 1238–1239
- Shaka Samvat: 1103–1104
- Kali Yuga: 4282–4283
- Holocene calendar: 11182
- Igbo calendar: 182–183
- Iranian calendar: 560–561
- Islamic calendar: 577–578
- Japanese calendar: Yōwa 2 / Juei 1 (寿永元年)
- Javanese calendar: 1089–1090
- Julian calendar: 1182; MCLXXXII
- Korean calendar: 3515
- Minguo calendar: 730 before ROC 民前730年
- Nanakshahi calendar: −286
- Seleucid era: 1493/1494 AG
- Thai solar calendar: 1724–1725
- Tibetan calendar: ལྕགས་མོ་གླང་ལོ་ (female Iron-Ox); 1308 or 927 or 155 — to — ཆུ་ཕོ་སྟག་ལོ་ (male Water-Tiger); 1309 or 928 or 156

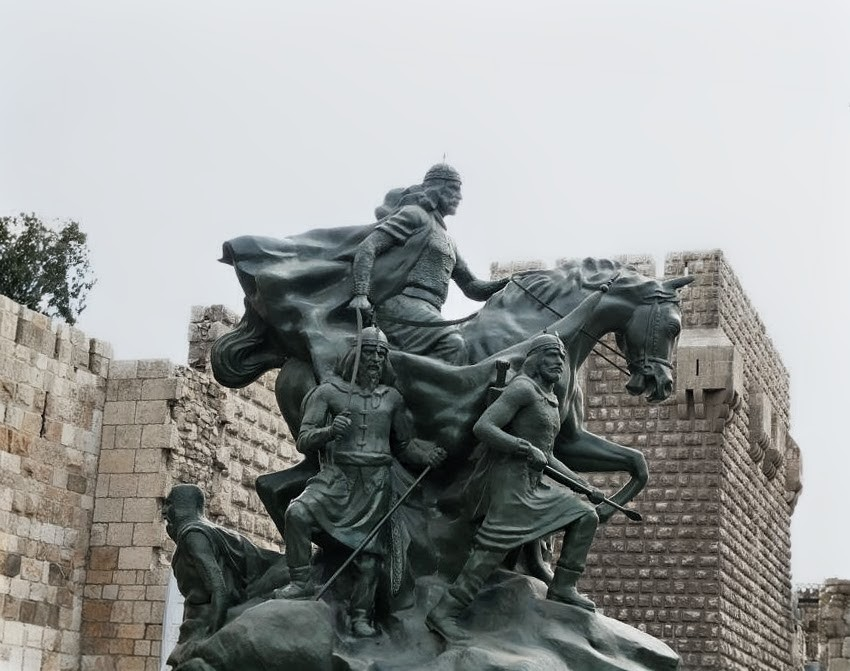
A statue of Saladin in Damascus (2008)

Year 1182 (MCLXXXII) was a common year starting on Friday of the Julian calendar.

== Events ==
=== By place ===
==== Byzantine Empire ====
- April – Massacre of the Latins: The Eastern Orthodox inhabitants of Constantinople massacre the Venetian, Genoan, and other Latin officials and traders who rule as agents of Empress Maria of Antioch. She is the mother and regent of 12-year-old Emperor Alexios II.
- August – Andronikos Komnenos, a cousin of Maria's late husband, Emperor Manuel I (Komnenos), raises an army and enters the city, representing himself as the 'protector' of Alexios. He is proclaimed as co-emperor under the name Andronikos I, and has Maria imprisoned and later condemned to be strangled – forcing a signature from Alexios to put his mother to death.

==== Levant ====
- May 11 – Saladin leads an Egyptian expeditionary force from Cairo to Syria. In June, he arrives in Damascus and learns that his nephew Farrukh Shah has raided Galilee, and sacked the villages near Mount Tabor. On his way back, Farrukh Shah attacks the fortress of Habis Jaldak, carved out of the rock above the River Yarmuk. The garrison, Christian Syrians with no great wish to die for the Crusaders, promptly surrenders.
- July – August – Battle of Belvoir Castle: Saladin crosses into Palestine round the south of the Sea of Galilee. King Baldwin IV (the Leper) of Jerusalem marches with his army back from Oultrejordain and attacks Saladin's forces near Belvoir Castle (modern Israel). In a fierce battle, the Crusaders successfully repel Saladin's invasion. At the end of the day, each side retires, claiming the victory.
- August – Saladin sends an Egyptian fleet to blockade Beirut and leads his forces in the Bekaa Valley. The city is strongly fortified and Baldwin IV rushes with his army up from Galilee – only pausing to collect the ships that lay in the harbors of Acre and Tyre. Failing to take Beirut by assault before the Crusaders arrived, Saladin breaks off the siege and withdraws.
- September – Saladin invades the Jazira Region, ending the truce between him and the Zangids. After a feint attack on Aleppo, he crosses the Euphrates. The towns of the Jazira fall before him; the cities of Edessa, Saruj and Nisibin are captured in October. Saladin presses on to Mosul, and begins the siege of the city on November 10.
- November – Al-Nasir, caliph of the Abbasid Caliphate, is shocked by the war between fellow-Muslims and tries to negotiate a peace. Saladin, thwarted by the strong fortifications of Mosul, retreats to Sinjar. He marches to conquer Diarbekir, the richest and the greatest fortress of the Jazira Region (with the finest library in Islam).
- December – Baldwin IV raids through the Hauran and reaches Bosra, while Raymond III of Tripoli recaptures Habis Jaldak. A few days later, Baldwin sets out with a Crusader force to Damascus and encamps at Dareiya in the suburbs. He decides not to attack the city and retires laden with booty, to spend Christmas at Tyre.
- Winter – Raynald of Châtillon, lord of Oultrejordain, orders the building of five ships which are carried to the Gulf of Aqaba at the northern end of the Red Sea. Part of his fleet makes a raid along the coast, threatening the security of the holy cities on Pharaoh's Island (or Île de Graye).

==== Europe ====
- Spring – King Philip II (Augustus) confiscates all the lands and buildings of the Jews and expels them from Paris. The measures are profitable in the short-term – the ransoms alone bringing in 15,000 marks and enriching Christians at the expense of Jews. Ninety-nine Jews are burned alive in Brie-Comte-Robert.
- May 12 – King Valdemar I (the Great) dies after a 28-year reign in which he has gained independence from the Holy Roman Empire. He is succeeded by his 19-year-old son Canute VI, who becomes ruler of Denmark.
- Mieszko III (the Old), duke of Greater Poland, agrees with his son Odon of Poznań to divide the territories between them: Mieszko hold his western lands and Odon receives the eastern lands south of the River Obra.
- May – June – Béla III, king of Hungary, ravages the region of Belgrade and Barancs (modern-day Braničevo). Meanwhile, Serbia allies itself with Hungary to gain independence.
- September 14 – Legend of Nazaré: Dom Fuas Roupinho, alcalde of Porto de Mós, is inspired by a Marian miracle to erect the Sanctuary of Our Lady of Nazaré overlooking Nazaré, Portugal. Later this year while trying to enter the harbor of Ceuta by surprise to sink Muslim ships he is spotted and killed.
- A Sicilian attempt to dislodge the Moorish fleet from Mallorca fails.

==== England ====
- William Marshal, Norman knight and head of the household of Henry the Young King, is accused of having an affair with Henry's wife, Queen Margaret of France. Although contemporary chroniclers doubt the truth of these accusations. Henry starts the process to have his marriage annulled, William leaves the royal retinue, undergoing a period of self-imposed exile, and goes on a pilgrimage to Cologne.

==== Asia ====
- May – The Yōwa era, marked by famine, ends during the reign of Emperor Antoku in Japan.

=== By topic ===
==== Religion ====
- The Maronite Church reestablishes its affiliation with the Roman Catholic Church.

== Births ==
- September 11 – Minamoto no Yoriie, Japanese shogun (d. 1204)
- September 19 – Reginald de Braose, Norman nobleman (d. 1228)
- Alexios I (Megas Komnenos), emperor of Trebizond (d. 1222)
- Alexios IV (Angelos), Byzantine emperor (approximate date)
- Alice of Vergy, duchess and regent of Burgundy (d. 1251)
- Bouchard IV, French nobleman (House of Avesnes) (d. 1244)
- Eleanor of Aragon, Spanish princess and countess (d. 1226)
- Enguerrand III, French nobleman (House of Coucy) (d. 1242)
- Francis of Assisi, founder of the Franciscan Order (d. 1226)
- Fujiwara no Tomoie, Japanese nobleman and poet (d. 1258)
- Jochi, Mongol general and son of Genghis Khan
- Lutgardis (or Lutgarde), Flemish nun and saint (d. 1246)
- Maria of Montpellier, queen consort of Aragon (d. 1213)
- Sakya Pandita, Tibetan Buddhist leader (d. 1251)
- Verdiana, Italian noblewoman and saint (d. 1242)

== Deaths ==
- January 13 – Agnes of Austria, queen of Hungary (b. 1154)
- May 12 – Valdemar I (the Great), king of Denmark (b. 1131)
- May 16 – John Komnenos Vatatzes, Byzantine general
- July – Maria Komnene, Byzantine princess (poisoned) (b. 1152)
- July – Renier of Montferrat (the Caesar John), Italian husband of Maria Komnene (poisoned) (b. 1162)
- July 25 – Maria I, countess of Boulogne (b. 1136)
- August 1 – Pietro da Pavia, Italian cardinal-bishop
- September 15 – Robert III, Italo-Norman nobleman
- October 6 – Richard Peche, bishop of Coventry
- Ahmed-Al-Kabeer, Arab preacher and teacher (b. 1119)
- Farrukh Shah, Ayyubid ruler and nephew of Saladin
- Fujiwara no Kiyoko, Japanese empress (b. 1122)
- Henry I, count of Guelders and Zutphen (b. 1117)
- Hugo Etherianus, Italian cardinal and adviser (b. 1115)
- Cyril of Turov (or Kirill), Russian bishop (b. 1130)
- Maria of Antioch, Byzantine empress (b. 1145)
- Sonam Tsemo, Tibetan Buddhist leader (b. 1142)
- Zhao Boju, Chinese landscape painter (b. 1120)
