= Treaty of Sahagún =

The Treaty of Sahagún, being a treaty signed at Sahagún, may refer to:

- Treaty of Sahagún (1158)
- Treaty of Sahagún (1170)
