= Battle of Ichihara =

Battle in the Genpei War

- Part of Genpei War
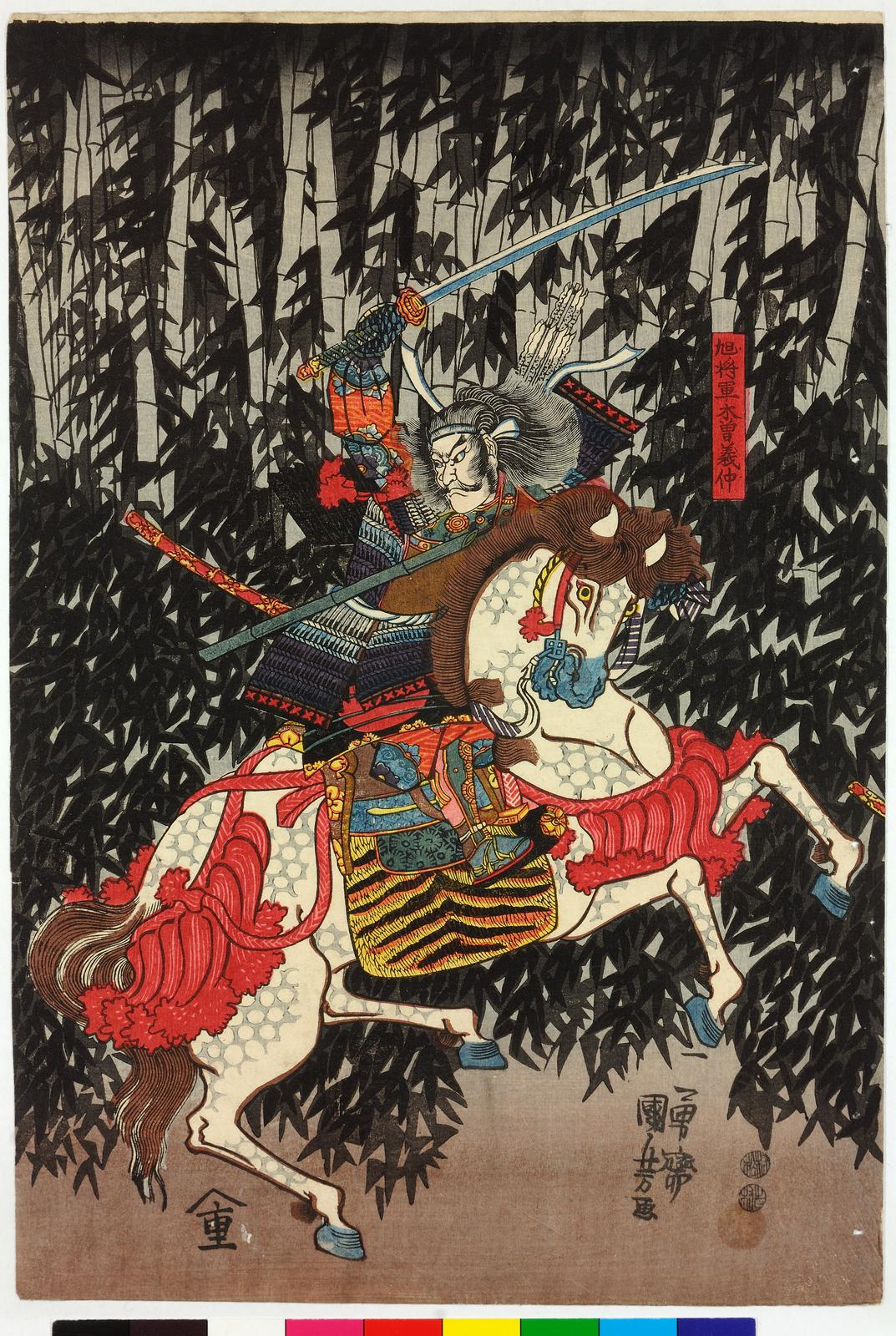
- Woodblock Print of Minamoto no Yoshinaka by Utagawa Kuniyoshi (歌川国芳)
Date	September 7, 1180 (Jishō calendar)
Location	"Ichihara", Shinano Province (modern day Nagano City, Nagano Prefecture)
Result	Minamoto victory

Belligerents
Minamoto clan	Taira clan

Commanders and leaders
Minamoto no Yoshinaka; Kakuhan; Murayama Yoshitada	(Taira clan) Kasahara Yorinao

The Battle of Ichihara (市原合戦, Ichihara Kassen) was a battle which took place in Shinano Province on September 7, 1180 (Jishō calendar) (September 29, 1180 in the Julian calendar). (Note: For differences between the Jishō and Julian calendars, see 治承#西暦との対照表) (Note: As 1180 was a leap year, the difference is 22 days, not 21.) It took place during the Genpei War, a civil war over control of Japan from 1180 to 1185. This is the first battle in which Minamoto no Yoshinaka appears in historical documents.

== Background ==
Minamoto no Yoshinaka was the son of Minamoto no Yoshikata, a swords chief under the Seiwa Genji. Yoshikata died in the Battle of Okura. The Azuma Kagami says that Yoshinaka was only a 3-year-old infant when this occurred, while the Heike Monogatari claims he was 2-years-old. After this, Yoshinaka's wet nurse fled with him to Kiso, where she requested her husband raise him, which he accepted. Once he became of age, he wanted to establish his own house to defeat the Taira clan.

Kasahara Yorinao, a powerful samurai from Shinano, under the Taira clan, planned to invade Kiso.

== Battle ==
The Inoue clan of the Shinano Minamoto branch sensed an incoming attack from the Taira clan, which caused them to send an army to Kiso, led by Murayama Yoshitada. The battle took place near Ichihara, at Kurita Temple (now Kankei Temple).

The battle continued until sunset, when the Murayama side, outnumbered and low on arrows, sent a messenger to Minamoto no Yoshinaka camp for deployment of reinforcements and to inform him of the situation. Yoshinaka then marched a large army to the battlefield, after which Kasahara and his army retreated immediately to the Jou Clan, a powerful clan in Echigo Province (also under the Taira).

== Aftermath ==
For this reason, Jou Nagamochi alongside Kasahara Yorinao led a large army and invaded Shinano Province in hopes of annihilating Minamoto no Yoshinaka's army. This led to the Battle of Yokotagawara in which Jou Nagamochi failed to achieve his objective.

== See also ==
- List of wars involving Japan
- List of Japanese battles
- Heian period
- Kamakura shogunate
