= Kenkyū =

Period of Japanese history (1190–1199 CE)

Kenkyū (建久) was a Japanese era name (年号, nengō, "year name") after Bunji and before Shōji. This period spanned the years from April 1190 through April 1199. The reigning emperor was Go-Toba-tennō (後鳥羽天皇).

== Change of era ==
- 1190 Kenkyū gannen (建久元年): The new era name was created to mark an event or a number of events. The previous era ended and a new one commenced in Bunji 6, on the 14th day of the 8th month of 1185.

== Events of the Kenkyū era ==
- 1192 (Kenkyū 3, 13th day of the 3rd month): The former-Emperor Go-Shirakawa died at the age of 66. He had been father or grandfather to five emperors -- Emperor Nijō, the 78th emperor; Emperor Rokujō, the 79th emperor; Emperor Takakura, the 80th emperor; Emperor Antoku, the 81st emperor; and Go-Toba, the 82nd emperor.
- 1192 (Kenkyū 3, 12th day of the 7th month): Minamoto no Yoritomo is named commander-in-chief of the forces to fight the barbarians.
- 1195 (Kenkyū 6, 4th day of the 3rd month): Shōgun Yoritomo revisits the capital.
- 1198 (Kenkyū 9, 11th day of the 1st month): In the 15th year of Go-Toba-tennō's reign (後鳥天皇15年), the emperor abdicated; and the succession (senso) was received by his eldest son.
- 1198 (Kenkyū 9, 3rd month): Emperor Tsuchimikado is said to have acceded to the throne (sokui).
- 1199 (Kenkyū 10, 13th day of the 1st month): Shōgun Yoritomo dies at age 53 in Kamakura.

== See also ==
- Mumyōzōshi, a text on literary criticism also known as Kenkyū Monogatari

== Notes ==
Preceded by Bunji	Era or nengō Kenkyū; 1190–1199	Succeeded by Shōji
