= Genryaku =

Period of Japanese history (1184–1185 CE)

Genryaku (元暦) was a Japanese era name (年号, nengō, lit. "year name") after Juei and before Bunji. This period spanned the years from April 1184 through August 1185. The reigning emperors were Antoku-tennō (安徳天皇) and Go-Toba-tennō (後鳥羽天皇).

== Change of era ==
- 1184 Genryaku gannen (元暦元年): The new era name was created to mark an event or a number of events. The previous era ended and a new one commenced in Juei 3, on the 16th day of the 4th month of 1184.

== Events of the Genryaku era ==
- 1185 (Genryaku 2, 24th day of the 3rd month): the Taira (also known as the Heike) and the Minamoto clashed in the Battle of Dan-no-ura; and the Heike were utterly defeated.
- 1185 (Genryaku 2, 9th day of the 7th month): Great earthquake caused turmoil in the capital and in the neighboring provinces.

Preceded by Juei	Era or nengō Genryaku; 1184–1185	Succeeded by Bunji
