= Prince Masanari =

Prince Masanari (雅成親王, Masanari shinnō; 1200–1255) was a waka poet and Japanese nobleman active in the early Kamakura period. He was a son of Emperor Go-Toba.

Masanari is designated as a member of the New Thirty-Six Immortals of Poetry (新三十六歌仙, Shinsanjūrokkasen).
