= Bunji (era) =

Period of Japanese history (1185–1190 CE)

Bunji (文治) was a Japanese era name (年号, nengō; lit. "year name") after Genryaku and before Kenkyū. This period spanned the years from August 1185 through April 1190. The reigning emperor was Go-Toba-tennō (後鳥羽天皇).

== Change of era ==
- 1185 Bunji gannen (文治元年): The new era name was created to mark an event or a number of events. The previous era ended and a new one commenced in Genryaku 2, on the 16th day of the 4th month of 1184.

== Events of the Bunji era ==
- 1185 (Bunji 1, 29th day of the 11th month): The court formally approves of the establishment of a shogunate government at Kamakura in the Kantō region.
- 1186 (Bunji 2, 4th month): Go-Shirakawa visits Kenrei-mon In, mother of the late Emperor Antoku and last Imperial survivor of the Battle of Dan-no-ura, at her humble retreat in the nunnery of Jakkō-in, near Ōhara, Sakyō-ku, Kyoto.

== Notes ==
Preceded by Genryaku	Era or nengō Bunji; 1185–1190	Succeeded by Kenkyū
