= Emperor Go-Toba =

Emperor of Japan from 1183 to 1198

Emperor Go-Toba 後鳥羽天皇
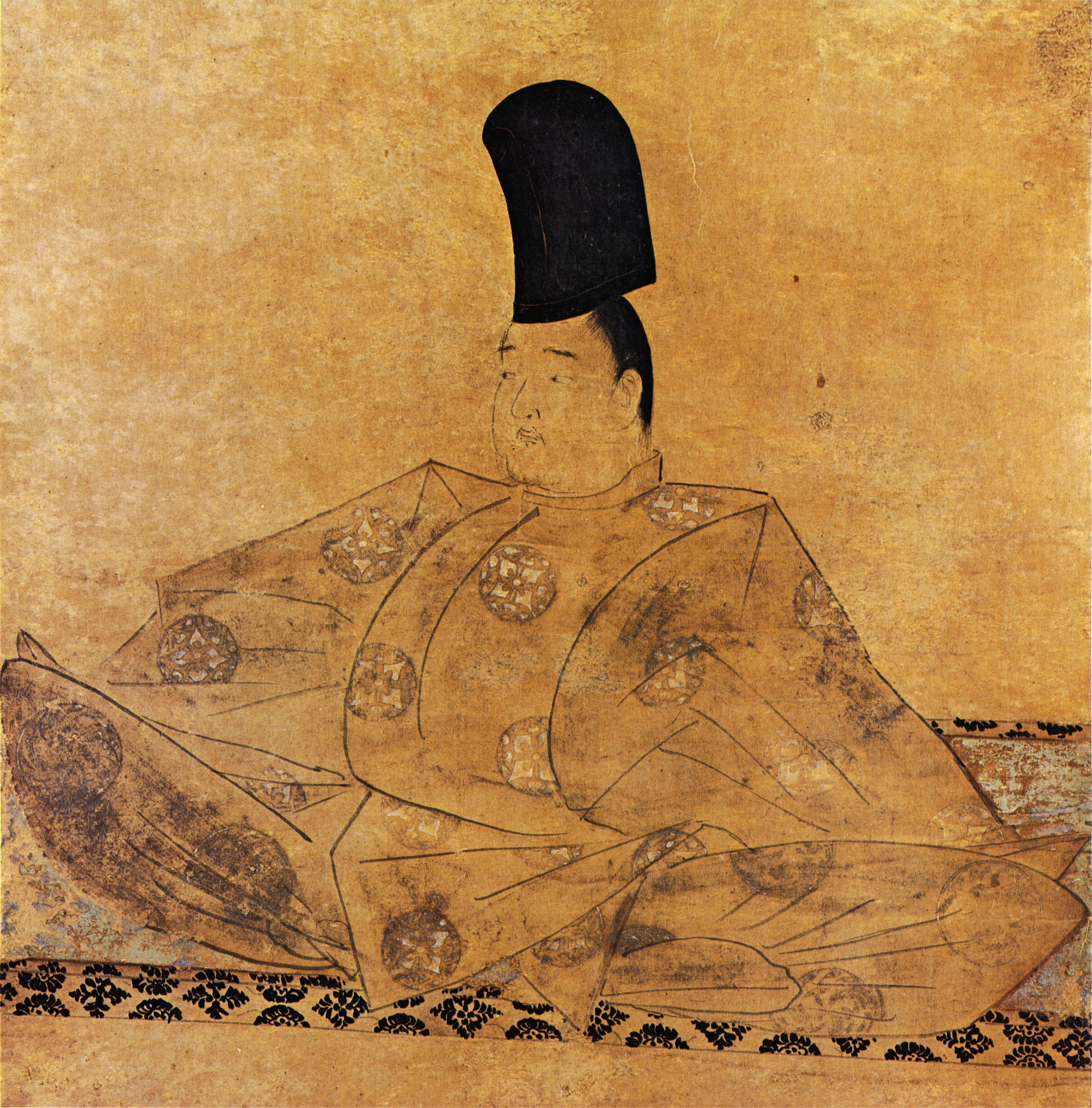
- Portrait by Fujiwara no Nobuzane, 1221

Emperor of Japan
- Reign: 8 September 1183 – 18 February 1198
- Enthronement: 4 September 1184
- Predecessor: Antoku
- Successor: Tsuchimikado
- Shōgun: Minamoto no Yoritomo
- Born: 6 August 1180; Gojō-machi no Tei (五条町の亭), Heian-kyō
- Died: 28 March 1239 (aged 58); Karita Gosho (苅田御所), Oki Islands, Kamakura shogunate
- Burial: Ōhara no Misasagi (大原陵), Kyōto
- Spouse: Fujiwara no Ninshi (m. 1190)
- Issue more...: Princess Shōshi; Emperor Tsuchimikado; Emperor Juntoku; Prince Masanari
Posthumous name
- Tsuigō: Emperor Go-Toba (後鳥羽院 or 後鳥羽天皇)
- House: Imperial House of Japan
- Father: Emperor Takakura
- Mother: Fujiwara no Shokushi (Shichijō-in)
- Religion: Buddhism

Emperor Go-Toba (後鳥羽天皇, Go-Toba-tennō; 6 August 1180 – 28 March 1239) was the 82nd emperor of Japan, according to the traditional order of succession. His reign spanned the years from 1183 through 1198.

This 12th-century sovereign was named after Emperor Toba, and go- (後, lit. "later") and thus, he is sometimes called the "Later Emperor Toba". The word go has also been translated to mean the "second one"; and in some older sources, this emperor may be identified as "Toba the Second" or as "Toba II".

== Genealogy ==
Before his ascension to the Chrysanthemum Throne, his personal name (his imina) was Takahira-shinnō (尊成親王). He was also known as Takanari-shinnō

He was the fourth son of Emperor Takakura, and thus grandson of Emperor Go-Shirakawa. His mother was Bōmon Shokushi (坊門殖子, Empress Dowager Shichijō-in, 七条院), daughter of Bōmon Nobutaka (坊門信隆) of the Fujiwara clan.

=== Consorts and children ===
- Empress (chūgū): Fujiwara no Ninshi / Takako, later Gishūmon-in (宜秋門院), Kujō Kanezane's daughter
  - First Daughter: Imperial Princess Shōshi, later Shunkamon-in (春華門院, 1195–1211) – unmarried Empress as adopted mother of Emperor Juntoku
- Consort: Minamoto no Zaishi / Ariko (源在子) later Shomeimon-in (承明門院; 1171–1257), Minamoto no Michichika's adopted daughter and priest Nōen's daughter
  - First Son: Imperial Prince Tamehito (為仁親王) later Emperor Tsuchimikado
- Consort: Fujiwara no Shigeko (藤原重子) later Shumeimon-in (修明門院; 1182–1264), Takakura Norisue's daughter
  - Third Son: Imperial Prince Morinari (守成親王) later Emperor Juntoku
  - Imperial Prince Masanari (雅成親王, exiled after Jōkyū War)
  - Imperial Prince Priest Sonkai (尊快法親王, 1204–1246) – Head Priest of Enryaku-ji Temple (Tendai Zasu, 天台座主)
- Court lady: Bōmon no Tsubone (坊門局), Bōmon Nobukiyo's daughter
  - Imperial Prince Nagahito (長仁親王, 1196–1249) later Imperial Prince Priest Dōjo (道助法親王), become 8th Head priest of Ninna-ji Temple
  - Third Daughter: Imperial Princess Reishi (礼子内親王; 1200–1273) later Kayōmon-in (嘉陽門院)
  - Imperial Prince Yorihito (頼仁親王, 1201–1264) (exiled after Jōkyū Incident)
- Court lady: Hyōe-no-kami no Tsubone (兵衛督局), Minamoto no Nobuyasu's daughter
  - Second Daughter: Imperial Princess Shukushi (粛子内親王; b.1196) (Takatsuji Saigū, 高辻斎宮) – Saiō at Ise Shrine 1199–1210
- Court lady: Owari no Tsubone (尾張局, d.1204), priest Kensei's daughter
  - Imperial Prince Dōkaku (道覚法親王; 1204–1250) – Head Priest of Enryaku-ji Temple (Tendai Zasu, 天台座主)
- Court lady: Ōmiya no Tsubone (大宮局), Fujiwara no Sadayoshi's daughter
  - Imperial Prince Son'en (尊円法親王; 1207–1231) – Head Priest of Miidera Temple
  - Gyōetsu (行超) – priest in Emryakuji Temple
- Court lady: Shonagon no Suke (少納言典侍)
  - Dōshu (道守) – priest
- Court lady: Kamegiku (亀菊), a dancer (Shirabyōshi)
- Court lady: Taki (滝; d.1265), a dancer (Shirabyōshi)
  - Imperial Prince Kakunin (覚仁法親王; 1198–1266) – Head priest of Onjō-ji Temple
- Court lady: Tamba no Tsubone (丹波局), Ishi (石), a dancer (Shirabyōshi)
  - Imperial Princess Hiroko (煕子内親王, b.1205) – Saiō served at Ise Shrine during the reigns of Emperor Juntoku and Emperor Chūkyō 1215–1221
- Court lady: Himehōshi (姫法師), a dancer (Shirabyōshi)
  - Kakuyo (覚誉) – priest
  - Dōi (道伊) – priest in Onjō-ji Temple
  - Dōen (道縁) – priest in Ninna-ji Temple
- Mother Unknown:
  - Son: Prince Ichijo (一条宮, 1201–1213)
  - princess (1202–1207)

== Events of Go-Toba's life ==
Go-Toba took the throne at the age of three.

- 8 September 1183 (Juei 2, 20th day of the 8th month): In the 3rd year of Antoku-tennō's reign (安徳天皇三年), the emperor fled the capital rather than give in to pressures for his abdication. In Antoku's absence, the cloistered former-Emperor Go-Shirakawa then elevated Antoku's younger brother by decree; and the young child was given the acceptance of abdication (juzen) rites. The anti-Taira faction intended that the succession (senso) was received; and shortly thereafter, Emperor Go-Toba is said to have acceded to the throne (sokui).

Although these formal rites and ceremonies were taking place in Heian-kyō, the imperial regalia were still held by Antoku. Thus, the senso and sokui of Go-Toba became the first in history to omit the ritual transmission of the sacred treasures from a sovereign to his successor.

In 1192 Go-Shirakawa died and the first shogunate was established by Minamoto no Yoritomo, and the emperor became a figurehead.

In 1198, Go-Toba abdicated in favor of his son, Emperor Tsuchimikado.

Go-Toba reigned as cloistered Emperor from 1198 till 1221 during reigns of three emperors, but his power was more limited than former cloistered Emperors in the Heian period.

It was during this time that Go-Toba decreed that the followers of the Pure Land sect in Kyōto, led by Hōnen, be banished or in some cases executed. Originally this was prompted by complaints of clergy in Kyoto who were concerned about the rise in popularity of the new sect, but Go-Toba personally ordered the decree after two of his ladies in waiting converted to the sect without his knowledge.

In 1221, the shōgun installed Go-Toba's three-year-old grandson, Emperor Chūkyō, as emperor, but Go-Toba chose to stage a rebellion in an attempt to reclaim the throne and overthrow the Kamakura shogunate. This conflict is known as the Jōkyū War, named after the era in which it occurred. Samurai around Kyōto who were against the Shogunate supported him but most samurai, particularly in Kantō, supported the Shogunate with encouragement of Hōjō Masako, the widow of Yoritomo. She persuaded samurai gathering in Kamakura that if they would not support the Shōgunate, then the contemporary status and privileges that samurai had attained would be lost, and the court and kuge would regain their power and influence. Go-Toba's rebellion was defeated and Chūkyō was replaced as emperor by Go-Horikawa, a nephew of Go-Toba.

After the rebellion Go-Toba was exiled to the Oki Islands. He died and was buried there.

=== Non-political activities ===
"Letting the radiance of his power and majesty shine forth unobscured, at the same time he amused himself with every variety of art and accomplishment. In all of these he was second to none, so that people wondered when and how he had gained such proficiency. And many who were experts at one or another of these arts were enabled by the ex-emperor's interest to attain fame and fortune. It is said that the Buddha leads all men to salvation, even those guilty of the ten evils and five deadly sins. For his part, the ex-sovereign showed an interest in every accomplishment, even those which seemed of the most trivial and insignificant kind. So that all sorts of people who had any claim to knowledge of these matters were summoned to his presence, where, it appears, they could petition freely for his favor.
Among all these arts, his skill in Japanese poetry might be said to leave one at a loss for superlatives. People might think that to speak in this way is to make much out of nothing. But since a great many of the ex-sovereign's compositions may be easily found in various collections, anyone can judge for himself. It may be imagined what must have been his skill in other arts and accomplishments. But as long as endure the texts of his poetic compositions as people have written them down and preserved them, even remote generations may see for themselves the extent of his poetic mastery."

— Minamoto Ienaga, private secretary, Zenchukai

Despite the limits on his political powers, he developed skills as a calligrapher, painter, musician, poet, critic, and editor, although the majority of his activities took place after his abdication aged 18 (as the abdication freed him from 'the ceremonial prison of the imperial palace').

Besides his enthusiasm for archery, equestrianism, and swordsmanship, Go-Toba was a great lover of swords. He summoned swordsmiths to his court where they were given honorary titles. They taught the emperor their craft. As a result he became a respectable swordsmith himself. It was his patronage and encouragement of this art that gave birth to Japan's 'Golden Age' of bladesmithing. His contribution to the art is still held in high esteem. Even today a tradition maintains how in sword literature he is the first and foremost swordsmith discussed.

His greatest contribution to literature is the Shin Kokinshū (The New Anthology of Ancient and Modern Waka), which Japanese has considered one of three major influential waka anthologies along Man'yōshū and Kokin Wakashū. He ordered its creation and took part in the working group as an editor. He revived the Office of Waka (和歌所) and made it the headquarters of this edition. He held many utakai (waka parties) and utaawase (waka competitions). Not only the creator and organizer, he acted as a critic, and wrote the style of waka in general and criticism of his contemporary poets.

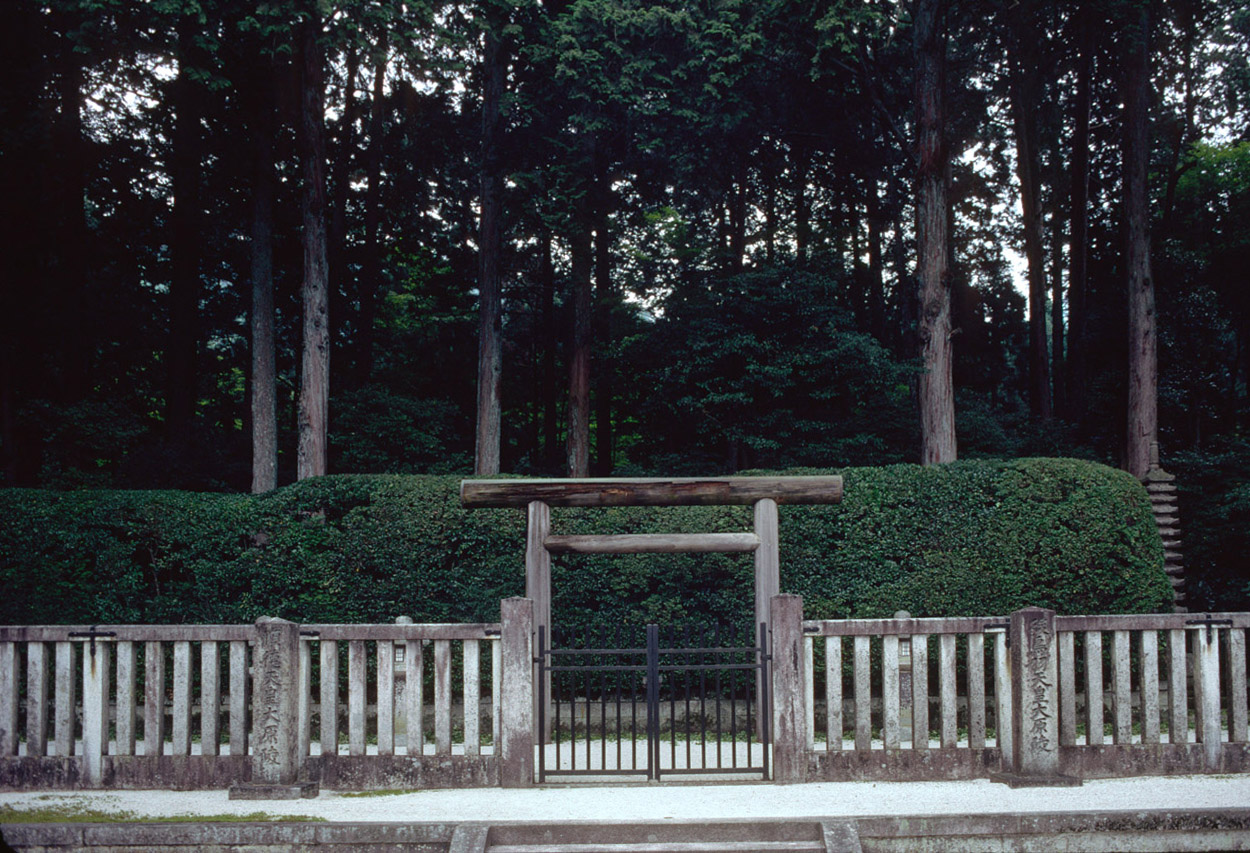
Tomb of Emperor Go-Toba and Emperor Juntoku, Kyoto

During his exile, he continued to compose hundreds of waka and to edit both anthologies from his creation in Oki Islands and a private edition of Shin Kokinshū for 18 years, getting rid of around 400 wakas from the former edition, while its edition had been officially declared to be completed in 1204, and further elaborations finished even in 1216. While he declared his private edition should be authentic, today the 1216 version is considered as the authentic and others as variants. His edition is today called Oki-bon Shin Kokinshū (Oki edition). It is probable that during his exile, he also wrote his Go-Toba no in gokuden ("Secret Teachings"), a short work on aesthetic criticism; the "Secret Teachings" are particularly valuable as a major source on Go-Toba's complicated relationships with his former client, the greatest poet of the age – Fujiwara no Teika.

One of his 31-syllable poems was chosen by Fujiwara no Teika as Number 99 in the popular anthology Hyakunin Isshu.

==== Kugyō ====
Kugyō (公卿) is a collective term for the very few most powerful men attached to the court of the Emperor of Japan in pre-Meiji eras.

In general, this elite group included only three to four men at a time. These were hereditary courtiers whose experience and background would have brought them to the pinnacle of a life's career. During Go-Toba's reign, this apex of the Daijō-kan included:

- Sesshō, Konoe Motomichi, 1160–1233.
- Sesshō, Matsu Morie, 1172–1238.
- Sesshō, Kujō Kanezane.
- Daijō-daijin, Kujō Kanezane.
- Daijō-daijin, Kujō Kanefusa, d. 1217.
- Sadaijin, Ōimikado Tsunemune, 1119–1189.
- Sadaijin, Todaiji Sanesada, 1139–1191.
- Sadaijin, Sanjō Sanefusa, 1147–1225.
- Sadaijin, Ōimikado Yorizane, 1155–1225.
- Udaijin, Tokudaiji Sanesada.
- Udaijin, Sanjō Sanefusa.
- Udaijin, Ōimikado Yorizane.
- Nadaijin, Matsu Morie.
- Nadaijin, Tokudaiji Sanesada.
- Nadaijin, Konoe Motomichi.
- Nadaijin, Kujō Kanefusa.
- Nadaijin, Kujō Yoshimichi, 1167–1188.
- Nadaijin, Fujiwara Tudachida, d. 1195.
- Nadaijin, Kujō Yoshitsine, 1169–1206.
- Dainagon

== Eras of Go-Toba's reign ==
The years of Go-Toba's reign are more specifically identified by more than one era name or nengō.

- Juei (1182–1184)
- Genryaku (1184–1185)
- Bunji (1185–1190)
- Kenkyū (1190–1199)

== Ancestry ==
Ancestors of Emperor Go-Toba

8. Emperor Toba (1103-1156)
4. Emperor Go-Shirakawa (1127-1192)
9. Fujiwara no Tamako (1101-1145)
2. Emperor Takakura (1161-1181)
10. Taira no Tokinobu (d. 1149)
5. Taira no Shigeko (1142-1176)
11. Fujiwara no Yūko
1. Emperor Go-Toba
12. Fujiwara no Shinsuke (d. 1184)
6. Bōmon (Fujiwara no) Nobutaka (1126-1179)
13. Tachibana
3. Shichijō-in (Fujiwara no Shokushi) (1157-1228)
14. Fujiwara no Michimoto (1090-1148)
7. Fujiwara no Kyūshi

== See also ==
- Emperor of Japan
- List of Emperors of Japan
- Imperial cult
- Minase Shrine

== Notes ==
Japanese Imperial kamon – a stylized chrysanthemum blossom

Regnal titles
Preceded by Emperor Antoku	Emperor of Japan: Go-Toba; 1183–1198	Succeeded by Emperor Tsuchimikado
