= Yōwa =

Period of Japanese history (1181–1182 CE)

Yōwa (養和) was a Japanese era name (年号, nengō; lit. "year name") after Jishō and before Juei. This period spanned the years from July 1181 through May 1182. The reigning emperor was Antoku-tennō (安徳天皇).

== Change of era ==
- 1181 Yōwa gannen (養和元年): The new era name was created to mark an event or a number of events. The previous era ended and a new one commenced in Jishō 5, on the 14th day of the 7th month of 1181.

== Events of the Yōwa era ==
- 1181 (Yōwa 1, 25th day of the 11th month): Tokuko, former consort of the late Emperor Takakura, adopts the name of Kenreimon-in.
- 1181 (Yōwa 1): A famine that lasts for two years blights this era.

== Notes ==
Preceded by Jishō	Era or nengō Yōwa; 1181–1182	Succeeded by Juei
