= Treaty of Sahagún (1170) =

1170 treaty between Castile and Aragon

The Treaty of Sahagún was signed in Sahagún on 4 June 1170 between Alfonso VIII of Castile and Alfonso II of Aragon. Based on the terms of the accord, Alfonso VIII agreed to give Afonso II three hostages in order to be used as tribute payments owed by Ibn Mardanīš of Valencia and Murcia. The hostages were to enter into the hand and potestas (or power) of Afonso I up until the terms of the agreement were met. Moreover, the hostages were not allowed to depart without permission.

== Sources ==
- Kosto, Adam J. Making Agreements in Medieval Catalonia: Power, Order, and the Written Word, 1000-1200. Cambridge University Press, 2001. ISBN 0-521-79239-8
