= Emperor Antoku =

Emperor of Japan from 1180 to 1185

Emperor Antoku 安徳天皇
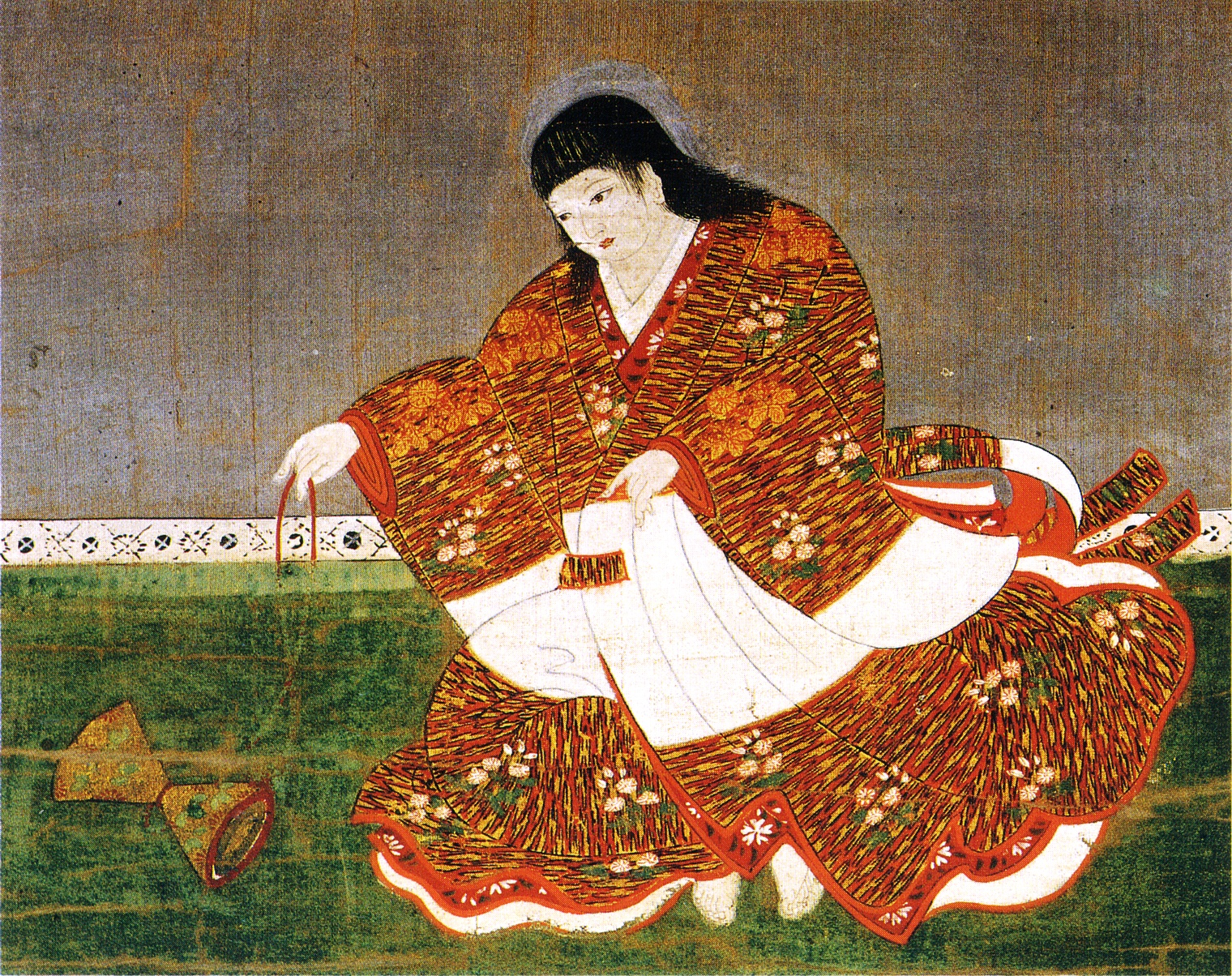
- Portrait from the Momoyama period

Emperor of Japan
- Reign: 18 March 1180 – 25 April 1185
- Enthronement: 18 May 1180
- Predecessor: Takakura
- Successor: Go-Toba
- Born: Tokihito-shinnō (言仁親王); 22 December 1178
- Died: 25 April 1185 (aged 6); Dan-no-ura, Kanmon Straits, Japan
- Burial: Amida-ji no Misasagi (阿弥陀寺陵) (Shimonoseki)
Posthumous name
- Chinese-style shigō: Emperor Antoku (安徳天皇)
- House: Imperial House of Japan
- Father: Emperor Takakura
- Mother: Taira no Tokuko

Emperor Antoku (安徳天皇, Antoku-tennō; 22 December 1178 – 25 April 1185) was the 81st emperor of Japan, according to the traditional order of succession. His reign spanned the years from 1180 through 1185. His death marked the end of the Heian period and the beginning of the Kamakura period.

During this time, the Imperial House of Japan was involved in a bitter struggle between warring clans. Minamoto no Yoritomo with his cousin Minamoto no Yoshinaka, led a force from the Minamoto clan against the Taira, who controlled the emperor. During the climactic sea Battle of Dan-no-ura in April 1185, Antoku's grandmother Taira no Tokiko took him and plunged with him into the water in the Shimonoseki Straits, drowning the child emperor rather than allowing him to be captured by the opposing forces.

This clash of clans led to numerous legends and tales. The story of Emperor Antoku and his mother's family became the subject of the Kamakura period epic poem The Tale of the Heike (Heike is an alternative reading of the Japanese characters for "House of the Taira"). Antoku's tomb is said to be located in a number of places around western Japan, including the island of Iōjima, a result of the spreading of legends about the emperor and the battle.

== Genealogy ==
Before his ascension to the Chrysanthemum Throne, his personal name (his imina) was Tokihito-shinnō (言仁親王). He was also known as Kotohito-shinnō.

His father was Emperor Takakura, and thus a grandson of retired Emperor Go-Shirakawa. His mother, Taira no Tokuko (平徳子), second daughter of Taira no Kiyomori (平清盛), was later referred to as Empress Dowager Kenrei (建礼門院, Kenrei-mon In).

== Events of Antoku's life ==
Antoku was named crown prince at around one month of age. He ascended the throne at the age of two. Naturally, he held no actual power, but rather his grandfather Taira no Kiyomori ruled in his name, though not officially, as sesshō (regent).

- 18 May 1180 (Jishō 4, 22nd day of the 4th month): In the 12th year of Takakura-tennō's reign (高倉天皇十二年), the emperor was forced to abdicate; and the succession (senso) was received by his infant son, the grandson of Taira Kiyomori. Shortly thereafter, Emperor Antoku is said to have acceded to the throne (sokui).

In the year of his enthronement, the capital was moved to modern-day Kōbe, Hyōgo, but it was soon moved back to Heian-kyō.

- 8 September 1183 (Juei 2, 20th day of the 8th month): Go-Toba is proclaimed emperor by the Minamoto; and consequently, there were two proclaimed emperors, one living in Heian-kyō and another in flight towards the south.

In 1183, when Minamoto no Yoshinaka entered the capital, the Taira clan fled with the young emperor and the sacred treasures to Yashima (the name of a place inside modern-day Takamatsu, Kagawa). Being defeated in ensuing battle, they fled westward.

- 25 April 1185 (Genryaku 2, 24th day of the 3rd month): The Taira and the Minamoto clashed in the Battle of Dan-no-ura.

The Taira were defeated. Antoku's grandmother, Taira no Tokiko, Kiyomori's widow, drowned herself along with the young emperor. His mother also drowned herself, but apparently, according to The Tale of the Heike (Heike Monogatari), she was pulled out with a rake by her long hair.

According to Yoshitsune's dispatch, the sacred seal was found, but the sacred sword was lost. The sword was one of the three sacred treasures.

=== Kugyō ===
Kugyō (公卿) is a collective term for the very few most powerful men attached to the court of the Emperor of Japan in pre-Meiji eras.

In general, this elite group included only three to four men at a time. These were hereditary courtiers whose experience and background would have brought them to the pinnacle of a life's career. During Antoku's reign, this apex of the Daijō-kan included:

- Sesshō, Konoe Motomichi, 1160–1233.
- Udaijin
- Nadaijin, Taira Munemori, 1147–1185.
- Dainagon

=== Memorial site ===
After his drowning, in order to mourn the body and placate any restless spirits, the Amidaji Goeidō was built. Later, Antoku was enshrined at the Kurume-Suitengū in Kurume, Fukuoka, and he came to be worshipped as Mizu-no-kami (水の神, lit. "water-god" or "god of water"), the god of easy delivery at Suitengū (水天宮, lit. "water-heaven/emperor-shrine") everywhere.

With the establishment of Shintō as the state religion of Japan, the Amidaji Temple was abandoned and the Akama Shrine was established in Shimonoseki in Yamaguchi Prefecture to celebrate Antoku.

The Imperial Household Agency designates Amida-ji no misasagi (阿彌陀寺陵) near Akama Shrine in Shimonoseki as Antoku's tomb.

== Eras of Antoku's reign ==
The years of Antoku's reign are more specifically identified by more than one era name or nengō.

- Jishō (1177–1181)
- Yōwa (1181–1182)
- Juei (1182–1184)
- Genryaku (1184–1185)
- Bunji (1185–1190)

== Ancestry ==
Ancestors of Emperor Antoku

8. Emperor Toba (1103–1156)
4. Emperor Go-Shirakawa (1127–1192)
9. Fujiwara no Tamako (1101–1145)
2. Emperor Takakura (1161–1181)
10. Taira no Tokinobu (d. 1149) (=14)
5. Taira no Shigeko (1142–1176)
11. Fujiwara no Yūko
1. Emperor Antoku
12. Taira no Tadamori (1096–1153)
6. Taira no Kiyomori (1118–1181)
13. Sister of Gion no Nyogo
3. Taira no Tokuko (1155–1214)
14. Taira no Tokinobu (d. 1149) (=10)
7. Taira no Tokiko (1126–1185)

== Popular culture ==
- In manga and anime Angolmois: Record of Mongol Invasion, he was said to survive, and he's Teruhi's great-grandfather. He met Jinzaburo Kuchii, a former samurai under Hojo disgraced in an incident and exiled to Tsushima Island to help the people there repel a joint Mongol Empire-Yuan Dynasty-Goryeo armies.
- In the television series Cosmos: A Personal Voyage, Carl Sagan recounts the story in the episode One Voice in the Cosmic Fugue.

== See also ==
- Emperor of Japan
- List of Emperors of Japan
- Imperial cult
- Akama Shrine (Akama jingū)
- Emperor Bing of Song, a child emperor who was also forced to commit suicide in a naval battle
- Shimonoseki City Information Mentions death of Emperor Antoku following the battle of Dan No Ura

== Notes ==
Japanese Imperial kamon – a stylized chrysanthemum blossom

Regnal titles
Preceded by Emperor Takakura	Emperor or Tennō: Antoku; 1180–1185	Succeeded by Emperor Go-Toba
