= Jishō =

Period of Japanese history (1177–1181 CE)

Jishō (治承) was a Japanese era name (年号, nengō, "year name") after Angen and before Yōwa. This period spanned the years from August 1177 through July 1181. The reigning emperors were Takakura-tennō (高倉天皇) and Antoku-tennō (安徳天皇).

== Change of era ==
- 1177 Jishō gannen (治承元年): The new era name was created to mark an event or a number of events. The previous era ended and a new one commenced in Angen 3, on the 4th day of the 8th month of 1177.

== Events of the Jishō era ==
- 1177 (Jishō 1, 28th day of the 4th month): A great fire in the capital was spread by high winds; and the palace was reduced to cinders.
- 1178 (Jishō 2, 12th day of the 11th month): Emperor Takakura's consort, Tokuko, gives birth to an infant who will become Emperor Antoku.
- 1180 (Jishō 4, 21st day of the 2nd month): Emperor Takakura abdicates.
- 1180 (Jishō 4, 21st day of the 4th month): In the 12th year of Takakura-tennō's reign (高倉天皇12年), the emperor was forced to abdicate; and the succession (senso) was received by his infant son, the grandson of Taira Kiyomori.
- 1180 (Jishō 4, 22nd day of the 4th month): Emperor Antoku's is said to have acceded to the throne (sokui) on the day of his coronation ceremony.
- 1180 (Jishō 4, 2nd day of the 6th month): Former-Emperor Go-Shirakawa-in, former-emperor Takakura-in and Emperor Antoku leave Kyoto for Fukuhara, which is near modern-day Kōbe, Hyōgo.
- 1180 (Jishō 4, 26th day of the 11th month): The capital is moved back to Kyoto from Fukuhara.
- 1180 (Jishō 4): A devastating whirlwind causes havoc in Heian-kyō, the capital.
- 1181 (Jishō 5, 14th day of the 1st month): Emperor Takakura dies.
- 1181 (Jishō 5, 25th day of the 4th month): Battle of Sunomata-gawa

| Preceded by Angen | Era or nengō Jishō; 1177–1181 | Succeeded by Yōwa |
