= Juei =

Period of Japanese history (1182–1184 CE)

Juei (寿永) was a Japanese era name (年号, nengō, lit. "year name") after Yōwa and before Genryaku. This period spanned the years from May 1182 through March 1184. The reigning emperors were Antoku-tennō (安徳天皇) and Go-Toba-tennō (後鳥羽天皇).

== Change of era ==
- 1182 Juei gannen (寿永元年): The new era name was created to mark an event or a number of events. The previous era ended and a new one commenced in Yōwa 2, on the 27th day of the 5th month of 1182.

== Events of the Juei era ==
- 1182 (Juei 1): The entire country suffers a famine.
- 1183 (Juei 2, 25th day of 7th month): The Heike flee the capital with Emperor Antoku and Three Sacred Treasures.
- 1183 (Juei 2, 20th day of the 8th month): In the 3rd year of Antoku-tennō's reign (安徳天皇25年), the emperor fled the capital rather than give in to pressures for his abdication. In Antoku's absence, the cloistered former-Emperor Go-Shirakawa then elevated his young brother by decree; and the young child was given the acceptance of abdication (juzen) rites. The anti-Taira faction intended that the succession (senso) was received; and shortly thereafter, Emperor Go-Toba is said to have acceded to the throne (sokui).
- 1183 (Juei 2, 20th day of 8th month): Emperor Go-Toba is enthroned without the imperial regalia.
- 1183 (Juei 2, 20th day of the 8th month): Go-Toba is proclaimed emperor by the Genji; and consequently, there were two proclaimed emperors, one living in Heian-kyō and another in flight towards the south.
- 1184 (Juei 3', 2nd month): Cloistered Emperor Go-Shirakawa orders letter to be written to the Heike demanding the restoration or return of the imperial regalia.

== Notes ==
Preceded by Yōwa	Era or nengō Juei; 1182–1184	Succeeded by Genryaku
