= Konoe Iezane =

Japanese court noble

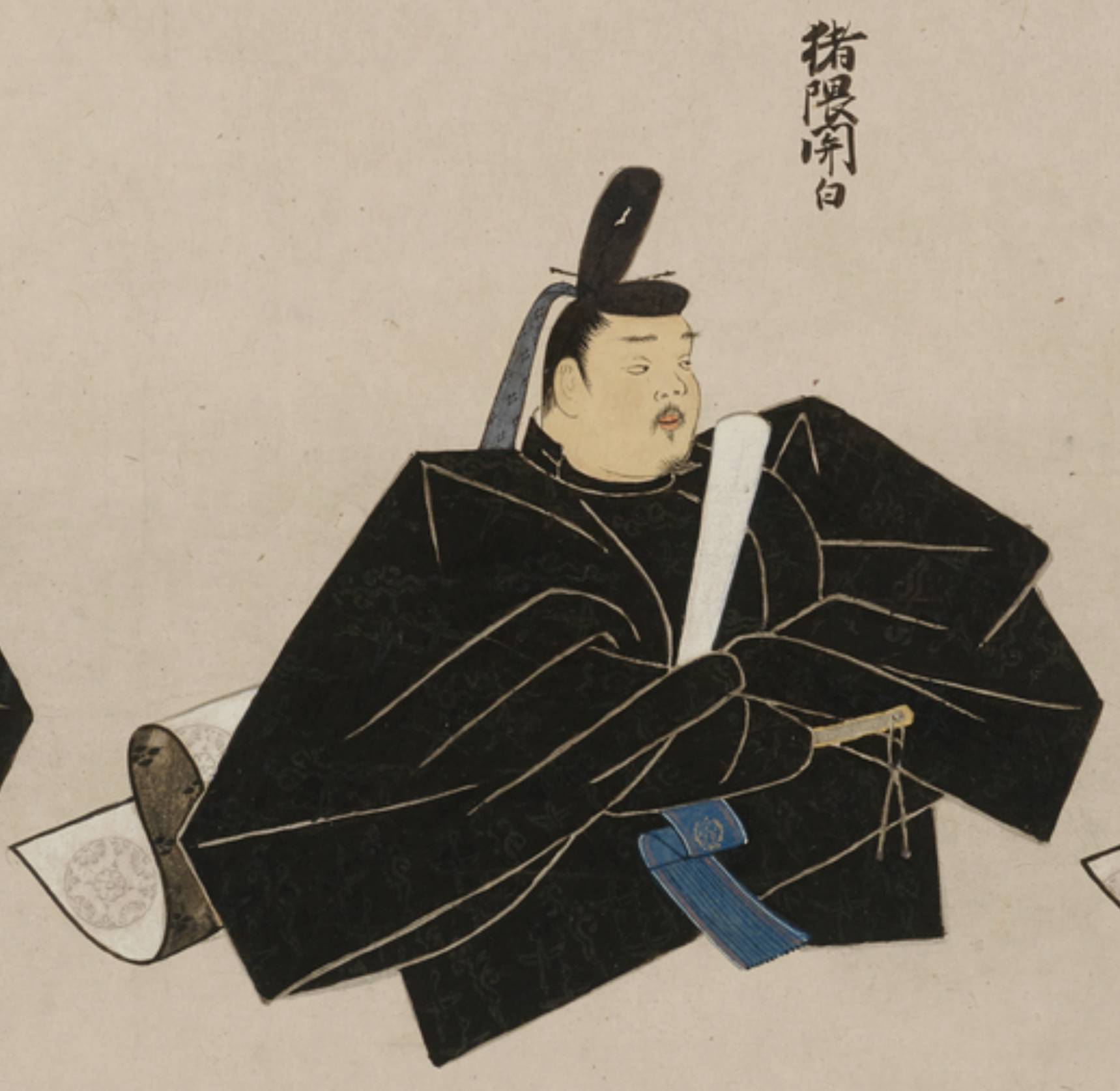
Konoe Iezane

Konoe Iezane (近衛 家実; 1179 – January 19, 1243), son of Motomichi, was a court noble (Kugyō) of the early Kamakura period. His sons include: Takatsukasa Kanehira, Konoe Iemichi (近衛家通; 1204-1224) and Konoe Kanetsune.

In 1206 when Kujō Yoshitune died, he became the head of the Fujiwara family and Sesshō. The same year he was appointed Kampaku. In the Jōkyū War (1221) he opposed to Emperor Go-Toba, costing him the post. After the war he was reappointed Sesshō.

- 1206 (Ken'ei 1, 3rd month): Iezane becomes regent for the emperor.
- 1206 (Ken'ei 1, 12th month): Iezane ceases to function as sesshō; and instead, he becomes kampaku (chancellor).
- 1221 (Jōkyū 3, 4th month): Iezane loses his position as kampaku; and Kujō Michiie takes on the role of regent.
- 1221 (Jōkyū 3, 7th month): The sesshō Michiie is replaced by Iezane.
- 1221 (Jōkyū 3): In the winter of this year, Iezane is named Daijō Daijin.
- 1223 (Jōō 2, 10th month): Iezane ceases to be sesshō; and his title is changed to kampaku.
- 1227 (Antei 1, 2nd month): Emperor Go-Horikawa raised Fujiwara no Nagako, the daughter of Konoe Iezane, to the rank of Chūgū (empress consort). She was somewhat older than the emperor, but he loved her madly.
- 1241 (Ninji 2, 11th month): Iezane ordains as a Buddhist monk, taking the Dharma name Enshin (円心).

He died the following year.

== Family ==
- Father: Konoe Motomichi
- Mother: Daughter of Minamoto no Akinobu
- Concubine: Daughter of Fujiwara Kishinobu
  - 1st Son: Konoe Iemichi (近衛家通; 1204-1224)
  - 3rd Son: Konoe Kanetsune (近衛兼経;1210-1259)
  - 1st Daughter: Konoe Nagako (近衛長子; 1218–1275), married Emperor Go-Horikawa
- Concubine: Daughter of Fujiwara no Tadayuki
  - 4th Son: Takatsukasa Kanehira (鷹司兼平;1228-1294)
  - 6th Son: Jizen (慈禅; 1231-1276)
- Concubine: Daughter of Fujiwara no Tadayuki
  - 7th Son: Matsudata (増忠; 1233-1298)
  - 8th Son: Seikane (聖兼; 1241-1293)
- Concubine: Daughter of Usa Hiromichi
  - 9th Son: Satomi (聖実)
- Unknown Concubine
  - 2nd Son: Konoe Ietsuke (近衛家輔; 1208?-1221)
  - 5th Son: Jitsusei (実静; 1230–?)
  - 10th Son: another son
