= Waniguchi =

Japanese gong used in Shinto and Buddhist worship

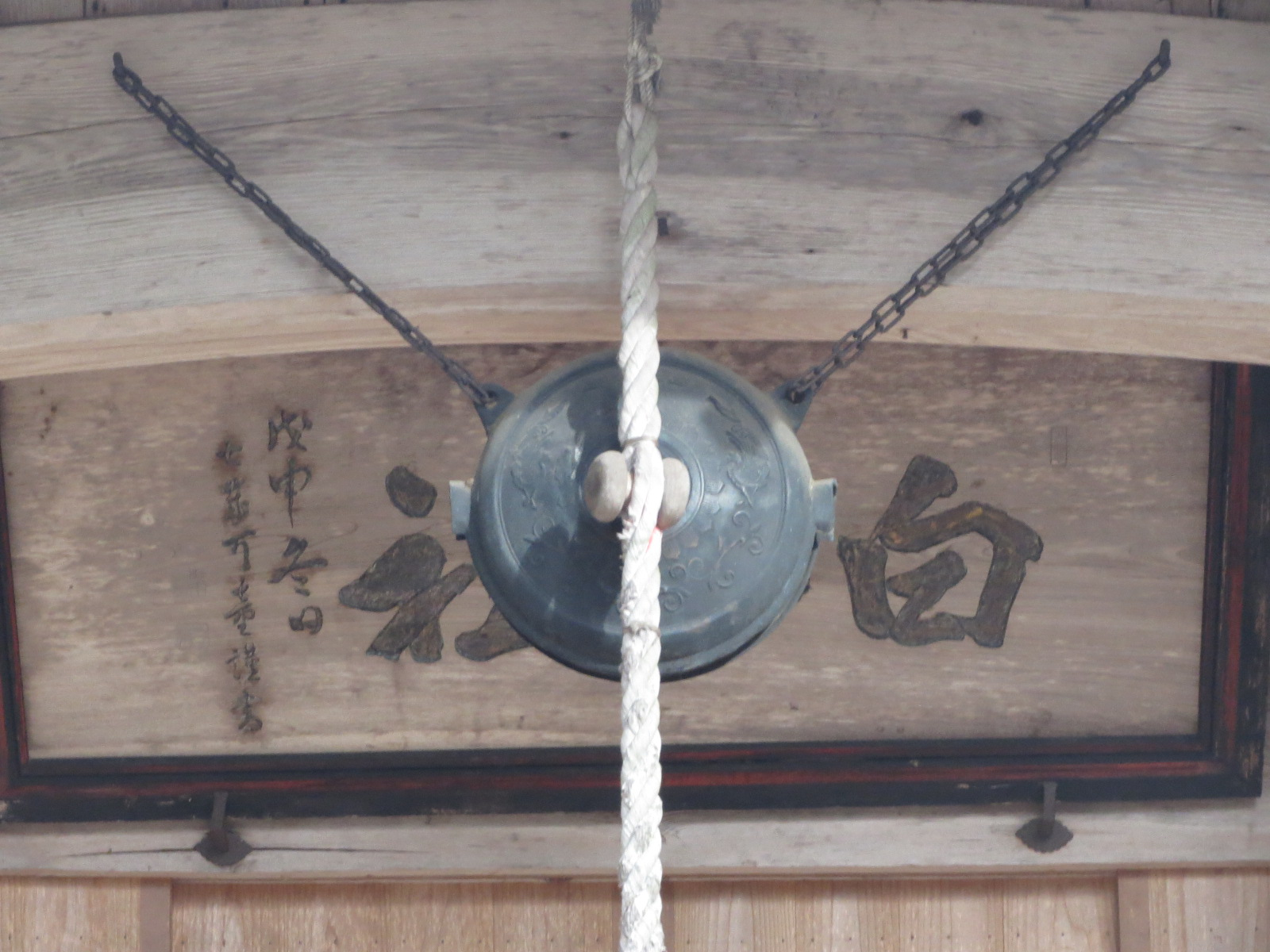
Waniguchi ready for sounding, with rope and striker, at Hakusan Jinja (ja), Iwate Prefecture

A waniguchi (鰐口) is a Japanese flat round hollow metal slit gong that hangs before the worship hall at a Shinto shrine or image hall at a Buddhist temple. By shaking the rope in front, it may be sounded by worshippers to attract the deity's attention.

== Name ==
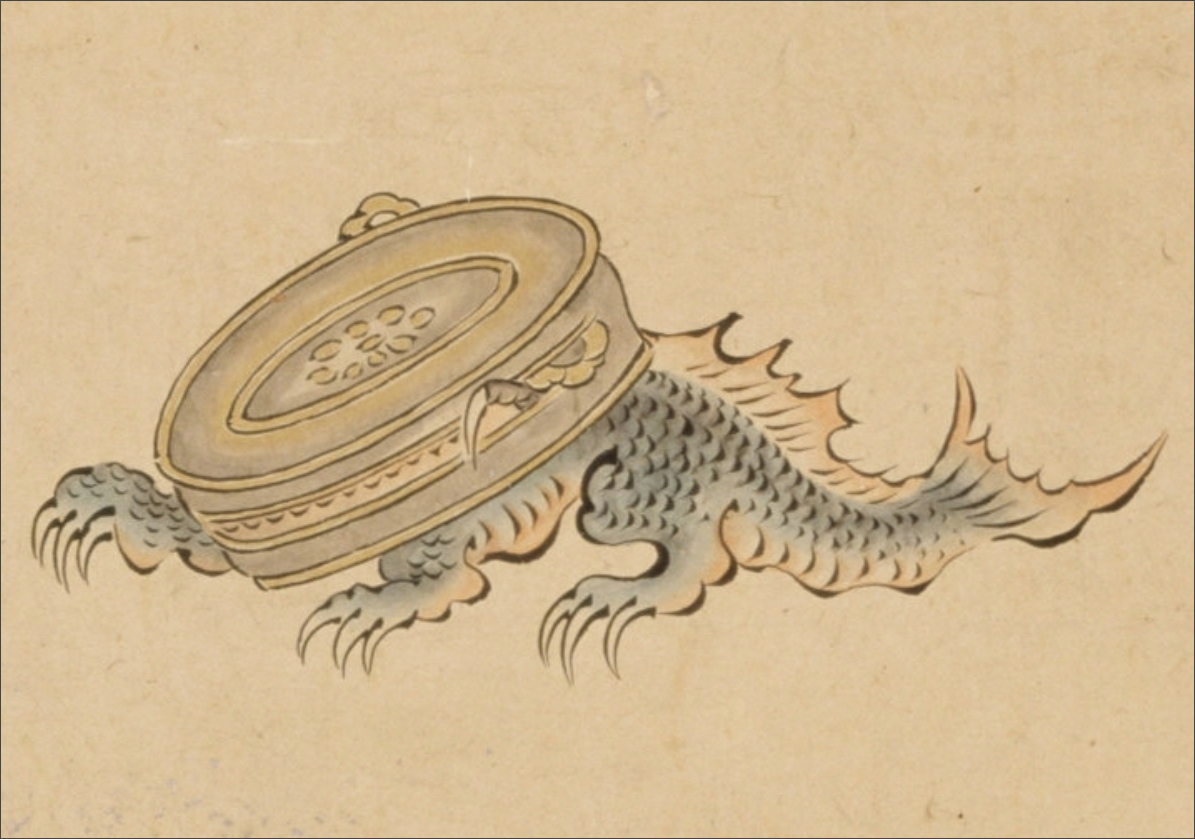
Yōkai in the form of a waniguchi; detail from an Edo-period picture scroll of the Night Parade of One Hundred Demons (National Museum of Japanese History)

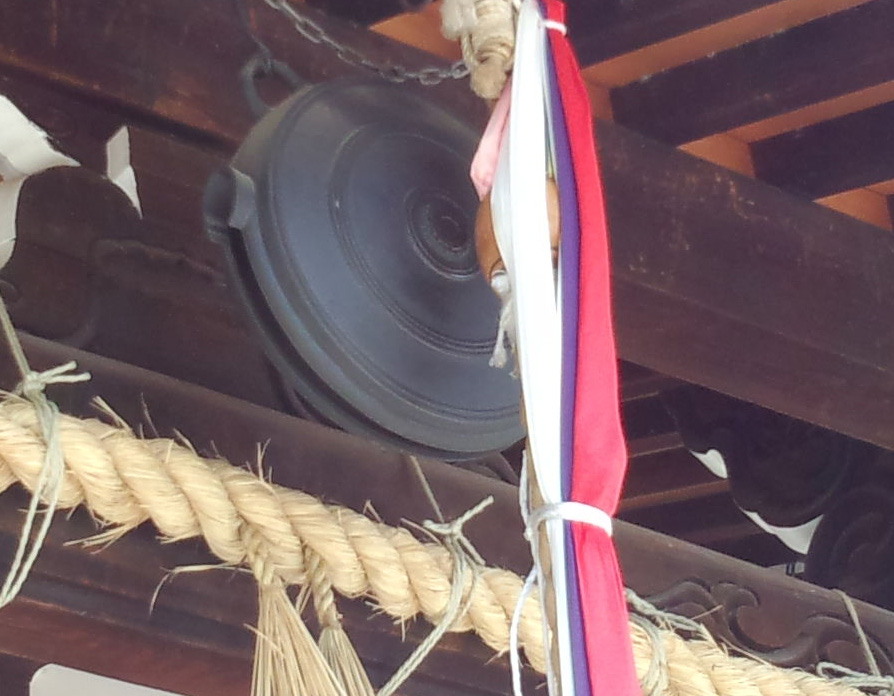
Waniguchi have a distinctive slit-mouth opening, as may be clearly seen in this example at Kisshō-in Tenman-gū (ja) in Kyōto

As denoted by its kanji, waniguchi literally means "crocodile (or alligator) mouth". It is so-named due to the instrument's striking visual resemblance.

On the earliest inscribed examples, what we now know of as waniguchi were referred to in a number of other ways, including "metal" (金, kon), "metal mouth" (金口, konku), and "metal drum" (金鼓, gonku).

The earliest inscribed instance of waniguchi written as it is today (鰐口) is on a bronze example at Ōtakayama Jinja (ja) in Ōgawara, Miyagi Prefecture. With a diameter of 43 centimetres (17 in), depth of 13 centimetres (5.1 in), and weighing some 32.5 kilograms (72 lb), the long inscription on both sides documents its dedication in Shōō 6 (1293). In recognition of its documentary significance, the waniguchi has been designated an Important Cultural Property.

== Ikkō Shōnin ==
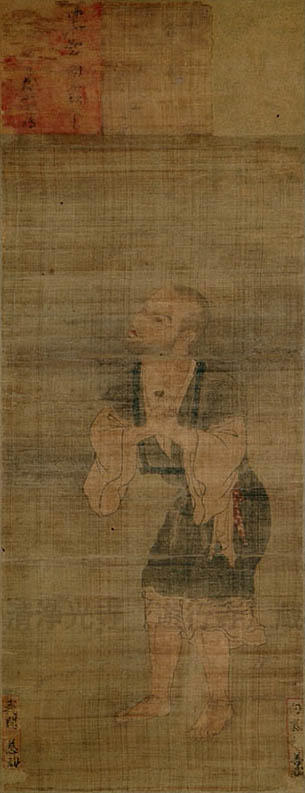
Kamakura-period portrait on silk of Ikkō Shōnin (ICP) (Shōjōkō-ji)

Developing the aquatic connections, an early fourteenth-century account of itinerant monk Ikkō, the Ikkō Shōnin denki (一向上人伝記), written in 1328 by a monk at Renge-ji (蓮華寺) on the subject of the temple's founder, relates an episode involving Ikkō, Hachiman, the Dragon King, and a waniguchi. According to this text, when Ikkō was performing odori (dancing) nembutsu at Usa Hachimangū, Hachiman appeared and gave him a waniguchi. When Ikkō was subsequently journeying to Shikoku, the Dragon King manifested himself and requested Ikkō's gong. The sea rough, he obliged, casting it into the turbulent waters. When Ikkō reached Sanuki, a "blue-robed child" appeared from the sea, declaring that due to the merit earned Ikkō would be released from suffering and have his waniguchi returned to him. A tortoise then appeared bearing it in his mouth and returned the lost item to Ikkō. A "tortoise tooth gong" is still in the keeping of Renge-ji today.

== Examples ==
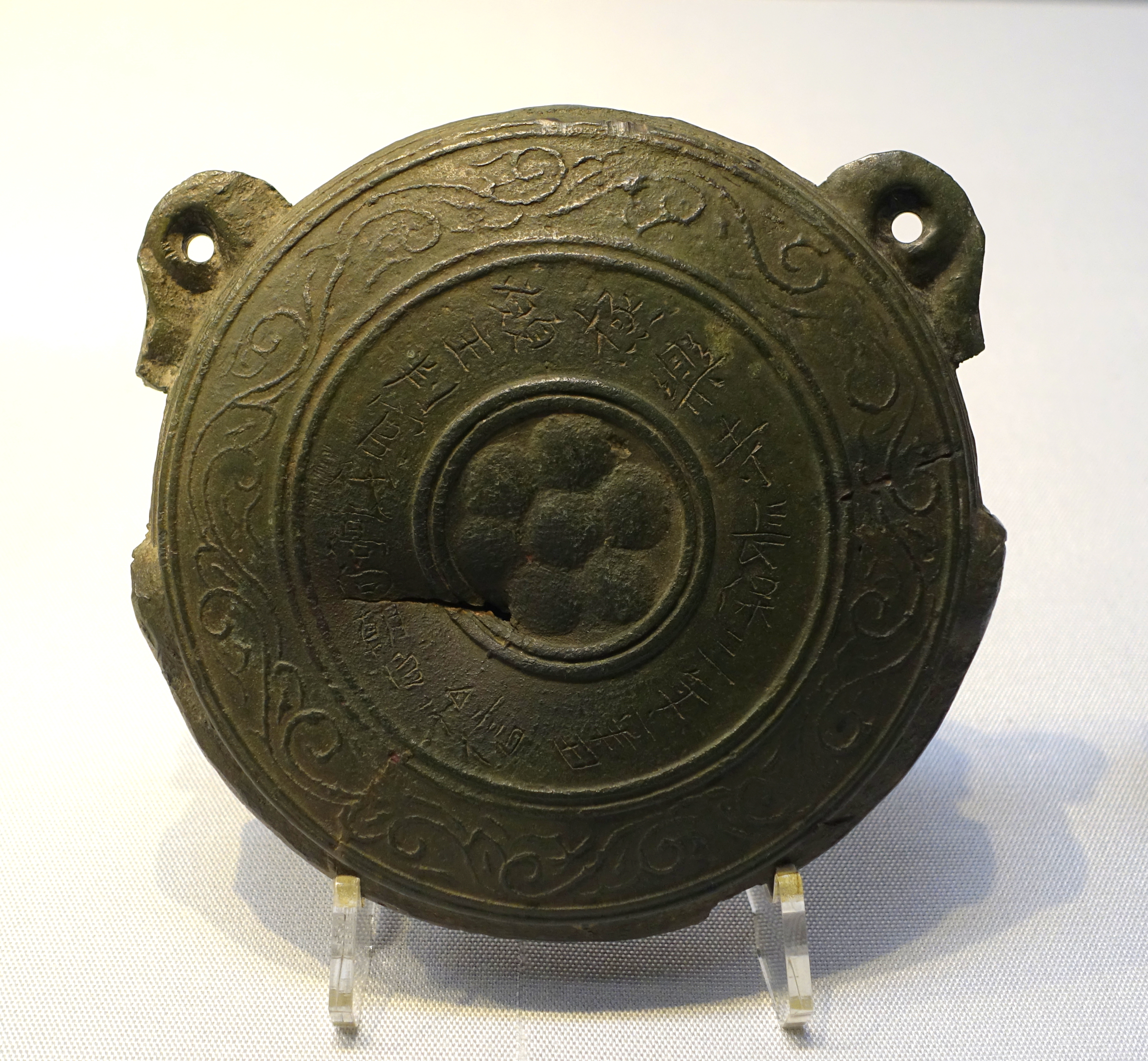
Bronze waniguchi dated by its inscription to 1001 (ICP) (Tokyo National Museum); waniguchi have a pair of rings (鈕, chū) on their shoulder for the cords by which they are strung

Waniguchi are usually made of copper or bronze, although iron examples may also be found.

The earliest waniguchi that can be dated from its inscription was excavated in Matsumoto, Nagano Prefecture, in 1939, in association with what is also the earliest kei gong (磬) that can dated from an inscription. Now in the Tokyo National Museum, it was cast in bronze with a striking area with a plum-blossom design on both front and back, surrounded by arabesque. The inscription documents its dedication by a court official to Gokuraku-ji in Chōhō 3 (1001), Yin Metal Ox. (Note: 「極楽寺長保三年辛丑」「願主信判官代高向朝臣弘」)

In all, thirteen waniguchi have been designated Important Cultural Properties, dated by their dedicatory inscriptions and located as follows:

- Chōhō 3 (1001), Tokyo National Museum
- Jōō 3 (1224), Myōō-ji (明王寺), Yamanashi Prefecture
- Antei 2 (1228), Ōmachi Alpine Museum (大町山岳博物館), Ōmachi (iron)
- Katei 2 (1236), Kiyomizu-dera, kept at Kyoto National Museum (iron)
- Kenchō 6 (1254), Nara National Museum (gilt bronze)
- Bun'ei 10 (1273), Kongō-ji (金剛寺), Tōkyō
- Bun'ei 10 (1274), Saikyō-ji (西教寺), Ōtsu
- Kōan 6 (1283), Matsuo-dera (松尾寺), Shiga Prefecture
- Shōō 6 (1293), Ōtakayama Jinja (大高山神社), Ōgawara
- Kamakura period, Tōdai-ji (no inscription)
- Shitoku 4 (1387), Kokoro-Shimizu Hachiman Jinja (心清水八幡神社), Aizubange
- Eishō 4 (1507), Rinnō-ji (gilt bronze)
- Tenbun 3 (1534), Ima Hachimangū (今八幡宮), Yamaguchi

== See also ==
- Suzu
- Shōko
- Kane
- Mokugyo
- Bonshō
- Wani (dragon)
