= Shichijō-in =

Fujiwara no Shokushi (藤原殖子; 1157–1228) was a Japanese noblewoman in the late Heian and early Kamakura periods. She may have been known in life as Taneko or Masuko, but today is primarily known by her in title Shichijō-in. After entering Buddhist orders she took the name Shinnyochi. She was the mother of Emperor Go-Toba.

== Life ==
Fujiwara no Shokushi was born in 1157. Her father was Bōmon Nobutaka, and her mother was Fujiwara no Kyūshi (藤原休子) of Fujiwara clan.

While serving Taira no Tokuko, the daughter of regent Taira no Kiyomori and wife of Emperor Takakura, she became naishi-no-suke ("Assistant Handmaid") to the emperor, and bore Prince Morisada and the future Emperor Go-Toba. In Kenkyū 1 (1190), she was of the Junior Third Rank and held the title of jusangū, she became a nyoin and took the title Shichijō-in (七条院). She took Buddhist orders in Genkyū 2 (1205), taking the dharma name Shinnyochi (真如智). According to the Gukanshō, her niece (by her younger brother Fujiwara no Nobukiyo) married the third Kamakura shōgun, Minamoto no Sanetomo.

She inherited a large amount of property (nyoin-ryō), which were known as Shichijō-in-ryō (七条院領).

Shokushi died on the 16th day of the ninth month of Antei 2 (15 October 1228 in the Julian calendar). After her death, the Shichijō-in-ryō would have passed to her son Go-Toba, but he was in exile on Oki after the Jōkyū War, so under his will they were passed to his concubine Fujiwara no Jūshi's son Emperor Juntoku's son Prince Yoshimune instead.

== Name ==
Like many Japanese noblewomen from the classical and medieval periods, the original reading for her given name is uncertain. Shokushi uses the on-yomi of the kanji for her name. This was read by the Japanologist Richard Ponsonby-Fane as "Masuko" but by historian Tomohiko Okano as "Taneko".
