= Princess Noriko (1177–1210) =

Princess Noriko 範子内親王

Empress consort of Japan
- Tenure: 10 April 1198 – 5 October 1206
- Born: 4 December 1177
- Died: 13 May 1210 (aged 32); Heian-kyō (Kyōto)
- House: Imperial House of Japan
- Father: Emperor Takakura
- Mother: Kogō-no-Tsubone

Princess Noriko (範子内親王; 4 December 1177 – 13 May 1210) was an Empress of Japan during the early Kamakura period. She was appointed honorary mother (junbo) of her nephew Emperor Tsuchimikado and served as empress from 1198 through 1206 during the early part of his reign.

She was the daughter of Emperor Takakura and Court Lady Kogō-no-Tsubone (小督局; b. 1157), Fujiwara no Shigenori's daughter. She was later known as Empress Dowager Bōmon-in (坊門院).

== Notes ==
Japanese royalty
Preceded by Fujiwara no Ninshi	Empress consort of Japan; 1198–1206	Succeeded by Fujiwara no Reishi
