= Fujiwara no Reishi =

Ōi no Mikado Reishi 大炊御門麗子

Empress consort of Japan
- Tenure: July 28, 1205 – April 14, 1210
- Born: 1185
- Died: November 1, 1243 (aged 57–58); Heian-kyō (Kyōto)
- Spouse: Emperor Tsuchimikado
- House: Imperial House of Japan
- Father: Fujiwara no Yorizane
- Mother: Fujiwara no Takako (藤原隆子)

Fujiwara no Reishi (藤原 麗子; 1185 – November 1, 1243), also known as Ōi no Mikado Reishi (大炊御門 麗子), was an empress consort of Japan. She was the consort of Emperor Tsuchimikado of Japan. Her honorary name was Onmei Mon'in (陰明門院).

In 1221, on the first month of the Jōkyū era she ordained as a Buddhist nun and received the Dharma name Seijōmyō (清浄妙).

== Notes ==
Japanese royalty
Preceded by Princess Noriko	Empress consort of Japan; 1205–1210	Succeeded by Princess Shōshi
