= Princess Shōshi (1195–1211) =

Princess Shōshi 昇子内親王

Empress consort of Japan
- Tenure: 19 September 1208 – 30 May 1209
- Born: 18 September 1195
- Died: 14 December 1211 (aged 16)
- House: Imperial House of Japan
- Father: Emperor Go-Toba
- Mother: Kujō Ninshi

Princess Shōshi (昇子内親王, Shōshi Naishinnō; 18 September 1195 – 14 December 1211), also known as Shunkamon-in (春華門院), was an Empress of Japan during the early Kamakura period. She was empress as the honorary mother (准母; junbo) of her brother, Emperor Juntoku.

== Notes ==
Japanese royalty
Preceded by Fujiwara no Reishi	Empress consort of Japan; 1208–1209	Succeeded by Fujiwara no Ritsushi
