= Karoku =

Period of Japanese history (1225–1227 CE)

Karoku (嘉禄) was a Japanese era name (年号, nengō, lit. "year name") after Gennin and before Antei. This period spanned the years from April 1225 to December 1227. The reigning emperor was Go-Horikawa-tennō (後堀河天皇).

== Change of era ==
- 1225 Karoku gannen (嘉禄元年): The era name was changed to mark an event or a number of events. The previous era ended and a new one commenced in Gennin 2.

== Events of the Karoku Era ==
- 1225 (Karoku 1, 11th month): At Kamakura, Kujō Yoritsune's coming of age ceremonies took place at age 8; but control of all bakufu affairs remained entirely in the hands of Hōjō Yasutoki, the regent (shikken).
- 1225 (Karoku 1, 12th month): Emperor Go-Horikawa went in formal procession to Iwashimizu Hachiman-gū and to the Kamo Shrines.
- 1226 (Karoku 2, 1st month): The Emperor raised Yoritsune to the first rank of the fifth class in the apex of artistocratic court hierarchy (the dōjō kuge).

== Notes ==
| Preceded by Gennin | Era or nengō Karoku; 1225–1227 | Succeeded by Antei |
