= Kennin (disambiguation) =

Kennin is a Japanese era name.

Kennin or 建仁 may also refer to:

- Kennin-ji, Japanese historic Zen Buddhist temple
- Chien-jen, Chinese given name of Chen Chien-jen, Taiwanese epidemiologist and politician
