= Ken'ei =

Period of Japanese history (1206–1207 CE)

Ken'ei (建永) was a Japanese era name (年号, nengō, lit. "year name") after Genkyū and before Jōgen. This period spanned the years from April 1206 through October 1207. The reigning emperor was Tsuchimikado-tennō (土御門天皇).

== Change of era ==
- 1206 Ken'ei gannen (建永元年): The new era name was created to mark an event or a number of events. The previous era ended and a new one commenced in Genkyū 3, on the 27th day of the 4th month of 1206.

== Events of the Ken'ei era ==
- 1206 (Ken'ei 1, 2nd month): Shōgun Minamoto no Sanetomo's standing at court was raised to the 2nd rank of the 4th class.
- 1206 (Ken'ei 1, 7th day of the 3rd month): The emperor planned to pay a visit to the sesshō Kujō Yoshitsune, but in the night before this visit, an unknown assassin was introduced secretly into Yoshitune's house, and he was stabbed by a spear pushed up from below the floor. No one was able to discover the perpetrator. Yoshitsune was then aged 38 years. The sadaijin Konoe Iezane succeeded Yoshitsune as sesshō; and the dainagon Fujiwara no Tadatsune became sadaijin.
- 1206 (Ken'ei 1, 12th month): Konoe Iezane ceases to function as sesshō (regent); and instead, he becomes kampaku (chancellor).

== Notes ==
Preceded by Genkyū	Era or nengō Ken'ei; 1206–1207	Succeeded by Jōgen
