= Princess Kuniko =

Princess Kuniko 邦子内親王

Empress consort of Japan
- Tenure: January 14, 1222 – September 18, 1224
- Born: 1209
- Died: September 26, 1283 (aged 73–74); Heian-kyō (Kyōto)
- House: Imperial House of Japan
- Father: Imperial Prince Morisada
- Mother: Kitashirakawa-in

Princess Kuniko (邦子内親王; 1209 – 26, September 1283), also known as Princess Hoshi and Ankamon-in (安嘉門院), was an Empress of Japan during the Kamakura period. She was empress as the honorary mother (准母; junbo) of her brother, Emperor Go-Horikawa.

== Biography ==
She was the daughter of Imperial Prince Morisada (守貞親王; 1179–1223) and Kitashirakawa-in, and thus granddaughter of Emperor Takakura.

In 1221, her brother Emperor Go-Horikawa became Emperor, and she was named his Honorary Empress.

She also acted as the surrogate mother of Emperor Kameyama.

She became a nun in 1235.

== Notes ==
Japanese royalty
Preceded by Fujiwara no Ritsushi	Empress consort of Japan; 1221–1224	Succeeded by Fujiwara no Ariko
