= Minase Shrine =

Shinto shrine in Osaka Prefecture, Japan

Minase Shrine 水無瀬神宮
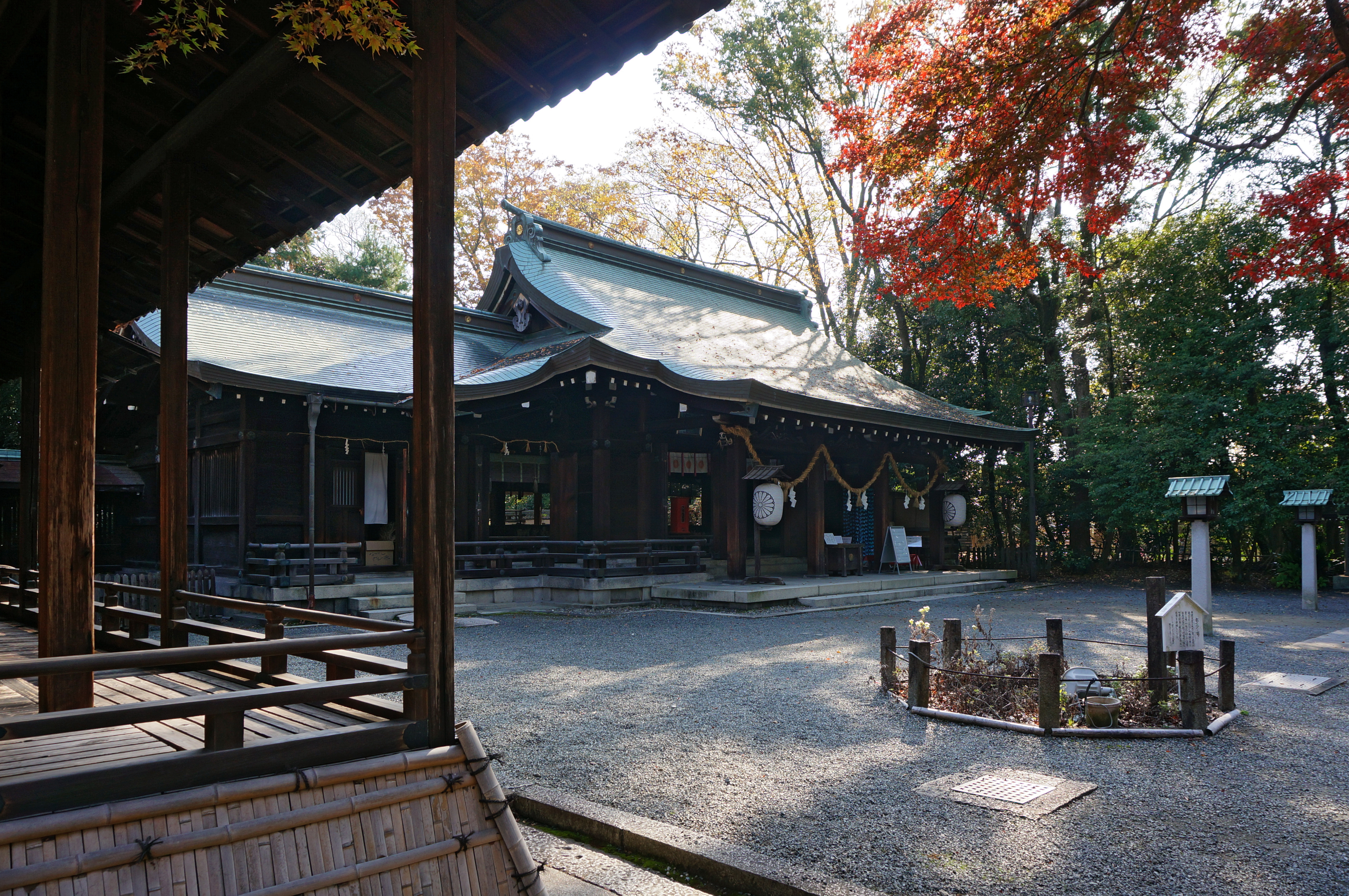

- Location within Japan

Religion
- Affiliation: Shinto
- Deity: Emperor Go-Toba, Emperor Tsuchimikado and Emperor Juntoku
- Type: Kanpei Chūsha

Location
- Interactive map of Minase Shrine 水無瀬神宮
- Coordinates: 34.8849°N 135.673°E

Architecture
- Established: 1240

Minase Shrine (水無瀬神宮, Minase jingū) is a Shinto Shrine in Shimamoto, Osaka

The Shrine is dedicated to the veneration of the kami of Emperor Go-Toba, Emperor Tsuchimikado and Emperor Juntoku. In the struggle with the Kamakura shogunate, the three historical figures are united by one common factor—each was overpowered and banished from the Imperial center in Kyoto: Go-Toba was banished to Oki Island, where he died. Tsuchimikado felt compelled to abandon Kyoto, traveling first to Tosa province (now known as Kōchi Prefecture); and later, he removed himself to Awa province, where he died in exile. Juntoku was forced to end his days at Sado Island. In 1873, the kami of Go-Daigo and Tushimikado were enshrined, and the kami of Juntoku was enshrined in 1874.

== Kanpei-sha ==
In 1871, the Kanpei-sha (官幣社) identified the hierarchy of government-supported shrines most closely associated with the Imperial family. The kampeisha were shrines venerated by the imperial family. This category encompasses those sanctuaries enshrining emperors, imperial family members, or meritorious retainers of the Imperial family. Up through 1940, the mid-range of Imperial shrines or Kanpei-chūsha (官幣中社) included the shrine; and it was then known as Minase-gū In 1940, Minase's status was changed Kanpei-taisha (官幣大社), which is the highest rank; and since then, it has been known as Minase jingū.

== See also ==
- List of Jingū
- Modern system of ranked Shinto Shrines
- List of National Treasures of Japan (ancient documents)
