= Prince Morisada =

Japanese prince (1179–1223)

Prince Morisada 守貞親王
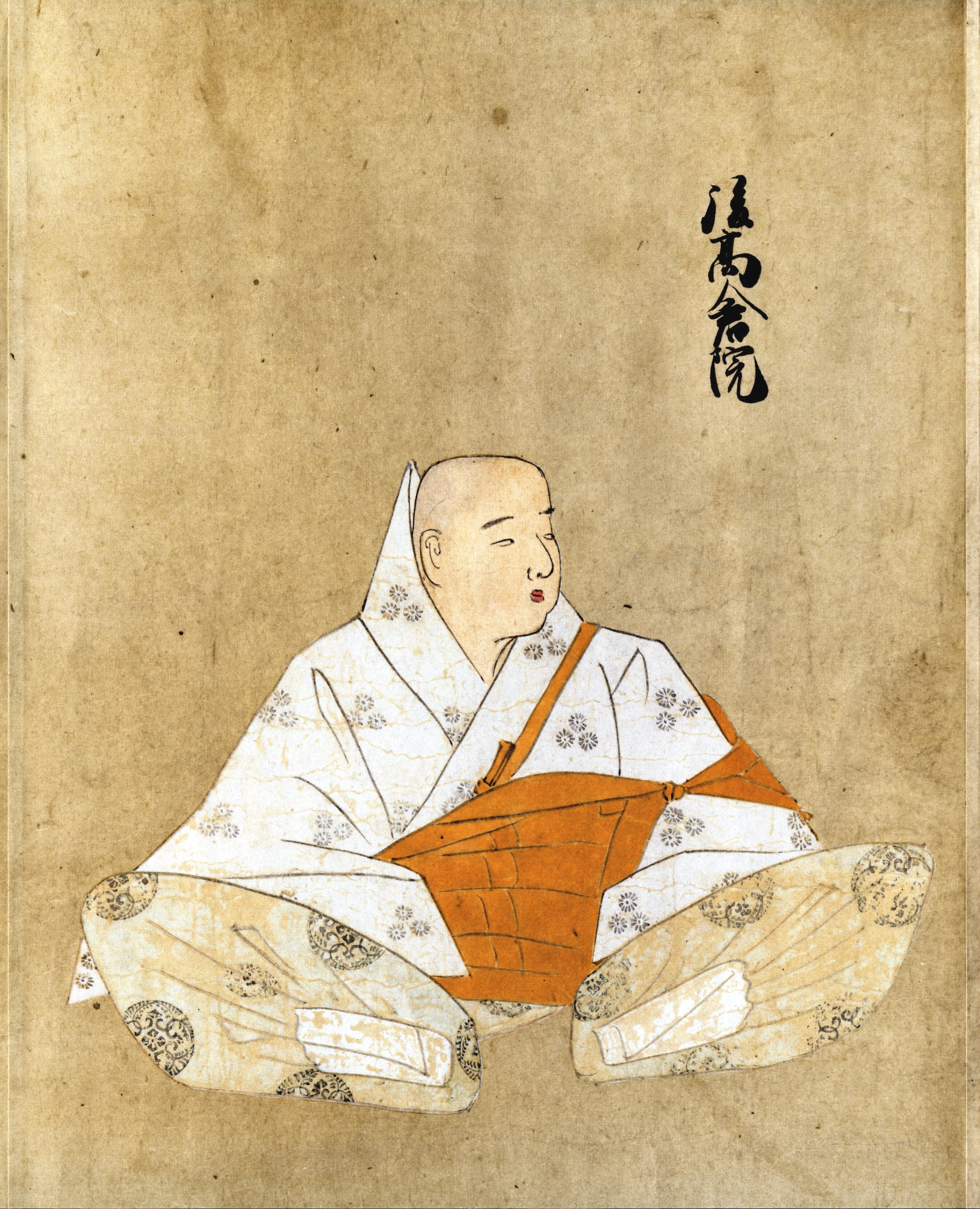
- Go-Takakura-in
- Born: 6 April 1179; Japan
- Died: 14 June 1223 (aged 44); Japan
- Issue: Princess Kuniko; Princess Rishi
- Father: Emperor Takakura
- Mother: Bōmon Shokushi

Prince Morisada (6 April 1179 – 14 June 1223) was a Japanese prince and retired emperor during the early Kamakura period of Japan. He was the second son of Emperor Takakura and a lady-in-waiting. He was the father of Emperor Go-Horikawa and served as retired emperor from 1221 until his death in 1223.

== History ==
After the defeat of the Taira, he was one of the candidates for the Chrysanthemum Throne considered by the retired emperor Go-Shirakawa. Morisada had been retrieved from the retreating Taira ship at the end of the Genpei War. He was taken with the ship as he had been raised by Kiyomori's wife Tokiko. After his capture he was placed under the care of Empress Jōsaimon-in. After the Jōkyū Disturbance, he was made retired emperor by the bakufu, ostensibly to follow precedent of having a titular and retired emperor. In reality it was to decide the Imperial succession itself, as the precedent also was that the retired emperor was the father of the titular emperor, so his son was made Emperor Go-Horikawa.
