= Emperor Tsuchimikado =

Emperor of Japan from 1198 to 1210

Emperor Tsuchimikado 土御門天皇
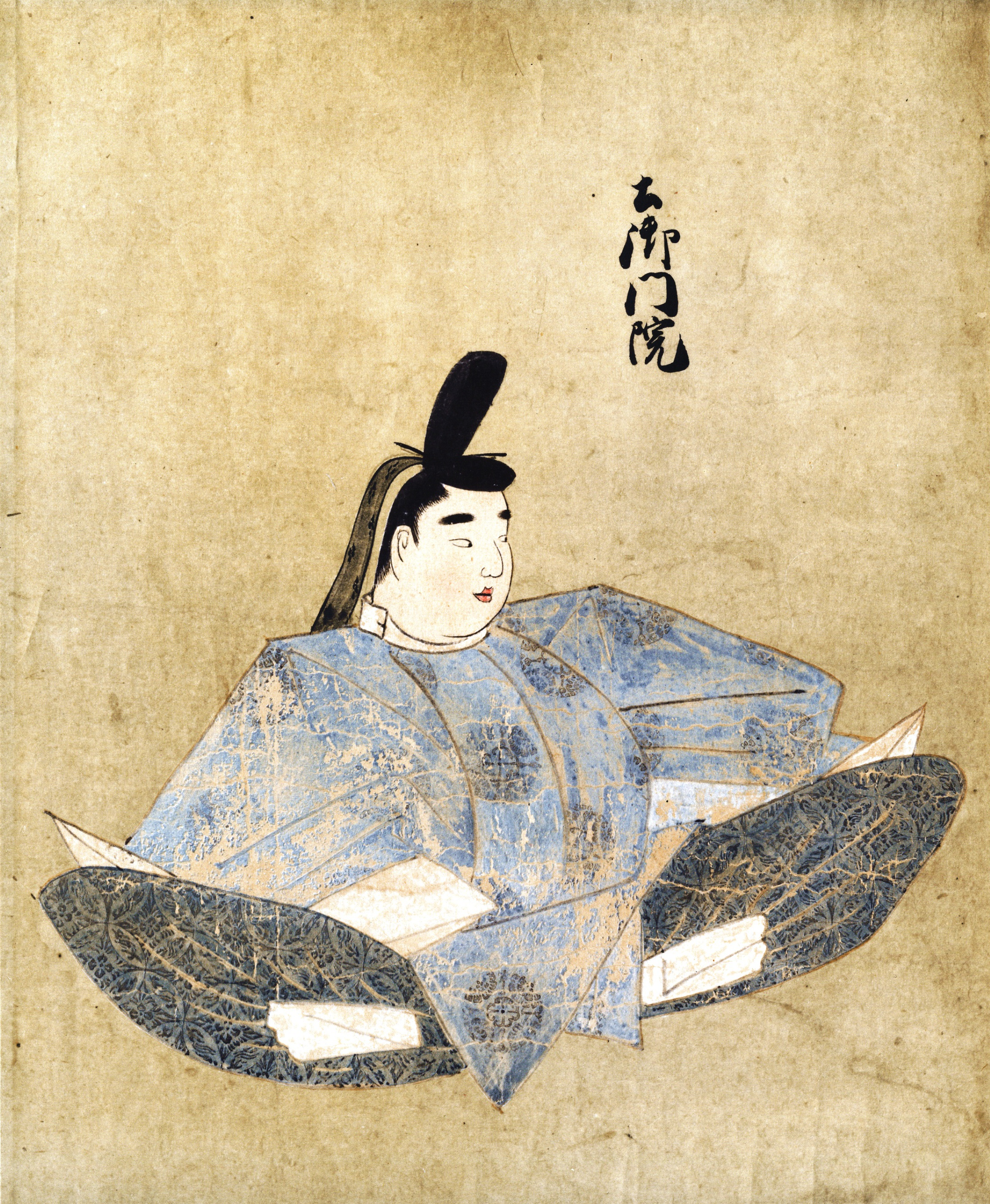
- Portrait from the Tenshi Sekkan Miei

Emperor of Japan
- Reign: 18 February 1198 – 12 December 1210
- Enthronement: 10 April 1198
- Predecessor: Go-Toba
- Successor: Juntoku
- Shōgun: Minamoto no Yoritomo; Minamoto no Yoriie; Minamoto no Sanetomo
- Born: 3 January 1196
- Died: 6 November 1231 (aged 35); Itano, Awa Province
- Burial: Kanegahara no misasagi (金原陵) (Kyoto)
- Spouse: Fujiwara no Reishi
- Issue more...: Emperor Go-Saga
Posthumous name
- Tsuigō: Emperor Tsuchimikado (土御門院 or 土御門天皇)
- House: Imperial House of Japan
- Father: Emperor Go-Toba
- Mother: Minamoto no Ariko

Emperor Tsuchimikado (土御門天皇, Tsuchimikado-tennō; 3 January 1196 – 6 November 1231) was the 83rd emperor of Japan, according to the traditional order of succession.

Tsuchimikado's reign spanned the years from 1198 through 1210.

== Genealogy ==
Before Tsuchimikado's accession to the Chrysanthemum Throne, his personal name (imina) was Tamehito-shinnō (為仁親王). He was the firstborn son of Emperor Go-Toba. His mother was Ariko (在子) (1171–1257), daughter of Minamoto no Michichika (源通親).

Tsuchimikado's Imperial family lived with him in the Dairi of the Heian Palace. His family included three sons by three different consorts:

- Empress (Chūgū): Ōinomikado (Fujiwara) no Reishi (大炊御門（藤原）麗子) later Onmeimon'in (陰明門院), Ōinomikado Yorisane's daughter
- Lady-in-waiting: Tsuchimikado (Minamoto) no Michiko (土御門（源）通子; d.1221), Minamoto Michimumen's daughter
  - First daughter: Princess Haruko (春子女王; 1210–1230)
  - Second daughter: Imperial Princess Akiko (覚子内親王; 1213–1285) later Ogimachi'in (正親町院)
  - Third son: Imperial Prince Priest Ninjo (仁助法親王; 1215–1262)
  - Fourth son: Imperial Prince Priest Jojin (静仁法親王; 1216–1296)
  - Sixth son: Prince Kunihito (邦仁王), later Emperor Go-Saga
- Court Lady: Mimasaka-Naishi (美作掌侍), Takashina Nakasuke's daughter
  - Princess
  - Son: Imperial Prince Priest Donin (道仁法親王; 1209-1263)
- Court Lady: Minamoto Sadamitsu's daughter
  - Fifth daughter: Princess Hideko (秀子女王)
- Court Lady: Owari-no-Tsubone (尾張局), Priest's daughter
  - Son: Imperial Prince Priest Sonsyu (尊守法親王; 1210-1260)
- Court Lady: Priest Shine's daughter
  - Son: Imperial Prince Priest Sonjo (尊助法親王; 1217-1290)
- Court Lady: Jibukyo-no-tsubone (治部卿局), Priest's Daughter
  - Son: Imperial Prince Priest Dōen (道円法親王; 1210-1240)
  - Daughter: Princess Nobuko (信子女王)
- Court Lady: Omiya-no-Tsubone (大宮局), Minamoto Arimasa's daughter
  - Daughter: Imperial Princess Teruko (曦子内親王) later Senkamon-in (仙華門院)
- Court Lady: (Fujiwara), Priest's Daughter
  - Son: Imperial Prince Priest Sainin (最仁法親王; 1227-1295)
- Court Lady: Kunaikyō-no-tsubone (宮内卿局), Fujiwara Norimitsu's daughter
  - Daughter: Princess Tomoko (知子女王)
- Court Lady: (Fujiwara), Priest's Daughter
  - Son: Zojin
- Court Lady: Sakyōdaibu-no-Tsubone, Priest's Daughter
  - Daughter: Imperial Princess Junko (諄子内親王; d.1260)
- Court Lady: Tanba-no-Tsubone, Priest's Daughter
  - Daughter: Princess Koreko (是子女王)
- Mother Unknown:
  - daughter, adopted by Prince Hokuroku
  - Kaison (懐尊)
  - Jakue (寂恵)

== Events of Tsuchimikado's life ==
In 1198, he became emperor upon the abdication of Emperor Go-Toba, who continued to exercise Imperial powers as cloistered emperor.

- 18 February 1198 (Kenkyū 9, 11th day of the 1st month): In the 15th year of Go-Toba-tennō's reign (後鳥羽天皇十五年), the emperor abdicated; and the succession (senso) was received by his eldest son.
- 1198 (Kenkyū 9, 3rd month): Emperor Tsuchimikado is said to have acceded to the throne (sokui).
- 1199: Shortly after Tsuchimikado's reign began, Minamoto no Yoritomo died.
- 1203: Yoritomo's successor as head of the Kamakura shogunate, Minamoto no Yoriie, was assassinated; and former emperor Go-Toba was responsible for good relations with the shogunate when it was headed by Minamoto no Sanetomo from 1203 through 1219.
- 1210: Go-Toba persuaded Tsuchimikado to abdicate in favor of his younger brother, who would become known as Emperor Juntoku.

In Kyōto, Minamoto no Michichika took power as steward, and in Kamakura, in 1199, upon the death of Minamoto no Yoritomo, Hōjō Tokimasa began to rule as Gokenin.

Tsuchimikado removed himself from Kyoto, traveling first to Tosa Province (now known as Kōchi Prefecture); and later, he moved to Awa province (now known as Tokushima Prefecture), where he died in exile.

- 1231: The former emperor died at age 35.

Tsuchimikado's official Imperial tomb is in Kyoto. The emperor is venerated at a memorial Shinto shrine (misasagi). This mausoleum shrine is formally named Kanegahara no misasagi.

=== Kugyō ===
Kugyō (公卿) is a collective term for the very few most powerful men attached to the court of the Emperor of Japan in pre-Meiji eras.

In general, this elite group included only three to four men at a time. These were hereditary courtiers whose experience and background would have brought them to the pinnacle of a life's career. During Tsuchimikado's reign, this apex of the Daijō-kan included:

- Sesshō, Konoe Motomichi, 1160–1233.
- Sesshō, Kujō Yoshitsune, 1169–1206.
- Daijō-daijin, Kujō Yoshitsune.
- Sadaijin
- Udaijin
- Naidaijin
- Dainagon

== Eras of Tsuchimikado's reign ==
The years of Tschuimikado's reign are more specifically identified by more than one era name or nengō.

- Kenkyū (1190–1199)
- Shōji (1199–1201)
- Kennin (1201–1204)
- Genkyū (1204–1206)
- Ken'ei (1206–1207)
- Jōgen (1207–1211)

== Ancestry ==
Ancestors of Emperor Tsuchimikado

8. Emperor Go-Shirakawa (1127-1192)
4. Emperor Takakura (1161-1181)
9. Taira no Shigeko (1142-1176)
2. Emperor Go-Toba (1180-1239)
10. Bōmon (Fujiwara no) Nobutaka (1126-1179)
5. Shichijō-in (Fujiwara no Shokushi) (1157-1228)
11. Fujiwara no Kyūshi
1. Emperor Tsuchimikado
12. Fujiwara no Akinori (1098-1151)
6. Nōen (1140-1199)
3. Minamoto no Ariko (1171-1257)

== See also ==
- Emperor of Japan
- List of Emperors of Japan
- Imperial cult
- Emperor Go-Tsuchimikado
- Minase Shrine

== Notes ==
Japanese Imperial kamon — a stylized chrysanthemum blossom

Regnal titles
Preceded by Emperor Go-Toba	Emperor of Japan: Tsuchimikado; 1198–1210	Succeeded by Emperor Juntoku
