= Angen =

Period of Japanese history (1175–1177 CE)

Angen (安元) was a Japanese era name (年号, nengō; lit. "year name") after Jōan and before Jishō. This period spanned the years from July 1175 through August 1177. The reigning emperor was Takakura-tennō (高倉天皇).

== Change of era ==
- 1175 Angen gannen (安元元年): The new era name was created to mark an event or series of events. The previous era ended and a new one commenced in Jōan 5, on the 28th day of the 7th month of 1175.

== Events of the Angen era ==
- 1175 (Angen 1, 22nd day of the 2nd month): the naidaijin Minamoto no Masamichi died at age 58.
- 1175 (Angen 1, 11th month): Fujiwara no Moronaga was named naidaijin.
- 1176 (Angen 2, 3rd month): Emperor Takakura visited his father, former-Emperor Go-Shirakawa, on the occasion of his 50th birthday.
- 1176 (Angen 2, 19th day of the 7th month): The former-Emperor Rokujō died at the age of 13; and also in this same month, Takakura's mother, Empress Kenshun-mon In (formerly Taira Sigeko) died.
- 1176 (Angen 2, 7th month): Fujiwara no Morotaka, daimyō of Kaga, was in a dispute with the priests of Mt. Hiei; and his younger brother, Fujiwara no Morotsune, set fire to some of the temple buildings. The priests complained to the emperor, demanding that Morotaka be exiled and the Morotsune should be put in prison. However, because Fujiwara no Seiko, the father of these two brothers, was a great friend of Go-Shirakawa, the affair was allowed to lie dormant.
- May 27, 1177 (Angen 3, 28th day, 4th month): A fire burned the university structure to ashes during The Great Fire of Angen.

== Notes ==
| Preceded by Jōan | Era or nengō Angen; 1175–1177 | Succeeded by Jishō |
