= Emperor Juntoku =

Emperor of Japan (r. 1210–1221)

Emperor Juntoku 順徳天皇
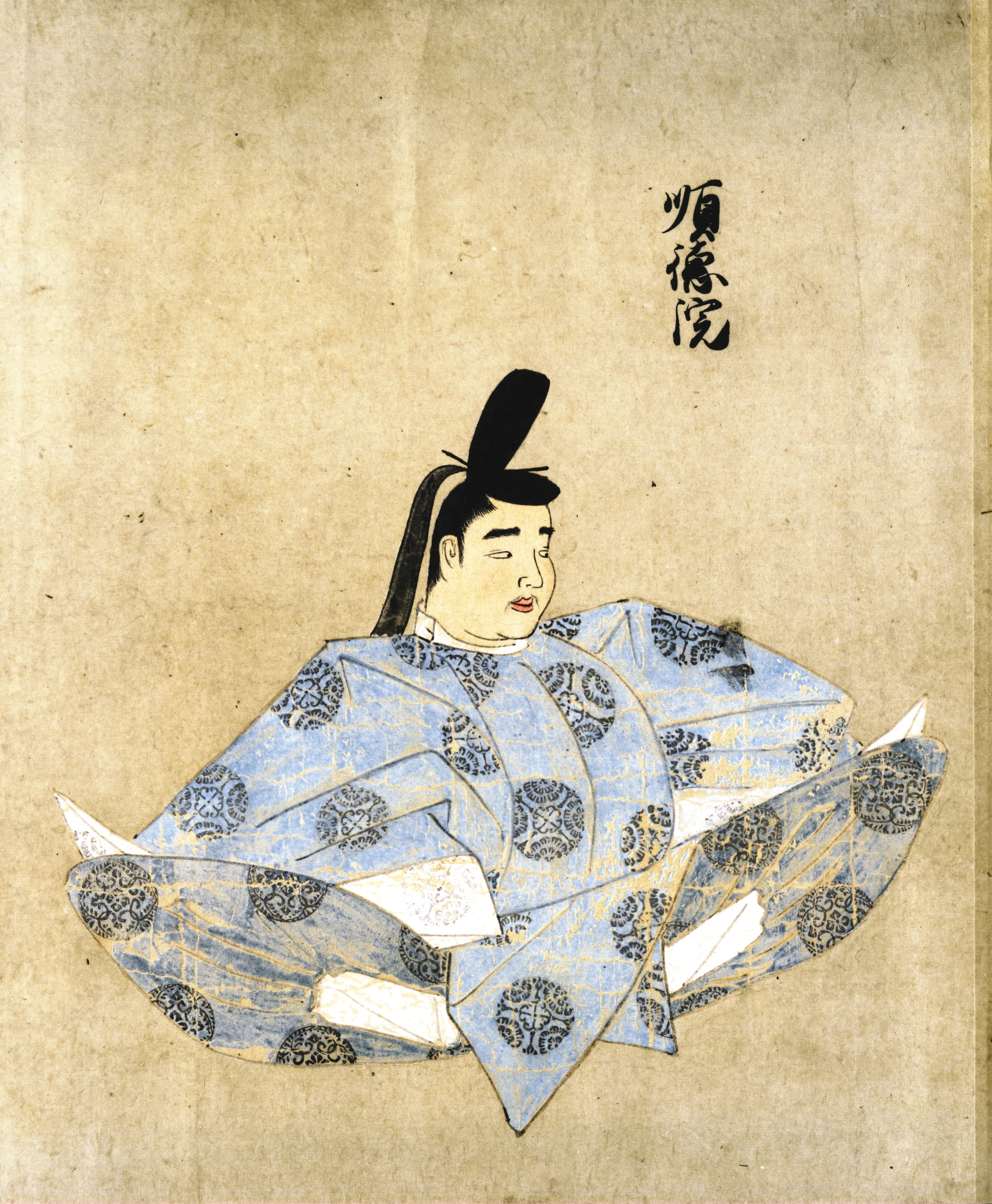
- Portrait from the Tenshi Sekkan Miei

Emperor of Japan
- Reign: 12 December 1210 – 13 May 1221
- Enthronement: 14 January 1211
- Predecessor: Tsuchimikado
- Successor: Chūkyō
- Shōgun: Minamoto no Sanetomo
- Born: 22 October 1197
- Died: 7 October 1242 (aged 44); Sado Island, Kamakura shogunate
- Burial: Ōhara no Misasagi (大原陵) (Kyoto)
- Spouse: Fujiwara no Ritsushi (m. 1211)
- Issue more...: Emperor Chūkyō
Posthumous name
- Chinese-style shigō: Emperor Juntoku (順徳院 or 順徳天皇)
- House: Imperial House of Japan
- Father: Emperor Go-Toba
- Mother: Fujiwara no Shigeko

Emperor Juntoku (順徳天皇, Juntoku-tennō) (22 October 1197 – 7 October 1242) of the Jōgen (Kamakura period) was the 84th emperor of Japan, according to the traditional order of succession. His reign spanned the years from 1210 through 1221, a part of Japan's Kamakura Period.

== Genealogy ==
Before his ascension to the Chrysanthemum Throne, his personal name (his imina) was Morinari-shinnō (守成親王).

He was the third son of Emperor Go-Toba. His mother was Shigeko (重子), the daughter of Fujiwara Hanki (藤原範季)

- Empress (chūgū): Kujō Fujiwara no Ritsushi (?) (九条（藤原）立子) later Higashiichijō-in (東一条院), Kujo Yoshitsune's daughter
  - Second daughter: Imperial Princess Taiko (諦子内親王; 1217–1243) later Gekgimon'in (明義門院)
  - Third son: Imperial Prince Kanenari (懐成親王) later Emperor Chūkyō
- Lady-in-waiting: Toku-Naishi (督典侍), Fujiwara Norimitsu's Daughter
  - Fourth son: Prince Hikonari (彦成王; 1219–1286)
  - Sixth son: Imperial Prince Yoshimune (善統親王; 1233–1317)
- Consort: Fujiwara Noriko (藤原位子), Bomon Nobukiyo's daughter
  - First Daughter: Imperial Princess Jōko (穠子内親王; 1216-1279）later Eianmon'in（永安門院)
- Consort: Fujiwara Kiyotaka's Daughter
  - First Son: Imperial Prince Priest Sonkaku (尊覚法親王; 1215–1264)
  - Second Son: Imperial Prince Priest Kaku'e (覚恵法親王; b.1217)
  - Fifth son: Prince Iwakura no Miya Tadanari (岩倉宮忠成王; 1222–1279)
- Consort: Saishō-no-Tsubone (宰相局), Priest's daughter
  - Son: Kangan Giin
- Mother unknown:
  - Daughter: Princess Yoshiko (慶子女王; 1225-1286）
  - Daughter: Princess Tadako (忠子女王; 1232-1249）
  - Son: Prince Chitose (千歳宮; 1237-1254）

== Events of Juntoku's life ==
Morinari-shinnō became Crown Prince in 1200. He was elevated to the throne after Emperor Go-Toba pressured Emperor Tsuchimikado into abdicating.

- 12 December 1210 (Jōgen 1, 25th day of the 11th month): In the 12th year of Tsuchimikado-tennō's reign (土御門天皇十二年), the emperor abdicated; and the succession (senso) was received by his younger brother, the second son of the former-Emperor Go-Toba. Shortly thereafter, Emperor Juntoku is said to have acceded to the throne (sokui).

In actuality, Emperor Go-Toba wielded effective power as a cloistered emperor during the years of Juntoku's reign.

In 1221, he was forced to abdicate because of his participation in Go-Toba's unsuccessful attempt to displace the Kamakura bakufu with re-asserted Imperial power. This political and military struggle was called the Jōkyū War or the Jōkyū Incident (Jōkyū-no ran).

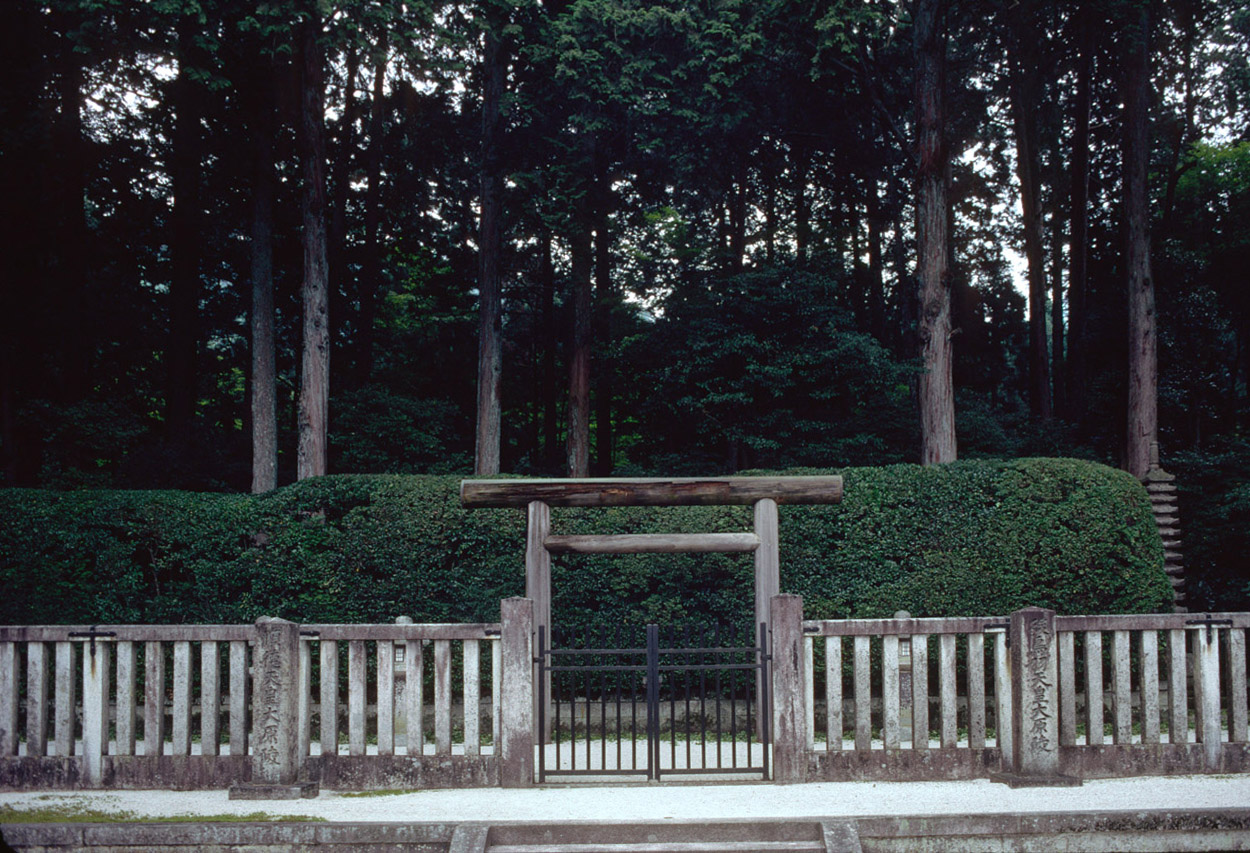
Imperial tomb of Emperor Juntoku and Emperor Go-Toba, Kyoto

After the Jōkyū-no ran, Juntoku was sent into exile on Sado Island (佐渡島 or 佐渡ヶ島, both Sadogashima), where he remained until his death in 1242.

This emperor is known posthumously as Sado-no In (佐渡院) because his last years were spent at Sado. He was buried in a mausoleum, the Mano Goryo, on Sado's west coast. Juntoku's official Imperial tomb (misasagi) is in Kyoto.

Juntoku was tutored in poetry by Fujiwara no Sadaie, who was also known as Teika. One of the emperor's poems was selected for inclusion in what became a well-known anthology, the Ogura Hyakunin Isshu. This literary legacy in Teika's collection of poems has accorded Juntoku a continuing popular prominence beyond the scope of his other lifetime achievements. The poets and poems of the Hyakunin isshu form the basis for a card game (uta karuta) which is still widely played today.

=== Kugyō ===
Kugyō (公卿) is a collective term for the very few most powerful men attached to the court of the Emperor of Japan in pre-Meiji eras.

In general, this elite group included only three to four men at a time. These were hereditary courtiers whose experience and background would have brought them to the pinnacle of a life's career. During juntoku's reign, this apex of the Daijō-kan included:

- Kampaku, Konoe Iezane, d. 1242.
- Sadaijin
- Udaijin
- Nadaijin
- Dainagon

== Eras of Juntoku's reign ==
The years of Juntoku's reign are more specifically identified by more than one era name or nengō.

- Jōgen (1207–1211)
- Kenryaku (1211–1213)
- Kempō (1213–1219)
- Jōkyū (1219–1222)

== Ancestry ==
Ancestors of Emperor Juntoku

8. Emperor Go-Shirakawa (1127-1192)
4. Emperor Takakura (1161-1181)
9. Taira no Shigeko (1142-1176)
2. Emperor Go-Toba (1180-1239)
10. Bōmon (Fujiwara no) Nobutaka (1126-1179)
5. Shichijō-in (Fujiwara no Shokushi) (1157-1228)
11. Fujiwara no Kyūshi
1. Emperor Juntoku
12. Fujiwara no Yoshikane (1086-1139)
6. Fujiwara no Norisue (1130-1205)
13. Takashina
3. Fujiwara no Shigeko (1182-1264)
14. Taira no Norimori (1128-1185)
7. Taira no Noriko

== See also ==
- Emperor of Japan
- List of Emperors of Japan
- Imperial cult

== Notes ==
Japanese Imperial kamon — a stylized chrysanthemum blossom

Regnal titles
Preceded by Emperor Tsuchimikado	Emperor of Japan: Juntoku; 1210–1221	Succeeded by Emperor Chūkyō
