= Fujiwara no Ritsushi =

Kujō Ritsushi 九条立子

Empress consort of Japan
- Tenure: 7 February 1211 – 8 May 1222
- Born: 1192
- Died: 18 January 1248 (aged 55–56); Heian-kyō (Kyōto)
- Spouse: Emperor Juntoku (m. 1211; died 1242)
- Issue: Princess Taiko; Emperor Chūkyō
- House: Imperial House of Japan
- Father: Kujō Yoshitsune

Fujiwara no Ritsushi (九条立子; 1192 – 18 January 1248) was Empress of Japan as the consort of Emperor Juntoku.

In 1226, she ordained as a Buddhist nun and received the Dharma name Seijōkan (清浄観).

Children:

- Second daughter: Imperial Princess Taiko (?) (諦子内親王)
- Fourth son: Imperial Prince Kanenari (懐成親王) (Emperor Chūkyō)

== Notes ==
Japanese royalty
Preceded by Princess Shōshi	Empress consort of Japan; 1211–1222	Succeeded by Princess Kuniko
