= Konoe Nagako =

Konoe Nagako 近衛長子

Empress consort of Japan
- Tenure: August 23, 1226 – May 12, 1229
- Born: 1218
- Died: March 9, 1275 (aged 56–57); Heian-kyō (Kyōto)
- Spouse: Emperor Go-Horikawa (m. 1226; died 1234)
- House: Imperial House of Japan
- Father: Konoe Iezane

Konoe Nagako (近衛長子; 1218 – March 9, 1275) also known as Takatsukasa-in (鷹司院), was Empress of Japan as the consort of Emperor Go-Horikawa.

== Notes ==
Japanese royalty
Preceded by Fujiwara no Ariko	Empress consort of Japan; 1226–1229	Succeeded by Kujō Shunshi
