= Jōgen (Kamakura period) =

Period of Japanese history (1207–1211 CE)

Jōgen (承元) was a Japanese era name (年号, nengō; lit. "year name") after Ken'ei and before Kenryaku. This period spanned the years from October 1207 through March 1211. The reigning emperors were Tsuchimikado-tennō (土御門天皇) and Juntoku-tennō (順徳天皇).

== Change of era ==
- 1207 Jōgen gannen (承元元年); 1207: The new era name was created to mark an event or a number of events. The previous era ended and a new one commenced in Ken'ei 2, on the 25th day of the 10th month of 1207.

== Events of the Jōgen era ==
- 1208 (Jōgen 2, 6th month): The emperor went to the Kumano Sanzan Shrine.
- 1210 (Jōgen 4, 5th month): The emperor returned to the Kumano Shrine.
- 1210 (Jōgen 4, 6th month): The emperor accepted Hideyasu, prince of Kazusa, as part of the court.
- 1210 (Jōgen 4, 8th month): The emperor visited the Kasuga Shrine.
- 1210 (Jōgen 4, 9th month): A comet with a very long tail appeared in the night sky.
- 1210 (Jōgen 4, 25th day of the 11th month): In the 12th year of Tsuchimikado-tennō's reign (土御門天皇12年), the emperor abdicated for no particular reason; and the succession (senso) was received by his younger brother, the second son of the former-Emperor Go-Toba. Shortly thereafter, Emperor Juntoku is said to have acceded to the throne (sokui).

== Notes ==
Preceded by Ken'ei	Era or nengō Jōgen; 1207–1211	Succeeded by Kenryaku
