= Kujō Ninshi =

Kujō Ninshi 九条任子

Empress consort of Japan
- Tenure: 31 May 1190 – 9 August 1200
- Born: 31 October 1173
- Died: 3 February 1239 (aged 65); Heian-kyō (Kyōto)
- Spouse: Emperor Go-Toba (m. 1190)
- Issue: Princess Shōshi
- House: Imperial House of Japan
- Father: Kujō Kanezane
- Mother: Fujiwara no Tomoko

Kujō Ninshi (九条 任子; 31 October 1173 – 3 February 1239), also known as Fujiwara no Ninshi (藤原 任子) and Gishūmon-in (宜秋門院), was an empress consort of Japan. She was the consort of Emperor Go-Toba.

In 1190, she was appointed as Go-Toba's empress. This was likely part of political manoeuvring by her father, Kujō Kanezane, who was appointed regent the next year.

In 1195, Ninshi gave birth to a daughter. Unusually and suddenly, a year later Ninshi left the palace. There has been speculation as to the reason behind this departure: a leading theory suggests that it was arranged by rival families as part of an attempt to overthrow her father, Kanezane.

Upon the death of her mother in 1201, she undertook the Buddhist precepts under the monk Hōnen.

Issue

- Imperial Princess Shōshi (昇子内親王) (1195–1211) - unmarried Empress as adopted mother of Emperor Juntoku (Shunkamon-in, 春華門院)

== Notes ==
Japanese royalty
| Preceded by Princess Sukeko | Empress consort of Japan; 1190–1200 | Succeeded by Princess Noriko |
