= Fujiwara no Ariko =

Sanjō Ariko 三条有子

Empress consort of Japan
- Tenure: March 28, 1223 – March 9, 1227
- Born: 1207
- Died: March 2, 1286 (aged 78–79); Heian-kyō (Kyōto)
- Spouse: Emperor Go-Horikawa (m. 1223; died 1234)
- House: Imperial House of Japan
- Father: Sanjō Kinfusa
- Mother: Fujiwara no Shushi

Fujiwara no Ariko (藤原（三条）有子; 1207 – March 2, 1286) also known as Fujiwara no Yushi, and Ankimon-in (安喜門院) was Empress of Japan as the consort of Emperor Go-Horikawa.

She became a Buddhist nun in 1246.

== Notes ==
Japanese royalty
Preceded by Princess Kuniko	Empress consort of Japan; 1223–1227	Succeeded by Konoe Nagako
