= Gennin =

Period of Japanese history (1224–1225 CE)

Gennin (元仁) was a Japanese era name (年号, nengō; lit. "year name") after Jōō and before Karoku. This period spanned the years from November 1224 to April 1225. The reigning emperor was Go-Horikawa-tennō (後堀河天皇).

== Change of era ==
- 1224 Gennin gannen (元仁元年): The era name was changed to mark an event or a number of events. The previous era ended and a new one commenced in Jōō 3.

== Events of the Gennin Era ==
- 1224 (Gennin 1): Kyogyoshinsho was believed to have been composed in 1224; and this is also considered the year in which Jōdo Shinshū was founded.

== Notes ==
Preceded by Jōō	Era or nengō Gennin; 1224–1225	Succeeded by Karoku
