= Kaō (era) =

Period of Japanese history (1169–1171 CE)

Kaō (嘉応) was a Japanese era name (年号, nengō; lit. "year name") after Nin'an and before Jōan. This period spanned the years from April 1169 through April 1171. The reigning emperor was Takakura-tennō (高倉天皇).

== Change of era ==
- January 30, 1169 Kaō gannen (嘉応元年): The new era name was created to mark an event or series of events. The previous era ended and a new one commenced in Nin'an 4, on the 8th day of the 4th month of 1169.

== Events of the Kaō era ==
- 1169 (Kaō 1, 3rd month): The former-Emperor Go-Shirakawa made a pilgrimage to Mont Koya.
- 1169 (Kaō 1, 6th month): Go-Shirakawa accepted tonsure as a Buddhist priest; and he took the title Hōō.
- 1169 (Kaō 1, 12th month): The chūnagon Fujiwara no Nurisika was banished to Bingo province as a consequence of complaints of Buddhist priests from Mt. Hiei; but shortly thereafter, he was recalled to Heian-kyō because of past services to Emperor Go-Shirakawa.

Preceded by Nin'an	Era or nengō Kaō; 1169–1171	Succeeded by Jōan
