= Shōji (era) =

Period of Japanese history (1199–1201 CE)

Shōji (正治) was a Japanese era name (年号, nengō, "year name") after Kenkyū and before Kennin. This period spanned the years from April 1199 through February 1201. The reigning emperor was Tsuchimikado-tennō (土御門天皇).

== Change of era ==
- 1199 Shōji gannen (正治元年): The new era name was created to mark an event or a number of events. The previous era ended and a new one commenced in Kenkyū 10, on the 27th day of the 4th month of 1199.

== Events of the Shōji era ==
- January 29, 1199 (Shōji 2, 12th day of the 2nd month): Oyama Tomomasa was appointed to the shugo post of Harima Province and as governor of Heian-kyō.
- 1200 (Shōji 2, 10th month): Hōjō Tokimasa was created daimyō of Ōmi Province.
- 1201 (Shōji 3, New Year's Day): Beginning of the Kennin Rebellion.

== Notes ==
Preceded by Kenkyū	Era or nengō Shōji; 1199–1201	Succeeded by Kennin
