= Genkyū =

Period of Japanese history (1204–1206 CE)

Genkyū (元久) was a Japanese era name (年号, nengō; "year name") after Kennin and before Ken'ei. This period spanned the years from February 1204 through April 1206. The reigning emperor was Tsuchimikado-tennō (土御門天皇).

== Change of era ==
- 1204 Genkyū gannen (元久元年): The new era name was created to mark an event or a number of events. The previous era ended and a new one commenced in Kennin 4, on the 20th day of the 2nd month of 1204.

== Events of the Genkyū era ==
- 1204 (Genkyū 1, 10th month): Minamoto no Sanetomo ordered Hōjō Masanori, Hōjō Tomomichi and Hatakeyama Shigeyasu to travel to Heian-kyō. These three were charged with escorting the daughter of dainagon Fujiwara-no Noboukiyo to Kamakura where she would marry Sanetomo.
- 1204 (Genkyū 1, 12th month): Two of Sanetomo's emissaries returned to Kanto with his bride-to-be; but Shigeyasu remained in Heian-kyo where he died.
- 1205 (Genkyū 2, 3rd month): Kyoto and the provinces of the Kinai were devastated by a terrible storm; and at the time, the disaster was deemed to have been caused by the Buddhist priest Eisai after he brought the Zen school of Buddhism to the capital. Eisai was chased out of Kyoto, but in time, he was permitted to return.

Preceded by Kennin	Era or nengō Genkyū; 1204–1206	Succeeded by Ken'ei
