= Emperor Go-Horikawa =

Emperor of Japan from 1221 to 1232

Emperor Go-Horikawa 後堀河天皇
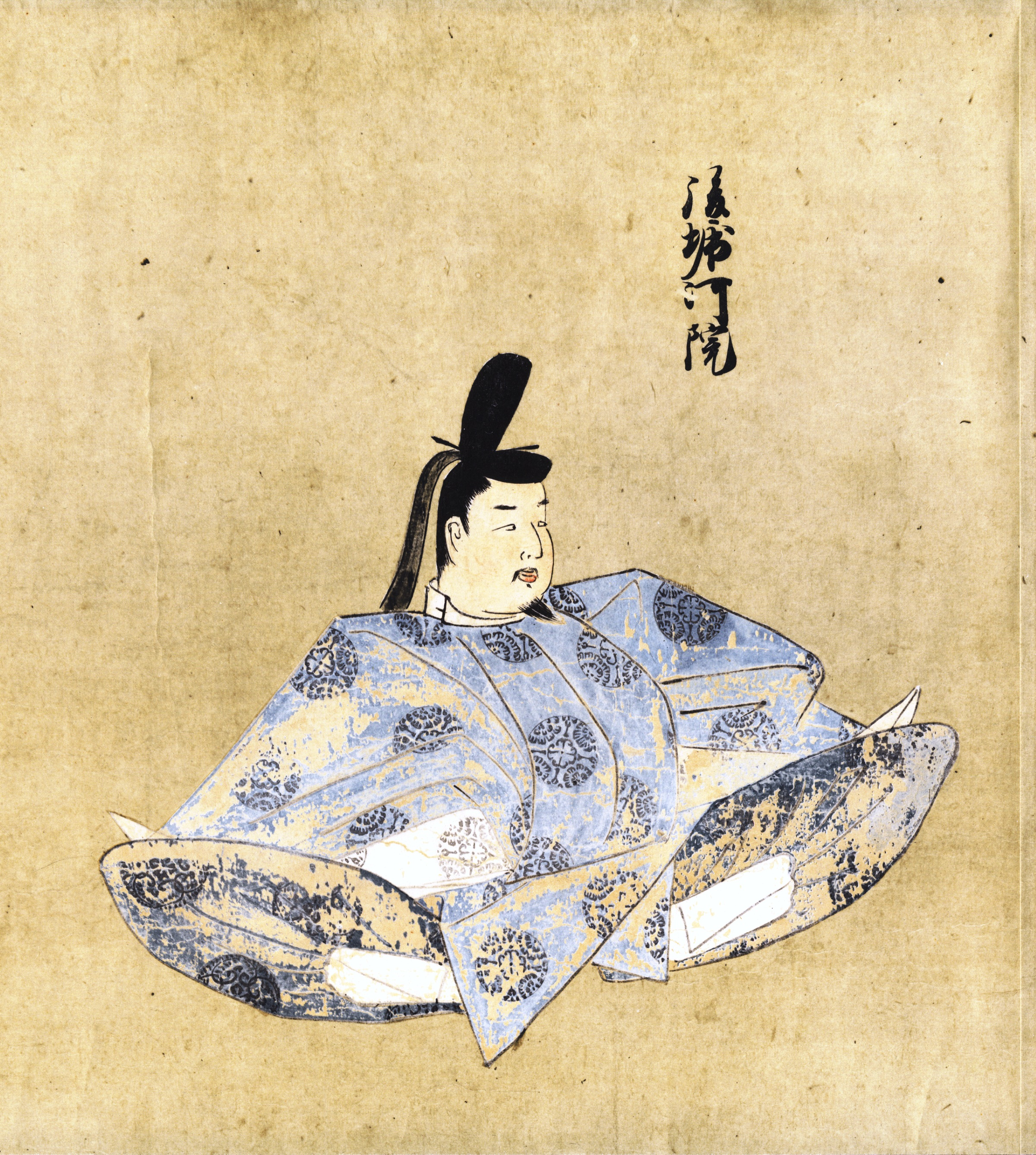
- Portrait from the Tenshi Sekkan Miei

Emperor of Japan
- Reign: 29 July 1221 – 17 November 1232
- Enthronement: 14 January 1222
- Predecessor: Chūkyō
- Successor: Shijō
- Shōgun: Kujō Yoritsune
- Born: 22 March 1212
- Died: 31 August 1234 (aged 22)
- Burial: Kannon-ji no Misasagi (觀音寺陵) (Kyoto)
- Spouse: Fujiwara no Ariko (m. 1223) Fujiwara no Chōshi (m. 1226) Fujiwara no Shunshi (m. 1230; died 1233)
- Issue more...: Emperor Shijō
Posthumous name
- Tsuigō: Emperor Go-Horikawa (後堀河院 or 後堀河天皇)
- House: Imperial House of Japan
- Father: Prince Morisada

Emperor Go-Horikawa (後堀河天皇, Go-Horikawa-tennō) (22 March 1212 – 31 August 1234), was the 86th emperor of Japan who reigned during the Jōō period, according to the traditional order of succession. His reign spanned the years from 1221 through 1232.

This 13th-century sovereign was named after the 11th-century Emperor Horikawa and go- (後), translates literally as "later"; and thus, he is sometimes called the "Later Emperor Horikawa". The Japanese word go has also been translated to mean the "second one;" and in some older sources, this emperor may be identified as "Horikawa, the second," or as "Horikawa II."

== Genealogy ==
Before his ascension to the Chrysanthemum Throne, his personal name (his imina) was Yutahito-shinnō (茂仁親王), also known as Motsihito-shinnō. The third son of Imperial Prince Morisada (守貞親王) (Go-Takakura-in, 後高倉院), the second son of Emperor Takakura.

- Empress (Jingū): Sanjō (Fujiwara) Ariuko (三条（藤原）有子) later Ankimon’in (安喜門院), Sanjo Kinfusa's daughter
- Empress (Chūgū): Konoe (Fujiwara) Nagako (近衛（藤原）長子) Later Takatsukasa’in (鷹司院), Konoe Iezane’s daughter.
- Empress (Chūgū): Kujō (Fujiwara) Shunshi (九条（藤原）竴子) Later Sōhekimon’in (藻璧門院), Kujo Michiie’s daughter
  - First son: Imperial Prince Mitsuhito (秀仁親王) later Emperor Shijō
  - Fourth daughter: Imperial Princess Hoshi (暤子内親王; 1232-1237)
  - Second Son: (1233)
- Lady-in-waiting: Betto-Naishi (別当典侍), Jimyōin Ieyuki’s daughter
  - First daughter: Imperial Princess Kishi (暉子内親王; 1228-1300) later Muromachi-in (室町院)
  - Second daughter: Imperial Princess Taishi (体子内親王; 1231-1302) later Shinsenmon’in (神仙門院)
- Lady-in-waiting: Dainagon-no-Tsubone (大納言局), Fujiwara Kaneyoshi’s daughter
  - Third daughter: Imperial Princess Akiko (昱子内親王; 1231-1246)

== Events of Go-Horikawa's life ==
In 1221, because of the Jōkyū Incident, an unsuccessful attempt by Emperor Go-Toba to seize real power, the Kamakura shogunate completely excluded those of the imperial family descended from Emperor Go-Toba from the Chrysanthemum Throne, thus forcing Emperor Chūkyō to abdicate. After the Genpei War, he, as the grandson of the late Emperor Takakura, who was also a nephew of the then-exiled Retired Emperor Go-Toba, and Chūkyō's first cousin, was enthroned as Go-Horikawa. He ruled from July 29, 1221 to October 26 (?), 1232.

- 29 July 1221 (Jōkyū 3, 9th day of the 7th month): In the 1st year of what is now considered to have been Chūkyō-tennō's reign (仲恭天皇一年), he abruptly abdicated without designating an heir; and contemporary scholars then construed that the succession (‘‘senso’’) was received by a grandson of former Emperor Takakura.
- 14 January 1222 (Jōkyū 3, 1st day of the 12th month): Emperor Go-Horikawa acceded to the throne (‘‘sokui’’).

As Go-Horikawa was only ten-years-old at this time, his father Imperial Prince Morisada acted as cloistered emperor under the name Go-Takakura-in.

In 1232, he began his own cloistered rule, abdicating to his 1-year-old son, Emperor Shijō. However, he had a weak constitution, and his cloistered rule lasted just under two years before he died.

Emperor Go-Horikawa's Imperial tomb (misasagi) is at Sennyū-ji in the Nochi no Tsukinowa no Higashiyama no misasagi (後月輪東山陵).

=== Kugyō ===
Kugyō (公卿) is a collective term for the very few most powerful men attached to the court of the Emperor of Japan in pre-Meiji eras.

In general, this elite group included only three to four men at a time. These were hereditary courtiers whose experience and background would have brought them to the pinnacle of a life's career. During Go-Horikawa's reign, this apex of the Daijō-kan included:

- Sesshō, Konoe Iezane, d. 1242.
- Sadaijin, Konoe Iemichi, 1204–1224.
- Udaijin, Fujiwara Kintsugu, 1117–1227.
- Naidaijin, Saionji Kintsune, 1171–1224.
- Dainagon

== Eras of Go-Horikawa's reign ==
The years of Go-Horikawa's reign are more specifically identified by more than one era name or nengō.

- Jōkyū (1219–1222 CE)
- Jōō (1222–1224 CE)
- Gennin (1224–1225 CE)
- Karoku (1225–1227 CE)
- Antei (1227–1229 CE)
- Kangi (1229–1232 CE)

== See also ==
- Emperor of Japan
- List of Emperors of Japan
- Imperial cult

== Notes ==
Japanese Imperial kamon — a stylized chrysanthemum blossom

Regnal titles
Preceded by Emperor Chūkyō	Emperor of Japan: Go-Horikawa; 1221–1232	Succeeded by Emperor Shijō
