= Jōan (era) =

Period of Japanese history (1171–1175 CE)

Jōan (承安) was a Japanese era name (年号, nengō; lit. "year name") after Kaō and before Angen. This period spanned the years from April 1171 through July 1175. The reigning emperor was Takakura-tennō (高倉天皇).

== Change of era ==
- 1171 Jōan gannen (承安元年): The new era name was created to mark an event or series of events. The previous era ended and a new one commenced in Kaō 3, on the 21st day of the 4th month of 1171.

== Events of the Jōan era ==
- 1172 (Jōan 1, 3rd day of the 1st month): The emperor had attained the age of 11 years; accordingly, the hair on his head was shaved as a sign of his coming of age.
- 1171 (Jōan 1, 13th day of the 1st month): The young emperor made a visit to the home of former-Emperor Go-Shirakawa, where he first met Tiara-no Tokoku, the adopted daughter of Go-Shirakawa and the actual daughter of Taira no Kiomori. He accepted the 15-year-old girl as one of his consorts, and she moved into his palace.
- 1171 (Jōan 2, 10th day of the 2nd month): Taira Kiyomori's daughter, Tokuko, becomes Emperor Takakura's his secondary empress (chūgo).
- 1172 (Jōan 2, 10th month): Takakura visited the Fushimi Inari-taisha and the Yasaka Shrine.
- 1172 (Jōan 2, 12th month): Matsu motofusa ceased to be regent (sesshō) and daijō-daijin; and he obtained the office of kampaku.
- 1173 (Jōan 3, 1st day of the 4th month): Shinran, founder of Jodo Shinshu, was born and named Matsuwakamaro
- 1173 (Jōan 3, 4th month): The emperor visited the Iwashimizu Shrine and the Kamo Shrines.
- 1173 (Jōan 3, 10th month): The emperor's mother, Ken-shun-mon In, founded the Saishōkō Cloister, which was consecrated at a dedication ceremony in which she was a participant.
- 1174 (Jōan 4, 1st month): The emperor made visits to his father and to his mother.

== Notes ==
Preceded by Kaō	Era or nengō Jōan; 1171–1175	Succeeded by Angen
