= Kennin =

Period of Japanese history (1201–1204 CE)

Kennin (建仁) was a Japanese era name (年号, nengō; lit. "year name") after Shōji and before Genkyū. This period spanned the years from February 1201 through February 1204. The reigning emperor was Tsuchimikado-tennō (土御門天皇).

== Change of era ==
- 1201 Kennin gannen (建仁元年); 1201: The new era name was created to mark an event of shin'yū (辛酉), which is considered as the year of revolution in Sexagenary cycle. The previous era ended and a new one commenced in Shōji 3, on the 13th day of the 2nd month of 1201.

== Events of the Kennin era ==
- 1201 (Kennin 1, May): The Kennin Rebellion is defeated.
- 1202 (Kennin 2, 1st month): Nitta Yoshishige, the deputy director for cuisine of Dairi (大炊助) in Daijō-kan, died. His court rank had been of the second rank of the fifth class (従五位下).
- 1202 (Kennin 2, 7th month): Minamoto no Yoriie was raised in the court's hierarchic standing to the second rank of the second class; and he was created the 2nd shōgun of the Kamakura shogunate.
- 1202 (Kennin 2, 10th month): Naidaijin Minamoto no Michichika died at 54; and his court position was then filled by dainagon Fujiwara no Takatada.
- 1202 (Kennin 2): On orders from Shōgun Minamoto no Yoriie, the monk Eisai founded Kennin-ji, a Zen temple and monastery in the Rinzai sect.
- 1203 (Kennin 3, 8th month): Shōgun Yoriie fell gravely ill.
- 1203 (Kennin 3, 9th month): Yoriie shaved his head and became a Buddhist priest; and the emperor named Minamoto no Sanetomo as the 3rd shōgun; and Hōjō Tokimasa became Sanetomo's shikken (regent).

== Notes ==
| Preceded by Shōji | Era or nengō Kennin; 1201–1204 | Succeeded by Genkyū |
