= Jōō (Kamakura period) =

Period of Japanese history (1222–1224 CE)

Jōō (貞応), also romanized as Jō-ō, was a Japanese era name (年号, nengō; lit. "year name") before Gennin and after Jōkyū. This period spanned the years from April 1222 to November 1224. The reigning emperor was Go-Horikawa-tennō.

== Change of era ==
- 1222 Jōō gannen (貞応元年): The era name was changed to Jōō (meaning "Righteous Answer") to mark an event or a number of events. The previous era ended and a new one commenced in Jōkyū, on the 13th day of the 4th month of 1222.

== Events of the Jōō era ==
- 1222 (Jōō 2): Regulations established concerning salaries for Jitō
- July 19, 1223 (Jōō 2, 20th day of the 6th month): The buildings of the Asama Shrine at the base of Mount Fuji in Suruga province were re-built by Hōjō Tokimasa.

== Notes ==
Preceded by Jōkyū	Era or nengō Jōō; 1222–1224	Succeeded by Gennin
