= Antei =

Period of Japanese history (1227–1229 CE)

Antei (安貞) was a Japanese era name (年号, nengō; lit. "year name") after Gennin and before Kangi. This period spanned the years from December 1227 to March 1229. The reigning emperor was Go-Horikawa-tennō (後堀河天皇).

== Change of era ==
- 1227 Antei gannen (安貞元年): The era name was changed to mark an event or a number of events. The previous era ended and a new one commenced in Karoku 3.

== Events of the Antei Era ==
- 1227 (Antei 1, 1st month): Fujiwara Kintsugu died at age 53. He had been Udaijin and Sadaijin.
- 1227 (Antei 1, 2nd month): The emperor raised Fujiwara no Nagako, the daughter of Konoe Iezane, to the rank of chūgū (empress consort). She was somewhat older than the emperor, but he became deeply attached to her.

== Notes ==
Preceded by Gennin	Era or nengō Antei; 1227–1229	Succeeded by Kangi
