= Jōkyū =

Period of Japanese history (1219–1222 CE)

Jōkyū (承久), also called Shōkyū, was a Japanese era name (年号, nengō; lit. "year name") after Kempō and before Jōō. This period spanned the years from April 1219 through April 1222. The reigning emperor was Juntoku-tennō (順徳天皇).

== Change of era ==
- 1219 Jōkyū gannen (承久元年): The new era name was created because the previous era ended and a new one commenced in Kempo 3, on the 6th day of the 12th month of 1219.

== Events of the Jōkyū era ==
- February 12, 1219 (Jōkyū 1, 26th day of the 1st month): Shōgun Sanetomo was assassinated on the steps of Tsurugaoka Hachiman-gū in Kamakura. The 40 years during which Minamoto no Yoritomo, Minamoto no Yoriie and Minamoto no Sanetomo were successive heads of the Kamakura shogunate was sometimes called "the period of the three shōguns." A new shōgun was not to be named for several years during which the Kamakura bureaucracy nevertheless continued to function without interruption.
- 1220 (Jōkyū 2, 2nd month): The emperor visited the Iwashimizu Shrine and the Kamo Shrines.
- May 13, 1221 (Jōkyū 3, 20th day of the 4th month): In the 11th year of Juntoku-tennō's reign (順徳天皇11年), the emperor abdicated; and the succession (senso) was received by eldest son who was only 4 years old. Shortly thereafter, Emperor Chūkyō is said to have acceded to the throne (sokui). The reign of Emperor Chūkyō spans a small number of months.
- July 29, 1221 (Jōkyū 3, 9th day of the 7th month): In the 1st year of what is now considered to have been Chūkyō-tennō's reign (仲恭天皇1年), he abruptly abdicated without designating an heir; and contemporary scholars then construed that the succession (senso) was received by a grandson of former Emperor Go-Toba.
- 1221 (Jōkyū 3): The Jōkyū War (Jōkyū no ran) was an armed attempt by Emperor Go-Toba and his supporters, trying unsuccessfully to take power from the Kamakura bakufu.
- January 14, 1222 (Jōkyū 3, 1st day of the 12th month): Emperor Go-Horikawa acceded to the throne (sokui).

== Notes ==
| Preceded by Kempo | Era or nengō Jōkyū; 1219–1222 | Succeeded by Jōō |
