= Kujō Yoshitsune =

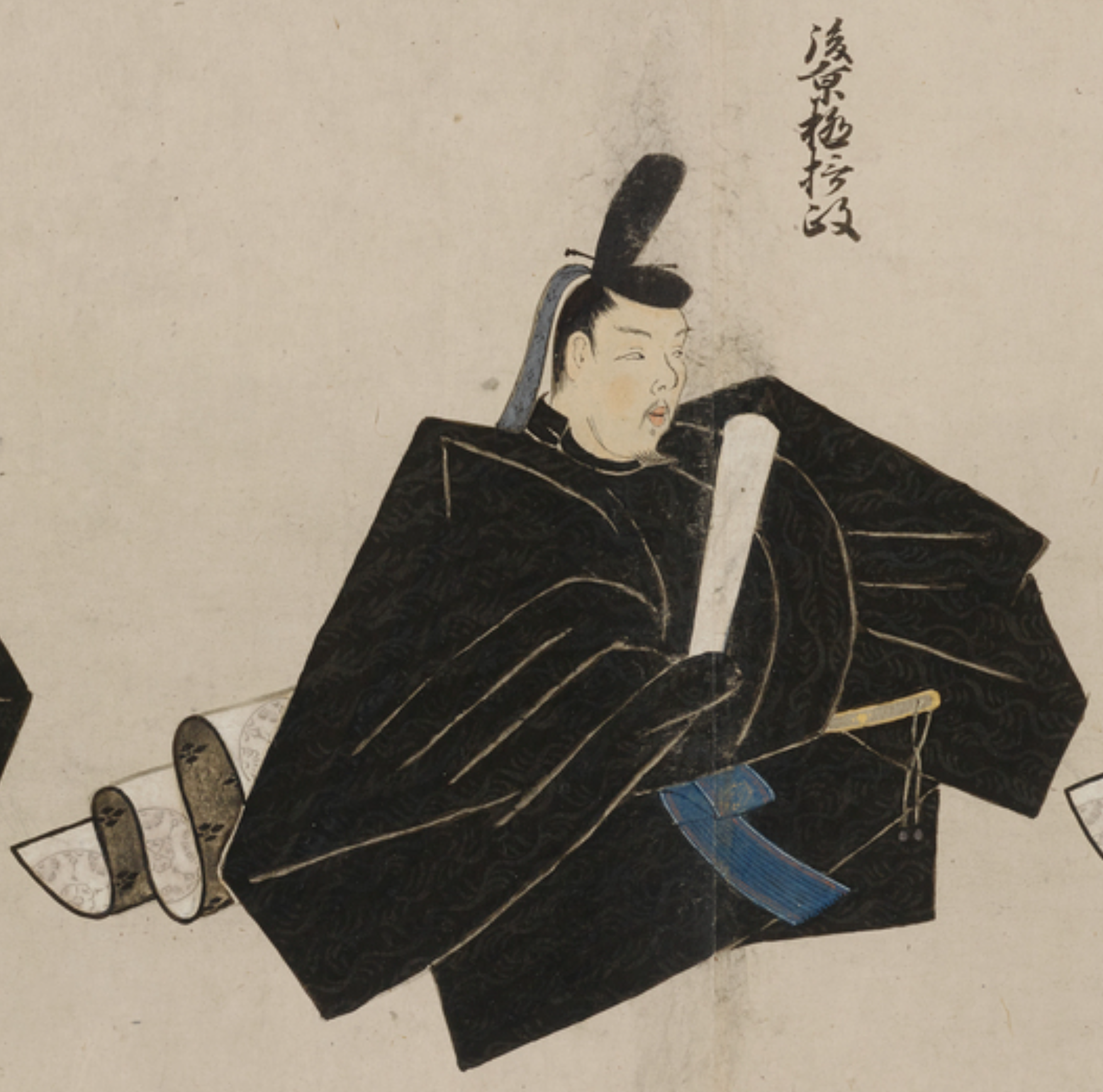
Kujō Yoshitsune

Kujō Yoshitsune (九条 良経; 1169 – 16 April 1206), also known as Fujiwara no Yoshitsune, son of regent Kujō Kanezane and a daughter of Fujiwara no Sueyuki, was a kugyō or Japanese court noble from the late Heian period to the early Kamakura period. He held a regent position Sesshō from 1202 to 1206. Kujō Michiie was his son.

In 1179 Yoshitsune came of age. In 1188 when his elder brother died he was designated as successor of the family. In 1196 political shake-up caused him to lose the court position he was appointed a year before.

== Family ==
- Father: Kujō Kanezane
- Mother: Fujiwara Tomoko
- Wives and Children:
  - Wife: Ichijō Yoshiyasu's daughter
    - Kujō Michiie
    - Kujō Noriie (1194–1225)
    - Fujiwara no Ritsushi married Emperor Juntoku
  - Wife: Fujiwara Hisako (?-1222)
    - Kujō Motoie
  - Wife: Samesuke Masatsune's daughter
    - Ryoson
  - Wife: Daizendaibu Nobunori's daughter
    - Dokei
  - unknown
    - Keisei (1189–1268)
