= Emperor Takakura =

Emperor of Japan from 1168 to 1180

Emperor Takakura 高倉天皇
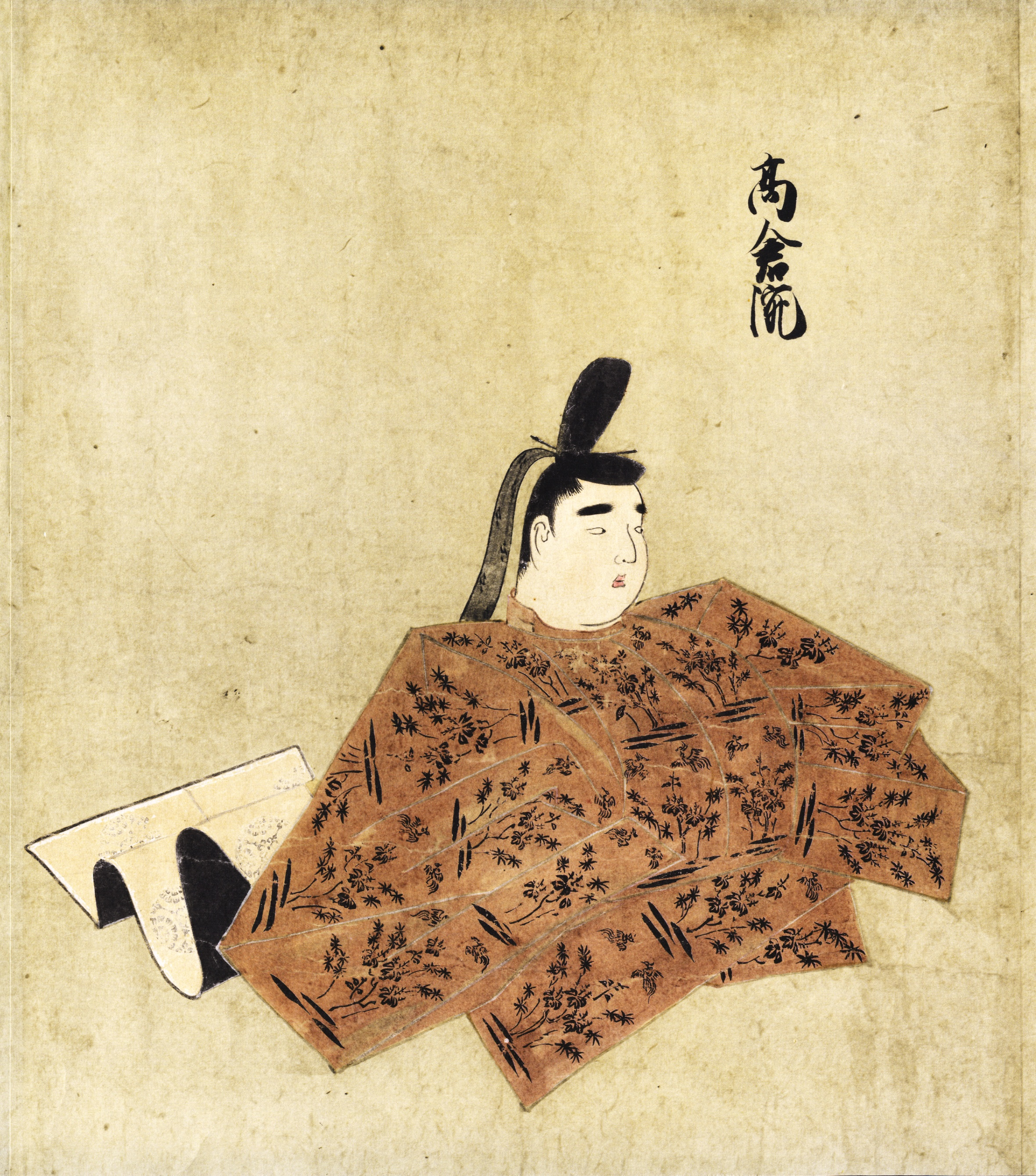
- Portrait from Tenshi Sekkan Miei

Emperor of Japan
- Reign: 30 March 1168 – 18 March 1180
- Enthronement: 29 April 1168
- Predecessor: Rokujō
- Successor: Antoku
- Born: 20 September 1161
- Died: 30 January 1181 (aged 19); Rokuhara mansion (六波羅池殿)
- Burial: Nochi no Seikan-ji no Misasagi (後清閑寺陵) (Kyoto)
- Spouse: Taira no Tokuko (m. 1172)
- Issue: Emperor Antoku; Prince Morisada; Prince Toyohito; Emperor Go-Toba; Princess Kiyoko; Prince Koreaki; Princess Isako; Princess Noriko
Posthumous name
- Tsuigō: Emperor Takakura (高倉院 or 高倉天皇)
- House: Imperial House of Japan
- Father: Emperor Go-Shirakawa
- Mother: Taira no Shigeko

Emperor Takakura (高倉天皇, Takakura-tennō; 20 September 1161 – 30 January 1181) was the 80th emperor of Japan, according to the traditional order of succession. His reign spanned the years from 1168 through 1180.

== Genealogy ==
Before his ascension to the Chrysanthemum Throne, his personal name (his imina) was Norihito-shinnō (憲仁親王).

Takakura was the fourth son of Emperor Go-Shirakawa, and thus uncle to his predecessor, Emperor Rokujō. His mother was Empress Dowager Taira no Shigeko, the younger sister of Taira no Tokiko, the concubine of Taira no Kiyomori. His empress consort was Taira no Tokuko (later Empress Dowager Kenrei), the regent of Taira no Kiyomori, and thus his first cousin (as his mother and Tokuko's mothers were sisters).

- Empress consort: Taira no Tokuko (平徳子) – later Kenreimon-in
  - First Son: Imperial Prince Tokihito (言仁親王) – later Emperor Antoku
- Lady-in-waiting: Bōmon Shokushi (坊門殖子; 1157–1228) later Shichijō-in (七条院), Bomon Nobutaka's daughter
  - Second son: Imperial Prince Morisada (守貞親王; 1179–1223) – later Go-Takakura In (後高倉院) – father of Emperor Go-Horikawa
  - Fourth son: Imperial Prince Takahira (尊成親王) – later Emperor Go-Toba
- Consort: Konoe Michiko (近衛通子; b. 1163) or Rokujō-no-tsubone (六条局), Konoe Motozane’s daughter.
- Lady-in-waiting: Horikawa Toyoko (堀河豊子) or Azechi-Naishi (按察典侍), Horikawa Yorisada’s daughter
  - Third daughter: Imperial Princess Kiyoko (潔子内親王; b. 1179) – Saigū of Ise
- Court Lady: Taira no Noriko (平範子) or Shōshō-Naishi (少将内侍), Taira Yoshisuke’s daughter
  - Third son: Imperial Prince Koreaki (惟明親王; 1172–1221) later Imperial Prince Priest Shōen (聖円入道親王)
- Court Lady: Fujiwara Kimiko (藤原公子) or Sochi-no-Tsubone (帥局), Fujiwara no Kimishige’s daughter – former nanny of Takakura
  - First daughter: Imperial Princess Isako (功子内親王; b. 1176) – Saigū of Ise
- Court Lady: Kogō-no-Tsubone (小督局; b. 1157), Fujiwara no Shigenori’s daughter
  - Second daughter: Imperial Princess Hanshi/ Noriko (範子内親王; 1177–1210) later Empress Dowager Bōmon-in (坊門院)

== Events of Takakura's life ==
Although Takakura was formally enthroned, the reality was that government affairs were controlled by his father and his father-in-law.

- 30 March 1168 (Nin'an 3, 19th day of the 2nd month): In the 3rd year of Rokujō-tennō's reign (六条天皇3年), the emperor was deposed by his grandfather, and the succession (‘‘senso’’) was received by his cousin, the third son of the retired-Emperor Go-Shirakawa.
- 29 April 1168 (Nin'an 3, 20th day of the 3rd month): Emperor Takakura is said to have acceded to the throne (‘‘sokui’’), and he is proclaimed emperor.

Takakura had his own views on the role of Emperor. He is said to have written:

"The Emperor is a ship. His subjects are water. The water enables a ship to float well, but sometimes the vessel is capsized by it. His subjects can sustain an Emperor well, but sometimes they overthrow him."

Ex-Emperor Go-Shirakawa exercised the powers attendant the well-settled patterns of cloistered rule. Taira no Kiyomori, who was the father of the Empress, did whatever he pleased as de facto Regent.

- 6 March 1172 (Jōan 2, 10th day of the 2nd month): Taira Kiyomori's daughter, Tokuko, becomes Takakura's consort.
- 27 May 1177 (Jishō 1, 28th day of the 4th month): A great fire in the capital was spread by high winds; and the palace was reduced to cinders.

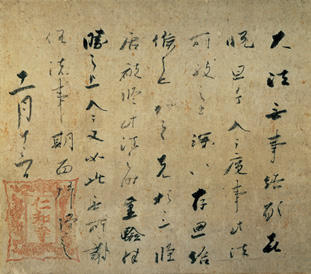
Only extant letter by Emperor Takakura

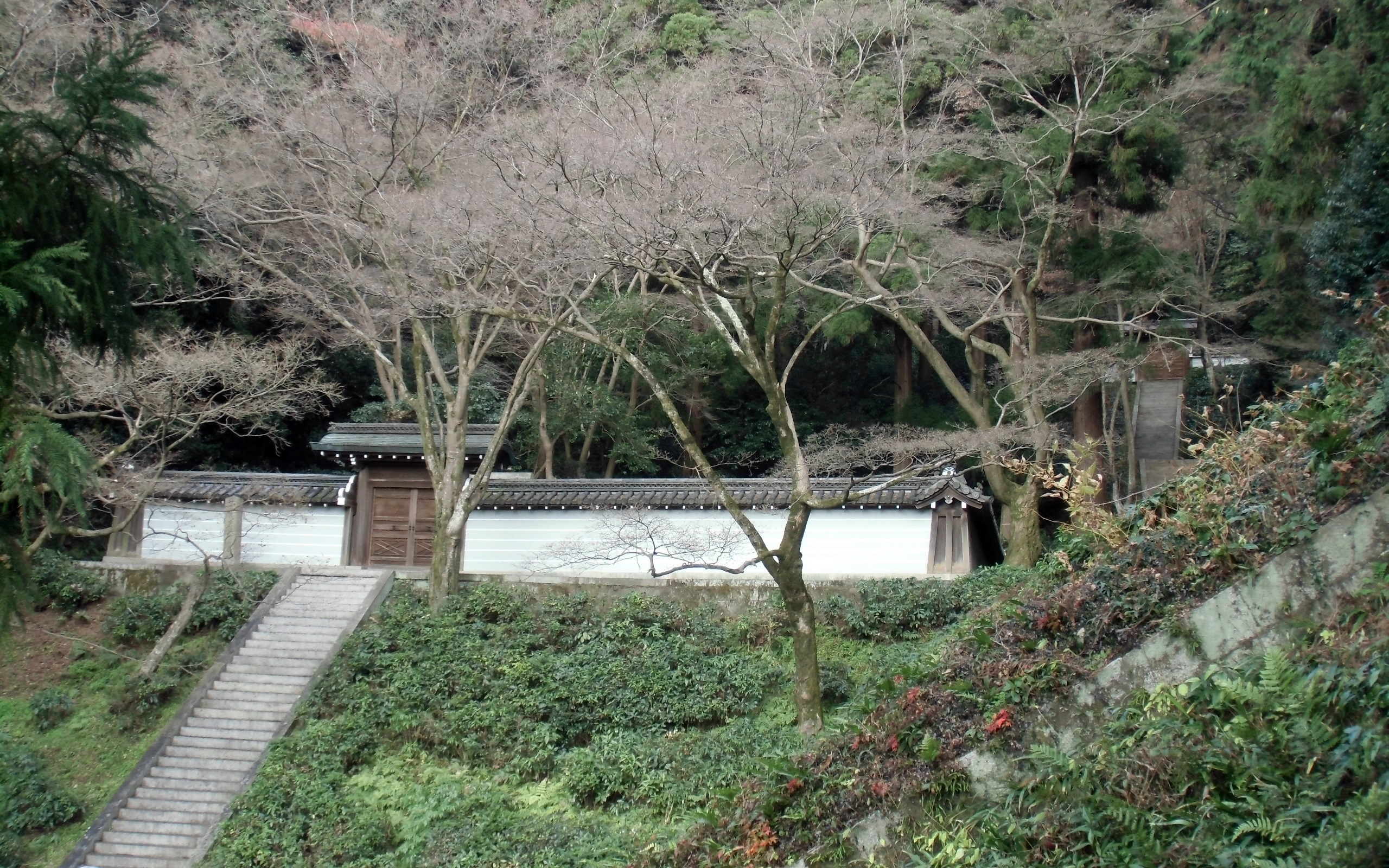
Tombs of Emperor Takakura and Emperor Rokujo.

- 22 December 1178 (Jishō 2, 12th day of the 11th month): Takakura's consort, Taira-no Tokuko, gave birth to a son. Kiyomori rejoiced; and all the officers of the court congratulated the parents. In the next month, this infant was declared heir to Emperor Takakura.
- 18 March 1180 (Jisho 4, 21st day of the 2nd month): Emperor Takakura abdicated.
- 18 May 1180 (Jisho 4, 22nd day of the 4th month): Emperor Antoku's coronation ceremony.
- 26 June 1180 (Jisho 4, 2nd day of the 6th month): Former-emperor Go-Shirakawa-in, former-emperor Takakura-in and Emperor Antoku leave Kyoto for Fukuhara-kyō.
- 14 December 1180 (Jisho 4, 26th day of the 11th month): The capital is moved back to Kyoto from Fukuhara.
- 1180 (Jisho 4): A devastating whirlwind causes havoc in Heian-kyō, the capital.
- 30 January 1181 (Jisho 5, 14th day of the 1st month): Emperor Takakura died.

Soon after the birth of Emperor Takakura's son, Prince Tokihito, he was pressured to abdicate. The one-year-old infant would become Emperor Antoku.

=== Kugyō ===
Kugyō (公卿) is a collective term for the most powerful men attached to the court of the Emperor of Japan in pre-Meiji eras.

In general, this elite group included only three to four men at a time. These were hereditary courtiers whose experience and background would have brought them to the pinnacle of a life's career. During Takakura's reign, this apex of the Daijō-kan included:

- Sesshō, Matsuo Motofusa, 1144–1230.
- Kampaku, Konoe Motomichi, 1160–1233.
- Daijō-daijin, Fujiwara Tadamasa.
- Daijō-daijin, Fujiwara Moronaga, 1137–1192.
- Sadaijin, Ōimikado Tsunemune, 1119–1189.
- Udaijin, Kujō Kanezane, 1149–1207.
- Nadaijin, Konoe Motomichi.
- Nadaijin, Minamoto Masamichi, died 1175.
- Nadaijin, Taira Shigemori, 1138–1179.
- Dainagon

== Eras of Takakura's reign ==
The years of Takakura's reign are more specifically identified by more than one era name or nengō.

- Nin'an (1166–1169)
- Kaō (1169–1171)
- Jōan (1171–1175)
- Angen (1175–1177)
- Jishō (1177–1181)

== Cultural references ==
Takakura is the "Imperial Sovereign" of the Japan-inspired land of Akatsurai in Book 6: "The Lords of the Rising Sun" in the Fabled Lands adventure gamebook series. He is portrayed as a young man with little real power, it being largely in the hands of his chancellor, "Lord Kiyomori".

== Ancestry ==
Ancestors of Emperor Takakura

8. Emperor Horikawa (1079-1107)
4. Emperor Toba (1103-1156)
9. Fujiwara no Ishi (1076-1103)
2. Emperor Go-Shirakawa (1127-1192)
10. Fujiwara no Kinzane (1053-1107)
5. Fujiwara no Tamako (1101-1145)
11. Fujiwara no Mitsuko (1060-1121)
1. Emperor Takakura
12. Taira no Tomonobu (d. 1144)
6. Taira no Tokinobu (d. 1149)
3. Taira no Shigeko (1142-1176)
14. Fujiwara no Akiyori (1094-1148)
7. Fujiwara no Yūko
15. Fujiwara no Tadako

== See also ==
- Emperor of Japan
- List of Emperors of Japan
- Imperial cult

== Notes ==
Japanese Imperial kamon — a stylized chrysanthemum blossom

Regnal titles
Preceded by Emperor Rokujō	Emperor of Japan: Takakura; 1168–1180	Succeeded by Emperor Antoku
