= Jitō period =

Chronological timeframe during the Asuka period of Japanese history

The Jitō period is a chronological timeframe during the Asuka period of Japanese history. The Jitō period describes a span of years which were considered to have begun in the 1347th year of the imperial dynasty.

This periodization is congruent with the reign of Empress Jitō, which is traditionally considered to have been from 686 through 697.

== Periodization ==
The adoption of the Sexagenary cycle calendar (Jikkan Jūnishi) in Japan is attributed to Empress Suiko in 604; and this Chinese calendar continued in use throughout the Jitō period.

In 645, the system of Japanese era names (年号, nengō; "year name") was introduced. However, after the reign of Emperor Kōtoku, this method of segmenting time was temporarily abandoned or allowed to lapse. This interval continued during the Jitō period.

Neither Empress Jitō's reign nor the Jitō periodization are included in the list of nengō for this explicit duration of time, which comes after Suchō and before Taihō.

In the post-Taika or pre-Taihō chronology, the first year of Empress Jitō's reign (持統天皇元年 or 斉持統皇1年) is also construed as the first year of the Jitō period (持統1年).

== Non-nengō period ==
Non-nengō periods in the pre-Taihō calendar were published in 1880 by William Bramsen. These were refined in 1952 by Paul Tsuchihashi in Japanese Chronological Tables from 601 to 1872.

The pre-Tahiō calendar included two non-nengō gaps or intervals in the chronological series:

- Taika, August 645–February 650.
- Hakuchi, February 650–December 654.
  - Non-nengō dating systems
- Shuchō, July–September 686.
  - Non-nengō dating systems
- Taihō, March 701–May 704.

Nengō were not promulgated (or were allowed to lapse) during the gap years between Hakuchi and Shuchō, and in another gap between Shuchō and Taihō.

Concurrent Chronologies
Non-nengō periods	Nengō eras	Shinengō	Yamato dynasty duration	Western calendar dates
	Taika		1305	645
	Hakuchi		1310	650
Saimei's reign			1315	655
Tenji's reign			1322	662
Kōbun's reign		Sujaku	1332	672
Temmu's reign		Hakuhō	1333	673
	Suchō		1346	686
Jitō's reign			1347	687
		Taika	1350	695
Mommu's reign			1357	697
	Taihō		1361	701

== Events of the Jitō period ==
- 686 (Jitō 1): Emperor Temmu dies, but his son and heir was deemed too young to receive the succession (senso). Instead, the mother of the heir succeeds the Chrysanthemum Throne (senso) as Empress Jitō until her son would grow mature enough to accept senso and sokui.
- 686 : - In the annals are frequently mentioned the generous donations in the form of land, given by the Empress to Buddhist temples. For example, in 686, the Daiganji temple 大巌寺 was promoted by 700 yards, the temples of Hinokuma-dera 桧隈寺, Karu-dera 輕寺, Okubo-dera 大窪寺 were promoted by 100 yards, and a temple Kose-dera 巨勢寺 had received 200 yards (IBID, pp. 215-216).
- 686 : - Being a remarkable politician, Empress Jitō decided to use the Buddha’s Dharma in order to assimilate emishi 蝦夷—the northern tribes of the Japanese archipelago, standing at a lower level of social development. As informs “Nihon Shōki”, these tribes were conquered during the reign of the legendary Emperor Jimmu. In fact, the Japanese emperors had to carry out a series of military campaigns during the several centuries before emishi became their subjects. Empress Jitō, unlike her predecessors, who considered emishi as barbarians, allowed them to practice Buddhism and taking Buddhist percepts. Because the Buddhist monks were exempted from the taxes and labor obligations, this fact equated emishi with the rights of the other Japanese people
- 686 (Jitō1): A new period is marked by the beginning of the reign of Empress Jitō, but the end of the previous nengō Hakuchi 6 (654) does not imply the commencement of a new nengō in the succeeding reigns.
- 688 : Mushadaie Festival" was held at Yakushi-ji Temple
- 688 : Fujiwara no Fuhito is appointed as jikikoshi (the sixteenth grade of jikiko rank for vassals of the forty-eight grades of cap rank, which corresponded to Jugoinoge [Junior Fifth Rank, Lower Grade of Taiho Code]) judge (aged 31).
- 688 (Jitō 3): Prince Kusakabe, Empress Jitō's son, dies at age of 27.
- 689 (Jitō 4): Empress Jitō formally accedes to the Chrysanthemum Throne (sokui) on the first month, first day.
- 689 : - The Asuka Kiyomihara Code (飛鳥浄御原令, Asuka Kiyomihara-ryō) refers to a collection of governing rules compiled and promulgated in 689, one of the first, if not the first collection of Ritsuryō laws in classical Japan.
- 689 : the two representatives of the emishi—brothers Maro 麻呂 and Kanaori 鐵折 asked the official permission to take percepts and became the Buddhist monks (lit. “asked to shave their hair and become shramana”—koiteki binpatsu nashite shamon 請剔鬢髪爲沙門). The Empress allowed them to take tonsure, because, as she declared: “While Maro and [his brother] are still young, they have gentle [heart] and no [worldly] desires (kanga kayoku 閑雅寡欲). They desire to eat vegetables and hold [Buddhist] percepts (kusabira tabete, jigai 蔬食持戒). So, let them, according to their desire, become monks and training in [Dharma] (shukke shūdō 出家修道)” (IBID).
- 689 : Prince Shiki was appointed as Yoki koto Erabu Tsukasa (literally, an official post to select and compile admonitions). Prince Shiki, SAMI no Sukunamaro, HATA no Sai, IYOBE no Umakai, TSUKI no Okina, OTOMO no Tauchi, and KOSE no Tayasu were appointed to Yogoto Tsukuri no Tsukasa. His rank was Jikikoushi then.
- 690 : - On the basis of this Code of Households, the national family register 'Koin no Nenjaku' was established in 690.
- 690 : Empress travelled to Ise against the counsel of minister Miwa-no-Asono-Takechimaro
- 690 : The construction of Fujiwara-kyo started
- 690 : Genka reki (Genka calendar) was adopted in combination with Giho reki in 690, according to "Nihonshoki" (Chronicles of Japan)
- 691 : - According to the "Nihon Shoki" (The Chronicles of Japan), its history goes back to a time when Emperor Jito invited and appointed Shugen ZOKU and Kokaku SATSU to become Professors of Ondo
- 691 : Empress went to Fujiwara and inspected the site for Fujiwara Palace; she was accompanied by the ministers and public functionaries.
- 692 : - Organizing people according to area was nearly complete, and in the year 692, kubunden (farm land given to each farmer in the Ritsuryo system) began to be distributed in the Kinai region on the basis of Koin no Nenjaku. It is presumed that the Handen Shuju ho (the law of periodic reallocations of rice land) was put in force all over Japan at the same time.
- 692 : in the province of Oposumi and Ato (modern prefecture Kagoshima on Kyushu Island), the lands inhabited by the tribes of hayato, were sent the Buddhist missionaries (IBID, p. 225). These records from “Nihon Shōki” could be the evidence, that from the reign of Jitō, the authorities began to use Buddhism for the integration of local tribes into the state ideological system.
- 693 : - Okisome no Oku was accused of theft in 693, however, he was pardoned out of consideration for his service in the Jinshin War.
- 694 : - Empress Jito transferred the capital to Fujiwarakyo, Japan's first full-scale castle town.
- 694 : - Iki no Hakatoko was appointed to Kenshiragishi (Japanese envoy to Silla).
- 694 : Empress Jito encouraged 108 people to enter the Buddhist priesthood, praying for the Imperial Princess Asuka's recovery from her illness.
- 695 : Ono no Kenu was appointed a Japanese envoy to Shilla and sailed for Shilla. In November 700, he became Tsukushi-no-daini (Senior Assistant Governor-General of the Tsukushi offices).
- 697 (Jitō 11): Prince Karu, the Empress' grandson, is made the Heir Apparent on the second month, 16th day. The Empress gets sick. She abdicates the Chrysanthemum Throne in favor of Prince Karu on the eighth month, first day.

Empress Jitō distributed rice to the aged throughout the years of her reign.

Jitō period	1st	2nd	3rd	4th	5th	6th	7th	8th	9th	10th	11th	12th	13th
Gregorian	686	687	688	687	689	690	691	692	693	694	695	696	697

Preceded by ——	Era or nengō: Shuchō; 686	Succeeded by ——
Preceded by Tenmu period	Jitō period Reign of Empress Jitō	Succeeded by Monmu period

== See also ==
- Regnal name
- List of Japanese era names
