= Kōbun (period) =

Chronological timeframe during the Asuka period of Japan

The Kōbun period is a chronological timeframe during the Asuka period of Japanese history. The Kōbun period describes a span of years which were considered to have begun in the 1332nd year of the imperial dynasty.

This periodization is consistent with the short reign of Emperor Kōbun, which is traditionally considered to have been from 672 through 673.

== Periodization ==
The adoption of the Sexagenary cycle calendar (Jikkan Jūnishi) in Japan is attributed to Empress Suiko in 604; and this Chinese calendar continued in use throughout the Kōbun period.

In 645, the system of Japanese era names (年号,, nengō,, lit. "year name") was introduced. However, after the reign of Emperor Kotoku, this method of segmenting time was temporarily abandoned or allowed to lapse. This interval continued during the Kōbun period.

Neither Emperor Kōbun's reign nor the Kōbun periodization are included in the list of nengō for this explicit duration of time. The Sujaku period (朱雀, Sujaku) was an unofficial nengō during the reign of Emperor Kōbun after Hakuchi and before Suchō. The duration of this discrete non-nengō timespan lasted for about two years.

In the post-Taika or pre-Taihō chronology, the first year of Emperor Kōbun's reign (弘文天皇元年 or 弘文天皇1年) is also construed as the first year of the Kōbun period (弘文1年).

== Non-nengō period ==
Non-nengō periods in the pre-Taihō calendar were published in 1880 by William Bramsen. These were refined in 1952 by Paul Tsuchihashi in Japanese Chronological Tables from 601 to 1872.

The pre-Tahiō calendar included two non-nengō gaps or intervals in the chronological series:

- Taika, August 645–February 650.
- Hakuchi, February 650–December 654.
  - Non-nengō dating systems
- Shuchō, July–September 686.
  - Non-nengō dating systems
- Taihō, March 701–May 704.

Nengō were not promulgated (or were allowed to lapse) during the gap years between Hakuchi and Shuchō, and in another gap between Shuchō and Taihō.

Concurrent Chronologies
Non-nengō periods	Nengō eras	Shinengō	Imperial dynasty duration	Western calendar dates
	Taika		1305	645
	Hakuchi		1310	650
Saimei's reign			1315	655
Tenji's reign			1322	662
Kōbun's reign		Sujaku	1332	672
Tenmu's reign		Hakuhō	1333	673
	Suchō		1346	686
Jitō's reign			1347	687
		Taika	1350	695
Monmu's reign			1357	697
	Taihō		1361	701

== Events of the Kōbun period ==
- 672 (Kōbun 1): Emperor Tenji dies; and his son, Prince Ō-ama (later to become Emperor Tenmu), declines to receive the succession (senso). Shortly thereafter, his older brother, Ō-tomo (posthumously known as Emperor Kōbun after 1870), formally accedes to the throne (sokui).
- 672 (Kōbun 1): A new period is marked by the beginning of the reign of Emperor Kōbun; but this posthoumus name was created retroactively in 1870, and Meiji scholars did not determine retroactively that a new nengō should have commenced with the beginning of Kōbun's accession.

== See also ==
- Regnal name
- Jinshin War
- List of Japanese era names

== Notes ==
Preceded by —	nengō in abeyance	Succeeded by —
Preceded by Tenji period	Kōbun period Reign of Emperor Kōbun (672–673)	Succeeded by Tenmu period
