= Saimei period =

Chronological timeframe during the Asuga period of Japanese history

The Saimei period is a chronological timeframe during the Asuka period of Japanese history. The Saimei period describes a span of years which were considered to have begun in the 1315th year of the imperial dynasty.

This periodization is congruent with the reign of Empress Saimei, which is traditionally considered to have been from 655 through 662.

== Periodization ==
The adoption of the Sexagenary cycle calendar (Jikkan Jūnishi) in Japan is attributed to Empress Suiko in 604; and this Chinese calendar continued in use throughout the Saimei period.

In 645, the system of Japanese era names (年号,, nengō,; lit. "year name") was introduced. However, after the reign of Emperor Kotoku, this method of segmenting was temporarily abandoned or allowed to lapse. This interval continued during the Saimei period.

Neither Empress Saimei's reign nor the Saimei periodization are included in the list of nengō for this explicit duration of time, which comes after Hakuchi and before Suchō.

In the post-Taika or pre-Taihō chronology, the first year of Empress Saimei's reign (斉明天皇元年 or 斉明天皇1年) is also construed as the first year of the Saimei period (斉明1年).

== Non-nengō period ==
Non-nengō periods in the pre-Taihō calendar were published in 1880 by William Bramsen. These were refined in 1952 by Paul Tuschihashi in Japanese Chronological Tables from 601 to 1872.

The pre-Tahiō calendar included two non-nengō gaps or intervals in the chronological series:

- Taika, August 645–February 650.
- Hakuchi, February 650–December 654.
  - Non-nengō dating systems
- Shuchō, July–September 686.
  - Non-nengō dating systems
- Taihō, March 701–May 704.

Nengō were not promulgated (or were allowed to lapse) during the gap years between Hakuchi and Shuchō, and in another gap between Shuchō and Taihō.

Concurrent Chronologies
Non-nengō periods	Nengō eras	Shinengō	Imperial dynasty duration	Western calendar dates
	Taika		1305	645
	Hakuchi		1310	650
Saimei's reign			1315	655
Tenji's reign			1322	662
Kōbun's reign		Sujaku	1332	672
Temmu's reign		Hakuhō	1333	673
	Suchō		1346	686
Jitō's reign			1347	687
		Taika	1350	695
Mommu's reign			1357	697
	Taihō		1361	701

== Events of the Saimei period ==
- 654 (Hakuchi 4): Emperor Kōtoku, in the 10th year of his reign (孝徳天皇10年), dies at age 59; and his nephew and heir declines the succession (senso). Shortly thereafter, Empress Saimei formally accedes to the throne (sokui).
- 655 (Saimei 1) or "the 1st year of Saimei's reign (斉明天皇元年: A new period is marked by the beginning of the reign of Empress Saimei, but the end of the previous nengō in Hakuchi 6 did not presage the commencement of a new nengō. This dating system was allowed to lapse during Saimei's reign.
- 661 (Saimei 7, 7th month): Empress Saimei, in the 7th year of her reign (斉明天皇7年), designated her son as her heir; and modern scholars construe this as meaning that this son would have received the succession (senso) after her death or abdication. Shortly after she did die at age 68, Emperor Tenji could be said to have acceded to the throne (sokui).

== See also ==
- Regnal name
- List of Japanese era names

== Notes ==
Preceded by Hakuchi	nengō eras in abeyance	Succeeded by —
Preceded by Hakuchi	Saimei period Reign of Empress Saimei (655–662)	Succeeded by Tenji period
