= Monmu period =

Timeframe of Japanese history

The Monmu period is a chronological timeframe during the Asuka period of Japanese history. The Mommu period describes a span of years which were considered to have begun in the 1357th year of the imperial dynasty.

This periodization is consistent with the traditional dates asserted for the reign of Emperor Monmu, from 697 through 707.

== Periodization ==
The adoption of the Sexagenary cycle calendar (Jikkan Jūnishi) in Japan is attributed to Empress Suiko in 604; and this Chinese calendar continued in use throughout the Mommu period.

In 645, the system of Japanese era names (年号, nengō, "year name") was introduced. However, after the reign of Emperor Kōtoku, this method of segmenting time was temporarily abandoned or allowed to lapse. This interval continued during the Monmu period.

Neither Empress Mommu's reign nor the Monmu periodization are included in the list of nengō for this explicit duration of time, which comes after Suchō and before Taihō.

In the post-Taika or pre-Taihō chronology, the first year of Emperor Monmu's reign (文武天皇元年 or 文武統皇1年) is also construed as the first year of the Mommu period (文武1年).

== Non-nengō period ==
Non-nengō periods in the pre-Taihō calendar were published in 1880 by William Bramsen. These were refined in 1952 by Paul Tsuchihashi in Japanese Chronological Tables from 601 to 1872.

The pre-Tahiō calendar included two non-nengō gaps or intervals in the chronological series:

- Taika, August 645–February 650.
- Hakuchi, February 650–December 654.
  - Non-nengō dating systems
- Shuchō, July–September 686.
  - Non-nengō dating systems
- Taihō, March 701–May 704.

Nengō were not promulgated (or were allowed to lapse) during the gap years between Hakuchi and Shuchō, and in another gap between Shuchō and Taihō.

Concurrent Chronologies
Non-nengō periods	Nengō eras	Shinengō	Imperial dynasty duration	Western calendar dates
	Taika		1305	645
	Hakuchi		1310	650
Saimei's reign			1315	655
Tenji's reign			1322	662
Kōbun's reign		Sujaku	1332	672
Temmu's reign		Hakuhō	1333	673
	Suchō		1346	686
Jitō's reign			1347	687
		Taika	1350	695
Mommu's reign			1357	697
	Taihō		1361	701

== Events of the Mommu period ==
- 697 (Mommu 1): Empress Jitō abdicates; and her son receives the succession (senso). Shortly thereafter, Emperor Mommu formally accedes to the throne (sokui).
- 697 (Mommu 1): A new period could be said to have commenced at the beginning of the reign of any of the Japanese sovereigns after Kōtoku and including Mommu

== See also ==
- Regnal name
- List of Japanese era names

== Notes ==
Preceded by —	Nengō in abeyance	Succeeded by Taihō era
Preceded by Jitō period	Monmu period Reign of Emperor Monmu (686–697)	Succeeded by Taihō era
