= Tenji period =

Era of the Asuka period of Japanese history

The Tenji period is a brief span of years during the Asuka period of Japanese history. The Tenji period describes a span of years which were considered to have begun in the 1322nd year of the imperial dynasty.

The timespan is the same as the reign of Emperor Tenji, which is traditionally considered to have been from 662 through 672.

== Periodization ==
The adoption of the Sexagenary cycle calendar (Jikkan Jūnishi) in Japan is attributed to Empress Suiko in 604; and this Chinese calendar continued in use throughout the Tenji period.

In 645, the system of Japanese era names (年号,, nengō,, lit. "year name") was introduced. However, after the reign of Emperor Kotoku, this method of segmenting was temporarily abandoned or allowed to lapse. This interval continued during the Tenji period.

Neither the years of Emperor Tenji's reign nor the Tenji period are included in the list nengō for this explicit duration of time, which comes after Hakuchi and before Suchō.

In the post-Taika or pre-Taihō chronology, the first year of Emperor Tenji's reign (天智天皇元年 or 天智天皇1年) is also construed as the first year of the Tenji period (天智1年).

== Non-nengō period ==
Non-nengō periods in the pre-Taihō calendar were published in 1880 by William Bramsen. These were refined in 1952 by Paul Tuschihashi in Japanese Chronological Tables from 601 to 1872.

The pre-Tahiō calendar included two non-nengō gaps or intervals in the chronological series:

- Taika, August 645–February 650.
- Hakuchi, February 650–December 654.
  - Non-nengō dating systems
- Shuchō, July–September 686.
  - Non-nengō dating systems
- Taihō, March 701–May 704.

Nengō were not promulgated (or were allowed to lapse) during the gap years between Hakuchi and Shuchō, and in another gap between Shuchō and Taihō.

Concurrent Chronologies
Non-nengō periods	Nengō eras	Shinengō	Imperial dynasty duration	Western calendar dates
	Taika		1305	645
	Hakuchi		1310	650
Saimei's reign			1315	655
Tenji's reign			1322	662
Kōbun's reign		Sujaku	1332	672
Temmu's reign		Hakuhō	1333	673
	Suchō		1346	686
Jitō's reign			1347	687
		Taika	1350	695
Mommu's reign			1357	697
	Taihō		1361	701

== Events of the Tenji period ==
- 662 (Tenji 1): Empress Saimei dies; and her nephew delays receiving the succession (senso). Only years later does Emperor Tenji formally accede to the throne (sokui).
- 662 (Tenji 1): A new chronological time frame is marked by the beginning of the reign of Emperor Tenji
- 667 (Tenji 6): Six years after the death of Empress Saimei, her mausoleum was reconstructed. Naka no Ōe-shinnō had not yet been proclaimed as Emperor Tenji, which meant that he had not yet begun to create an official court around himself. In this year, he did at last establish his court at Ōtsu-no-Miya in the Ōmi Province, where his enthronement was belatedly scheduled for the springtime of the following year.
- 668 (Tenji 7): Emperor Tenji is formally enthroned.

== See also ==
- Jinshin War
- Regnal name
- List of Japanese era names

== Notes ==
Preceded by —	nengō in abeyance	Succeeded by —
Preceded by Saimei period	Tenji period Reign of Emperor Tenji (662–672)	Succeeded by Kōbun period
