= Tenmu period =

Japanese chronological timeframe

The Temmu period is a chronological timeframe during the Asuka period of Japanese history. The Temmu period describes a span of years which were considered to have begun in the 1333rd year of the imperial dynasty.

This periodization is congruent with the reign of Emperor Tenmu, which is traditionally considered to have been from 673 through 686.

== Periodization ==
The adoption of the Sexagenary cycle calendar (Jikkan Jūnishi) in Japan is attributed to Empress Suiko in 604; and this Chinese calendar continued in use throughout the Tenmu period.

In 645, the system of Japanese era names (年号,, nengō,; "year name") was introduced. However, after the reign of Emperor Kōtoku, this method of segmenting time was temporarily abandoned or allowed to lapse. This interval continues during the Tenmu period.

Neither Emperor Tenmu's reign nor the Tenmu periodization are included in the list of nengō for this explicit duration of time. The Hakuhō period (白鳳時代, hakuhō jidai; lit. "white phoenix") was an unofficial nengō during the reign of Emperor Temmu after Hakuchi and before Suchō. The duration of this discrete non-nengō timespan lasted for 15 years.

In the post-Taika or pre-Taihō chronology, the first year of Emperor Tenmu's reign (年号天皇元年 or 年号天皇1年) is also construed as the first year of the Temmu period (年号1年).

== Non-nengō period ==
Non-nengō periods in the pre-Taihō calendar were published in 1880 by William Bramsen. These were refined in 1952 by Paul Tsuchihashi in Japanese Chronological Tables from 601 to 1872.

The pre-Tahiō calendar included two non-nengō gaps or intervals in the chronological series:

- Taika, August 645–February 650.
- Hakuchi, February 650–December 654.
  - Non-nengō dating systems
- Shuchō, July–September 686.
  - Non-nengō dating systems
- Taihō, March 701–May 704.

Nengō were not promulgated (or were allowed to lapse) during the gap years between Hakuchi and Shuchō, and in another gap between Shuchō and Taihō.

Concurrent Chronologies
Non-nengō periods	Nengō eras	Shinengō	Imperial dynasty duration	Western calendar dates
	Taika		1305	645
	Hakuchi		1310	650
Saimei's reign			1315	655
Tenji's reign			1322	662
Kōbun's reign		Sujaku	1332	672
Temmu's reign		Hakuhō	1333	673
	Suchō		1346	686
Jitō's reign			1347	687
		Taika	1350	695
Mommu's reign			1357	697
	Taihō		1361	701

== Events of Temmu period ==
- 673 (Kōbun 2): Emperor Tenji dies; and his son, Ō-ama-shinnō (later to become Emperor Tenmu), declines to receive the succession (senso). Shortly thereafter, his older brother, Ōtomo (posthumously known as Emperor Kōbun after 1870), formally accedes to the throne (sokui). Anticipating trouble will foment around his brother, Emperor Kōbun leads an army against his brother. The forces defending against Kōbun's attack are ultimately successful, and belatedly, the son whom Emperor Tenji had designated heir accepts senso and sokui.
- 673 (Temmu 1): A new period is marked by the beginning of the reign of Emperor Temmu
- 674 (Temmu 2): Ambassadors of Tane no kuni were received in the Japanese court.
- 680 (Temmu 8): Yakushi-ji was founded in the Hakuhou period

== See also ==
- Regnal name
- List of Japanese era names

== Notes ==
Preceded by —	nengō in abeyance	Succeeded by Shuchō
Preceded by Kōbun period	Temmu period Reign of Emperor Tenmu (673–686)	Succeeded by Jitō period
