= Taika =

Taika may refer to:

- Taika (era) (大化), Japanese era name for years spanning 645 through 650
- Taika Reform (大化の改新, Taika no Kaishin), a major reform promulgated during the Taika era

== People ==
- Taika Waititi, New Zealand filmmaker
