= Kobun =

Kobun could refer to:

== People ==
- Prince Ōtomo (648–672), posthumous title Emperor Kōbun, briefly ruler of the imperial Japanese court
- Kōbun Chino Otogawa (1938–2002), Japanese-born American Sōtō Zen priest
- Kōbun Shizuno (born 1972), Japanese anime film and television director
- Kōbun, a Japanese Yakuza who has taken a blood oath of allegiance to an oyabun, the head of a Yakuza clan

== Other uses ==
- Kōbun (period), the timeframe of the brief reign of Emperor Kōbun
- Another name for Classical Japanese, the literary form of the Japanese language that was the standard until the early Shōwa period
- The original Japanese name of Servbot, an advertising character for video game developer Capcom
