= 687 =

Calendar year

687 in various calendars
Gregorian calendar	687; DCLXXXVII
Ab urbe condita	1440
Armenian calendar	136; ԹՎ ՃԼԶ
Assyrian calendar	5437
Balinese saka calendar	608–609
Bengali calendar	93–94
Berber calendar	1637
Buddhist calendar	1231
Burmese calendar	49
Byzantine calendar	6195–6196
Chinese calendar	丙戌年 (Fire Dog); 3384 or 3177 — to — 丁亥年 (Fire Pig); 3385 or 3178
Coptic calendar	403–404
Discordian calendar	1853
Ethiopian calendar	679–680
Hebrew calendar	4447–4448
- Hindu calendars
Vikram Samvat	743–744
Shaka Samvat	608–609
Kali Yuga	3787–3788
Holocene calendar	10687
Iranian calendar	65–66
Islamic calendar	67–68
Japanese calendar	Shuchō 2 (朱鳥２年)
Javanese calendar	579–580
Julian calendar	687; DCLXXXVII
Korean calendar	3020
Minguo calendar	1225 before ROC 民前1225年
Nanakshahi calendar	−781
Seleucid era	998/999 AG
Thai solar calendar	1229–1230
Tibetan calendar	མེ་ཕོ་ཁྱི་ལོ་ (male Fire-Dog); 813 or 432 or −340 — to — མེ་མོ་ཕག་ལོ་ (female Fire-Boar); 814 or 433 or −339

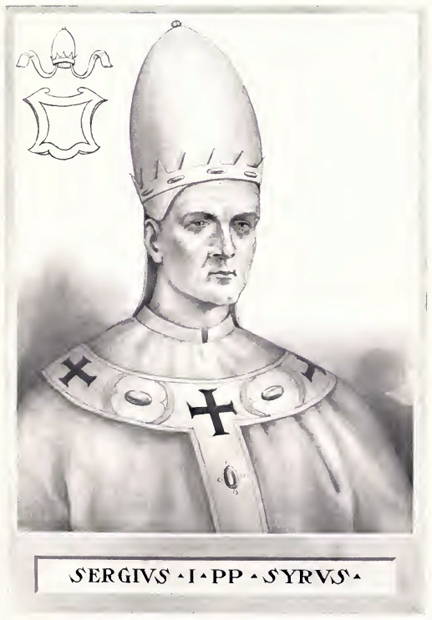
Pope Sergius I (687–701)

Year 687 (DCLXXXVII) was a common year starting on Tuesday of the Julian calendar. The denomination 687 for this year has been used since the early medieval period, when the Anno Domini calendar era became the prevalent method in Europe for naming years.

== Events ==
=== By place ===
==== East Asia ====
- Ilterish Qaghan leads the Göktürks northward from Inner Mongolia and occupies the Mongolian Plateau, marking the restoration of the Turkic Khaganate.

==== Byzantine Empire ====
- Emperor Justinian II negotiates a peace treaty with the Umayyad Caliphate (resulting in caliph Abd al-Malik paying tribute). He removes 12,000 Christian Maronites, who continually resist the Arabs, from Lebanon. Justinian reinforces the Byzantine navy on Cyprus, and transfers cavalry troops from the Thracesian Theme in Anatolia to the Theme of Thrace in the Balkan Peninsula.

==== Europe ====
- Battle of Tertry: King Theuderic III of Neustria is defeated by Pepin of Herstal, mayor of the palace of Austrasia, near Péronne (modern France), at the River Somme. Theuderic withdraws to Paris and is forced to sign a peace treaty. Pepin becomes "de facto" ruler of the Frankish Kingdom, and begins calling himself Duke of the Franks. He establishes a base for the future rise of the Pippinids and the Carolingians. Pepin appoints Nordebert as Duke of Burgundy, and puts him in charge of Neustria and Burgundy (as a sort of regent).
- King Erwig dies after a 7-year reign, and is succeeded by his son-in-law Ergica as ruler of the Visigothic Kingdom.

===== Britain =====
- King Mul of Kent and 12 companions are burnt to death, during a Kentish uprising. His brother, King Cædwalla of Wessex, ravages the kingdom in revenge.
- Adomnán, Irish abbot of Iona, visits the court of King Ecgfrith, to ransom Irish captives (60 Gaels who had been captured in a Northumbrian raid).

=== By topic ===
==== Religion ====
- Cuthbert, bishop of Lindisfarne, resigns his office and retires to his hermitage on Inner Farne (Northumberland) where he dies, after a painful illness.
- September 21 – Pope Conon I dies at Rome after a 1-year reign, and is succeeded by Sergius I as the 84th pope of the Catholic Church.
- Construction of the Dome of the Rock, located on the Temple Mount, is started in Jerusalem (approximate date).

== Births ==
- Eucherius, Frankish bishop (d. 743)
- Wei Jiansu, chancellor of the Tang dynasty (d. 763)
- Wittiza, king of the Visigoths (approximate date)

== Deaths ==
- March 20 – Cuthbert, Anglo-Saxon bishop
- September 21 – Pope Conon I
- Abd Allah ibn Abbas, cousin of Muhammad
- Erwig, king of the Visigoths
- Mul, king of Kent (England)
- Romuald I
- Wamba, king of the Visigoths
