= 697 =

Calendar year

697 in various calendars
- Gregorian calendar: 697; DCXCVII
- Ab urbe condita: 1450
- Armenian calendar: 146; ԹՎ ՃԽԶ
- Assyrian calendar: 5447
- Balinese saka calendar: 618–619
- Bengali calendar: 103–104
- Berber calendar: 1647
- Buddhist calendar: 1241
- Burmese calendar: 59
- Byzantine calendar: 6205–6206
- Chinese calendar: 丙申年 (Fire Monkey); 3394 or 3187 — to — 丁酉年 (Fire Rooster); 3395 or 3188
- Coptic calendar: 413–414
- Discordian calendar: 1863
- Ethiopian calendar: 689–690
- Hebrew calendar: 4457–4458
- Hindu calendars
- Vikram Samvat: 753–754
- Shaka Samvat: 618–619
- Kali Yuga: 3797–3798
- Holocene calendar: 10697
- Iranian calendar: 75–76
- Islamic calendar: 77–78
- Japanese calendar: Shuchō 12 (朱鳥１２年)
- Javanese calendar: 589–590
- Julian calendar: 697; DCXCVII
- Korean calendar: 3030
- Minguo calendar: 1215 before ROC 民前1215年
- Nanakshahi calendar: −771
- Seleucid era: 1008/1009 AG
- Thai solar calendar: 1239–1240
- Tibetan calendar: མེ་ཕོ་སྤྲེ་ལོ་ (male Fire-Monkey); 823 or 442 or −330 — to — མེ་མོ་བྱ་ལོ་ (female Fire-Bird); 824 or 443 or −329

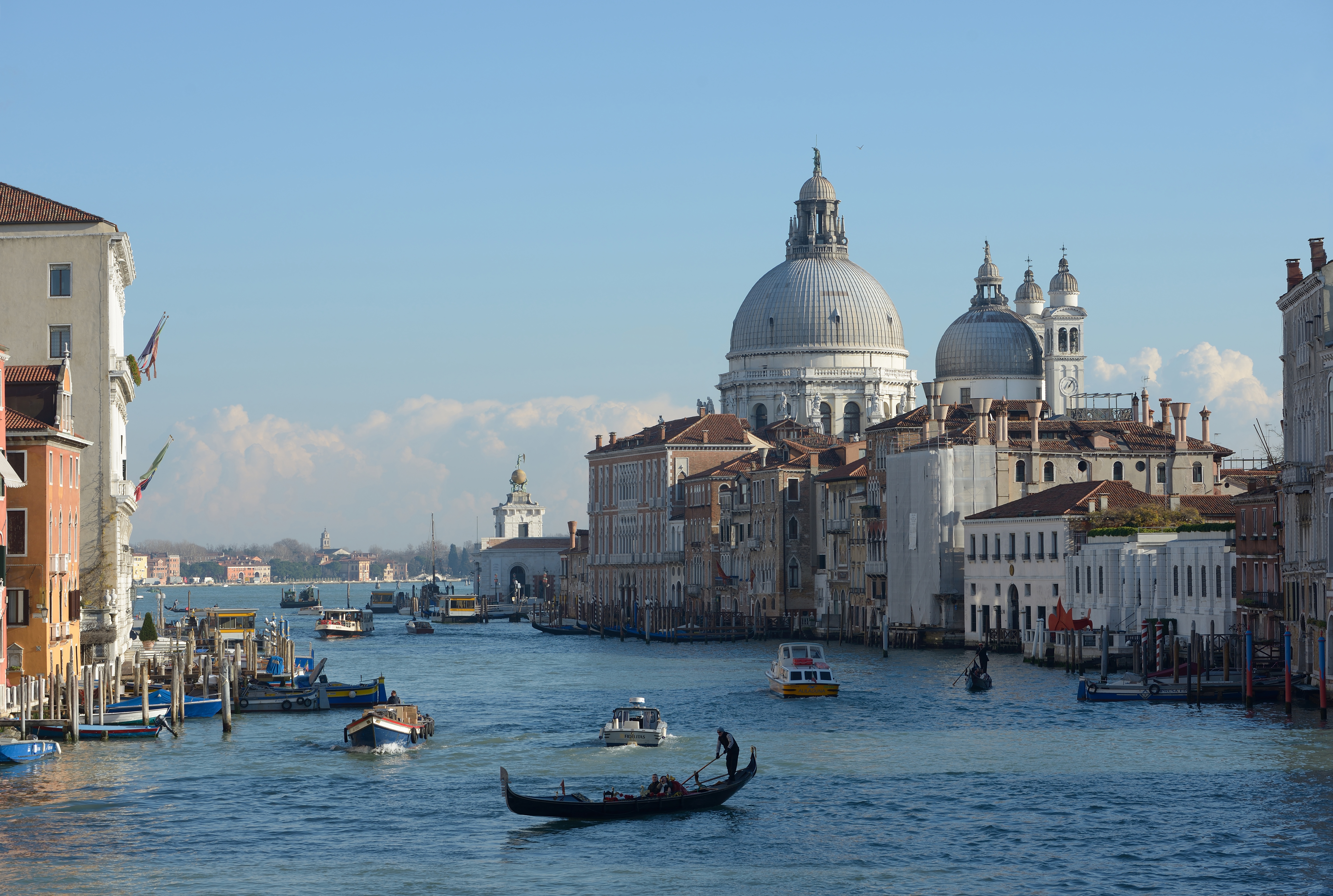
The Grand Canal in Venice (Italy)

Year 697 (DCXCVII) was a common year starting on Monday of the Julian calendar. The denomination 697 for this year has been used since the early medieval period, when the Anno Domini calendar era became the prevalent method in Europe for naming years.

== Events ==
=== By place ===
==== Europe ====
- Paolo Lucio Anafesto is elected the first Doge of Venice, which begins its rise as a major power in the Mediterranean Sea. Built up from fishing villages settled by fugitives from the Huns (see 452), the city of Venice occupies some 60 marshy islands (Venetian Lagoon).
- Radbod, king of the Frisians, retreats to the island of Heligoland in the North Sea (approximate date).

==== Britain ====
- Queen Osthryth of Mercia is murdered by her own noblemen. She is buried at Bardney Abbey (Lincolnshire), and later revered as a saint.

==== Arabian Empire ====
- Syrian forces under Al-Hajjaj ibn Yusuf, governor of Iraq, defeat the Persian Kharijites, who have captured the city of Mosul and occupy large parts of Mesopotamia (approximate date).

==== Asia ====
- Empress Jitō abdicates the throne in favor of the 14-year-old Monmu (grandson of late emperor Tenmu). During her 11-year reign she has established the foundations of law in Japan.

==== Mesoamerica ====
- The Mayan city of Bahlam Jol is destroyed by Naranjo as retaliation for rebelling against its suzerain.

=== By topic ===
==== Religion ====
- Council of Birr: The northern part of Ireland accepts the Roman calculations for celebrating Easter. At this synod Adomnán, abbot of Iona (Scotland), promulgates his Cáin Adomnáin ("Law of the Innocents").
- A festival, for the opening of the eyes of Buddhist images, is held in Yakushi-ji Temple in Japan (approximate date).

== Births ==
- Fang Guan, chancellor of the Tang dynasty (d. 763)
- Guo Ziyi, general of the Tang dynasty (d. 781)
- Osred I, king of Northumbria (approximate date)

== Deaths ==
- Eochaid mac Domangairt, king of Dál Riata
- Ferchar Fota, king of Dál Riata (Scotland)
- Hugobert, Merovingian noblemen (seneschal)
- Nordebert, mayor of the palace of Neustria
- Osthryth, queen of Mercia (English Midlands)
