= 781 =

Calendar year

781 in various calendars
Gregorian calendar	781; DCCLXXXI
Ab urbe condita	1534
Armenian calendar	230; ԹՎ ՄԼ
Assyrian calendar	5531
Balinese saka calendar	702–703
Bengali calendar	187–188
Berber calendar	1731
Buddhist calendar	1325
Burmese calendar	143
Byzantine calendar	6289–6290
Chinese calendar	庚申年 (Metal Monkey); 3478 or 3271 — to — 辛酉年 (Metal Rooster); 3479 or 3272
Coptic calendar	497–498
Discordian calendar	1947
Ethiopian calendar	773–774
Hebrew calendar	4541–4542
- Hindu calendars
Vikram Samvat	837–838
Shaka Samvat	702–703
Kali Yuga	3881–3882
Holocene calendar	10781
Iranian calendar	159–160
Islamic calendar	164–165
Japanese calendar	Hōki 12 / Ten'ō 1 (天応元年)
Javanese calendar	676–677
Julian calendar	781; DCCLXXXI
Korean calendar	3114
Minguo calendar	1131 before ROC 民前1131年
Nanakshahi calendar	−687
Seleucid era	1092/1093 AG
Thai solar calendar	1323–1324
Tibetan calendar	ལྕགས་ཕོ་སྤྲེ་ལོ་ (male Iron-Monkey); 907 or 526 or −246 — to — ལྕགས་མོ་བྱ་ལོ་ (female Iron-Bird); 908 or 527 or −245

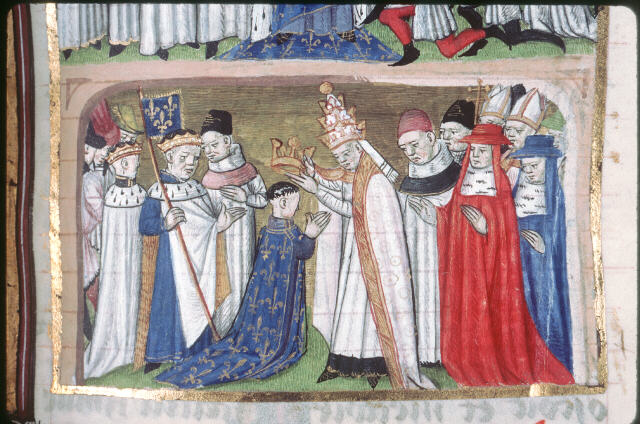
Coronation of Louis the Pious as sub-king of Italy and Aquitaine by pope Adrian I

Year 781 (DCCLXXXI) was a common year starting on Monday of the Julian calendar. The denomination 781 for this year has been used since the early medieval period, when the Anno Domini calendar era became the prevalent method in Europe for naming years.

== Events ==
=== By place ===
==== Europe ====
- King Charlemagne has his son Carloman (renamed Pepin) anointed "King of Italy", and he is crowned by Pope Adrian I with the Iron Crown of Lombardy. His younger brother Charles I is anointed king of Aquitaine, and Louis the Pious (only 3-years old) is appointed sub-king of Italy and Aquitaine, following the conversion of Aquitaine from a Duchy to a sub-kingdom.
- Charlemagne meets Alcuin, Anglo-Saxon missionary, in Italy, and invites him to Aachen, where he becomes Charlemagne's chief adviser on religious and educational matters (approximate date).
- The Frankish currency called the livre carolingienne is minted for the first time (approximate date).

==== Asia ====
- Yang Yan, Chinese statesman, commits suicide after being accused of bribery and corruption. He is credited with reforming the tax system for peasants, reducing the power of the aristocratic classes, and eliminating their tax-free estates.
- April 30 – Emperor Kōnin of Japan abdicates the throne after an 11-year reign, in favour of his half-Korean son, Kanmu.
- July 31 – The oldest recorded eruption of Mount Fuji occurs (Traditional Japanese date: July 6, 781).
- New city of Bian (汴) is constructed on the site of Kaifeng during the Tang dynasty (China).
- Marriage of Abbasid prince Harun ibn al-Mahdi (future caliph Harun al-Rashid) and Zubaidah bint Ja'far.

=== By topic ===
==== Religion ====
- Charlemagne defines the Papal territory (see Papal States). He codifies the regions over which the pope would be temporal sovereign: the Duchy of Rome is expanded by Ravenna, the Duchy of the Pentapolis, parts of the Duchy of Benevento, Tuscany, Corsica and Lombardy.
- Nestorians in China build Christian monasteries, and erect the Nestorian Stele (approximate date).

== Births ==
- Harith al-Muhasibi, founder of the Baghdad School of Islamic philosophy, and a teacher of the Sufi masters Junayd al-Baghdadi and Sari al-Saqti (d. 857)

== Deaths ==
- Alchmund, bishop of Hexham (approximate date)
- King Fergus mac Echdach of Dál Riata (Scotland)
- Guo Ziyi, general of the Tang dynasty (b. 697)
- Isonokami no Yakatsugu, Japanese nobleman (b. 723)
- Yang Yan, chancellor of the Tang dynasty (b. 727)
