= 763 =

Calendar year

763 in various calendars
- Gregorian calendar: 763; DCCLXIII
- Ab urbe condita: 1516
- Armenian calendar: 212; ԹՎ ՄԺԲ
- Assyrian calendar: 5513
- Balinese saka calendar: 684–685
- Bengali calendar: 169–170
- Berber calendar: 1713
- Buddhist calendar: 1307
- Burmese calendar: 125
- Byzantine calendar: 6271–6272
- Chinese calendar: 壬寅年 (Water Tiger); 3460 or 3253 — to — 癸卯年 (Water Rabbit); 3461 or 3254
- Coptic calendar: 479–480
- Discordian calendar: 1929
- Ethiopian calendar: 755–756
- Hebrew calendar: 4523–4524
- Hindu calendars
- Vikram Samvat: 819–820
- Shaka Samvat: 684–685
- Kali Yuga: 3863–3864
- Holocene calendar: 10763
- Iranian calendar: 141–142
- Islamic calendar: 145–146
- Japanese calendar: Tenpyō-hōji 7 (天平宝字７年)
- Javanese calendar: 657–658
- Julian calendar: 763; DCCLXIII
- Korean calendar: 3096
- Minguo calendar: 1149 before ROC 民前1149年
- Nanakshahi calendar: −705
- Seleucid era: 1074/1075 AG
- Thai solar calendar: 1305–1306
- Tibetan calendar: ཆུ་ཕོ་སྟག་ལོ་ (male Water-Tiger); 889 or 508 or −264 — to — ཆུ་མོ་ཡོས་ལོ་ (female Water-Hare); 890 or 509 or −263

Year 763 (DCCLXIII) was a common year starting on Saturday of the Julian calendar. The denomination 763 for this year has been used since the early medieval period, when the Anno Domini calendar era became the prevalent method in Europe for naming years.

== Events ==
=== By place ===
==== Byzantine Empire ====
- June – Battle of Anchialus: Emperor Constantine V sends a Byzantine expeditionary force (800 ships and 9,600 cavalry) to Thrace, to defend the fortress city of Anchialus on the Black Sea Coast. Meanwhile, Telets, ruler (khagan) of the Bulgarian Empire, blocks the mountain passes and takes positions on the heights near Anchialus. During a desperate cavalry charge, the Bulgars are defeated and many are captured; Telets manages to escape. Constantine enters Constantinople in triumph, and kills all the prisoners.

==== Europe ====
- August – Byzantine troops invade the Papal States, in alliance with King Desiderius of the Lombards. King Pepin III ("the Short") intervenes, and begins negotiations between the Lombards and Pope Paul I. Desiderius promises to end the hostilities, but on condition that Pepin sends back Lombard hostages held by the Franks.

==== Britain ====
- Ciniod I succeeds Bridei V, as king of the Picts (modern Scotland).

==== Abbasid Caliphate ====
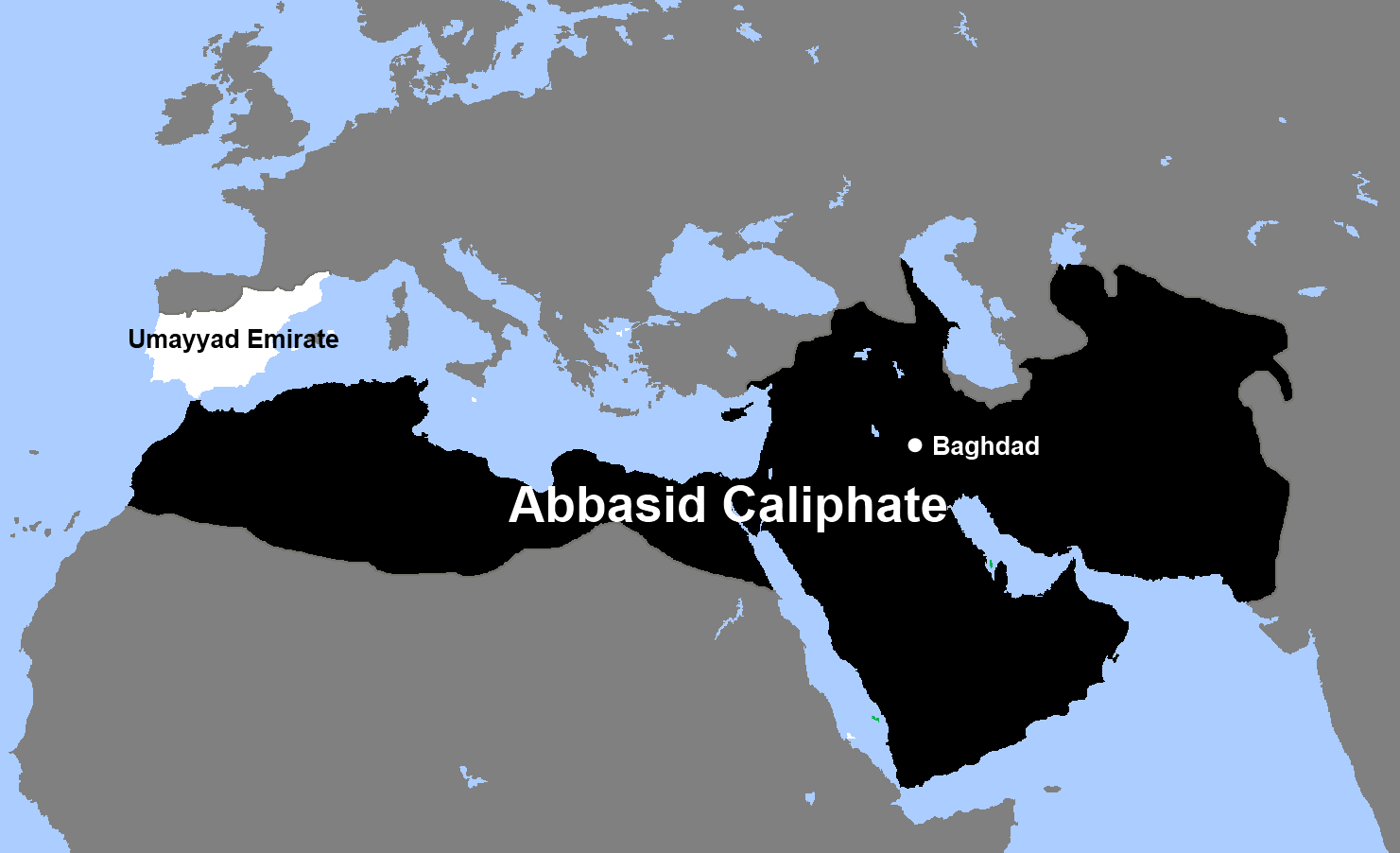
Abbasid Caliphate under Al-Mansur (r. 754–775) in black and Emirate of Córdoba in white

- In 763 Al-Mansur sent his troops to conquer Al-Andalus for the Abbasid empire. But the ruler Abd al-Rahman I successfully defended his territory. Al-Mansur withdrew and thereafter focused his troops on holding the eastern part of his empire on lands that were once part of Persia.
- January 21 – Battle of Bakhamra: The Abbasid army under Isa ibn Musa defeats the Alids, and puts an end to their rebellion. The power of the Abbasid dynasty is consolidated.

==== Asia ====
- February 17 – An Lushan Rebellion: Emperor Shi Chaoyi hangs himself to avoid being captured by Tang troops sent by the renegade Li Huaixian, ending the 7-year rebellion against the Tang dynasty in China.
- November 18 – Forces of the Tibetan Empire, under Trisong Detsen, occupy the Tang capital of Chang'an (modern Xi'an) for 15 days, and install a puppet emperor. Tibetans take over the horse pastures.

==== Central America ====
- July 2 – Yax Pasaj Chan Yopaat ("Rising Sun") becomes the new ruler of the Mayan city state of Copán in Honduras after the death of Kʼakʼ Yipyaj Chan Kʼawiil, who had reigned since 749. Yax Pasaj reigns until 810.

== Births ==
- Haito, bishop of Basel
- Harun al-Rashid, Muslim caliph (or 766)
- Wang, empress of the Tang dynasty (d. 816)

== Deaths ==
- November 20 – Domnall Midi, High King of Ireland
- Bridei V, king of the Picts
- Fang Guan, chancellor of the Tang dynasty (b. 697)
- Jianzhen, Chinese Buddhist monk (b. 688)
- Shi Chaoyi, emperor of the Yan (Anshi) state
- Wei Jiansu, chancellor of the Tang dynasty (b. 687)
