= 696 =

Calendar year

696 in various calendars
Gregorian calendar	696; DCXCVI
Ab urbe condita	1449
Armenian calendar	145; ԹՎ ՃԽԵ
Assyrian calendar	5446
Balinese saka calendar	617–618
Bengali calendar	102–103
Berber calendar	1646
Buddhist calendar	1240
Burmese calendar	58
Byzantine calendar	6204–6205
Chinese calendar	乙未年 (Wood Goat); 3393 or 3186 — to — 丙申年 (Fire Monkey); 3394 or 3187
Coptic calendar	412–413
Discordian calendar	1862
Ethiopian calendar	688–689
Hebrew calendar	4456–4457
- Hindu calendars
Vikram Samvat	752–753
Shaka Samvat	617–618
Kali Yuga	3796–3797
Holocene calendar	10696
Iranian calendar	74–75
Islamic calendar	76–77
Japanese calendar	Shuchō 11 (朱鳥１１年)
Javanese calendar	588–589
Julian calendar	696; DCXCVI
Korean calendar	3029
Minguo calendar	1216 before ROC 民前1216年
Nanakshahi calendar	−772
Seleucid era	1007/1008 AG
Thai solar calendar	1238–1239
Tibetan calendar	ཤིང་མོ་ལུག་ལོ་ (female Wood-Sheep); 822 or 441 or −331 — to — མེ་ཕོ་སྤྲེ་ལོ་ (male Fire-Monkey); 823 or 442 or −330

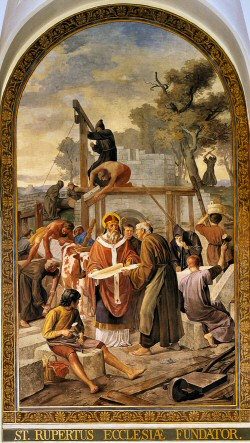
Rupert of Salzburg (c. 660–710)

Year 696 (DCXCVI) was a leap year starting on Saturday of the Julian calendar. The denomination 696 for this year has been used since the early medieval period, when the Anno Domini calendar era became the prevalent method in Europe for naming years.

== Events ==
=== By topic ===
==== Religion ====
- St. Peter's Abbey is founded by Rupert, bishop of Worms, at Salzburg (modern Austria).

== Births ==
- Vijayaditya, king of the Chalukya dynasty (d. 733)
- Kim Gyo-gak, Korean Buddhist monk (d. 794)

=== Disputed ===
- Osred I of Northumbria, King of Northumbria from 705 until his death in 716.

== Deaths ==
- August 13 – Takechi, Japanese prince (b. c. 654)
- Domnall Donn, king of Dál Riata (Scotland)
- Vinayaditya of Vatapi, king of the Chalukya dynasty and predecessor of Vijayaditya.
- Woncheuk, Korean Buddhist monk (b. c. 613)

=== Disputed ===
- Chlodulf, bishop of Metz (b. 605)
- Aldetrude, Christian saint
