= Keiun =

Period of Japanese history (704–708 CE)

Keiun (慶雲), also known as Kyōun, was a Japanese era name (年号, nengō, "year name") following Taihō and preceding Wadō. The period spanned the years from May 704 through January 708. The reigning emperors were Monmu-tennō (文武天皇) and Genmei-tennō (元明天皇).

== Change of era ==
- 704 Keiun gannen (慶雲元年): The new era name was created to mark an event or series of events. The previous era ended and the new one commenced in Taihō 4, on the 7th day of the 5th month of 704.

== Events of the Keiun era ==
- 707 (Keiun 4): Emperor Monmu dies, but his son and heir was deemed too young to receive the succession (senso). Instead, the mother of the heir formally accedes to the throne (sokui) as Empress Gemmei until her son would grow mature enough to accept senso and sokui.
- 18 July 707 (Keiun 4, 15th day of the 6th month): Genmei is enthroned at the age of 48.
- 707 (Keiun 4): Deposits of copper was reported to have been found in Musashi Province in the region which includes modern day Tokyo.
- 708 (Keiun 5):, The era name was about to be changed to mark the accession of Empress Genmei; but the choice of Wadō as the new nengō for this new reign became a way to mark the welcome discovery of copper in the Chichibu District of what is now Saitama Prefecture. The Japanese word for copper is dō (銅); and since this was indigenous copper, the "wa" (the ancient Chinese term for Japan) could be combined with the "dō" (copper) to create a new composite term—"wadō"—meaning "Japanese copper."

== Notes ==
Preceded by Taihō	Era or nengō Keiun; 704–708	Succeeded by Wadō
