= Japanese era name =

Name given to the regnal years of a Japanese emperor

The Japanese era name (Japanese: 元号, Hepburn: gengō; "era name") or nengō (年号, year name), is the first of the two elements that identify years in the Japanese era calendar scheme. The second element is a number which indicates the year number within the era (with the first year being "gan (元)", meaning "origin, basis"), followed by the literal "nen (年)" meaning "year".

Era names originated in 140 BCE in Imperial China, during the reign of the Emperor Wu of Han. As elsewhere in the Sinosphere, the use of era names was originally derived from Chinese imperial practice, although the Japanese system is independent of the Chinese, Korean, and Vietnamese era name systems. Unlike its other Sinosphere counterparts, Japanese era names are still in official use. Government offices usually require era names and years for official papers.

The five era names used since the end of the Edo period in 1868 can be abbreviated by taking the first letter of their romanized names. For example, S55 means Shōwa 55 (i.e. 1980), and H22 stands for Heisei 22 (2010). At 62 years and 2 weeks, Shōwa is the longest era to date.

The Reiwa (令和) era began on 1 May 2019, the day of accession of Naruhito to the throne as the 126th Emperor of Japan, following the day of the planned and voluntary abdication of his father, the 125th Emperor, Akihito. Emperor Akihito had received special permission to abdicate, rather than serving in his role until his death, as is the rule. The Reiwa era follows the 31st and final year of the Heisei era (平成31年), which had started on the day after the death of Emperor Hirohito on 8 January 1989.

== Overview ==
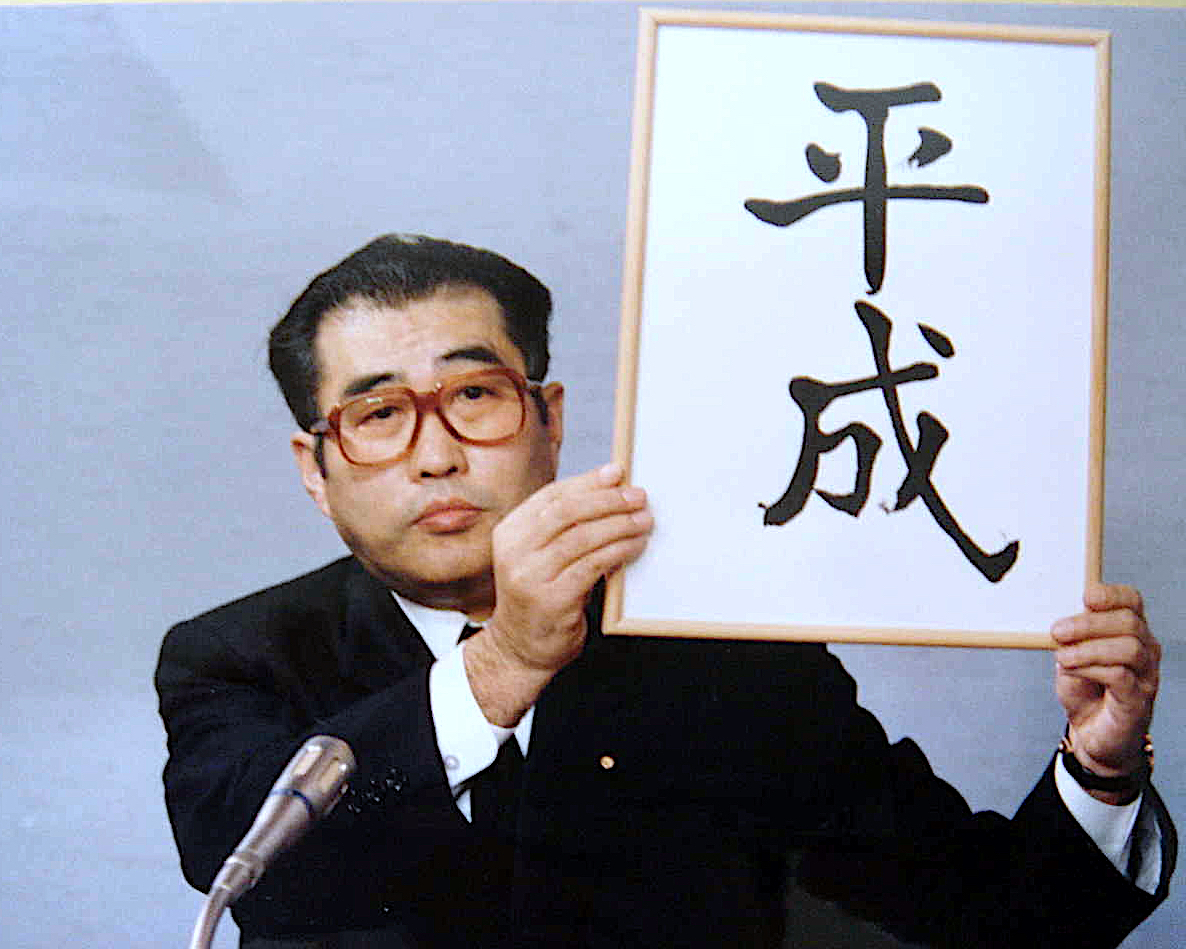
Keizō Obuchi, Chief Cabinet Secretary, announces the name of the new era "Heisei" (平成), on 7 January 1989.

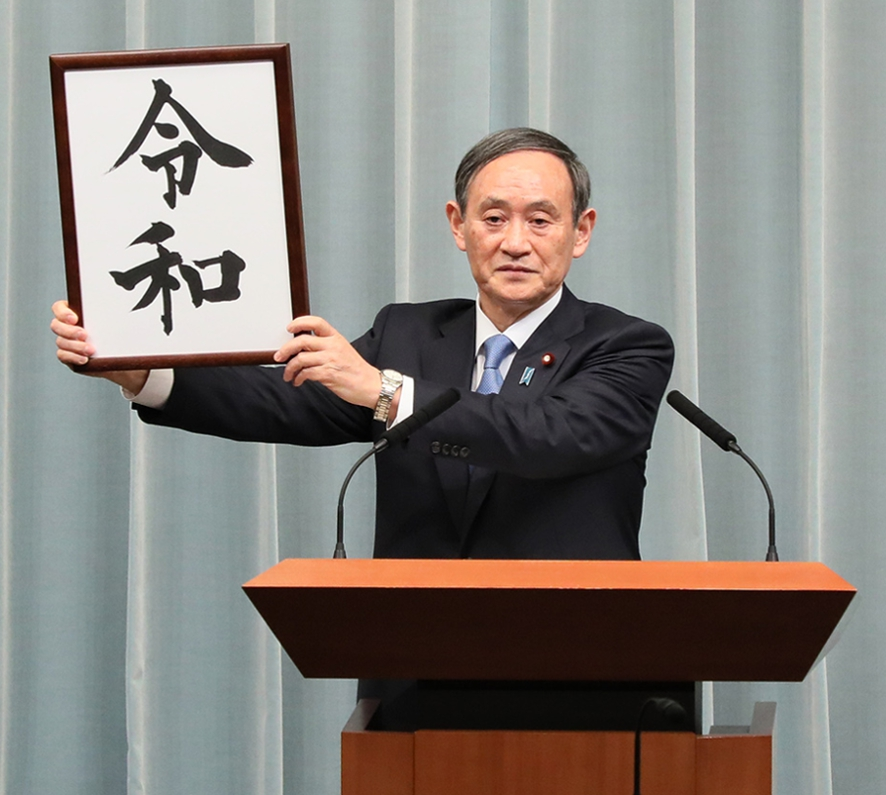
Yoshihide Suga, Chief Cabinet Secretary, announces the name of the new era "Reiwa" (令和) at the Prime Minister's Official Residence, on 1 April 2019.

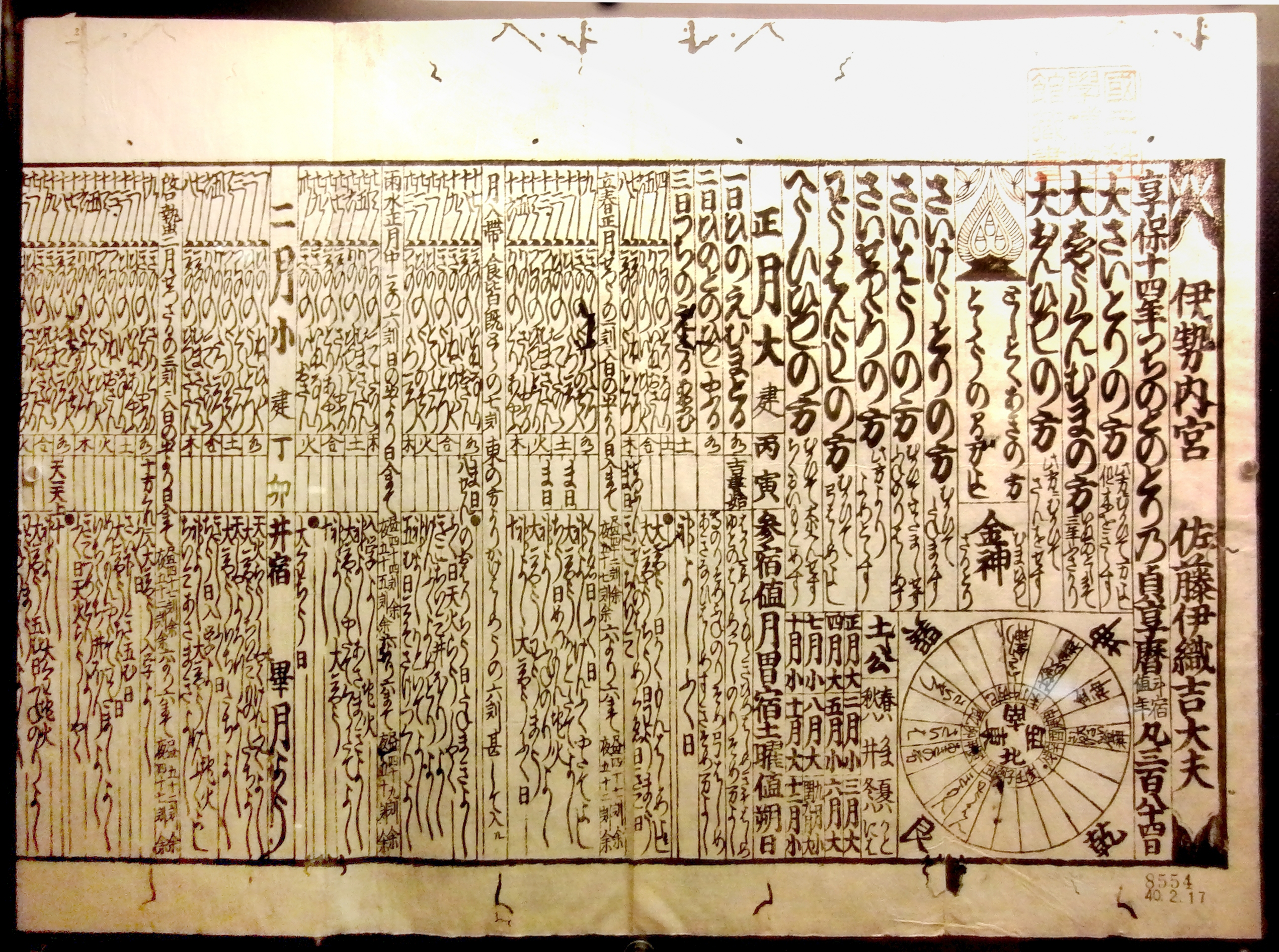
1729 Japanese calendar, which used the Jōkyō calendar procedure, published by Ise Grand Shrine

External Timeline	A graphical timeline is available at Japanese era names

The system on which the Japanese era names are based originated in China in 140 BCE, and was adopted by Japan in 645 CE, during the reign of Emperor Kōtoku.

The first era name to be assigned was "Taika" (大化), celebrating the political and organizational changes which were to flow from the great Taika reform (大化の改新) of 645. Although the regular practice of proclaiming successive era names was interrupted in the late seventh century, it was permanently re-adopted in 701 during the reign of Emperor Monmu (697–707). Since then, era names have been used continuously up through the present day.

=== Historical nengō ===
Prior to the Meiji period, era names were decided by court officials and were subjected to frequent change. A new era name was usually proclaimed within a year or two after the ascension of a new emperor. A new era name was also often designated on the first, fifth and 58th years of the sexagenary cycle, because they were inauspicious years in Onmyōdō. These three years are respectively known as kakurei, kakuun, and kakumei, and collectively known as sankaku. Era names were also changed due to other felicitous events or natural disasters.

In historical practice, the first day of a nengō (元年, gannen) starts whenever the emperor chooses; and the first year continues until the next lunar new year, which is understood to be the start of the nengō's second year.

Era names indicate the various reasons for their adoption. For instance, the nengō Wadō (和銅), during the Nara period, was declared due to the discovery of copper deposits in Chichibu (wa (和) meaning "Japan", and dō (銅) meaning "copper"). Most nengō are composed of two kanji, except for a short time during the Nara period when four-kanji names were sometimes adopted to follow the Chinese trend. Tenpyō Kanpō (天平感宝), Tenpyō Shōhō (天平勝宝), Tenpyō Hōji (天平宝字) and Tenpyō Jingo (天平神護) are some famous nengō names that use four characters. Since the Heian period, Confucian thoughts and ideas have been reflected in era names, such as Daidō (大同), Kōnin (弘仁) and Tenchō (天長). Although there currently exist a total of 248 Japanese era names, only 73 kanji have been used in composing them. Out of these 73 kanji, 31 of them have been used only once, while the rest have been used repeatedly in different combinations.

The vast majority of Japanese era names were used for less than 10 years, with two being used for less than a year. Only 28 have been used for more than 10 years and less than 30 years. Only Heisei, Ōei, Meiji, and Shōwa have been used for more than 30 years.

=== Nengō in modern Japan ===
Mutsuhito assumed the throne in 1867, during the third year of the Keiō (慶応) era. On 23 October 1868, the era name was changed to "Meiji" (明治), and a "one reign, one era name" (一世一元, issei-ichigen) system was adopted, wherein era names would change only upon immediate imperial succession. This system is similar to the now-defunct Chinese system used since the days of the Ming dynasty, in which the era name was not updated until the year following the emperor's death.

In modern practice, the first year of a nengō (元年, gannen) starts immediately upon the emperor's accession and ends on 31 December. Subsequent years follow the Gregorian calendar. For example, the Meiji era lasted until 30 July 1912, when the Emperor died and the Taishō (大正) era was proclaimed. 1912 is therefore known as both "Meiji 45" and "Taishō 1" (大正元年, Taishō gannen), although Meiji technically ended on 30 July with Mutsuhito's death.

This practice, implemented successfully since the days of Meiji but never formalized, became law in 1979 with the passage of the Era Name Law (元号法, gengō-hō). Thus, since 1868, there have only been five era names assigned: Meiji, Taishō, Shōwa, Heisei, and Reiwa, each corresponding with the rule of only one emperor. Upon death, the emperor is thereafter referred to by the era of his reign. For example, Mutsuhito is posthumously known as "Emperor Meiji" (明治天皇, Meiji Tennō).

It is protocol in Japan that the reigning emperor be referred to as Tennō Heika (天皇陛下; "His Majesty the Emperor") or Kinjō Tennō (今上天皇; "current emperor"). To call the current emperor by the current era name, i.e. "Reiwa", even in English, is a faux pas, as this will be his posthumous name. Use of the emperor's given name (i.e., "Naruhito") is rare, and is considered vulgar behaviour in Japanese.

== Periods without era names ==
The era name system that was introduced by Emperor Kōtoku was abandoned after his death; no era names were designated between 654 and 686. The system was briefly reinstated by Emperor Tenmu in 686, but was again abandoned upon his death about two months later. In 701, Emperor Monmu once again reinstated the era name system, and it has continued uninterrupted through today.

Although use of the Gregorian calendar for historical dates became increasingly common in Japan, the traditional Japanese system demands that dates be written in reference to era names. The apparent problem introduced by the lack of era names was resolved by identifying the years of an imperial reign as a period.

Although in modern Japan posthumous imperial names correspond with the eras of their reign, this is a relatively recent practice, introduced during the Meiji period and instituted by law in 1979. Therefore, the posthumous names of the emperors and empresses who reigned prior to 1868 may not be taken as era names by themselves. For example, the year 572—the year in which Emperor Bidatsu assumed the Chrysanthemum Throne – is properly written as "敏達天皇元年" (Bidatsu-Tennō Gannen, "the first year of Emperor Bidatsu"), and not "敏達元年" (Bidatsu Gannen, "the first year of Bidatsu"), although it may be abbreviated as such. By incorporating both proper era names and posthumous imperial names in this manner, it is possible to extend the nengō system to cover all dates from 660 BCE through today.

== Unofficial era name system ==
In addition to the official era name system, in which the era names are selected by the imperial court, one also observes—primarily in the ancient documents and epigraphs of shrines and temples—unofficial era names called shinengō (私年号; "personal era name"), also known as ginengō (偽年号) or inengō (異年号). Currently, there are over 40 confirmed shinengō, most of them dating from the Middle Ages. Shinengō used prior to the reestablishment of the era name system in 701 are usually called itsunengō (逸年号). (Note: A list of shinengō and more information can be seen in the Japanese language entry on 私年号.)

Because official records of shinengō are lacking, the range of dates to which they apply is often unclear. For example, the well-known itsunengō Hakuhō (白鳳) is normally said to refer to 650–654 CE; a poetic synonym for the Hakuchi era. However, alternate interpretations exist. For example, in the Nichūreki, Hakuhō refers to 661–683 CE, and in some medieval temple documents, Hakuhō refers to 672–685 CE. Thus, shinengō may be used as an alternative way of dating periods for which there is no official era name.

Other well-known itsunengō and shinengō include Hōkō (法興) (591–621+ CE), Suzaku (朱雀) (686), Entoku (延徳) (1460), Miroku (弥勒) (1506–1507 or 1507–1509) and Meiroku (命禄) (1540–1543).

The most recent shinengō is Seiro (征露) (1904–1905), named for the Russo-Japanese War.

=== Kyūshū nengō ===
Edo period scholar Tsurumine Shigenobu proposed that Kyūshū nengō (九州年号), said to have been used in ancient Kumaso, should also be considered a form of shinengō. This claim is not generally recognized by the academic community. Lists of the proposed Kyūshū nengō can be seen in the Japanese language entries 鶴峯戊申 and 九州王朝説.

== Software support ==
=== Character sets ===
Certain era names have specific characters assigned to them, for instance ㋿ for the Reiwa period, which can also be written as 令和. These are included in Unicode: Code points U+32FF (㋿), U+337B (㍻), U+337C (㍼), U+337D (㍽) and U+337E (㍾) are used for the Reiwa, Heisei, Shōwa, Taishō and Meiji eras, respectively.

=== Calendar libraries ===
Certain calendar libraries support the conversion from and to the era system, as well as rendering of dates using it.

Since the release of Java 8, the Japanese calendar is supported in the new Date and time API for the year Meiji 6 (1873) onwards.

=== Support for the new era in Japanese imperial transition of 2019 ===
Computers and software manufacturers needed to test their systems in preparation for the new era which began on 1 May 2019. Windows provided a test mechanism to simulate a new era ahead of time. Java Development Kit 11 supported this era using the placeholders "元号" for Japanese, "NewEra" for other languages. The final name was added in JDK 12.0.1, after it was announced by the Japanese government.

Unicode code point U+32FF (㋿) was reserved for representing the new era name, Reiwa.

== List of Japanese era names ==
The list of Japanese era names is the result of a periodization system which was established by Emperor Kōtoku in 645. The system of Japanese era names (年号, nengō; "year name") was irregular until the beginning of the 8th century. After 701, sequential era names developed without interruption across a span of centuries. As of 1 April 2019, there have been 239 era names.

To convert a Japanese year to a Gregorian calendar year, find the first year of the Japanese era name (also called nengō). When found, add the number of the Japanese year, then subtract 1.

=== Asuka period ===
Era name	Period of use	Length of use	Derived from	Remark
Emperor Kōtoku 孝徳天皇 (r. 645–654 CE)
Taika 大化	645–650 CE	5 years	Book of Documents, Book of Han, Book of Song	
Hakuchi 白雉	650–654 CE	4 years	Book of Han	
Emperor Tenmu 天武天皇 (r. 673–686 CE)
Shuchō 朱鳥	686 CE	3 months	Book of Rites	Also rendered as Suchō, Akamitori, and Akamidori.
Emperor Monmu 文武天皇 (r. 697–707 CE)
Taihō 大宝	701–704 CE	3 years	Classic of Changes	Also rendered as Daihō.
Keiun 慶雲	704–708 CE	4 years	Selections of Refined Literature, Book of Jin	Also rendered as Kyōun. Usage continued by the Empress Genmei upon her ascension to the throne.
Empress Genmei 元明天皇 (r. 707–715 CE)
Wadō 和銅	708–715 CE	9 years		

=== Nara period ===
Era name	Period of use	Length of use	Derived from	Remark
Empress Genshō 元正天皇 (r. 715–724 CE)
Reiki 霊亀	715–717 CE	3 years	Classic of Changes	
Yōrō 養老	717–724 CE	8 years	Book of Rites	
Emperor Shōmu 聖武天皇 (r. 724–749 CE)
Jinki 神亀	724–729 CE	6 years	Book of Rites with Commentaries of Dai De (大戴禮記), The Literary Expositor	
Tenpyō 天平	729–749 CE	21 years	Classic of Changes, Great Learning	Also rendered as Tenbyō and Tenhei.
Tenpyō-kanpō 天平感宝	749 CE	4 months		Also rendered as Tenbyō-kanpō and Tenhei-kanpō.
Empress Kōken 孝謙天皇 (r. 749–758 CE; first reign)
Tenpyō-shōhō 天平勝宝	749–757 CE	9 years		Also rendered as Tenbyō-shōhō and Tenpei-shōhō.
Tenpyō-hōji 天平宝字	757–765 CE	9 years		Also rendered as Tenbyō-hōji and Tenpei-hōji. Usage continued by the Emperor Junnin and the Empress Shōtoku upon their ascension to the throne.
Empress Shōtoku 称徳天皇 (r. 764–770 CE; second reign)
Tenpyō-jingo 天平神護	765–767 CE	3 years		Also rendered as Tenbyō-jingo and Tenhei-jingo.
Jingo-keiun 神護景雲	767–770 CE	4 years		Usage continued by the Emperor Kōnin upon his ascension to the throne.
Emperor Kōnin 光仁天皇 (r. 770–781 CE)
Hōki 宝亀	770–781 CE	12 years	Book of Rites	
Emperor Kanmu 桓武天皇 (r. 781–806 CE)
Ten'ō 天応	781–782 CE	2 years	Classic of Changes	
Enryaku 延暦	782–806 CE	25 years	Book of Later Han	Usage continued by the Emperor Heizei upon his ascension to the throne.

=== Heian period ===
Era name	Period of use	Length of use	Derived from	Remark
Emperor Heizei 平城天皇 (r. 806–809 CE)
Daidō 大同	806–810 CE	5 years	Book of Rites	Usage continued by the Emperor Saga upon his ascension to the throne.
Emperor Saga 嵯峨天皇 (r. 809–823 CE)
Kōnin 弘仁	810–824 CE	15 years		Usage continued by the Emperor Junna upon his ascension to the throne.
Emperor Junna 淳和天皇 (r. 823–833 CE)
Tenchō 天長	824–834 CE	11 years		Usage continued by the Emperor Ninmyō upon his ascension to the throne.
Emperor Ninmyō 仁明天皇 (r. 833–850 CE)
Jōwa 承和	834–848 CE	15 years		Also rendered as Shōwa and Sōwa.
Kashō 嘉祥	848–851 CE	4 years		Also rendered as Kajō. Usage continued by the Emperor Montoku upon his ascension to the throne.
Emperor Montoku 文徳天皇 (r. 850–858 CE)
Ninju 仁寿	851–854 CE	4 years		
Saikō 斉衡	854–857 CE	4 years		
Ten'an 天安	857–859 CE	3 years		Also rendered as Tennan. Usage continued by the Emperor Seiwa upon his ascension to the throne.
Emperor Seiwa 清和天皇 (r. 858–876 CE)
Jōgan 貞観	859–877 CE	19 years	Classic of Changes	Usage continued by the Emperor Yōzei upon his ascension to the throne.
Emperor Yōzei 陽成天皇 (r. 876–884 CE)
Gangyō 元慶	877–885 CE	9 years		Also rendered as Gankyō and Genkei. Usage continued by the Emperor Kōkō upon his ascension to the throne.
Emperor Kōkō 光孝天皇 (r. 884–887 CE)
Ninna 仁和	885–889 CE	5 years		Also rendered as Ninwa. Usage continued by the Emperor Uda upon his ascension to the throne.
Emperor Uda 宇多天皇 (r. 887–897 CE)
Kanpyō 寛平	889–898 CE	10 years		Also rendered as Kanpei, Kanbyō, Kanbei, and Kanhei. Usage continued by the Emperor Daigo upon his ascension to the throne.
Emperor Daigo 醍醐天皇 (r. 897–930 CE)
Shōtai 昌泰	898–901 CE	4 years		
Engi 延喜	901–923 CE	23 years	Book of Documents	
Enchō 延長	923–931 CE	9 years	Selections of Refined Literature	Usage continued by the Emperor Suzaku upon his ascension to the throne.
Emperor Suzaku 朱雀天皇 (r. 930–946 CE)
Jōhei 承平	931–938 CE	8 years	Book of Han	Also rendered as Shōhei.
Tengyō 天慶	938–947 CE	10 years	Book of Han	Also rendered as Tenkei and Tenkyō. Usage continued by the Emperor Murakami upon his ascension to the throne.
Emperor Murakami 村上天皇 (r. 946–967 CE)
Tenryaku 天暦	947–957 CE	11 years	Analects	Also rendered as Tenreki.
Tentoku 天徳	957–961 CE	5 years	Classic of Changes	
Ōwa 応和	961–964 CE	4 years	Book of Jin	
Kōhō 康保	964–968 CE	5 years	Book of Documents	Usage continued by the Emperor Reizei upon his ascension to the throne.
Emperor Reizei 冷泉天皇 (r. 967–969 CE)
Anna 安和	968–970 CE	3 years	Book of Rites	Also rendered as Anwa. Usage continued by the Emperor En'yū upon his ascension to the throne.
Emperor En'yū 円融天皇 (r. 969–984 CE)
Tenroku 天禄	970–974 CE	5 years		
Ten'en 天延	974–976 CE	3 years		
Jōgen 貞元	976–978 CE	3 years		Also rendered as Teigen.
Tengen 天元	978–983 CE	6 years		
Eikan 永観	983–985 CE	3 years	Book of Documents	Also rendered as Yōkan. Usage continued by the Emperor Kazan upon his ascension to the throne.
Emperor Kazan 花山天皇 (r. 984–986 CE)
Kanna 寛和	985–987 CE	3 years		Also rendered as Kanwa. Usage continued by the Emperor Ichijō upon his ascension to the throne.
Emperor Ichijō 一条天皇 (r. 986–1011 CE)
Eien 永延	987–989 CE	3 years	Book of Han, Book of Later Han	Also rendered as Yōen.
Eiso 永祚	989–990 CE	2 years	Book of Jin, Old Book of Tang	Also rendered as Yōso.
Shōryaku 正暦	990–995 CE	6 years		Also rendered as Jōryaku and Shōreki.
Chōtoku 長徳	995–999 CE	5 years	Admonishment by the Colonel of the City Gates (城門校尉箴)	Also rendered as Jōryaku and Shōreki.
Chōhō 長保	999–1004 CE	6 years	Discourses of the States	
Kankō 寛弘	1004–1012 CE	9 years	Book of Han	Usage continued by the Emperor Sanjō upon his ascension to the throne.
Emperor Sanjō 三条天皇 (r. 1011–1016 CE)
Chōwa 長和	1012–1017 CE	6 years	Book of Rites	Usage continued by the Emperor Go-Ichijō upon his ascension to the throne.
Emperor Go-Ichijō 後一条天皇 (r. 1016–1036 CE)
Kannin 寛仁	1017–1021 CE	5 years	Records of Kuaiji (會稽記)	
Jian 治安	1021–1024 CE	4 years	Book of Han	Also rendered as Chian.
Manju 万寿	1024–1028 CE	5 years	Classic of Poetry	
Chōgen 長元	1028–1037 CE	10 years	Six Secret Teachings	Usage continued by the Emperor Go-Suzaku upon his ascension to the throne.
Emperor Go-Suzaku 後朱雀天皇 (r. 1036–1045 CE)
Chōryaku 長暦	1037–1040 CE	4 years	Spring and Autumn Annals, Book of Jin	Also rendered as Chōreki.
Chōkyū 長久	1040–1044 CE	5 years	Book of the Way and of Virtue	
Kantoku 寛徳	1044–1046 CE	3 years	Book of Later Han	Usage continued by the Emperor Go-Reizei upon his ascension to the throne.
Emperor Go-Reizei 後冷泉天皇 (r. 1045–1068 CE)
Eishō 永承	1046–1053 CE	8 years	Book of Documents, Book of Jin, Book of Song	Also rendered as Eijō and Yōjō.
Tengi 天喜	1053–1058 CE	6 years	Book of the Master Who Embraces Simplicity	Also rendered as Tenki.
Kōhei 康平	1058–1065 CE	8 years	Book of Later Han	
Jiryaku 治暦	1065–1069 CE	5 years	Correct Interpretation of the Book of Documents (尚書正義)	Also rendered as Chiryaku. Usage continued by the Emperor Go-Sanjō upon his ascension to the throne.
Emperor Go-Sanjō 後三条天皇 (r. 1068–1073 CE)
Enkyū 延久	1069–1074 CE	6 years	Book of Documents	Usage continued by the Emperor Shirakawa upon his ascension to the throne.
Emperor Shirakawa 白河天皇 (r. 1073–1087 CE)
Jōhō 承保	1074–1077 CE	4 years	Book of Documents	Also rendered as Shōhō and Shōho.
Jōryaku 承暦	1077–1081 CE	5 years	Weicheng Dianxun (維城典訓)	Also rendered as Shōryaku and Shōreki.
Eihō 永保	1081–1084 CE	4 years	Book of Documents	Also rendered as Yōhō.
Ōtoku 応徳	1084–1087 CE	4 years	Comprehensive Meaning of White Tiger Pavilion	Usage continued by the Emperor Horikawa upon his ascension to the throne.
Emperor Horikawa 堀河天皇 (r. 1087–1107 CE)
Kanji 寛治	1087–1094 CE	8 years	Book of Rites	
Kahō 嘉保	1094–1096 CE	3 years	Records of the Grand Historian	
Eichō 永長	1096–1097 CE	2 years	Book of Later Han	Also rendered as Yōchō.
Jōtoku 承徳	1097–1099 CE	3 years	Classic of Changes	Also rendered as Shōtoku.
Kōwa 康和	1099–1104 CE	6 years	Theories of Politics (政論)	
Chōji 長治	1104–1106 CE	3 years	Book of Han	
Kajō 嘉承	1106–1108 CE	3 years	Book of Han	Usage continued by the Emperor Toba upon his ascension to the throne.
Emperor Toba 鳥羽天皇 (r. 1107–1123 CE)
Tennin 天仁	1108–1110 CE	3 years	Selections of Refined Literature	
Ten'ei 天永	1110–1113 CE	4 years	Book of Documents	Also rendered as Ten'yō.
Eikyū 永久	1113–1118 CE	6 years	Mao Commentary	Also rendered as Yōkyū.
Gen'ei 元永	1118–1120 CE	3 years		Also rendered as Gen'yō.
Hōan 保安	1120–1124 CE	5 years		Usage continued by the Emperor Sutoku upon his ascension to the throne.
Emperor Sutoku 崇徳天皇 (r. 1123–1142 CE)
Tenji 天治	1124–1126 CE	3 years	Classic of Changes	Also rendered as Tenchi.
Daiji 大治	1126–1131 CE	6 years	Hetu Tingzuofu (河圖挺佐輔)	Also rendered as Taiji.
Tenshō 天承	1131–1132 CE	2 years	Book of Han	Also rendered as Tenjō.
Chōshō 長承	1132–1135 CE	4 years	Records of the Grand Historian	Also rendered as Chōjō.
Hōen 保延	1135–1141 CE	7 years	Selections of Refined Literature	
Eiji 永治	1141–1142 CE	2 years	On the Standards for Literature (典論), Book of Jin	Usage continued by the Emperor Konoe upon his ascension to the throne.
Emperor Konoe 近衛天皇 (r. 1142–1155 CE)
Kōji 康治	1142–1144 CE	3 years	Book of Song	
Ten'yō 天養	1144–1145 CE	2 years	Book of Later Han	Also rendered as Tennyō.
Kyūan 久安	1145–1151 CE	7 years	Book of Jin	
Ninpei 仁平	1151–1154 CE	4 years	Book of Later Han	Also rendered as Ninpyō, Ninbyō, Ninhyō, and Ninhei.
Kyūju 久寿	1154–1156 CE	3 years	Book of the Master Who Embraces Simplicity	Usage continued by the Emperor Go-Shirakawa upon his ascension to the throne.
Emperor Go-Shirakawa 後白河天皇 (r. 1155–1158 CE)
Hōgen 保元	1156–1159 CE	4 years	Instructions for the Yan Clan (顏氏家訓)	Also rendered as Hogen. Usage continued by the Emperor Nijō upon his ascension to the throne.
Emperor Nijō 二条天皇 (r. 1158–1165 CE)
Heiji 平治	1159–1160 CE	2 years	Records of the Grand Historian	Also rendered as Byōji.
Eiryaku 永暦	1160–1161 CE	2 years	Book of Later Han	Also rendered as Yōryaku.
Ōhō 応保	1161–1163 CE	3 years	Book of Documents	Also rendered as Ōpō.
Chōkan 長寛	1163–1165 CE	3 years	Weicheng Dianxun (維城典訓)	Also rendered as Chōgan.
Eiman 永万	1165–1166 CE	2 years	Book of Han	Also rendered as Yōman. Usage continued by the Emperor Rokujō upon his ascension to the throne.
Emperor Rokujō 六条天皇 (r. 1165–1168 CE)
Nin'an 仁安	1166–1169 CE	4 years	Correct Interpretation of the Mao Commentary (毛詩正義)	Also rendered as Ninnan. Usage continued by the Emperor Takakura upon his ascension to the throne.
Emperor Takakura 高倉天皇 (r. 1168–1180 CE)
Kaō 嘉応	1169–1171 CE	3 years	Book of Han	
Jōan 承安	1171–1175 CE	5 years	Book of Documents	Also rendered as Shōan.
Angen 安元	1175–1177 CE	3 years	Book of Han	
Jishō 治承	1177–1181 CE	5 years	Hetu Tingzuofu (河圖挺作輔)	Also rendered as Jijō and Chishō. Usage continued by the Emperor Antoku upon his ascension to the throne.
Emperor Antoku 安徳天皇 (r. 1180–1185 CE)
Yōwa 養和	1181–1182 CE	2 years	Book of Later Han	
Juei 寿永	1182–1185 CE	4 years	Classic of Poetry	Also used by the Emperor Go-Toba from 1183 CE to 1184 CE.
Emperor Go-Toba 後鳥羽天皇 (r. 1183–1198 CE)
Juei 寿永	1183–1184 CE	2 years	Classic of Poetry	Also used by the Emperor Antoku from 1182 to 1185 CE.
Genryaku 元暦	1184–1185 CE	2 years	Shangshu Kaolingyao (尚書考靈耀)	

=== Kamakura period ===
Era name	Period of use	Length of use	Derived from	Remark
Emperor Go-Toba 後鳥羽天皇 (r. 1183–1198 CE)
Bunji 文治	1185–1190 CE	6 years	Book of Rites	Also rendered as Monchi.
Kenkyū 建久	1190–1199 CE	10 years	Book of Jin	Usage continued by the Emperor Tsuchimikado upon his ascension to the throne.
Emperor Tsuchimikado 土御門天皇 (r. 1198–1210 CE)
Shōji 正治	1199–1201 CE	3 years	Zhuangzi	Also rendered as Shōchi.
Kennin 建仁	1201–1204 CE	4 years	Selections of Refined Literature	
Genkyū 元久	1204–1206 CE	3 years	Correct Interpretation of the Mao Commentary (毛詩正義)	
Ken'ei 建永	1206–1207 CE	2 years	Selections of Refined Literature	Also rendered as Ken'yō.
Jōgen 承元	1207–1211 CE	5 years	Comprehensive Institutions	Also rendered as Shōgen. Usage continued by the Emperor Juntoku upon his ascension to the throne.
Emperor Juntoku 順徳天皇 (r. 1210–1221 CE)
Kenryaku 建暦	1211–1213 CE	3 years	Book of Later Han	Also rendered as Kenreki.
Kempo 建保	1213–1219 CE	7 years	Book of Documents	Also rendered as Kenhō.
Jōkyū 承久	1219–1222 CE	4 years	Apocrypha of the Classic of Poetry (詩緯)	Also rendered as Shōkyū. Usage continued by the Emperor Chūkyō and the Emperor Go-Horikawa upon their ascension to the throne.
Emperor Go-Horikawa 後堀河天皇 (r. 1221–1232 CE)
Jōō 貞応	1222–1224 CE	3 years	Classic of Changes	Also rendered as Teiō.
Gennin 元仁	1224–1225 CE	2 years	Classic of Changes	
Karoku 嘉禄	1225–1227 CE	3 years	Records of Diverse Matters	
Antei 安貞	1227–1229 CE	3 years	Classic of Changes	Also rendered as Anjō.
Kangi 寛喜	1229–1232 CE	4 years	Book of Wei	Also rendered as Kanki.
Jōei 貞永	1232–1233 CE	2 years	Classic of Changes	Also rendered as Teiei. Usage continued by the Emperor Shijō upon his ascension to the throne.
Emperor Shijō 四条天皇 (r. 1232–1242 CE)
Tenpuku 天福	1233–1234 CE	2 years	Book of Documents	Also rendered as Tenfuku.
Bunryaku 文暦	1234–1235 CE	2 years	Selections of Refined Literature	Also rendered as Monryaku and Monreki.
Katei 嘉禎	1235–1238 CE	4 years	Book of Northern Qi	
Ryakunin 暦仁	1238–1239 CE	2 years	Book of Sui	Also rendered as Rekinin.
En'ō 延応	1239–1240 CE	2 years	Selections of Refined Literature	Also rendered as Ennō.
Ninji 仁治	1240–1243 CE	4 years	New Book of Tang	Also rendered as Ninchi. Usage continued by the Emperor Go-Saga upon his ascension to the throne.
Emperor Go-Saga 後嵯峨天皇 (r. 1242–1246 CE)
Kangen 寛元	1243–1247 CE	5 years	Book of Song	Usage continued by the Emperor Go-Fukakusa upon his ascension to the throne.
Emperor Go-Fukakusa 後深草天皇 (r. 1246–1260 CE)
Hōji 宝治	1247–1249 CE	3 years	Luxuriant Dew of the Spring and Autumn Annals	
Kenchō 建長	1249–1256 CE	8 years	Book of Later Han	
Kōgen 康元	1256–1257 CE	2 years		
Shōka 正嘉	1257–1259 CE	3 years	Classified Collection Based on the Classics and Other Literature	
Shōgen 正元	1259–1260 CE	2 years	Apocrypha of the Classic of Poetry (詩緯)	Usage continued by the Emperor Kameyama upon his ascension to the throne.
Emperor Kameyama 亀山天皇 (r. 1260–1274 CE)
Bun'ō 文応	1260–1261 CE	2 years	Book of Jin	Also rendered as Bunnō.
Kōchō 弘長	1261–1264 CE	4 years	The Political Program of the Zhenguan Period (貞觀政要)	
Bun'ei 文永	1264–1275 CE	12 years	Book of Later Han	Usage continued by the Emperor Go-Uda upon his ascension to the throne.
Emperor Go-Uda 後宇多天皇 (r. 1274–1287 CE)
Kenji 建治	1275–1278 CE	4 years	Rites of Zhou	
Kōan 弘安	1278–1288 CE	11 years	Veritable Records of the Emperor Taizong of Tang (唐太宗實錄)	Usage continued by the Emperor Fushimi upon his ascension to the throne.
Emperor Fushimi 伏見天皇 (r. 1287–1298 CE)
Shōō 正応	1288–1293 CE	6 years	Notes on the Mao Commentary (毛詩注)	
Einin 永仁	1293–1299 CE	7 years	Book of Jin	Usage continued by the Emperor Go-Fushimi upon his ascension to the throne.
Emperor Go-Fushimi 後伏見天皇 (r. 1298–1301 CE)
Shōan 正安	1299–1302 CE	4 years	The School Sayings of Confucius	Usage continued by the Emperor Go-Nijō upon his ascension to the throne.
Emperor Go-Nijō 後二条天皇 (r. 1301–1308 CE)
Kengen 乾元	1302–1303 CE	2 years	Classic of Changes	
Kagen 嘉元	1303–1306 CE	4 years	Classified Collection Based on the Classics and Other Literature	
Tokuji 徳治	1306–1308 CE	3 years	The Commentary of Zuo	Usage continued by the Emperor Hanazono upon his ascension to the throne.
Emperor Hanazono 花園天皇 (r. 1308–1318 CE)
Enkyō 延慶	1308–1311 CE	4 years	Book of Later Han	Also rendered as Engyō and Enkei.
Ōchō 応長	1311–1312 CE	2 years	Old Book of Tang	
Shōwa 正和	1312–1317 CE	6 years	Old Book of Tang	
Bunpō 文保	1317–1319 CE	3 years	Book of Liang	Also rendered as Bunhō. Usage continued by the Emperor Go-Daigo upon his ascension to the throne.
Emperor Go-Daigo 後醍醐天皇 (r. 1318–1339 CE)
Gen'ō 元応	1319–1321 CE	3 years	Old Book of Tang	Also rendered as Gennō.
Genkō 元亨	1321–1324 CE	4 years	Classic of Changes	
Shōchū 正中	1324–1326 CE	3 years	Classic of Changes	
Karyaku 嘉暦	1326–1329 CE	4 years	Old Book of Tang	
Gentoku 元徳	1329–1332 CE	4 years	Classic of Changes, Correct Interpretation of the Classic of Changes (周易正義)	
Genkō 元弘	1331–1334 CE	4 years	Classified Collection Based on the Classics and Other Literature	

=== Nanboku-chō period ===
==== Southern Court ====
Era name	Period of use	Length of use	Derived from	Remark
Emperor Go-Daigo 後醍醐天皇 (r. 1318–1339 CE)
Kenmu 建武	1334–1336 CE	3 years	Book of Later Han	Also rendered as Kenbu. Also used by the Emperor Kōmyō from 1336 CE to 1338 CE.
Engen 延元	1336–1340 CE	5 years	Book of Liang	Usage continued by the Emperor Go-Murakami upon his ascension to the throne.
Emperor Go-Murakami 後村上天皇 (r. 1339–1368 CE)
Kōkoku 興国	1340–1347 CE	8 years	The Commentary of Zuo, Selections of Refined Literature, New History of the Five Dynasties	
Shōhei 正平	1347–1370 CE	24 years	Book of Song	Usage continued by the Emperor Chōkei upon his ascension to the throne.
Emperor Chōkei 長慶天皇 (r. 1368–1383 CE)
Kentoku 建徳	1370–1372 CE	3 years	Selections of Refined Literature	
Bunchū 文中	1372–1375 CE	4 years	Classic of Changes	
Tenju 天授	1375–1381 CE	7 years	Records of the Grand Historian	
Kōwa 弘和	1381–1384 CE	4 years	Book of Documents	Usage continued by the Emperor Go-Kameyama upon his ascension to the throne.
Emperor Go-Kameyama 後亀山天皇 (r. 1383–1392 CE)
Genchū 元中	1384–1392 CE	9 years	Classic of Changes	Genchū 9 was superseded by Meitoku 3 in 1392 CE.

==== Northern Court ====
Era name	Period of use	Length of use	Derived from	Remark
Emperor Kōgon 光厳天皇 (r. 1331–1333 CE)
Shōkyō 正慶	1332–1333 CE	2 years	Correct Interpretation of the Classic of Changes (周易正義)	Also rendered as Shōkyō.
Emperor Kōmyō 光明天皇 (r. 1336–1348 CE)
Kenmu 建武	1336–1338 CE	3 years	Book of Later Han	Also rendered as Kenbu. Also used by the Emperor Go-Daigo from 1334 CE to 1336 CE.
Ryakuō 暦応	1338–1342 CE	5 years	Records of Emperors and Kings (帝王世紀)	Also rendered as Rekiō.
Kōei 康永	1342–1345 CE	4 years	Book of Han	
Jōwa 貞和	1345–1350 CE	6 years	Classified Collection Based on the Classics and Other Literature	Also rendered as Teiwa. Usage continued by the Emperor Sukō upon his ascension to the throne.
Emperor Sukō 崇光天皇 (r. 1348–1351 CE)
Kannō 観応	1350–1352 CE	3 years	Zhuangzi	Also rendered as Kan'ō. Usage continued by the Emperor Go-Kōgon upon his ascension to the throne.
Emperor Go-Kōgon 後光厳天皇 (r. 1352–1371 CE)
Bunna 文和	1352–1356 CE	5 years	Records of the Three Kingdoms, Old Book of Tang	Also rendered as Bunwa.
Enbun 延文	1356–1361 CE	6 years	Book of Han	
Kōan 康安	1361–1362 CE	2 years	Correct Interpretation of the Records of the Grand Historian (史記正義), Old Book of Tang	
Jōji 貞治	1362–1368 CE	7 years	Classic of Changes	Also rendered as Teiji.
Ōan 応安	1368–1375 CE	8 years	Correct Interpretation of the Mao Commentary (毛詩正義)	Usage continued by the Emperor Go-En'yū upon his ascension to the throne.
Emperor Go-En'yū 後円融天皇 (r. 1371–1382 CE)
Eiwa 永和	1375–1379 CE	5 years	Book of Documents, Classified Collection Based on the Classics and Other Literature	
Kōryaku 康暦	1379–1381 CE	3 years	Old Book of Tang	
Eitoku 永徳	1381–1384 CE	4 years	The Governing Principles of Ancient China (羣書治要)	Usage continued by the Emperor Go-Komatsu upon his ascension to the throne.
Emperor Go-Komatsu 後小松天皇 (r. 1382–1412 CE)
Shitoku 至徳	1384–1387 CE	4 years	Classic of Filial Piety	Also rendered as Meitoku
Kakei 嘉慶	1387–1389 CE	3 years	Correct Interpretation of the Mao Commentary (毛詩正義)	Also rendered as Kakyō.
Kōō 康応	1389–1390 CE	2 years	Selections of Refined Literature	
Meitoku 明徳	1390–1394 CE	5 years	Book of Rites	Meitoku 3 superseded Genchū 9 in 1392 CE.

=== Muromachi period ===
Era name	Period of use	Length of use	Derived from	Remark
Emperor Go-Komatsu 後小松天皇 (r. 1382–1412 CE)
Ōei 応永	1394–1428 CE	35 years	Institutional History of Tang	Usage continued by the Emperor Shōkō upon his ascension to the throne.
Emperor Shōkō 称光天皇 (r. 1412–1428 CE)
Shōchō 正長	1428–1429 CE	2 years	Correct Interpretation of the Book of Rites (禮記正義)	Usage continued by the Emperor Go-Hanazono upon his ascension to the throne.
Emperor Go-Hanazono 後花園天皇 (r. 1428–1464 CE)
Eikyō 永享	1429–1441 CE	13 years	Book of Later Han	Also rendered as Eikō.
Kakitsu 嘉吉	1441–1444 CE	4 years	Classic of Changes	Also rendered as Kakichi.
Bun'an 文安	1444–1449 CE	6 years	Book of Documents, Book of Jin	Also rendered as Bunnan.
Hōtoku 宝徳	1449–1452 CE	4 years	Old Book of Tang	
Kyōtoku 享徳	1452–1455 CE	4 years	Book of Documents	
Kōshō 康正	1455–1457 CE	3 years	Book of Documents, Records of the Grand Historian	
Chōroku 長禄	1457–1460 CE	4 years	Han Feizi	
Kanshō 寛正	1460–1466 CE	7 years	The School Sayings of Confucius	Usage continued by the Emperor Go-Tsuchimikado upon his ascension to the throne.
Emperor Go-Tsuchimikado 後土御門天皇 (r. 1464–1500 CE)
Bunshō 文正	1466–1467 CE	2 years	Xunzi	Also rendered as Monshō.
Ōnin 応仁	1467–1469 CE	3 years	Weicheng Dianxun (維城典訓)	
Bunmei 文明	1469–1487 CE	19 years	Classic of Changes	
Chōkyō 長享	1487–1489 CE	3 years	Selections of Refined Literature, The Commentary of Zuo, Book of Later Han	
Entoku 延徳	1489–1492 CE	4 years	Mencius	
Meiō 明応	1492–1501 CE	10 years	Classic of Changes	Usage continued by the Emperor Go-Kashiwabara upon his ascension to the throne.
Emperor Go-Kashiwabara 後柏原天皇 (r. 1500–1526 CE)
Bunki 文亀	1501–1504 CE	4 years	The Literary Expositor	
Eishō 永正	1504–1521 CE	18 years	Apocrypha of the Classic of Changes (周易緯)	
Daiei 大永	1521–1528 CE	8 years	Comprehensive Institutions	Usage continued by the Emperor Go-Nara upon his ascension to the throne.
Emperor Go-Nara 後奈良天皇 (r. 1526–1557 CE)
Kyōroku 享禄	1528–1532 CE	5 years	Classic of Changes	
Tenbun 天文	1532–1555 CE	24 years	Classic of Changes	Also rendered as Tenmon.
Kōji 弘治	1555–1558 CE	4 years	Book of Northern Qi	Usage continued by the Emperor Ōgimachi upon his ascension to the throne.
Emperor Ōgimachi 正親町天皇 (r. 1557–1586 CE)
Eiroku 永禄	1558–1570 CE	13 years	The Governing Principles of Ancient China (羣書治要)	Also rendered as Yōroku.
Genki 元亀	1570–1573 CE	4 years	Mao Commentary, Selections of Refined Literature	

=== Azuchi–Momoyama period ===
Era name	Period of use	Length of use	Derived from	Remark
Emperor Ōgimachi 正親町天皇 (r. 1557–1586 CE)
Tenshō 天正	1573–1592 CE	20 years	Selections of Refined Literature, Book of the Way and of Virtue	Usage continued by the Emperor Go-Yōzei upon his ascension to the throne.
Emperor Go-Yōzei 後陽成天皇 (r. 1586–1611 CE)
Bunroku 文禄	1592–1596 CE	5 years	Comprehensive Institutions	
Keichō 慶長	1596–1615 CE	20 years	Correct Interpretation of the Mao Commentary (毛詩注疏)	Also rendered as Kyōchō. Usage continued by the Emperor Go-Mizunoo upon his ascension to the throne.

=== Edo period ===
Era name	Period of use	Length of use	Derived from	Remark
Emperor Go-Mizunoo 後水尾天皇 (r. 1611–1629 CE)
Genna 元和	1615–1624 CE	10 years	Era name of the Emperor Xianzong of Tang	Also rendered as Genwa.
Kan'ei 寛永	1624–1644 CE	21 years	Collected Commentaries on the Classic of Poetry (詩集傳)	Usage continued by the Empress Meishō and the Emperor Go-Kōmyō upon their ascension to the throne.
Emperor Go-Kōmyō 後光明天皇 (r. 1643–1654 CE)
Shōhō 正保	1645–1648 CE	4 years	Book of Documents	
Keian 慶安	1648–1652 CE	5 years	Classic of Changes	Also rendered as Kyōan.
Jōō 承応	1652–1655 CE	4 years	Book of Jin	Also rendered as Shōō. Usage continued by the Emperor Go-Sai upon his ascension to the throne.
Emperor Go-Sai 後西天皇 (r. 1655–1663 CE)
Meireki 明暦	1655–1658 CE	4 years	Book of Han, Book of Later Han	Also rendered as Myōryaku and Meiryaku.
Manji 万治	1658–1661 CE	4 years	Records of the Grand Historian, The Political Program of the Zhenguan Period (貞觀政要)	Also rendered as Manchi.
Kanbun 寛文	1661–1673 CE	13 years	Xunzi	Usage continued by the Emperor Reigen upon his ascension to the throne.
Emperor Reigen 霊元天皇 (r. 1663–1687 CE)
Enpō 延宝	1673–1681 CE	9 years	Book of Sui	Also rendered as Enhō. Formerly written as "延寳" in kanji.
Tenna 天和	1681–1684 CE	4 years	Book of Documents, Book of Han, Book of Later Han, Zhuangzi	Also rendered as Tenwa.
Jōkyō 貞享	1684–1688 CE	5 years	Classic of Changes	Usage continued by the Emperor Higashiyama upon his ascension to the throne.
Emperor Higashiyama 東山天皇 (r. 1687–1709 CE)
Genroku 元禄	1688–1704 CE	16 years	Selections of Refined Literature	
Hōei 宝永	1704–1711 CE	8 years	Old Book of Tang	Usage continued by the Emperor Nakamikado upon his ascension to the throne.
Emperor Nakamikado 中御門天皇 (r. 1709–1735 CE)
Shōtoku 正徳	1711–1716 CE	6 years	Book of Documents	
Kyōhō 享保	1716–1736 CE	21 years	Book of Zhou	Usage continued by the Emperor Sakuramachi upon his ascension to the throne.
Emperor Sakuramachi 桜町天皇 (r. 1735–1747 CE)
Genbun 元文	1736–1741 CE	6 years	Selections of Refined Literature	
Kanpō 寛保	1741–1744 CE	4 years	Discourses of the States	Also rendered as Kanhō.
Enkyō 延享	1744–1748 CE	5 years	Classified Collection Based on the Classics and Other Literature	Usage continued by the Emperor Momozono upon his ascension to the throne.
Emperor Momozono 桃園天皇 (r. 1747–1762 CE)
Kan'en 寛延	1748–1751 CE	4 years	Selections of Refined Literature	
Hōreki 宝暦	1751–1764 CE	14 years	The Political Program of the Zhenguan Period (貞觀政要)	Also rendered as Hōryaku. Usage continued by the Empress Go-Sakuramachi upon her ascension to the throne.
Empress Go-Sakuramachi 後桜町天皇 (r. 1762–1771 CE)
Meiwa 明和	1764–1772 CE	9 years	Book of Documents	Also rendered as Myōwa. Usage continued by the Emperor Go-Momozono upon his ascension to the throne.
Emperor Go-Momozono 後桃園天皇 (r. 1771–1779 CE)
An'ei 安永	1772–1781 CE	10 years	Selections of Refined Literature	Usage continued by the Emperor Kōkaku upon his ascension to the throne.
Emperor Kōkaku 光格天皇 (r. 1780–1817 CE)
Tenmei 天明	1781–1789 CE	9 years	Book of Documents	
Kansei 寛政	1789–1801 CE	13 years	The Commentary of Zuo	
Kyōwa 享和	1801–1804 CE	4 years	Selections of Refined Literature	
Bunka 文化	1804–1818 CE	15 years	Classic of Changes, Book of Later Han	Usage continued by the Emperor Ninkō upon his ascension to the throne.
Emperor Ninkō 仁孝天皇 (r. 1817–1846 CE)
Bunsei 文政	1818–1830 CE	13 years	Book of Documents	
Tenpō 天保	1830–1844 CE	15 years	Book of Documents	Also rendered as Tenhō.
Kōka 弘化	1844–1848 CE	5 years	Book of Documents	Usage continued by the Emperor Kōmei upon his ascension to the throne.
Emperor Kōmei 孝明天皇 (r. 1846–1867 CE)
Kaei 嘉永	1848–1854 CE	7 years	Book of Song	
Ansei 安政	1854–1860 CE	7 years	The Governing Principles of Ancient China (羣書治要)	
Man'en 万延	1860–1861 CE	2 years	Book of Later Han	
Bunkyū 文久	1861–1864 CE	4 years	Book of Later Han	
Genji 元治	1864–1865 CE	2 years	Classic of Changes, Records of the Three Kingdoms	
Keiō 慶応	1865–1868 CE	4 years	Selections of Refined Literature	Usage continued by the Emperor Meiji upon his ascension to the throne.

=== Modern Japan ===
The "one reign, one era name" (一世一元) system was implemented in 1868 CE.

Era name	Period of use	Length of use	Derived from	Remark
Emperor Meiji 明治天皇 (r. 1867–1912 CE)
Meiji 明治	1868–1912 CE	44 years, 186 days	Classic of Changes	In 1873, Japan adopted the Seireki (西暦), the Common Era calendar. Nowadays, Japanese people know it as well as the regnal eras. Prior to the introduction of the Gregorian calendar in 1873, the reference calendar was based on the lunisolar Chinese calendar.
Emperor Taishō 大正天皇 (r. 1912–1926 CE)
Taishō 大正	1912–1926 CE	14 years, 147 days	Classic of Changes	Rejected proposals were Tenkō (天興), Kōka (興化), Eian (永安), Kentoku (乾徳), Shōtoku (昭徳).
Emperor Shōwa 昭和天皇 (r. 1926–1989 CE)
Shōwa 昭和	1926–1989 CE	62 years, 14 days	Book of Documents	Rejected proposals were Jinka (神化), Genka (元化), Jinwa (神和), Dōwa (同和), Keimei (繼明), Junmei (順明), Meiho (明保), Kan'an (寛安), Gen'an (元安), Ryūsei (立成), Teigyō (定業), Kōbun (光文), Shōmei (章明), Kyōchū (協中).
Emperor Emeritus (Akihito） 明仁 (r. 1989–2019 CE)
Heisei 平成	1989–2019 CE	30 years, 112 days	Records of the Grand Historian, Book of Documents	Rejected proposals were Shūbun (修文), Seika (正化).
Emperor (Naruhito) 徳仁 (r. 2019 CE–present)
Reiwa 令和	2019 CE–present	7 years, 122 days	Man'yōshū	First Japanese era name extracted from Japanese literature instead of Chinese literature. Rejected proposals were Eikō (英弘), Kyūka (久化), Kōshi (also rendered as Kōji; 広至), Banna (also rendered as Banwa; 万和), Banpo (also rendered as Banhō; 万保).

== Non-nengō periods ==
Unofficial non-nengō periods (shinengō) before 701 are called itsunengō (逸年号). Pre-Taika chronology intervals include:

- Reign of Emperor Jimmu, 660–581 BCE
- Reign of Emperor Suizei, 581–548 BCE
- Reign of Emperor Annei, 548–510 BC
- Reign of Emperor Itoku, 510–475 BCE
- Reign of Emperor Kōshō, 475–392 BCE
- Reign of Emperor Kōan, 392–290 BC
- Reign of Emperor Kōrei, 290–214 BCE
- Reign of Emperor Kōgen, 214–157 BCE
- Reign of Emperor Kaika, 157–97 BCE
- Reign of Emperor Sujin, 97–29 BCE
- Reign of Emperor Suinin, 29 BCE– 71 CE
- Reign of Emperor Keikō, 71–131 CE
- Reign of Emperor Seimu, 131–192
- Reign of Emperor Chūai, 192–201
- Regency of Empress Jingū, 201–270
- Reign of Emperor Ōjin, 270–313
- Reign of Emperor Nintoku, 313–400
- Reign of Emperor Richū, 400–406
- Reign of Emperor Hanzei, 406–412
- Reign of Emperor Ingyō, 412–454
- Reign of Emperor Ankō, 454–457
- Reign of Emperor Yūryaku, 457–480
- Reign of Emperor Seinei, 480–485
- Reign of Emperor Kenzō, 485–488
- Reign of Emperor Ninken, 488–499
- Reign of Emperor Buretsu, 499–507
- Reign of Emperor Keitai, 507–534
- Reign of Emperor Ankan, 534–536
- Reign of Emperor Senka, 536–540
- Reign of Emperor Kinmei, 540–572
- Reign of Emperor Bidatsu, 572–586
- Reign of Emperor Yōmei, 586–588
- Reign of Emperor Sushun, 588–593
- Reign of Emperor Suiko, 593–629 (Note: The National Diet Library (NDL) website explains that "Japan organized its first calendar in the 12th year of Suiko (604)", which was a pre-nengō time frame.Nussbaum (2005))
- Reign of Emperor Jomei, 629–645

Post-Taika chronology intervals not covered by the nengō system include:

- Reign of Empress Saimei, 655–662 ... Saimei (period)
- Reign of Emperor Tenji, 662–672 ... Tenji (period)
- Reign of Emperor Kōbun, 672–673 ... Kōbun (period) or Sujaku (or Suzaku)
- Reign of Emperor Tenmu, 673–686 ... Tenmu (period) or Hakuhō period
- Reign of Empress Jitō, 687–697 ... Jitō (period)
- Reign of Emperor Monmu, 697–701 ... Monmu (period)

== See also ==
- Calendar
- Japanese calendar
- Japanese imperial year
- Jikkan Jūnishi (sexagenary cycle)
- Regnal name
- Regnal years worldwide
- Related systems:
  - Chinese era name
  - Korean era name
  - Vietnamese era name
