= Taihō (era) =

Period of Japanese history (701–704 CE)

Taihō (大宝) was a Japanese era name (年号, nengō, "year name") after a late 7th century interruption in the sequence of nengō after Shuchō and before Keiun. This period spanned the years from March 701 through May 704. The reigning emperor was Monmu-tennō (文武天皇).

== History ==
In 701, also known as Taihō gannen (大宝元年), the new era name Taihō (meaning "Great Treasure") was proclaimed to memorialize the creation of the "great treasure" of codified organization and laws. The new era commenced on the 21st day of the 3rd month of 701.

=== Timeline ===
Timelines of early Japanese nengō and Imperial reign dates

The system of Japanese era names was not the same as Imperial reign dates.

== Events of the Taihō era ==
- 701 (Taihō 1): Plans for sending a diplomatic mission to the Tang court were approved.
- 702 (Taihō 2): The Taihō Code or Code of Taihō (大宝律令, Taihō-ritsuryō) or Taihōryō reorganizing the central government and completing many of the reforms begun by the Taika Reforms in 646.
- 702 (Taihō 2): A mission to the Tang court, led by Awata no Mahito (粟田真人), embarked on their journey to China, traveling by ship. This was called the "embassy of Taihō" because it was begun during this era.

== Notes ==
| Preceded by — | Era or nengō Taihō; 701–704 | Succeeded by Keiun |
| Preceded by Jitō period 686–697 | Imperial reign dates Monmu period 697–707 | Succeeded by — |
