= Hakuhō period =

Unofficial Japanese era name

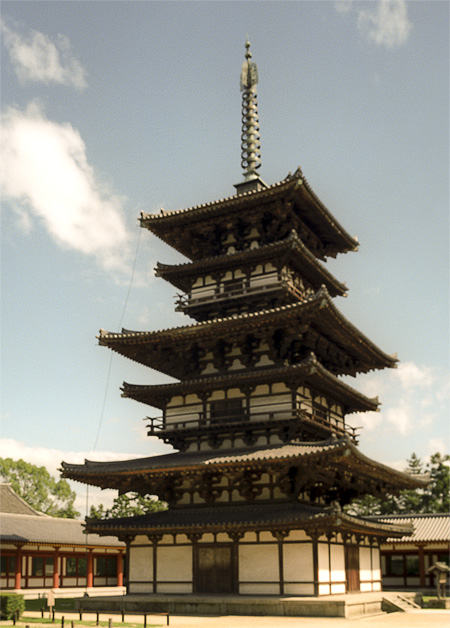
The pagoda at Yakushi-ji, a Buddhist temple built during the Hakuhō period.

The Hakuhō period (白鳳時代, Hakuhō jidai; "white phoenix period") was an unofficial Japanese era name (年号, nengō; "year name") of Emperor Tenmu after Hakuchi and before Suchō. The duration of this discrete non-nengō timespan lasted from 673 through 686.

The Hakuhō period is more often used as a general term which describes a wider range of years.

== History of art ==
Hakuhō is conventionally used to identify a broad historical and artistic period of the late seventh century and early eighth century. The term is primarily used in art history and is thought to have been introduced at the 1910 Japan–British Exhibition.

In general historical contexts, the Asuka period is understood as overlapping the Hakuhō period; and the Hakuhō can be construed as having been followed by a Tempyō period in art history. The Hakuhō period was marked by the rapid expansion of Buddhism and its dissemination throughout Japan. Artistically the period was influenced directly by the Sui and Tang dynasties, and influenced indirectly by Gupta art from India.

Beginning with the Taika Reforms, the period saw a shift towards more structured, more bureaucratic forms of government, based largely on Chinese models. The first "permanent" Imperial capital was established at Fujiwara-kyō in 694. Though the capital was moved again only sixteen years later, this represented an important step in the development of the Yamato state, the seat of power which had been quite transitory and nomadic up until this point. The decades of the Hakuhō period also saw many other major developments in political structure and in culture, including the introduction of writing and the development of calligraphy in Japan. Chinese characters had been seen and used in Japan for centuries prior, but it was during the 7th century that, as one scholar describes it, "writing and the art of its production—or calligraphy—has a sudden and spectacular flowering".

=== Art and Architecture ===
The term "Hakuhō period" is chiefly applied in discussions of architecture, sculpture, and painting.

Hundreds of Buddhist temples were built in the Hakuhō period, including Kawara-dera, Daikandai-ji, and Yakushi-ji in Fujiwara-kyō, in styles showing considerable Tang-dynasty China influence. Wakakusa-dera, which had burnt down in 670, was also rebuilt at this time as Hōryū-ji, showing the same stylistic influences. Following Baekje's ruin in 660, many refugees were naturalised in Japan. And they played a major role in designing and constructing these temples, teaching and training their Japanese counterparts.

At the time, stone and bronze were the chief media used for Buddhist statues in Japan, and would remain so on the continent for quite some time to come. However, in Japan, the wood carved statues which would come to dominate in later centuries began to appear as early as the Hakuhō period.

=== Hōryū-ji ===
The statues in Hōryū-ji serve as good examples of Hakuhō period sculpture; nearly all date to that period. Most are made of wood, with a single block used for the bodies, and separate blocks for secondary elements, such as demons upon which the deity treads, halos, and parts of the deities' skirts. All were originally painted and gilded, and bear rounder forms with a stronger impact of three-dimensionality than the Asuka period statues of earlier decades. In these aspects and others, they reflect strong stylistic influences from the Three Kingdoms of Korea, Tang-dynasty China, and from the stylistic heritage of the Northern Qi and Sui Dynasties which came before. Another group of statues from the same temple show another important development, namely, the first use of lacquer not solely as a protective or decorative coating for statues, but as a material from which accessories, such as a bodhisattva's jewellery, hair ornaments, and hair, might be made, to be attached onto the wooden sculpture.

A series of mural paintings on the walls of the kondō ("Golden Hall"; Main Hall) of Hōryū-ji, depicting various Buddhist figures, represent some of the best extant examples of Hakuhō period painting. Though a 1949 fire left most of the paintings blackened to the point of illegibility, the process can still be determined. Plaster was applied to the walls layer by layer, each layer increasingly fine. Once the plaster was dry, holes were punched in the preliminary sketches for the painting (known as a cartoon), and colored sand or powder was applied, passing through the holes and sticking to the surface of the wall, providing an outline or rough guideline for the painter to then follow. These Hōryū-ji murals represent two painting elements distinctive of this period: the use of red rather than black to outline the figures and, on other sections, a consistent line lacking calligraphic flourish and known as "iron wire" line.

=== Yakushi-ji ===
Yakushi-ji was founded in the Hakuhō period in 680. A number of Buddhist statues at Yakushi-ji temple are counted among the finest extant examples of Hakuhō period sculpture, reflecting the influence of Tang Chinese styles more strongly than their counterparts in Hōryū-ji.

A noteworthy Yakushi Triad (薬師三尊, Yakushi sanzon) consists of three sculptures representing the Yakushi Buddha and two bodhisattvas Nikkō and Gakkō) which are described as "full, fleshy figures conceived in the round and treated as completely natural forms". These three figures were cast in bronze; and they were replaced in the Edo period after their destruction in earthquake or fire. The bodhisattvas are posed in the "hip-slung" (Sanskrit: tribhanga) pose and other Chinese motifs including grape leaves and the Symbols of the Four Directions are prevalent.
