= Periodization =

Categorizing the past into named blocks of time

In historiography, periodization is the process or study of categorizing the past into discrete, quantified, and named blocks of time for the purpose of study or analysis. This is usually done to understand current and historical processes, and the causality that might have linked those events.

Periodizations can provide a convenient segmentation of time, wherein events within the period might consist of relatively similar characteristics. However, determining the precise beginning and ending of any 'period' is often arbitrary, since it has changed over time and over the course of history. Systems of periodization are more or less arbitrary, yet it provides a framework to help us understand them. Periodizing labels are continually challenged and redefined, but once established, period "brands" are so convenient that many are hard to change.

== History ==
The practice of dividing history into ages or periods is as early as the development of writing, and can be traced to the Sumerian period. The Sumerian King List, dating to the second millennium BC—which for most parts is not considered historically accurate—is "periodized" into dynastic regnal eras. The classical division into a Golden Age, Silver Age, Bronze Age, Heroic Age, and Iron Age goes back to Hesiod in the 8th–7th century BC.

One Biblical periodization scheme commonly used in the Middle Ages was Saint Paul's theological division of history into three ages: the first before the age of Moses (under nature); the second under Mosaic law (under law); the third in the age of Christ (under grace). But perhaps the most widely discussed periodization scheme of the Middle Ages was the Six Ages of the World, written by the early 5th century AD, where every age was a thousand years counting from Adam to the present, with the present time (in the Middle Ages) being the sixth and final age.

== Background ==
Periodizing blocks might overlap, conflict or contradict one another. Some have a cultural usage (the "Gilded Age"), others refer to prominent historical events ('the Interwar period), while others are defined by decimal numbering systems ('the 1960s', 'the 17th century'). Other periods are named from influential individuals (the 'Napoleonic Era', the 'Victorian Era', and the 'Porfiriato').

Some of these usages will also be geographically specific. This is especially true of periodizing labels derived from individuals or ruling dynasties, such as the Jacksonian Era in America, the Meiji Era in Japan, or the Merovingian Period in France. Cultural terms may also have a limited reach. Thus the concept of the "Romantic period" is largely meaningless outside the Western world of Europe and European-influenced cultures. Likewise, 'the 1960s', though technically applicable to anywhere in the world according to Common Era numbering, has a certain set of specific cultural connotations in certain countries. For this reason, it may be possible to say such things as "The 1960s never occurred in Spain". This would mean that the sexual revolution, counterculture, youth rebellion and so on never developed during that decade in Spain's conservative Roman Catholic culture and under Francisco Franco's authoritarian regime. The historian Arthur Marwick mentions that "the 1960s' began in the late 1950s and ended in the early 1970s". This was because the cultural and economic conditions that define the meaning of the period covers more than the accidental fact of a 10-year block beginning with the number 6. This extended usage is termed the 'long 1960s'. This usage derives from other historians who have adopted labels such as "the long 19th century" (1789–1914) to reconcile arbitrary decimal chronology with meaningful cultural and social phases. Eric Hobsbawm has also argued for what he calls "the short twentieth century", encompassing the period from the First World War through to the end of the Cold War.

Periodizing terms often have negative or positive connotations that may affect their usage. This includes Victorian, which often negatively suggests sexual repression and class conflict. Other labels such as Renaissance have strongly positive characteristics. As a result, these terms sometimes extend in meaning. Thus the English Renaissance is often used for a period largely identical to the Elizabethan Period or reign of Elizabeth I, and begins some 200 years later than the Italian Renaissance. However the Carolingian Renaissance is said to have occurred during the reign of the Frankish king Charlemagne, and his immediate successors, and the Macedonian Renaissance occurred in the Eastern Roman Empire. Other examples, neither of which constituted a "rebirth" in the sense of revival, are the American Renaissance of the 1820s–1860s, referring mainly to literature, and the Harlem Renaissance of the 1920s, referring mainly to literature but also to music and the visual arts.

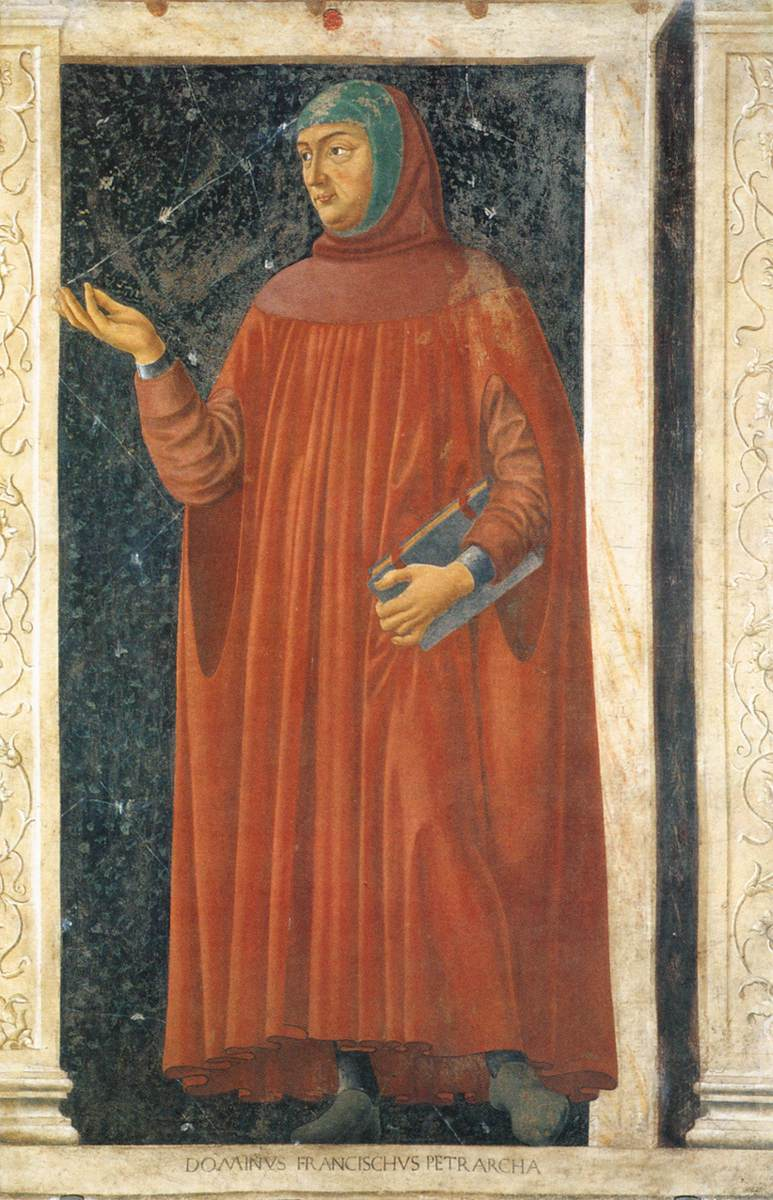
Petrarch conceived of the idea of a European "Dark Age" which later evolved into the tripartite periodization of Western history into Ancient, Post-classical and Modern.

The conception of a 'rebirth' of Classical Latin learning is first credited to the Italian poet Petrarch (1304–1374), the father of Renaissance Humanism, but the conception of a rebirth has been in common use since Petrarch's time. The dominant usage of the word Renaissance refers to the cultural changes that occurred in Italy that culminated in the High Renaissance around 1500–1530. This concept applies dominantly to the visual arts, and the work of Michelangelo, Raphael, and Leonardo da Vinci. Secondarily it is applied to other arts, but it is questionable whether it is useful to describe a phase in economic, social and political history. Many professional historians now refer to the historical periods commonly known as the Renaissance and the Reformation as the start of the Early Modern Period, which extends much later. There is a gradual change in the courses taught and books published to correspond to the change in period nomenclature, which in part reflects differences between social history and cultural history. The new nomenclature suggests a broader geographical coverage and a growing attention to the relationships between Europe and the wider world.

The term Middle Ages also derives from Petrarch. He was comparing his own period to the Ancient or Classical world, seeing his time as a time of rebirth after a dark intermediate period, the Middle Ages. The idea that the Middle Ages was a middle phase between two other large scale periodizing concepts, Ancient and Modern, still persists. It can be subdivided into the Early, High and Late Middle Ages. The term Dark Ages is no longer in common use among modern scholars because of the difficulty of using it neutrally, though some writers have attempted to retain it and divest it of its negative connotations. The term "Middle Ages" and especially the adjective medieval can also have a negative ring in colloquial use, but does not carry over into academic terminology. However, other terms, such as Gothic architecture, used to refer to a style typical of the High Middle Ages have largely lost the negative connotations they initially had, acquiring new meanings over time (see Gothic architecture and Goth subculture).

The Gothic and the Baroque were both named during subsequent stylistic periods when the preceding style was unpopular. The word "Gothic" was applied as a pejorative term to all things Northern European and, hence, barbarian, probably first by Giorgio Vasari. He coined the term "Gothic" in an effort to describe (particularly architecture) what he found objectionable. The word baroque—derived from similar words in Portuguese, Spanish, or French—literally refers to an irregular or misshapen pearl. Its first use outside the field of jewellery manufacture was in the early 18th century, as a criticism of music that was viewed as over-complicated and rough. Later, the term was also used to describe architecture and art. The Baroque period was first designated as such in the 19th century, and is generally considered to have begun around 1600 in all media. Music history places the end of the period in the year 1750 with the death of J. S. Bach, while art historians consider the main period to have ended significantly earlier in most areas.

== Three-age system ==
In archeology, the usual method for periodization of the distant prehistoric past is to rely on changes in material culture and technology, such as the Stone Age, Bronze Age and Iron Age and their sub-divisions also based on different styles of material remains. Despite the development over recent decades of the ability through radiocarbon dating and other scientific methods to give actual dates for many sites or artefacts, these long-established schemes seem likely to remain in use. In many cases neighbouring cultures with writing have left some history of cultures without it, which may be used. The system further underwent subdivisions, including the 1865 partitioning of the Stone Age into Palaeolithic, Mesolithic and Neolithic periods by John Lubbock.

== Historiography ==
Some events or short periods of change have such a drastic effect on the cultures they affect that they form a natural break in history. These are often marked by the widespread use of both pre- and post- phrases centered on the event, as in pre-Reformation and post-Reformation, or pre-colonial and post-colonial. Both pre-war and post-war are still understood to refer to World War II, though at some future point the phrases will need to be altered to make that clear.

== World history ==
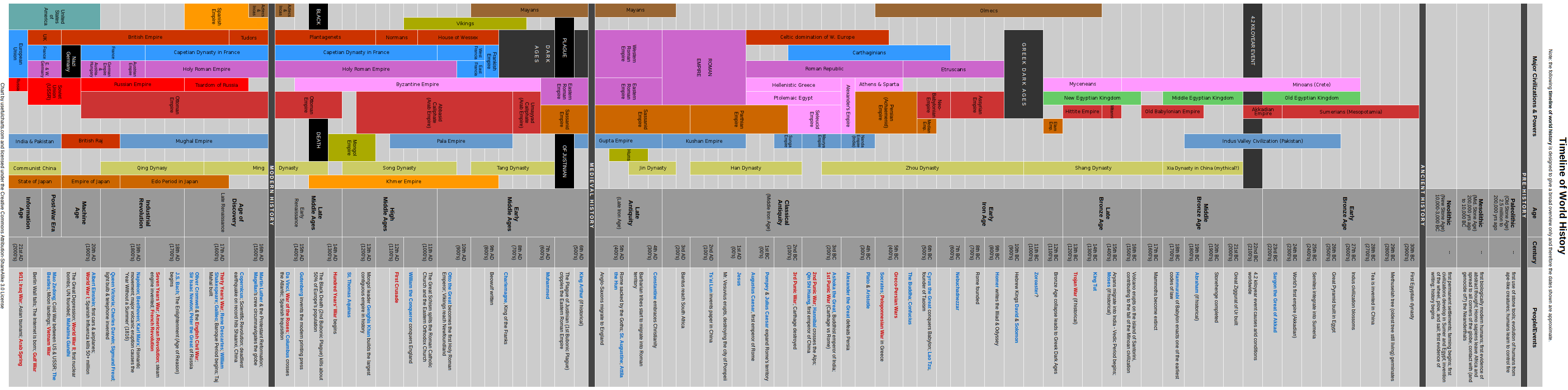
Example of periodizations in history

Several major periods that English-speaking and Germanic historians may use are:

1. Prehistory
2. Ancient history
3. Late antiquity
4. Post-classical history
5. Early modern period
6. Modern history (sometimes the nineteenth century and modern are combined)
7. Contemporary history

In French and Romance-language historiography, the early modern period is labelled "modern" (Spanish: edad moderna) and the late modern and contemporary periods are grouped as "contemporary" (Spanish: edad contemporánea).

Although post-classical is synonymous with the Middle Ages of Western Europe, the term post-classical is not necessarily a member of the traditional tripartite periodization of Western European history into 'classical', 'middle' and 'modern'.

Some popularized periodizations using the terms long or short by historians are:

- Long eighteenth century
- Long nineteenth century
- Short twentieth century

== See also ==
- List of time periods
- List of archaeological periods
- Regnal year
- Geological era
- Cosmological epoch
- Japanese era name
- Chronological dating
