= Paul Tsuchihashi =

Paul Yachita Tsuchihashi (土橋 八千太, Tsuchihashi Yachita; 4 December 1866 – 3 March 1965) SJ was a Japanese Roman Catholic priest, mathematician, astronomer, Sinologist, lexicographer, academic and administrator. Father Paul is known for having developed extensive tables for converting traditional Japanese era dates into Gregorian calendar equivalents — compare, e.g., Calendrical Time Conversion Table which is derived from a formula for determining the numbered date in the Japanese month.

== Biography ==
Tsuchihashi was born in Suwa, Nagano on April 12, 1866. He entered the Jesuits on September 7, 1888, was ordained a priest on August 24, 1901, and professed final vows on February 2, 1905.

== Career ==
After completing studies in Paris, Tsuchihashi was assigned to Shanghai and the observatory at She Shan Hill (Zose). In this period, his work focused on the movement of asteroids. He also taught mathematics at the Jesuit Aurora University in Xujiahui.

When Sophia University was established in Tokyo in 1913, he became one of the members of the teaching faculty. He taught mathematics and Chinese literature. He was Rector of the university from 1940 until the end of the war years.

== Honors ==
- Order of the Sacred Treasure

== Selected works ==
In a statistical overview derived from writings by and about Paul Tsuchihashi, OCLC/WorldCat encompasses roughly 10+ works in 20 publications in 3 languages and 200+ library holdings.

- Japanese Chronological Tables from 601 to 1872 (邦曆西曆對照表: 自推古九年至明治五年, Hōreki seireki taishōhyō: Suiko kyūnen yori Meiji gonen ni itaru), 1952 OCLC 001291275
