= Hakuchi (era) =

Period of Japanese history (650–654 CE)

Hakuchi (白雉) was a Japanese era name (年号, nengō, lit. "year name") after the Taika era and before Shuchō. This period spanned the years from February 650 through December 654. The reigning emperor was Kōtoku-tennō (孝徳天皇).

== History ==
The era began in 650, the sixth year of the Taika era, which was thus known as Hakuchi gannen (白雉元年, "Hakuchi start"). The daimyō of Nagato Province brought a white pheasant to the court as a gift for the emperor. This white pheasant was then construed as a good omen. Emperor Kōtoku was extraordinarily pleased by this special avian rarity, and he wanted the entire court to see this white bird for themselves. He commanded a special audience in which he could formally invite the sadaijin and the udaijin to join him in admiring the rare bird; and on this occasion, the emperor caused the nengō to be changed to Hakuchi (meaning "white pheasant").

In Japan, this was the second nengō, derived from the Chinese system of eras (nianhao); although some scholarly doubt has been cast on the authenticity of Taika and Hakuchi as historically legitimate era names.

=== Timeline ===
Timelines of early Japanese nengō and Imperial reign dates

The system of Japanese era names was not the same as Imperial reign dates.

== Events of the Hakuchi era ==
- 650 (Hakuchi 1): Kōtoku commanded that all prisoners were to be granted liberty throughout the country.
- 654 (Hakuchi 5, 1st month): A great number of rats moved into the province of Yamato; and this was construed as a sign that the capital should be moved.
- 654 (Hakuchi 5): Kōtoku died at the age of 59 after a reign of 10 years—five years during Taika, and five years during Hakuchi.

== Notes ==
Preceded by Taika	Era or nengō Hakuchi; 650–652	Succeeded by —
Preceded by —	Imperial reign dates Kōtoku period 645–654	Succeeded by Saimei period 655–661
