= Taika (era) =

Period in Japan history (645–650 CE)

Taika (大化) was a Japanese era name (年号, nengō) during the reign of Kōtoku. The Taika era immediately preceded the Hakuchi era. This period spanned the years from August 645 through February 650.

== History ==
In 645, also known as Taika 1 (大化元年), the new era name was created to mark the beginning of the reign of the emperor Kōtoku. The previous reign ended and the new one commenced in the fourth year after the beginning of Empress Kōgyoku's reign.

In Japan, this was the first nengō, derived from the Chinese system of eras (nianhao); although some scholarly doubt has been cast on the authenticity of Taika and Hakuchi as historically legitimate era names.

=== Timeline ===
Timelines of early Japanese nengō and Imperial reign dates

The system of Japanese era names was not the same as Imperial reign dates.

== Events of the Taika era ==
- 645 (Taika 1): Empress Kōgyoku abdicates; and her brother receives the succession (senso). Shortly thereafter, Emperor Kōtoku formally accedes to the throne (sokui).
- 645 (Taika 1): Kōtoku introduces the Taika reform (大化の改新, Taika no kaishin). The ideas and goals of this systemic reform (律令, ritsuryō) were memorialized in a series of articles which formally bore the imprimatur of the emperor. Kōtoku officially divided Japan into eight provinces. The Taika reforms also sought to regulate the rank of government officials who were to be distinguished by 19 sorts of official hats or caps with differing forms and different colors according to a very strictly defined hierarchy.
- 645 (Taika 1): Kōtoku decides to abandon Asuka, which had been the capital city up to this time. Instead, he transferred the capital to Naniwa, which is in the general vicinity of the Bay of Osaka. In this new location, Kōtoku centralized his power without further delay. Kōtoku lived in a palace which had been newly constructed for him on a promontory. The name of this palace was Toyosaki-no-Miya. The palace was at Nagara, in the general area of Naniwa in Settsu province.
- 646 (Taika 2, 1st day of the 1st month): Kōtoku established a regular calendar for the court, with major audiences scheduled only on certain days. The emperor also addressed a number of matters which would affect all parts of Japan—as for example, creating judicial districts, establishing guard posts on major roads, arranging for postal relay systems, dividing the country in governable units with separations following the natural boundaries created by mountains and rivers, appointing governors for each province, and fixing the amounts porters might be able to charge. Kōtoku named the chiefs in the districts and the villages; and for the first time, it became possible to register the number of houses and the numbers of people in each location, the taxes to be exacted from each area and the varying products from throughout the land. He also mandated that from every hundred households, one beautiful young woman should be sent for service in the palace household. He arranged that in each year, an officer from the central court should be sent to each province to examine the conduct of the governors and their government. The emperor also initiated plans for building storehouses of goods and arsenals which would serve the needs of a national army or militia. The udaijin Sogo Yamada Ishikawa Maro was specifically charged with the task of planning so that all the faults that could be attributed to mistakes of government would not happen—or could be mitigated. This was also a time in which the greater part of the rules of etiquette and customs of the court were revised or contrived. Naka-no Ōe-shinnō (imperial prince of a shinnōke and the sesshō Nakatomi no Kamatari counseled these and other measures intended to make Japan a better and stronger country.
- 649 (Taika 5,7th day of the third month): The sadaijin Abe no Kurahashi Maro died.
- 649 (Taika 5, 3rd month): Sogo-no Kiyouga, the younger brother of the udaijin Soga Yamada Ishikawa Maro, informed the emperor that his older brother was involved in a conspiracy against the emperor. On the basis of this information, Kōtoku sent men to the udaijin's home with plans to put the traitor to death. Yamada somehow learned about this in advance, and he then decided to kill himself. Shortly thereafter, after Yamada's innocence had been proven, the surviving brother, Kiyouga, was punished. For his part in misleading the emperor and in causing the udaijin to kill himself, Kiyouga was exiled to Tokachi on the northern island of Hokkaidō, which was a largely unpopulated wilderness at that time.
- 649 (Taika 5,20th day of the 4th month): Kose no Toko no Ō-omi (593–658) was named sadaijin shortly after his predecessor died.
- 649 (Taika 5, 4th month): Ōtomo Nagatoko no Muraji was made udaijin.
- 649 (Taika 5): In this year, the Emperor decreed the establishment of a new system of government, (the hasshō hyakkan), which was composed of eight ministries and 100 bureaus.
- 650 (Taika 6): The Hakuchi era began in the sixth year of the Taika era. The daimyō of Nagato province brought a white pheasant to the court as a gift for the emperor. This white pheasant was then construed as a good omen. Emperor Kōtoku was extraordinarily pleased by this special avian rarity, and he wanted the entire court to see this white bird for themselves. He commanded a special audience in which he could formally invite the sadaijin and the udaijin to join him in admiring the rare bird; and on this occasion, the emperor caused the nengō to be changed to Hakuchi (meaning "white pheasant").

== Notes ==
Preceded by —	Era or nengō Taika; 645–650	Succeeded by Hakuchi
Preceded by Kōgyoku period 642–645	Imperial reign dates Kōtoku period 645–654	Succeeded by —
