= Shuchō =

Period of Japanese history (686 CE)

Shuchō (朱鳥), alternatively read as Suchō or Akamitori, was a Japanese era name (年号, nengō, "year name") after a gap following Hakuchi (650–654) and before another gap lasting until Taihō (701–704). This Shuchō period briefly spanned a period of mere months, June through September 686. The reigning sovereigns were Tenmu-tennō (天武天皇) and Jitō-tennō (持統天皇).

== History ==
In 686, also known as Shuchō gannen (朱鳥元年), the new era name referred to the red bird of the south, which was one of the Chinese directional animals. The nengō did not survive Emperor Tenmu's death. The era ended with the accession of Temmu's successor, Empress Jitō.

=== Timeline ===
Timelines of early Japanese nengō and Imperial reign dates

The system of Japanese era names was not the same as Imperial reign dates.

== Events of the Shuchō era ==
- 686 (Shuchō 1, 9th day of the 9th month): Emperor Tenmu dies
- 686 (Shuchō 1, 2nd day of the 10th month): rebellion of Prince Ōtsu discovered; he and conspirators are arrested
- 686 (Shuchō 1, 3rd day of the 10th month): Prince Ōtsu commits suicide
- 686 (Shuchō 1, 16th day of the 11th month): Princess Ōku, Prince Ōtsu's sister, is removed from position at Ise Shrine
- 686 (Shuchō 1, 17th day of the 11th month): earthquake

== Notes ==
Preceded by —	Era or nengō Shuchō; 686	Succeeded by —
Preceded by Kōbun period 672	Imperial reign dates Tenmu period 673–686	Succeeded by Jitō period 686–697
