= 1249 =

1249 in various calendars
- Gregorian calendar: 1249; MCCXLIX
- Ab urbe condita: 2002
- Armenian calendar: 698; ԹՎ ՈՂԸ
- Assyrian calendar: 5999
- Balinese saka calendar: 1170–1171
- Bengali calendar: 655–656
- Berber calendar: 2199
- English Regnal year: 33 Hen. 3 – 34 Hen. 3
- Buddhist calendar: 1793
- Burmese calendar: 611
- Byzantine calendar: 6757–6758
- Chinese calendar: 戊申年 (Earth Monkey); 3946 or 3739 — to — 己酉年 (Earth Rooster); 3947 or 3740
- Coptic calendar: 965–966
- Discordian calendar: 2415
- Ethiopian calendar: 1241–1242
- Hebrew calendar: 5009–5010
- Hindu calendars
- Vikram Samvat: 1305–1306
- Shaka Samvat: 1170–1171
- Kali Yuga: 4349–4350
- Holocene calendar: 11249
- Igbo calendar: 249–250
- Iranian calendar: 627–628
- Islamic calendar: 646–647
- Japanese calendar: Hōji 3 / Kenchō 1 (建長元年)
- Javanese calendar: 1158–1159
- Julian calendar: 1249; MCCXLIX
- Korean calendar: 3582
- Minguo calendar: 663 before ROC 民前663年
- Nanakshahi calendar: −219
- Thai solar calendar: 1791–1792
- Tibetan calendar: ས་ཕོ་སྤྲེ་ལོ་ (male Earth-Monkey); 1375 or 994 or 222 — to — ས་མོ་བྱ་ལོ་ (female Earth-Bird); 1376 or 995 or 223

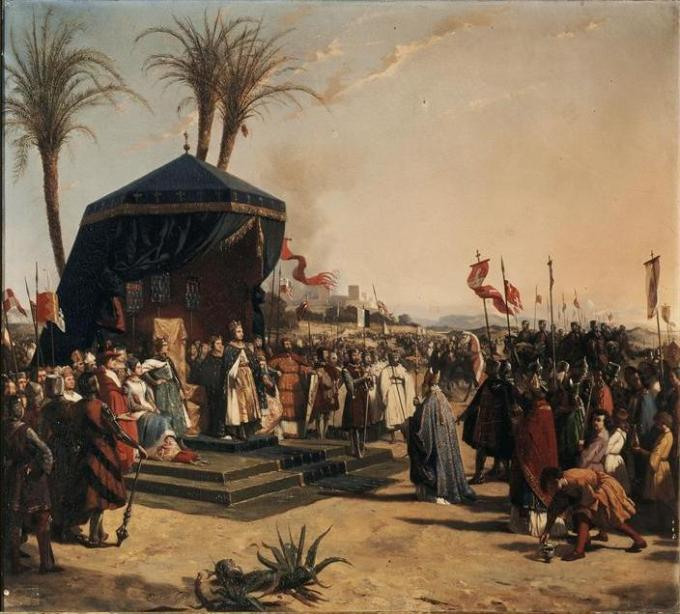
King Louis IX receives Patriarch Robert of Nantes at Damietta in Egypt (1847)

Year 1249 (MCCXLIX) was a common year starting on Friday of the Julian calendar.

== Events ==
=== By place ===
==== Seventh Crusade ====
- May 13 – King Louis IX of France ("the Saint") assembles a Crusader fleet of 120 transports and embarks an army (some 15,000 men) at Limassol. Unfortunately, a storm scatters the ships a few days later. On May 30, Louis sets sail to Egypt – only a quarter of his forces sails with him, the others make their way independently to the Egyptian coast. Finally, the royal squadron arrives off Damietta on June 4 aboard Louis' flagship the Montjoie. The king's advisers urges a delay until the rest of his transports arrive before attempting to disembark, but Louis refuses.
- June 5 – Siege of Damietta: Louis IX lands with a Crusader force and captures Damietta, after a fierce battle at the edge of the sea. The onslaught of the knights of France and those of Outremer under John of Ibelin, force the Ayyubids back with heavy losses. At nightfall, Fakhr ad-Din withdraws his army over a bridge of boats to Damietta. Finding the population there in panic and the garrison wavering, Fakhr ad-Din decides to evacuate the city. On June 6, Louis marches triumphantly over the bridge into Damietta and builds a camp to attack Cairo.
- November 20 – Louis IX sets out (against the advice of his nobles) with a Crusader force from Damietta, along the southern road to Mansourah. A garrison is left to guard the city – where Queen Margaret of Provence and Patriarch Robert of Nantes remain. The Crusaders make slow progress along the Nile, carrying a number of supplies and equipment. After 32 days, Louis orders to make camp opposite the Ayyubid camp near Mansourah, protected by a branch of the river and fortifications. Both camps use their catapults to bombard each other.
- December – Louis IX consolidates his forces at Mansourah. After the death of Sultan As-Salih Ayyub, Fakhr ad-Din effectively becomes the ruler of Egypt. He takes command of the city's defense and his cavalry harasses the Crusaders but none of these skirmishes is successful in holding up the Crusader's advance. Meanwhile, Louis orders the construction of a dyke at Mansourah, although the Crusaders build covered galleries to protect the workmen, the Egyptian bombardment (particularly Greek fire), is so formidable that the work is halted.

==== Europe ====
- February 16 – Louis IX sends Andrew of Longjumeau on a diplomatic mission to meet the "Great Khan" of the Mongol Empire. He carries letters from Louis and the Papal States, and rich presents, including a chapel-tent lined with scarlet cloth and embroidered with sacred pictures. From Cyprus he goes to the port of Antioch in Syria and travels for a year to the khan's court at Karakorum.
- May – Nicaean–Latin Wars: Latin forces led by William of Villehardouin, arrive on the island of Rhodes on their way to join the Seventh Crusade. This causes the Nicaeans to raise the siege of Rhodes. William concludes an agreement with the Genoese and leaves behind some 100 knights before departing for the Holy Land.
- May 26 – Battle of Fossalta: King Enzo of Sardinia, an illegitimate son of Emperor Frederick II, is captured and imprisoned by Lombard forces, in a clash between the Guelphs and Ghibellines. Enzo is put in golden chains and paraded around Bologna on a horse. He becomes a prisoner in a palace, named Palazzo Re Enzo.
- July 6 – King Alexander II of Scotland dies of a fever at the island of Kerrera in the Inner Hebrides. He is succeeded by his 7-year-old son, Alexander III, who is crowned as ruler of Scotland at Scone on July 13. Alexander's minority causes a struggle for control of affairs between Walter Comyn and Alan Durward, Justiciar of Scotia.
- Summer – Second Swedish Crusade: A Swedish expedition led by Birger Jarl subjugates the province of Tavastia – securing Swedish power in Finland. As a part of the Treaty of Lödöse Birger marries off his 11-year-old daughter Rikissa to Haakon the Young, ruler and eldest son of King Haakon IV of Norway.
- August 15 – First Battle of Athenry: Gaelic forces of Connacht besiege Athenry Castle in County Galway in Ireland, but are repelled by the Normans under Jordan de Exeter, Sheriff of Connacht.
- Reconquista: King Afonso III of Portugal ("the Boulonnais") recaptures Faro and Silves in the Algarve from the Almohads, thus completing the expulsion of the Moors from Portugal. The Almohads also lose possession of Alicante in Al-Andalus (modern Spain).
- Winter – William of Villehardouin tours the Peloponnese and selects sites for new fortifications such as Grand Magne and Leuktron. At Mystras (ancient Sparta), he builds a fortress and a palace.

==== Asia ====
- March – The Japanese Hōji period ends during the reign of Emperor Go-Fukakusa and the Kenchō period begins (until 1256).
- The Hikitsuke, a judicial organ of the Kamakura and Ashikaga shogunates of Japan, is established.

=== By topic ===
==== Cities and Towns ====
- The city of Stralsund is burned to the ground, by German forces from the rival Free City of Lübeck. Later, the town is rebuilt with a massive defensive wall having 11 city gates and some 30 watchtowers.

==== Education ====
- Spring – University College, the first college at Oxford, is founded with money from the estate of William of Durham.

==== Microhistory ====
- Jean Mouflet makes an agreement with the abbot of Saint-Pierre-le-Vif in the Senonais region in France: in return for an annual payment, the monastery will recognize Jean as a "citizen of Sens". He is a leather merchant, with a leather shop that he leases for the rent of 50 shillings a year. The agreement is witnessed by Jean's wife, Douce, daughter of a wealthy and prominent citizen of Sens, Felis Charpentier.

==== Science ====
- Roger Bacon publishes a major scientific work, including writings of convex lens spectacles for treating long-sightedness, and the first publication of the formula for gunpowder in the western world.

== Births ==
- July 9 – Emperor Kameyama of Japan (d. 1305)
- September 4 – Amadeus V, count of Savoy (d. 1323)
- December 26 – Edmund, English nobleman (d. 1300)
- Constance II of Sicily, queen consort of Aragon (d. 1302)
- Frederick I, margrave of Baden and Verona (d. 1268)
- Gaucher V de Châtillon, French nobleman (d. 1329)
- Humphrey VI de Bohun, English nobleman (d. 1298)
- John XXII, pope of the Catholic Church (d. 1334)
- Menachem Meiri, Catalan rabbi and writer (d. 1315)
- Richard of Middleton, Norman theologian (d. 1308)
- Robert III, Flemish nobleman and knight (d. 1322)
- Wu Cheng, Chinese philosopher and poet (d. 1333)
- Zhu Shijie (or "Hanqing"), Chinese mathematician

== Deaths ==
- January 15 – Archambaud IX, French nobleman
- March 9 – Siegfried III, archbishop of Mainz (b. 1194)
- April 16 – Contardo of Este, Italian nobleman (b. 1216)
- June 28 – Adolf I of the Mark, German nobleman
- July 6 – Alexander II, king of Scotland (b. 1198)
- July 19 – Jacopo Tiepolo, doge of Venice (b. 1169)
- August 31 – Rodrigo Díaz, Spanish prelate and bishop
- September 27 – Raymond VII, French nobleman (b. 1197)
- October 5 – Abu Zakariya Yahya, Hafsid ruler (b. 1203)
- November 22
  - As-Salih Ayyub, Ayyubid ruler of Egypt (b. 1205)
  - Geoffrey de Liberatione, Scottish cleric and bishop
- December 10 – Choe U, Korean military leader (b. 1166)
- December 18 – Conrad II of Reifenberg, German bishop
- Dōjonyūdō, Japanese nobleman and waka poet (b. 1196)
- Hugh X of Lusignan, French nobleman and knight (b. 1183)
- John I of Montfort, Breton nobleman and knight (b. 1228)
- Pietro della Vigna, Italian chancellor and diplomat (d. 1190)
- Robert I ("the Chaplain"), Scoto-Norman priest and bishop
- Song Ci, Chinese physician, judge and scientist (b. 1186)
- William of Auvergne, French bishop and writer (b. 1180)
- Wuzhun Shifan, Chinese monk and calligrapher (b. 1178)
