= Shijō Sadako =

Japanese noblewoman (1196–1302)

Shijō Sadako 四条貞子
- Other names: Fujiwara no Sadako (藤原貞子)
- Born: 1196; Japan
- Died: 22 October 1302 (aged 105–106); Japan
- Noble family: Shijō clan (branch of the Fujiwara Hok-ke)
- Spouse: Saionji Saneuji
- Issue: Saionji Kisshi; Fujiwara no Kimiko
- Father: Shijō Takahira
- Mother: Dainagon Sanmi

Shijō Sadako (四条貞子) was a Japanese noblewoman born in 1196 to Shijō Takahira and Dainagon Sanmi. She had two daughters, both of whom became empress consorts. She is best remembered for her long life, as she lived to 106.

== Life ==
Shijō Sadako was born in 1196 to Shijō Takahira and Dainagon Sanmi. Sadako married Saionji Saneuji, and had two daughters, both of whom became empress consorts.

She became the wet nurse of Emperor Shijō; however, Shijō died in an accident after attempting to trip two court ladies with talc.

A conflict ensued over succession, with Prince Kunihito ultimately winning. The court nobles initially opposed Kunihito, and so Saionji Kintsune enthroned the prince in the house of Sadako's brother. Sadako's daughter, Saionji Kisshi, also married the new emperor, Go-Saga.

As she got older, Sadako built a new residence in Kitayama which was described as a magnificent mansion.

In 1282 she performed a pre-death memorial service for herself, and the prayer still exists as an Important Cultural Property.

Her 90th birthday saw a grand celebration at her manor. She died in 1302, aged 106.

== Age ==
Traditionally, her age has been listed as 107. This reflects the traditional Japanese age reckoning, under which a person was one year old at birth. In the traditional Japanese calendar, Sadako was born in Kenkyū 7 (1196) and died in Shōan 4 (1302) making her 105 or 106. The age of 106 is generally accepted. She was the oldest Japanese person to have lived up to that point.

== Descendants ==
Through her daughter Kisshi, she lived to be the grandmother of two emperors, great-grandmother of two more, and great-great-grandmother of a further two, as well as great-grandmother of one shōgun. The following are the descendants she lived to see become emperor and shōgun:

- Emperor Go-Fukakusa (r. 16 February 1246 – 9 January 1260)
  - Emperor Fushimi (r. 27 November 1287 – 30 August 1298)
    - Emperor Go-Fushimi (r. 30 August 1298 – 2 March 1301)
  - Shōgun Prince Hisaaki (r. 24 October 1289 – 20 August 1308)
- Emperor Kameyama (r. 9 January 1260 – 6 March 1274)
  - Emperor Go-Uda (r. 6 March 1274 – 27 November 1287)
    - Emperor Go-Nijō (r. 2 March 1301 – 10 September 1308)
