= Hōfuku-ji =

Buddhist temple in Sōja, Okayama, Japan

- 宝福寺
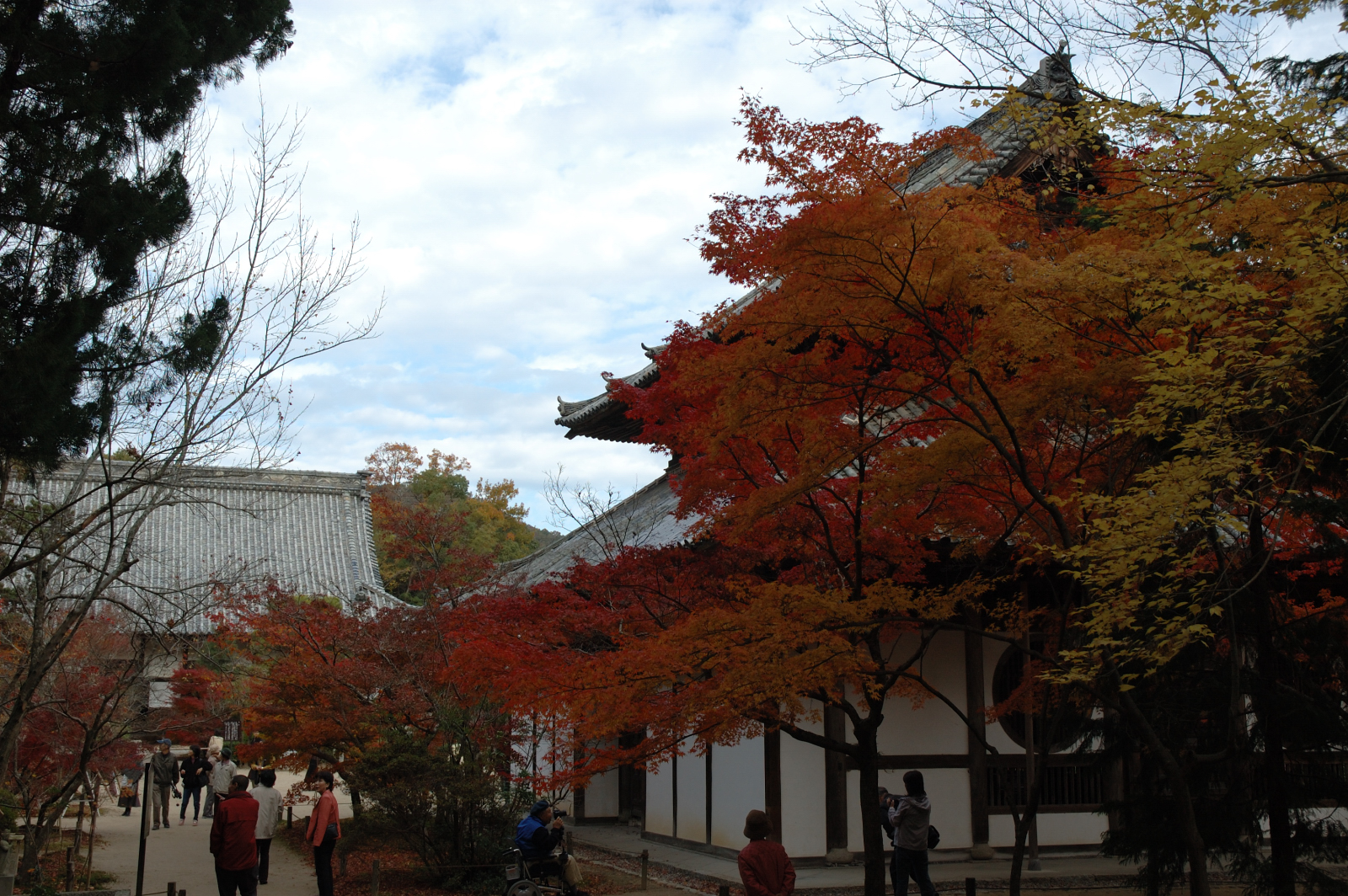
- Hōfuku-ji

- Location within Okayama Prefecture Location within Japan

Religion
- Affiliation: Buddhist
- Deity: Kokuzō Bosatsu
- Rite: Rinzai school or Japanese Zen
- Status: functional

Location
- Location: 1968 Ijirino, Sōja-shi, Okayama-ken
- Coordinates: 34°41′28.7″N 133°44′2.3″E

Website
- Official website
- National Important Cultural Property Okayama Prefecture Historic Site

Hōfuku-ji (宝福寺) is a Buddhist temple located in the Ijirino neighborhood of the city of Sōja, Okayama, Japan. It belongs to the Tōfuku-ji sect of the Rinzai school of Japanese Zen and its honzon is a statue of Kokuzō Bosatsu. It is noted for its connection with the Muromachi period painter-monk Sesshū. The graves of politicians Ryugo Hashimoto (who served as Minister of Education and Minister of Health) and his son Ryutaro Hashimoto (82nd and 83rd Prime Minister of Japan) are located here. The temple's precincts were designated a Yamaguchi Prefecture Historic Site in 2000.

== Overview ==
The founding of this temple is uncertain, but it is believed to have been established by the Tendai monk Nichirin, and was originally a Tendai sect temple. In the first year of Jōei (1232) during the Kamakura period, it was converted into a Zen temple by the monk Don'an Eisō, who was from Makabe, Bitchū Province (currently part of present-day Sōja). At that time, Emperor Shijō was ill. When Don'an prayed for the emperor's recovery, a meteor fell in front of the altar, and the emperor recovered. A well was dug where the meteor fell and named "Senjaku-i" (Thousand-Foot Well). This became the origin of the sangō (mountain name) "Iyama." Subsequently, the temple flourished as an imperial prayer temple. At one point, it grew to have 55 sub-temples and 300 branch temples. However, during the Bitchū Rebellion of the Sengoku period, it sided with the losing side led by the local Mimura clan, and in 1575, all but the three-story pagoda were destroyed by fire. Afterward, the fell into disrepair until the Edo period. It was restored in the early Edo period, becoming a full-fledged shichidō garan Zen temple with seven main buildings in the Zen style: i.e. a Sanmon main gate, Butsuden, abbot's quarters (Hōjō), kitchen, Zen-dō, bell tower, and sutra repository. The current Butsuden was rebuilt in 1735.

== Connection with Sesshū ==
Sesshū was born in Akahama (now part of Sōja) around 1420. Little is known about Sesshū's early life, but it is known that he was sent to Hōfuku-ji as a child acolyte. Young Sesshū loved to draw, and neglected his training, spending most of his time drawing. To encourage him to focus on his studies, the Zen master tied Sesshū to a pillar to prompt reflection. In the evening, the Zen master came to check on him and found a mouse trying to escape. He tried to catch it, but it would not move. Upon closer inspection, it turned out to be a drawing made by Sesshu's big toe, using his tears and the dust at his feet as ink.

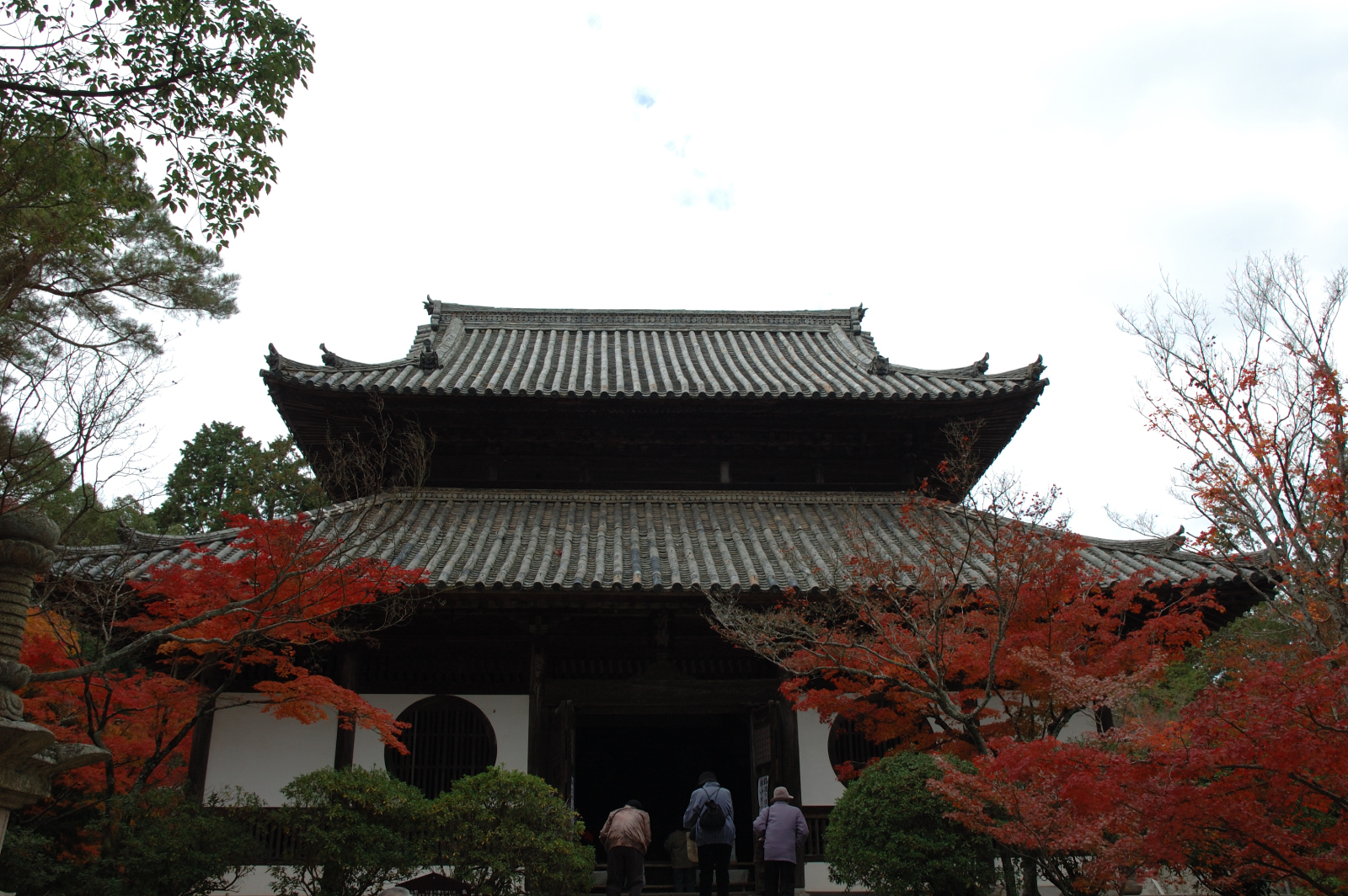
Butsuden

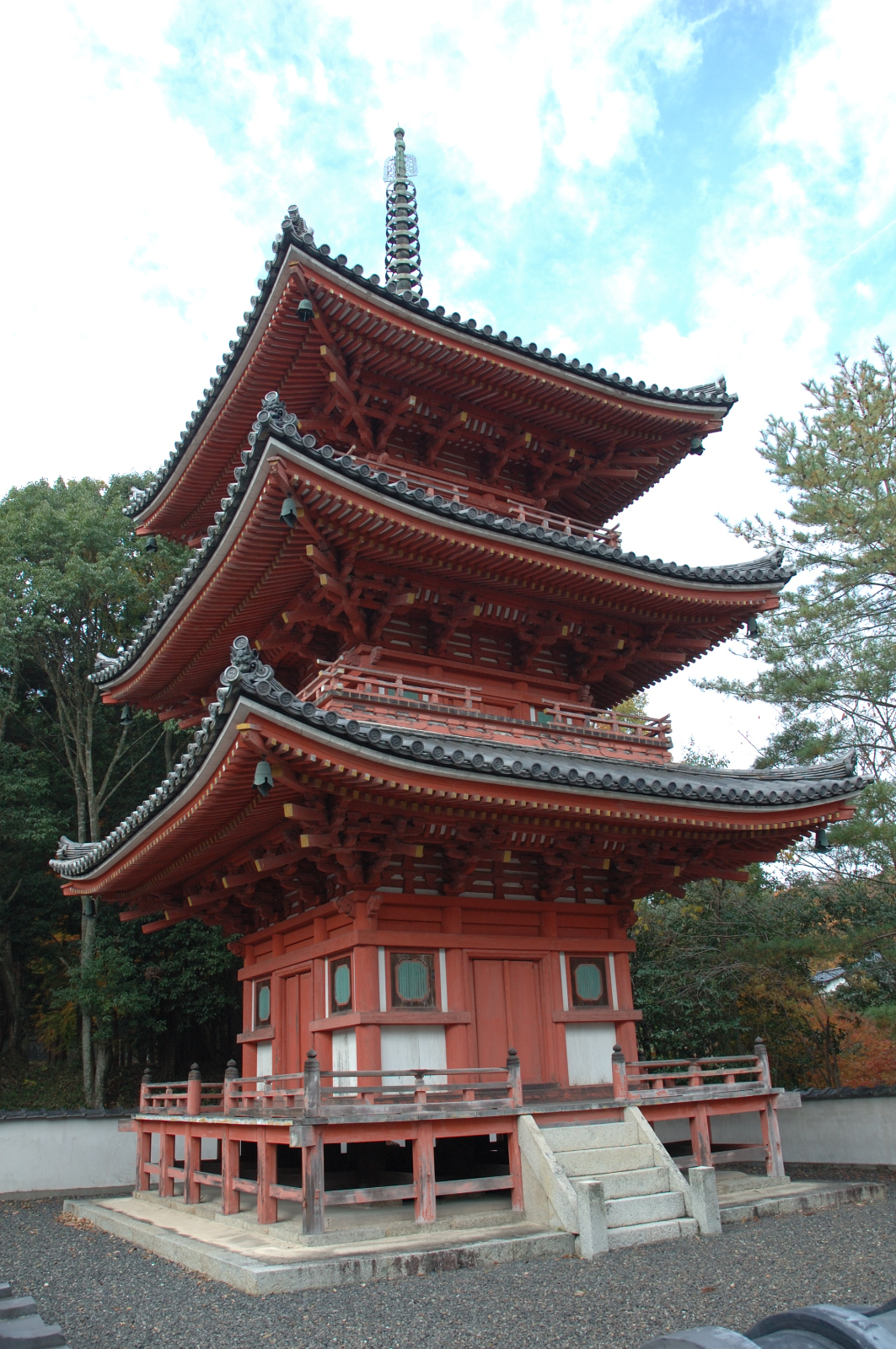
Three-story Pagoda (ICP)

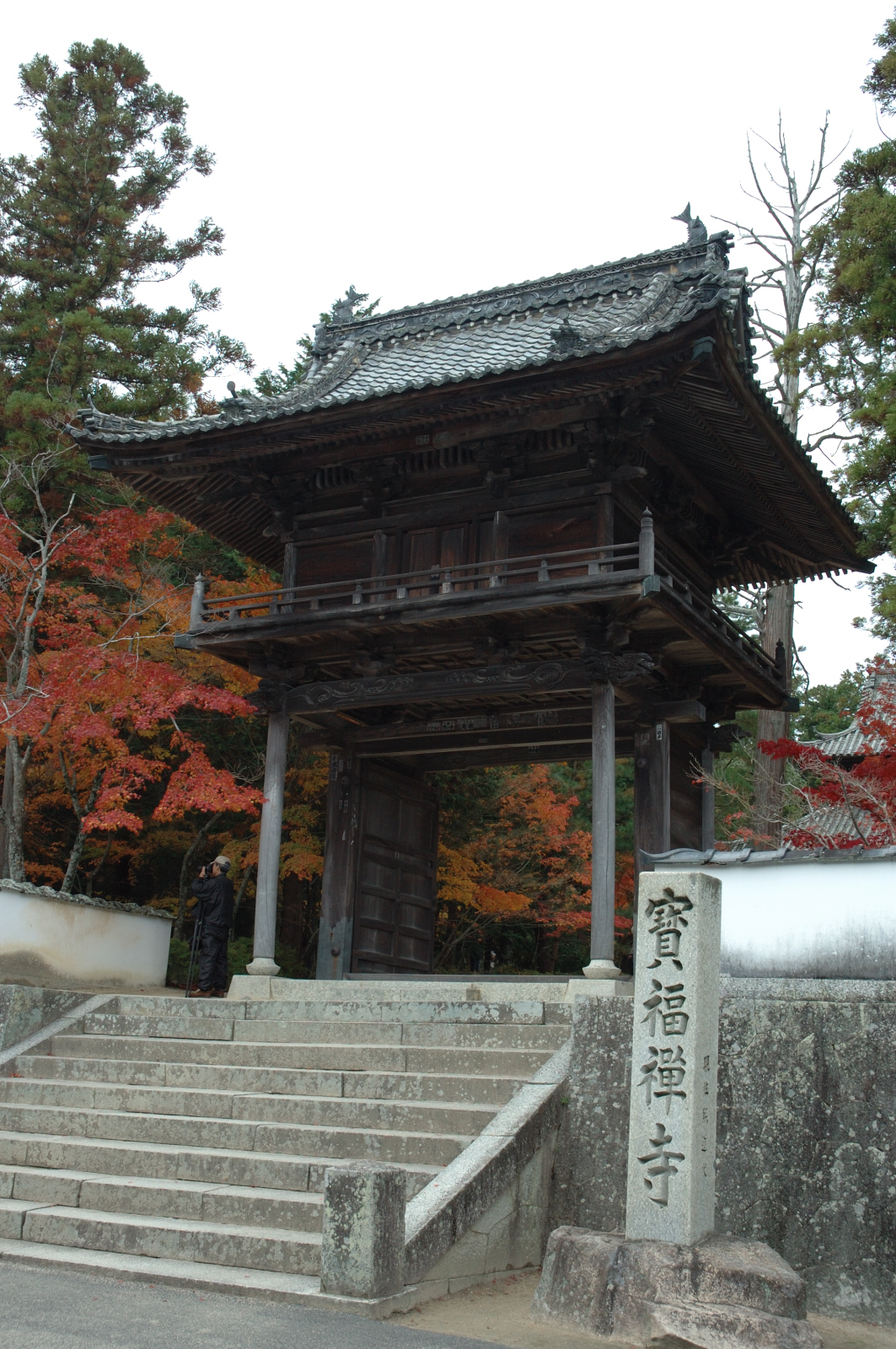
Sanmon

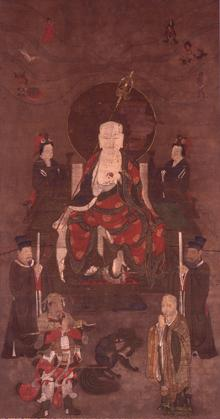
Jizō Bosatsu (ICP)

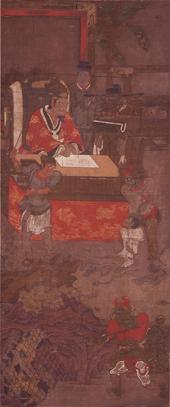
Ten Kings of Hell (ICP)

The temple is approximately eight minutes by car from JR West Sōja Station.

== Cultural Properties ==
=== National Important Cultural Properties ===
- Three-story Pagoda (三重塔), Nanboku-chō period; 18.47 meters. According to temple tradition, it was said to have been built in 1262 (Kōchō 2) through a donation from Hōjō Tokiyori, the regent of the Kamakura Shogunate. However, during dismantling and repair work in 1967, an ink inscription from 1376 (Eiwa 2) was discovered, confirming that it was actually built a little later, during the Nanboku-chō period. It is the second oldest three-storied pagoda in Okayama Prefecture.
- Painted silk painting of Jizo Bodhisattva (絹本著色地蔵菩薩像), Muromachi period.At the center is a statue of Jizo seated peacefully on a chair. In front of the Bodhisattva is a small crouching lion, and to its left and right are the Gushōjin (guardian deities who record good and evil) and the monk Dōmyō. Above the head are depictions of men and women, horses, hungry ghosts, etc., prominently displaying Jizo, the saver of the six realms.
- Painted silk painting of the Ten Kings of Hell (絹本著色十王像), Yuan dynasty, set of 10 scrolls

=== National Registered Tangible Cultural Properties ===
Almost all of the structures at Hōfuku-ji were built from the mid-Edo period to the Meiji period and 24 structures are Registered Tangible Cultural Properties. These include:

- Hōjō (abbot's quarters), late-Edo period
- Hōjō earthen wall, late-Edo period
- Entrance and dining hall, Bakumatsu period
- Kuri (monk's quarters), mid-Edo period
- Hōzō (treasure house), 1793
- Nakaido (middle well), late-Edo period
- Tenzoido (head cook's well), 1814
- Senjaku-i (thousand-foot well)
- Butsuden (Buddha hall), 1735
- Kyōzō (sutra repository), 1764
- Shōrō (bell tower), 1818
- Shoin (study), mid-Meiji period
- Zendō (Zen hall), 1814
- Sanmon (main gate), late Meiji period
- Sanmon stone wall and earthen wall, late Edo period
- Dokugibashi (wooden bridge), 1828
- Kaisandō (founder's hall), mid-Edo period
- Kaisandō front gate, 1806
- Kaisandō stone wall and earthen wall, 1806
- Akiba-gū Honden, mid-Meiji period
- Akiba-gū Haiden and connecting corridor, mid-Meiji period
- Akiba-gū Gosha Myojin-gū, 1892
- Akiba-gū Chōzuya, 1894
- Akiba-gū stone wall and stone fence, mid-Meiji period

=== Okayama Prefecture Designated Important Cultural Properties ===
- Bonshō (梵鐘), Muromachi period (1428). Height 117cm, diameter 59cm. Made of bronze. According to the inscription, this bell was cast for Kumayama Reizen-ji; it is unknown when it was brought to Hofuku-ji
- Hōfuku-ji Temple Documents (寳福寺文書), Nanboku-chō to Meiji period; Set of 13 documents dated from 1361 to 1648. They include regulations concerning Hōfuku-ji Temple and its sub-temples during the Nanboku-chō period, and a petition for repairs related to the restoration of Hōfuku-ji Temple in the early Edo period. They also include a rare surviving example of calligraphy by the renowned Zen monk Mumu Issei of the Nanboku-chō period. Now kept at the Okayama Prefectural Museum

== See also ==
- List of Historic Sites of Japan (Okayama)
