= Kujō Yoritsune =

Military ruler of Japan from 1226 to 1244

Senior Second Rank Fujiwara no Yoritsune
- 藤原 頼経
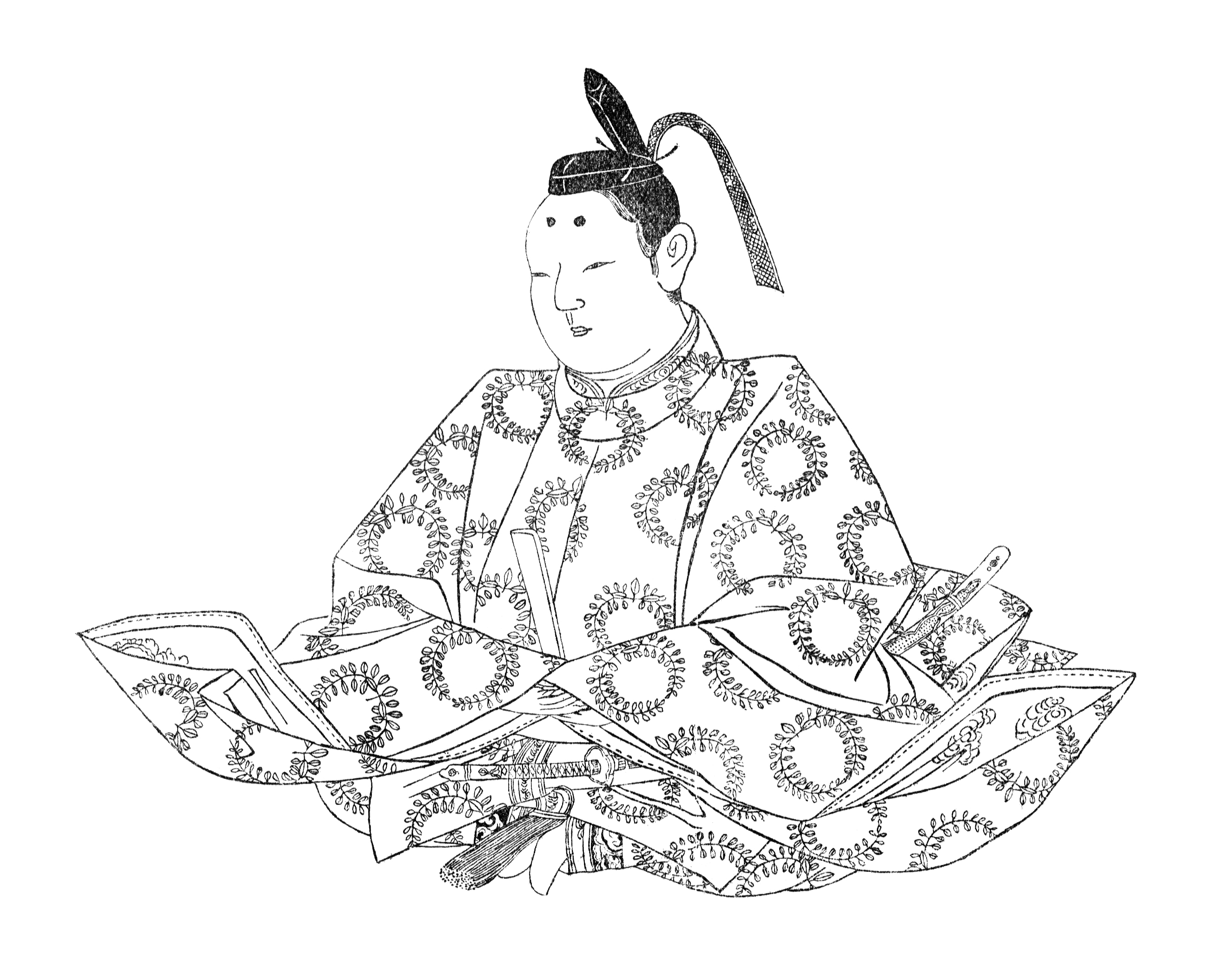

Shōgun
- In office 25 February 1226 – 5 June 1244
- Monarchs: Go-Horikawa; Shijō; Go-Saga
- Shikken: Hōjō Yasutoki; Hōjō Tsunetoki
- Preceded by: Minamoto no Sanetomo
- Succeeded by: Fujiwara no Yoritsugu

Personal details
- Born: 12 February 1218 Kyoto, Japan
- Died: 1 September 1256 (aged 38) Kyoto, Japan
- Spouse: Take no gosho
- Children: Fujiwara no Yoritsugu; Dōzō; Genne; Otowakamaru?
- Parents: Kujō Michiie (father); Saionji Rinshi (mother)
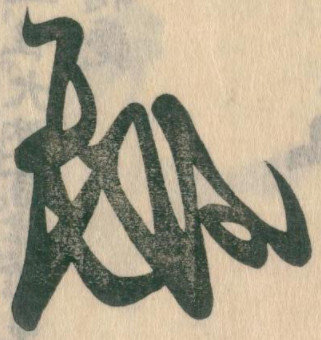
- Signature

Kujō Yoritsune (九条 頼経; 12 February 1218 – 1 September 1256, r. 1226–1244), also known as Fujiwara no Yoritsune (藤原 頼経), was the fourth shōgun of the Kamakura shogunate of Japan. His father was kanpaku Kujō Michiie and his grandmother was a niece of Minamoto no Yoritomo. His wife was a granddaughter of Yoritomo and daughter of Minamoto no Yoriie. He was born in the year, month and on the day (according to Chinese astrology) of the Tiger, and so was given the birth name Mitora (三寅, "Triple Tiger").

The Kujō family was one of the five branches of the historically powerful Fujiwara clan of courtiers.

== Family ==
- Father: Kujō Michiie
- Mother: Saionji Rinko
- Wife: Minamoto no Yoshiko (1202–1234)
- Concubine: Omiya no Tsubone
- Children:
  - Kujō Yoritsugu by Omiya
  - Kujō Michijo by Omiya
  - Minamoto no Meguhime by Omiya

== Events of Yoritsune's bakufu ==
At the age of seven, in 1226, Yoritsune became Sei-i Taishōgun in a political deal between his father and the Kamakura shogunate regent Hōjō Yoshitoki and Hōjō Masako who set him up as a puppet shogun.

- 1225 (Karoku 1, 11th month): At Kamakura, Yoritsune's coming of age ceremonies took place at age 8; but control of all bakufu affairs remained entirely in the hands of Hōjō Yasutoki, the regent (shikken).
- 25 February 1226 (Karoku 2, 27th day of the 1st month): Emperor Go-Horikawa raised Yoritsune to the first rank of the fifth class in the apex of artistocratic court hierarchy (the dōjō kuge).
- 1230 (Kangi 2, 12th month): Yoritsune is married to the daughter of Minamoto no Yoriie. She is 15 years older than he is.
- 1231 (Kangi 3, 2nd month): Yoritsune is raised to the second rank of the 4th class in the dōjō kuge.
- 1231 (Kangi 3, 3rd month): Yoritsune is created a general of the left.
- 1231 (Kangi 3, 4th month): Yoritsune is raised to the first rank of the 4th class in the dōjō kuge.
- 20 March 1232 (Jōei 1, 27th day of the 2nd month): Yoritsune is raised to the second rank of the 3rd class in the dōjō kuge.
- 1233 (Tenpuku 1, 1st month): Yoritsune is granted the court post of provisional Middle Counselor (中納言, Chūnagon)
- 1234 (Bunryaku 1, 12th month): Yoritsune is raised to the first rank of the 3rd class in the dōjō kuge.
- 1235 (Katei 1, 11th month): Yoritsune is raised to the second rank of the second class in the dōjō kuge.
- 23 August 1236 (Katei 2, 20th day of the 7th month): Yoritsune is raised to the first rank of the second class in the dōjō kuge.
- 1237 (Katei 3, 8th month): Yoritsune ordered the building of a mansion in the Rokuhara section of Miyako.
- 1238 (Ryakunin 1, 1st month): Yoritsune leaves Kamakura en route to Miyako, accompanied by Yaskutoki and the troupes of several provinces. Fujiwara no Yukimitis stays at Kamakura to preserve order in the land.
- 1238 (Ryakunin 1, 2nd month): Yoritsune arrives in Miyako and begins to live in his new palace at Rokuhara.
- 1238 (Ryakunin 1, 10th month): Yoritsune leaves Miyako to return to Kamakura.
- 14 July 1242 (Ninji 3, 15th day of the 6th month): Hōjō Yasutoki died at age 60. From Gennin 1, or during 19 years, Yasutoki had been the regent or prime minister (shikken) of the Kamakura shogunate. Yasutoki's son, Hōjō Tsunetoki succeeded him as shikken, but Yoritsune himself took charge of the bakufu.
- 1244 (Kangen 2): In the spring of this year, a number of extraordinary phenomena in the skies over Kamakura troubled Yoritsune deeply.
- 1244 (Kangen 2, 4th month): Yoritsune's son, Yoritsugu, had his coming-of-age ceremonies at age 6. In the same month, Yoritsune asked Emperor Go-Saga for permission to give up his responsibilities as shogun in favor of his son, Kujō Yoritsugu.
- 11 September 1245 (Kangen 3, 7th month): Yoshitsune shaved his head and became a Buddhist priest.
- 1246 (Kangen 4, 7th month): Yoritsune's son, now Shogun Yoritsugu marries the sister of Hōjō Tsunetoki.
- 1 September 1256 (Kōgen 1, 11th day of the 8th month): Kujō Yoritsune, also known as Fujiwara Yoritsune, dies at the age of 38.
- 14 October 1256 (Kōgen 1, 24th day of the 9th month): Yoritsune's son and successor as Kamakura shogun, Fujiwara Yoritsugu, dies at the age of 16.

== Eras of Yoritsune's bakufu ==
The years in which Yoritsune was shogun are more specifically identified by more than one era name or nengō.

- Karoku (1225–1227)
- Antei (1227–1229)
- Kangi (1229–1232)
- Jōei (1232–1233)
- Tenpuku (1233–1234)
- Bunryaku (1234–1235)
- Katei (1235–1238)
- Ryakunin (1238–1239)
- En'ō (1239–1240)
- Ninji (1240–1243)
- Kangen (1243–1247)

== Notes ==
Preceded by Minamoto no Sanetomo	Shōgun: Kujō Yoritsune; 1226–1244	Succeeded by Kujō Yoritsugu
