= Princess Teruko =

Princess Teruko 曦子内親王

Empress consort of Japan
- Tenure: 8 August 1248 – 19 April 1251
- Born: 1224
- Died: 5 October 1262 (aged 37–38)
- House: Imperial House of Japan
- Mother: Omiya-no-Tsubone

Princess Teruko (曦子内親王; 1224 – 5 October 1262) later known as Senkamon-in (仙華門院), was an Empress of Japan during the Kamakura period. She was empress (皇后; kogo) as the honorary mother (准母; junbo) of her nephew Emperor Go-Saga.

She was the daughter of Emperor Tsuchimikado and court lady Omiya-no-Tsubone (大宮局).

== Notes ==
Japanese royalty
Preceded by Fujiwara no Kitsushi	Empress consort of Japan; 1248–1251	Succeeded by Fujiwara no Kimiko
