= Ninji =

Period of Japanese history (1240–1243 CE)

Ninji (仁治), also called Jinji, was a Japanese era name (年号, nengō; lit. "year name") after En'ō and before Kangen. This period spanned the years from August 1240 to January 1243. The reigning emperors were Shijō-tennō (四条天皇) and Go-Saga-tennō (後嵯峨天皇).

== Change of era ==
- 1240 Ninji gannen (仁治元年): The era name was changed to mark an event or a number of events. The previous era ended and a new one commenced in En'ō 2.

== Events of the Ninji era ==
- 1242 (Ninji 3, 10th day of the 1st month): In the 10th year of Shijō-tennō's reign (四条天皇10年), the emperor died suddenly; and despite a dispute over who should follow him as sovereign, contemporary scholars then construed that the succession (senso) was received by the second son of former Emperor Tsuchimikado.
- 1242 (Ninji 3, 5th month): Emperor Go-Saga is said to have acceded to the throne (sokui).
- July 14, 1242 (Ninji 3, 15th day of the 6th month): Hōjō Yasutoki died at age 60. From Gennin 1, or during 19 years, Yasutoki had been the regent or prime minister (shikken) of the Kamakura shogunate. Yasutoki's son, Hōjō Tsunetoki succeeded him as shikken, but Kujō Yoritsune himself took charge of the bakufu.

== Notes ==
Preceded by En'ō	Era or nengō Ninji; 1240–1243	Succeeded by Kangen
