= Kangen =

Period of Japanese history (1243–1247 CE)

Kangen (寛元) was a Japanese era name (年号, nengō; lit. "year name") after Ninji and before Hoji. This period spanned the years from February 1243 to February 1247. The reigning emperor was Go-Saga-tennō (後嵯峨天皇).

== Change of era ==
- Kangen gannen (寛元元年); 1243: The new era name was created to mark an event or a number of events. The previous era ended and a new one commenced in Ninji 4.

== Events of the Kangen era ==
- 1244 (Kangen 2): In the spring of this year, a number of extraordinary phenomena in the skies over Kamakura troubled Yoritsune deeply.
- 1244 (Kangen 2, 4th month): Yoritsune's son, Yoritsugu, had his coming-of-age ceremonies at age six. In the same month, Yoritsune asked Emperor Go-Saga for permission to give up his responsibilities as shōgun in favor of his son, Kujō Yoritsugu.
- September 11, 1245 (Kangen 3, 7th month): Yoshitsune shaved his head and became a Buddhist priest.
- 1246 (Kangen 4, 7th month): Yoritsune's son, now Shōgun Yoritsugu (who is only 7 years old) marries the sister of Hōjō Tsunetoki (who is himself only 16 years old).
- 1246 (Kangen 4): In the 4th year of Go-Saga-tennō's reign (後嵯峨天皇4年), he abdicated; and despite the succession (senso) was received by his 4-year-old son. Shortly thereafter, Emperor Go-Fukakusa is said to have acceded to the throne (sokui).

== Notes ==
| Preceded by Ninji | Era or nengō Kangen; 1243–1247 | Succeeded by Hōji |
