= Kujō Shunshi =

Kujō Shunshi 九条竴子

Empress consort of Japan
- Tenure: 2 March 1230 – 13 May 1233
- Born: 25 June 1209
- Died: 22 October 1233 (aged 24); Heian-kyō (Kyōto)
- Spouse: Emperor Go-Horikawa (m. 1230)
- Issue: Emperor Shijō; Princess Hoshi
- House: Imperial House of Japan
- Father: Kujō Michiie
- Mother: Saionji Rinshi

Kujō Shunshi (九条 竴子; 25 June 1209 – 22 October 1233) also known as Sohekimon-in (藻璧門院), was Empress of Japan as the consort of Emperor Go-Horikawa.

Upon her death, the court women moved her body to a separate room where she was dressed in Buddhist robes, head shaven and juzu placed in her hands.

Children:

- First son: Imperial Prince Mitsuhito (秀仁親王) (Emperor Shijō)
- Fourth daughter: Imperial Princess Hoshi (暤子内親王)

== Notes ==
Japanese royalty
| Preceded by Konoe Nagako | Empress consort of Japan; 1230–1233 | Succeeded by Princess Rishi |
