= Saionji Saneuji =

Japanese poet and nobleman (1194–1269)

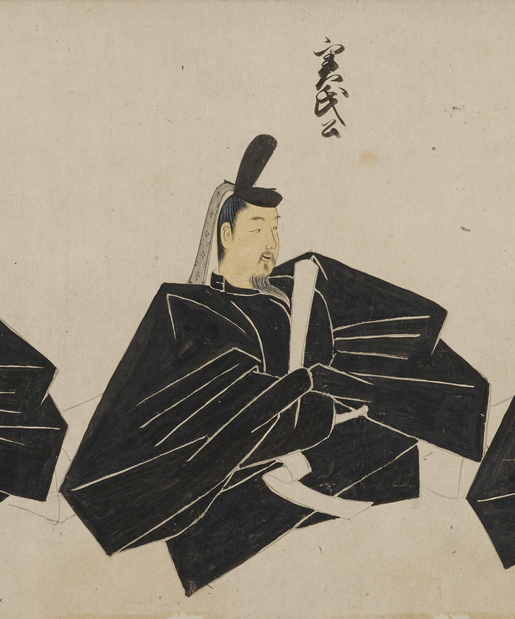

Saionji Saneuji (西園寺実氏 1194 – 7 July 1269) was a waka poet and Japanese nobleman active in the early Kamakura period. He is designated as a member of the New Thirty-Six Immortals of Poetry (新三十六歌仙, Shinsanjūrokkasen).

== Family ==
Parents

- Father: Saionji Kintsune (西園寺公経, 1171 – 24 October 1244)
- Mother: Ichijō Masako (一条全子), daughter of Ichijō Yoshiyasu (一条能保)

Consorts and issues:

- Wife: Shijō Sadako (四条貞子, 1196 – 22 October 1302) daughter of Shijo Takahira (四条隆衡)
  - Saionji Kisshi (西園寺 姞子; 1225 – 20 October 1292), Consort of Emperor Go-Saga, first daughter
  - Fujiwara no Kimiko (藤原（西園寺）公子; 1232 – 6 March 1304), Consort of Emperor Go-Fukakusa, second daughter
- Concubine: Fujiwara Sachiko (藤原幸子), daughter of Fujiwara Chika (藤原親雅)
  - Saionji Kinmoto (西園寺公基, 1220 – 12 January 1275), first son
- Concubine: Court Lady (家女房)
  - Saionji Kinsuke (西園寺公相, 1223 – 30 October 1267), second son
- Concubine: Unknown Concubine
  - Dōshō (道勝, d. 1273), third son
  - Dōya (道耀, 1234 – 1304), fourth son
  - Mamorusuke (守助, 1241 – 1295, fifth son
  - Saionji Norikō (西園寺教子), third daughter

== See also ==
- Saionji family
