= Bunryaku =

Period of Japanese history (1234–1235 CE)

Bunryaku (文暦), also romanized as Bunreki, was a Japanese era name (年号, nengō; lit. "year name") after Tenpuku and before Katei. This period spanned the years from November 1234 to September 1235. The reigning emperor was Shijō-tennō (四条天皇).

== Change of era ==
- 1234 Bunryaku gannen (文暦元年): The era name was changed to mark an event or a number of events. The previous era ended and a new one commenced in Tenpuku 2.

== Events of the Bunryaku Era ==
- 1234 (Bunryaku 1, 12th month): Kujō Yoritsune is raised to the first rank of the third class in the court hierarchy (the dōjō kuge).

== Notes ==
Preceded by Tenpuku	Era or nengō Bunryaku; 1234–1235	Succeeded by Katei
