= Fujiwara no Kimiko =

Saionji Kimiko 西園寺公子

Empress consort of Japan
- Tenure: 14 February 1257 – 6 January 1260
- Born: 1232
- Died: 6 March 1304 (aged 71–72); Heian-kyō (Kyōto)
- Spouse: Emperor Go-Fukakusa
- Issue: Princess Takako; Princess Reishi
- House: Imperial House of Japan
- Father: Saionji Saneuji
- Mother: Shijō Sadako

Fujiwara no Kimiko (藤原（西園寺）公子; 1232 – 6 March 1304) was Empress of Japan as the consort of Emperor Go-Fukakusa, her nephew. She was also known as Higashinijō‘in (東二条院).

In 1293 (first year of the Einin era) she ordained as a Buddhist nun.

Issue

- Second daughter: Imperial Princess Takako (貴子内親王)
- Third daughter: Imperial Princess Reishi (姈子内親王), wife of Emperor Go-Uda

== Notes ==
Japanese royalty
Preceded by Princess Teruko	Empress consort of Japan; 1257–1260	Succeeded by Fujiwara no Saneko
