= Kōgen =

Period of Japanese history (1256–1257 CE)

Kōgen (康元) was a Japanese era name (年号, nengō; lit. "year name") after Kenchō and before Shōka. This period spanned the years from October 1256 to March 1257. The reigning emperor was Go-Fukakusa-tennō (後深草天皇).

== Change of era ==
- 1256 Kōgen gannen (康元元年): The new era name was created to mark an event or a number of events. The previous era ended and a new one commenced in Kenchō 8.

== Events of the Kōgen era ==
- September 1, 1256 (Kōgen 1, 11th day of the 8th month): Kujō Yoritsune, also known as Fujiwara Yoritsune, died at the age of 39 years.
- October 14, 1256 (Kōgen 1, 24th day of the 9th month): Yoritsune's son and successor as Kamakura shōgun, Kujō Yoritsugu, also known as Fujiwara Yoritsugu, died at the age of 18 years.

== Notes ==
Preceded by Kenchō	Era or nengō Kōgen; 1256–1257	Succeeded by Shōka
