= Princess Rishi =

Princess Toshiko 利子内親王

Empress consort of Japan
- Tenure: 28 July 1233 – 9 December 1239
- Born: 1197
- Died: 25 January 1251 (aged 53–54); Heian-kyō (Kyōto)
- House: Imperial House of Japan
- Father: Imperial Prince Morisada
- Mother: Kitashirakawa-in

Princess Rishi (利子内親王; 1197 – 25 January 1251) was an Empress of Japan during the Kamakura period. She was empress as the honorary mother (准母; junbo) of her nephew, Emperor Shijō.

== Biography ==
She was the daughter of Imperial Prince Morisada (守貞親王; 1179-1223) and thus granddaughter of Emperor Takakura. She was the sister of Emperor Go-Horikawa and Princess Kuniko. In 1221, her brother became Emperor, and their sister Kuniko ceremoniously functioned as his Empress. In 1232, her nephew Emperor Shijō became Emperor, and Princess Rishi was appointed to be his Honorary Mother and elevated to the position of Empress, a ceremonious title which made it possible for the court to have an Empress maintaining the role and position of in court rituals until the Emperor married.

In 1239, she ordained as a Buddhist nun and given the Dharma name Shinseichi (真性智). On the same day she was bestowed the honorary title Shikiken Mon'in (式乾門院).

== Notes ==
Japanese royalty
Preceded by Fujiwara no Shunshi	Empress consort of Japan; 1233–1239	Succeeded by Fujiwara no Kitsushi
