= Tenpuku =

Period of Japanese history (1233–1234 CE)

Tenpuku (天福), also romanized as Tempuku, was a Japanese era name (年号, nengō, lit. "year name") after Jōei and before Bunryaku. This period spanned the years from April 1233 to November 1234. The reigning emperor was Shijō-tennō (四条天皇).

== Change of era ==
- 1233 Tenpuku gannen (天福元年): The era name was changed to mark an event or a number of events. The previous era ended and a new one commenced in Jōei 2.

== Events of the Tenpuku Era ==
- 1233 (Tenpuku 1, 1st month): Kujō Yoritsune is granted the court post of provisional Middle Counselor (中納言, Chūnagon)

== Notes ==
Preceded by Jōei	Era or nengō Tenpuku; 1233–1234	Succeeded by Bunryaku
