= Hōji (era) =

Period of Japanese history (1247–1249 CE)

Hōji (宝治) was a Japanese era name (年号, nengō; lit. "year name") after Kangen and before Kenchō. This period spanned the years from February 1247 to March 1249. The reigning emperor was Go-Fukakusa-tennō (後深草天皇,).

== Change of era ==
- 1247 Hōji gannen (宝治元年); 1247: The new era name was created to mark an event or a number of events. The previous era ended and a new one commenced in Kangen 5.

== Events of the Hōji era ==
- 1247 (Hōji 1): The Hōji conflict; Hōjō family destroyed the Miura family; and in so doing, the clan consolidated its authority as regents.

== Notes ==
Preceded by Ninji	Era or nengō Hōji; 1247–1249	Succeeded by Kenchō
