= Katei =

Period of Japanese history (1235–1238 CE)

Katei (嘉禎) was a Japanese era name (年号, nengō; lit. "year name") after Bunryaku and before Ryakunin. This period spanned the years from September 1235 to November 1238. The reigning emperor was Shijō-tennō (四条天皇).

== Change of era ==
- 1235 Katei gannen (嘉禎元年): The era name was changed to mark an event or a number of events. The previous era ended and a new one commenced in Bunryaku 2.

== Events of the Katei Era ==
- 1235 (Katei 1, 11th month): Kujō Yoritsune is raised to the second rank of the second class in the court hierarchy (the dōjō kuge).
- 1236 (Katei 2, 7th month): Yoritsune is raised to the first rank of the second class in the dōjō kuge.
- 1237 (Katei 3, 8th month): Yoritsune ordered the building of a mansion in the Rokuhara section of Kyoto.

== Notes ==
Preceded by Bunryaku	Era or nengō Katei; 1235–1238	Succeeded by Ryakunin
