= Princess Reishi (1270–1307) =

Princess Reishi 姈子内親王

Empress consort of Japan
- Tenure: 19 September 1285 – 5 September 1291
- Born: 5 October 1270; Heian-kyō (Kyōto)
- Died: 22 August 1307 (aged 36); Heian-kyō (Kyōto)
- Spouse: Emperor Go-Uda (m. 1285)
- House: Imperial House of Japan
- Father: Emperor Go-Fukakusa
- Mother: Fujiwara no Kimiko

Princess Reishi (姈子内親王; 5 October 1270 – 22 August 1307), later Yūgimon'in (遊義門院), was an Empress of Japan, married to her cousin Emperor Go-Uda. Go-Uda was known for his devotion to her.

She was the daughter of Emperor Go-Fukakusa and Fujiwara no Kimiko. She was named Empress to her cousin in 1285. By the time she was 30, her husband had retired from being Emperor, and around the same age she was given the name Yugimon-in.

in 1307, she became ill, and soon died, which affected her husband so deeply that he took Buddhist vows and became a devoted monk.

== Notes ==
Japanese royalty
Preceded by Fujiwara no Kishi	Empress consort of Japan; 1285–1291	Succeeded by Fujiwara no Shōshi
