= Hōjō Tokiuji =

Hōjō Tokiuji (北条 時氏, 1203 - July 29, 1230) was the eldest son and heir of Yasutoki, the third Shikken, and the father of Tsunetoki and Tokiyori.

Tokiuji was expected to be the future Shikken (regent) by his father, but he lost his health while he served as the Rokuhara Tandai (Kitakata) in Kyoto.

His wife Matsushita Zenni is known as a wise lady.

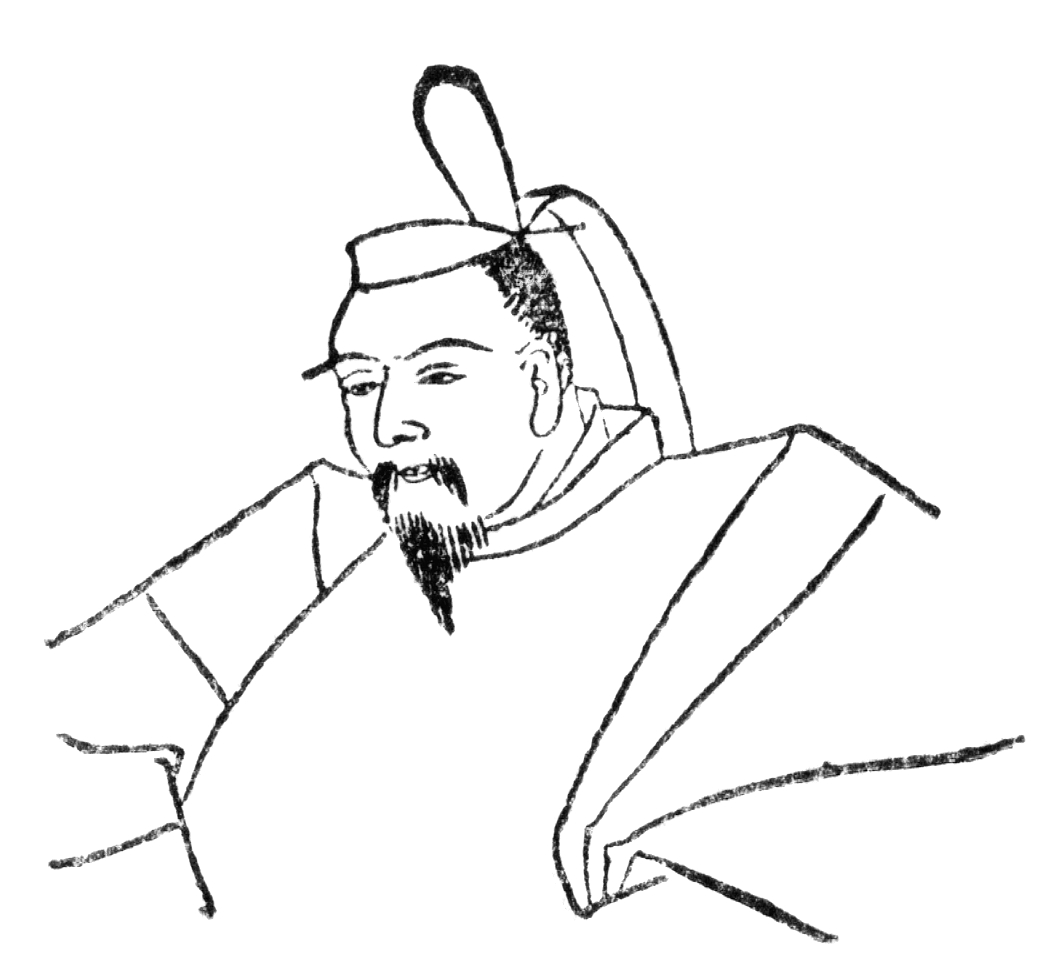
Sketch of Hōjō Tokiuji

Preceded by Hōjō Yasutoki	Rokuhara Tandai (Kitakata); 1224–1230	Succeeded by Hōjō Shigetoki
