= Saionji Kisshi =

Saionji Kisshi 西園寺姞子

Empress consort of Japan
- Tenure: 5 September 1242 – 10 July 1248
- Born: 1225
- Died: 20 October 1292 (aged 66–67); Heian-kyō (Kyōto)
- Spouse: Emperor Go-Saga (m. 1242; died 1272)
- Issue: Emperor Go-Fukakusa; Princess Osako; Emperor Kameyama; Prince Masataka; Prince Sadayoshi
- House: Imperial House of Japan
- Father: Saionji Saneuji
- Mother: Shijō Sadako

Saionji Kisshi (西園寺 姞子; 1225 – 20 October 1292) was Empress of Japan as the consort of Emperor Go-Saga. She was also known as Ōmiya-in (大宮院), her imperial title (ingō), and as Fujiwara no Kisshi (藤原 姞子), by her original clan name (honsei).

== Biography ==
She was the first daughter of Saionji Saneuji and Shijō Sadako.

Upon Emperor Go-Saga's passing, she was ordained as a Buddhist nun and received the Dharma name Henchikaku (遍智覚).

== Family ==
Issue:

  - Fourth son: Imperial Prince Hisahito (久仁親王) (Emperor Go-Fukakusa)
  - First daughter: Imperial Princess Osako (綜子内親王)
  - Seventh son: Imperial Prince Tsunehito (恒仁親王) (Emperor Kameyama)
  - Eleventh son: Imperial Prince Masataka (雅尊親王)
  - Thirteenth son: Imperial Prince Sadayoshi (貞良親王)

== Notes ==
Japanese royalty
Preceded by Princess Rishi	Empress consort of Japan; 1242–1248	Succeeded by Princess Teruko
