= Emperor Go-Fukakusa =

Emperor of Japan from 1246 to 1260

Emperor Go-Fukakusa 後深草天皇
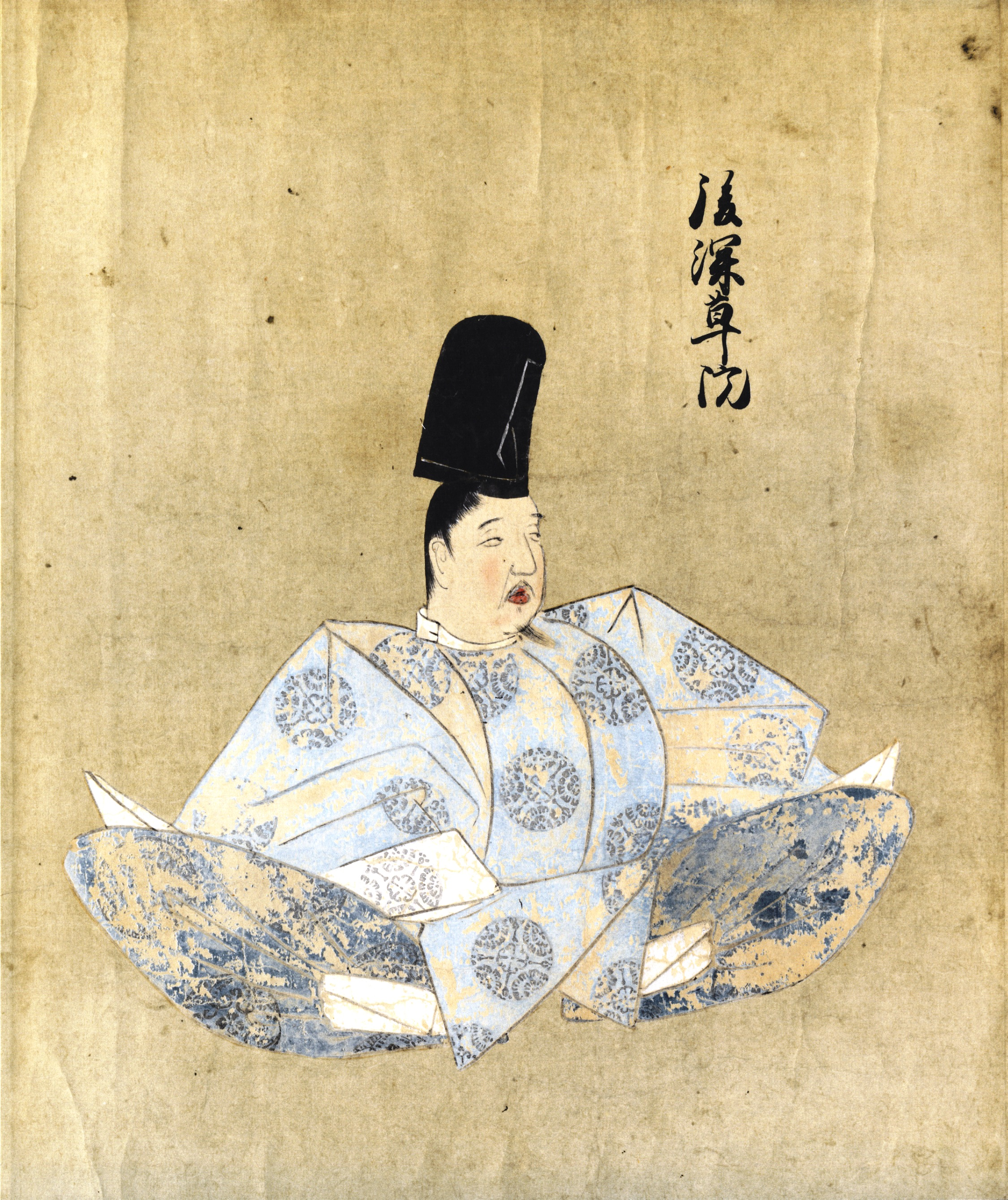
- Portrait from the Tenshi Sekkan Miei

Emperor of Japan
- Reign: 16 February 1246 – 9 January 1260
- Enthronement: 29 March 1246
- Predecessor: Go-Saga
- Successor: Kameyama
- Shōgun: Kujō Yoritsugu; Prince Munetaka
- Born: 28 June 1243; Imadegawa-dono (今出川殿), Heian kyō (Japan)
- Died: 17 August 1304 (aged 61); Nijo-Tominokoji-dono (二条富小路殿), Heian kyō
- Burial: Fukakusa no kita no Misasagi (深草北陵) (Kyoto)
- Spouse: Fujiwara no Kimiko
- Issue more...: Emperor Fushimi; Princess Reishi; Prince Hisaaki
Posthumous name
- Tsuigō: Emperor Go-Fukakusa (後深草院 or 後深草天皇)
- House: Imperial House of Japan
- Father: Emperor Go-Saga
- Mother: Fujiwara no Kitsushi
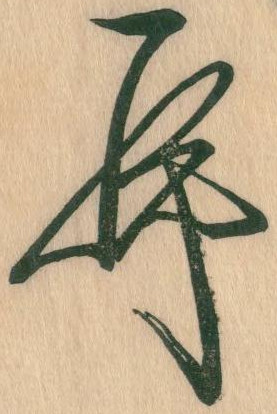
- Signature

Emperor Go-Fukakusa (後深草天皇, Go-Fukakusa-tennō; 28 June 1243 – 17 August 1304) was the 89th emperor of Japan, according to the traditional order of succession. This reign spanned the years 1246 through 1260.

This 13th-century sovereign was named after the 9th-century Emperor Ninmyō and go- (後), translates literally as "later", and thus he could be called the "Later Emperor Fukakusa". The Japanese word go has also been translated to mean the "second one"; and in some older sources, this emperor may be identified as "Fukakusa, the second", or as "Fukakusa II".

== Name ==
Before his ascension to the Chrysanthemum Throne, his personal name (his imina) was Hisahito (久仁).

Although the Roman-alphabet spelling of the name of this 13th-century emperor is the same as that of the personal name of a current member of the Imperial family, the kanji are different:

- Emperor Go-Fukakusa, formerly Prince Hisahito (久仁)
- Prince Hisahito of Akishino (悠仁)

He was the second son of Emperor Go-Saga.

== Issue ==
- Empress: Saionji (Fujiwara) Kimiko (西園寺（藤原）公子) later Higashinijō‘in (東二条院), Saionji Saneuji's daughter
  - Second daughter: Imperial Princess Takako (貴子内親王; 1262–1273)
  - Daughter (1265-1266)
  - Third daughter: Imperial Princess Reishi (姈子内親王; 1270–1307) later Yūgimon'in (遊義門院), married Emperor Go-Uda
- Consort: Tōin (Fujiwara) Inshi (洞院（藤原）愔子) later Genkimon-in (玄輝門院; 1246–1329), Tōin Saneo's daughter
  - Fourth daughter: Imperial Princess Hisako (久子内親王; 1272–1346) later Eiyōmon'in (永陽門院)
  - Second son: Imperial Prince Hirohito (熈仁親王) later Emperor Fushimi
  - Third son: Imperial Prince Mitsuhito (満仁親王) later Imperial Prince Priest Shonnin (性仁法親王; 1267–1304)
- Court Lady: Saionji (Fujiwara) Aiko (西園寺（藤原）相子), Saionji Kinsuke's daughter
  - Fifth daughter: Imperial Princess Hanako/Eiko/Akiko (瑛子内親王; 1288–1352) later Yōtokumon'in (陽徳門院)
- Court Lady: Saionji (Fujiwara) Moriko (西園寺（藤原）成子), Saionji Kintsune's daughter
  - First Son: Imperial Prince Tsunehito (常仁親王; d. 1264)
  - Fourth Son: Imperial Prince Yukihito (幸仁親王; 1269–1272)
- Court Lady: Sanjō (Fujiwara) Fusako (三条（藤原）房子), Sanjō Kinchika's daughter
  - Fifth son: Imperial Prince Priest Gyōkaku (行覚法親王; 1274–1293)
  - Seventh son: Imperial Prince Hisaaki (久明親王)
  - Ninth son: Imperial Prince Priest Sokaku (増覚法親王)
  - Sixth Daughter: Imperial Princess Eiko (永子内親王) later Shozenmon’in (章善門院; d. 1338)
- Court Lady: Miyoshi Tadako (三善忠子; d. 1299), Miyoshi Yasuhira's daughter
  - Sixth Son: Imperial Prince Priest Shinsho (深性法親王; 1275–1299)
- Court Lady: Bettō-Naishi (別当典侍), Takakura Shigemichi's daughter
  - Eighth Son: Imperial Prince Priest Kojo (恒助法親王; 1288–1310)
- Court Lady: Lady Nijō, Minamoto no Masatada's daughter
  - Prince (1273–1274)
- unknown
  - Prince (1263–1266)

== Political significance ==
When Go-Fukakusa ascended to the throne in 1246 at the age of four, his father Go-Saga continued to rule from his position of Retired Emperor. In 1260 Go-Saga forced Go-Fukakusa to abdicate in favor of Kameyama. Kameyama's son was named Crown Prince (later known as Emperor Go-Uda). Go-Fukakusa appealed to the shogunal administration in the city of Kamakura and had his own son (later known as Emperor Fushimi) named next in line after Go-Uda. During the reign of Go-Uda, Go-Fukakusa exerted power from the office of Retired Emperor. An agreement was reached by which the next emperors would alternate between descendants of Go-Fukakusa and descendants of Kameyama.

== Events of Go-Fukakusa's life ==
Hisahito-shinnō (imperial prince of a shinnōke) (久仁親王) formally became Go-Fukakusa-tennō (imperial emperor) (後深草天皇) at the age of 2; and Go-Saga began to exercise power as cloistered Emperor.

- 16 February 1246 (Kangen 4, 29th day of the 1st month): In the 4th year of Go-Saga-tennō's reign (後嵯峨天皇四年), he abdicated; and the succession (senso) was received by his 4-year-old son. Shortly thereafter, Emperor Go-Fukakusa is said to have acceded to the throne (sokui).

In 1259, at the insistence of Retired Emperor Go-Saga, he abdicated at the age of 15 to his younger brother, who would become Emperor Kameyama.

After Emperor Go-Uda's ascension in 1274, Saionji Sanekane negotiated with the Bakufu, and succeeded in getting Emperor Go-Fukakusa's son Hirohito named as Crown Prince. In 1287, with his ascension as Emperor Fushimi, Go-Fukakusa's cloistered rule began.

In 1290, he entered the priesthood, retiring from the position of cloistered Emperor. But, with his seventh son, Imperial Prince Hisaaki becoming the 8th Kamakura shōgun among other things, the position of his Jimyōin-tō became strengthened.

In 1304, he died. He is enshrined with other emperors at the imperial tomb called Fukakusa no kita no misasagi (深草北陵) in Fushimi-ku, Kyoto.

=== Kugyō ===
Kugyō (公卿) is a collective term for the very few most powerful men attached to the court of the Emperor of Japan in pre-Meiji eras. Even during those years in which the court's actual influence outside the palace walls was minimal, the hierarchic organization persisted.

In general, this elite group included only three to four men at a time. These were hereditary courtiers whose experience and background would have brought them to the pinnacle of a life's career. During Go-Fukakusa's reign, this apex of the Daijō-kan included:

- Sesshō, Ichijō Sanetsune, 1246–1247
- Sesshō, Konoe Kanetsune, 1247–1252
- Sesshō, Takatsukasa Kanehira, 1252–1254
- Kampaku, Takatsukasa Kanehira, 1254–1261
- Sadaijin
- Udaijin
- Nadaijin
- Dainagon

== Eras of Go-Fukakusa's reign ==
The years of Go-Fukakusa's reign are more specifically identified by more than one era name or nengō.

- Kangen (1243–1247)
- Hōji (1247–1249)
- Kenchō (1249–1257)
- Kōgen (1256–1257)
- Shōka (1257–1259)
- Shōgen (1259–1260)

== See also ==
- Emperor of Japan
- List of Emperors of Japan
- Imperial cult
- Prince Hisahito of Akishino

== Notes ==
Japanese Imperial kamon — a stylized chrysanthemum blossom

Regnal titles
Preceded by Emperor Go-Saga	Emperor of Japan: Go-Fukakusa; 1246–1260	Succeeded by Emperor Kameyama
