= En'ō =

Period of Japanese history (1239–1240 CE)

En'ō (延応) was a Japanese era name (年号, nengō; lit. "year name") after Ryakunin and before Ninji. This period spanned the years from February 1239 to July 1240. The reigning emperor was Shijō-tennō (四条天皇).

== Change of era ==
- 1239 En'ō gannen (延応元年): The era name was changed to mark an event or a number of events. The previous era ended and a new one commenced in Ryakunin 2.

== Events of the En'ō Era ==
- 1239 (En'ō 1, 1st month): The Daijo daijin Kujō Yoshihira (九条 良平) retired from worldly concerns, taking the tonsure of a Buddhist priest.
- 1239 (En'ō 1, 2nd month): Former Emperor Go-Toba died at age 60.

== Notes ==
Preceded by Ryakunin	Era or nengō En'ō; 1239–1240	Succeeded by Ninji
