= Ryakunin =

Period of Japanese history (1238–1239 CE)

Ryakunin (暦仁) was a Japanese era name (年号, nengō, lit. "year name") after Katei and before En'ō. This period spanned the years from November 1238 to April 1239. The reigning emperor was Shijō-tennō (四条天皇).

== Change of era ==
- 1238 Ryakunin gannen (暦仁元年): The era name was changed to mark an event or a number of events. The previous era ended and a new one commenced in Katei 4.

== Events of the Ryakunin Era ==
- 1238 (Ryakunin 1, 1st month): Yoritsune leaves Kamakura en route to Miyako, accompanied by Yaskutoki and the troupes of several provinces. Fujiwara no Yukimitis stays at Kamakura to preserve order in the land.
- 1238 (Ryakunin 1, 2nd month): Yoritsune arrives in Miyako and begins to live in his new palace at Rokuhara.
- 1238 (Ryakunin 1, 10th month): Yoritsune leaves Miyako to return to Kamakura.

== Notes ==
Preceded by Katei	Era or nengō Ryakunin; 1238–1239	Succeeded by En'ō
