= Hōjō Tsunetoki =

4th Shikken of the Kamakura shogunate

Hōjō Tsunetoki 北条 経時
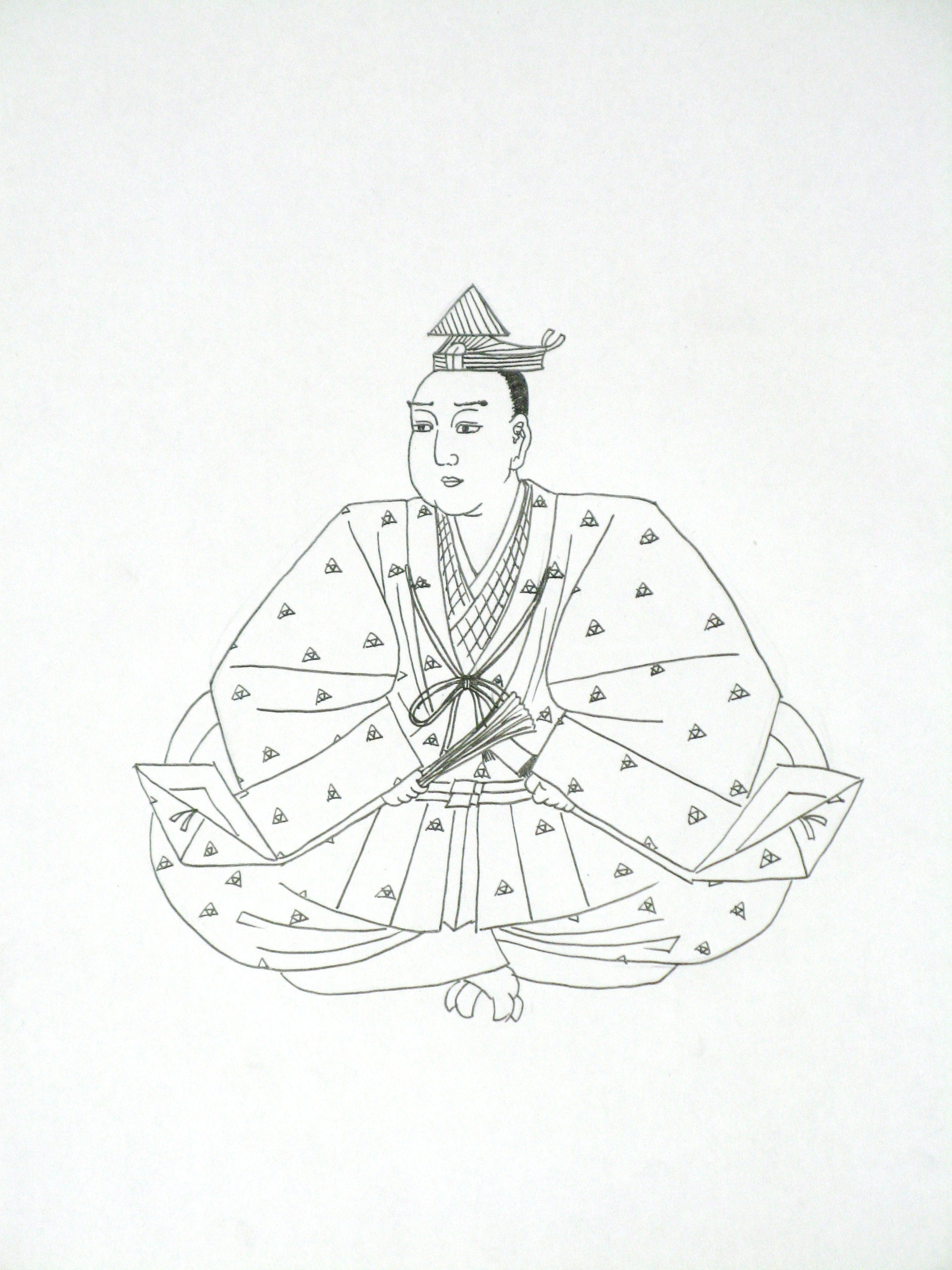
- Portrait of Hōjō Tsunetoki

Shikken
- In office 1242–1246
- Monarch: Go-Saga
- Shōgun: Fujiwara no Yoritsune; Fujiwara no Yoritsugu
- Preceded by: Hōjō Yasutoki
- Succeeded by: Hōjō Tokiyori

Personal details
- Born: 1224
- Died: May 17, 1246
- Spouse: daughter of Utsunomiya Yasutsuna
- Children: Ryūsei; Raijo
- Parents: Hōjō Tokiuji (father); Matsushita Zenni (mother)

Hōjō Tsunetoki (北条 経時; 1224 – May 17, 1246) was the fourth Shikken (1242–1246) of the Kamakura shogunate. He was son of warrior monk Hōjō Tokiuji and a daughter of Adachi Kagemori, elder brother of Hōjō Tokiyori, and grandson of Hōjō Yasutoki. He ruled from 1242 to 1246 and founded Kōmyō-ji in Zaimokuza. He is buried within the temple.

== See also ==
- Tokusō, head of Hōjō clan

| Preceded by Hōjō Yasutoki | Hōjō Regent; 1242–1246 | Succeeded by Hōjō Tokiyori |
| Preceded by Hōjō Yasutoki | Tokusō; 1242–1246 | Succeeded by Hōjō Tokiyori |
