= Kangi =

Period of Japanese history (1229–1232 CE)

Kangi (寛喜), also romanized as Kanki, was a Japanese era name (年号, nengō; lit. "year name") after Antei and before Joei. This period spanned the years from March 1229 to April 1232. The reigning emperor was Go-Horikawa-tennō (後堀河天皇).

== Change of era ==
- 1229 Kangi gannen (寛喜元年): The era name was changed to mark an event or a number of events. The previous era ended and a new one commenced in Antei 3.

== Events of the Kangi era ==
- 1230 (Kangi 2, 12th month): Kujō Yoritsune is married to the daughter of Minamoto no Yoriie. She is 15 years older than he is.
- 1231 (Kangi 3, 2nd month): Yoritsune is raised to the second rank of the 4th class in the dōjō kuge.
- 1231 (Kangi 3, 3rd month): Yoritsune is created a general of the left.
- 1231 (Kangi 3, 4th month): Yoritsune is raised to the first rank of the 4th class in the dōjō kuge.

== The Kangi Famine (1229–1232) ==
"Between 1229 and 1232, the Kanki famine struck. Possibly the worst famine in Japanese history, it was caused by unusually cold, damp weather related to world-wide volcanic activity. The weather was so severe that snow fell in central Japan in the summer of 1230, while aristocrats noted days when the sun did not shine and complained because they had to wear heavy clothing even in the spring and summer. The death toll was high—in 1231, in one estate in central Japan about twenty percent of cultivators died in less than a month.

Both governments attempted to ameliorate the harsh conditions but to little avail. Law and order broke down; countermeasures against nocturnal marauders and “evil monks” were largely ineffectual. Outlawry even affected relations with the Korean kingdom of Koryō when hungry residents of Kyushu raided the neigh boring peninsula for food. The famine also led to numerous quarrels between on-site warrior landlords and urban proprietors, with many estates unable to pay taxes or organize labor gangs. When harvests were inadequate, warriors also pressured and abused hapless cultivators, driving them from their fields. Both Kyoto and Kamakura took steps to make more grain available to commoners, but the results of their actions were only modest.

The most important countermeasure taken to try to reduce the impact of the lengthy crop failure was the legalization of the sale of human beings. When a family was faced with starvation, members might choose to sell children or other kin in return for grain, at the same time ensuring enough to eat for the sellers and the person to be sold. This behavior had been going on illegally for centuries, but its official authorization from 1231 to 1239 showed just how severe the Kangi famine was. The policy helped to spread starving victims around to people who could take care of them, but it also ripped more families asunder.

In addition, all those sold became members of a servile class, dwelling in small lean-tos or perhaps even in a room of their master's house. These conditions did not encourage large. stable families. The new policy may have saved some lives, but the creation of so many dependent, broken, and poor families helped lower fertility, making recovery from the famine even more difficult. After the famine in 1239, the bakufu tried to abrogate the more lenient laws, without success. The famine expanded the size of the servile class considerably; it was to remain a significant proportion of Japanese society for the next four hundred years[ ... ]"

== Notes ==
Preceded by Antei	Era or nengō Kangi; 1229–1232	Succeeded by Jōei
