= Kenchō =

Period of Japanese history (1249–1256 CE)

Kenchō (建長) was a Japanese era name (年号, nengō, lit. "year name") after Hōji and before Kōgen. This period spanned the years from March 1249 to October 1256. The reigning emperor was Go-Fukakusa-tennō (後深草天皇).

== Change of era ==
- 1249 Kenchō gannen (建長元年): The new era name was created to mark an event or a number of events. The previous era ended and a new one commenced in Hōji 3.

== Events of the Kenchō era ==
- 1253 (Kenchō 5): Kenchō-ji founded.

== Notes ==
Preceded by Hōji	Era or nengō Kenchō; 1249–1256	Succeeded by Kōgen
