= Hōjō Yasutoki =

Shikken (regent) of the Kamakura shogunate in Japan (1183–1242)

Hōjō Yasutoki 北条 泰時
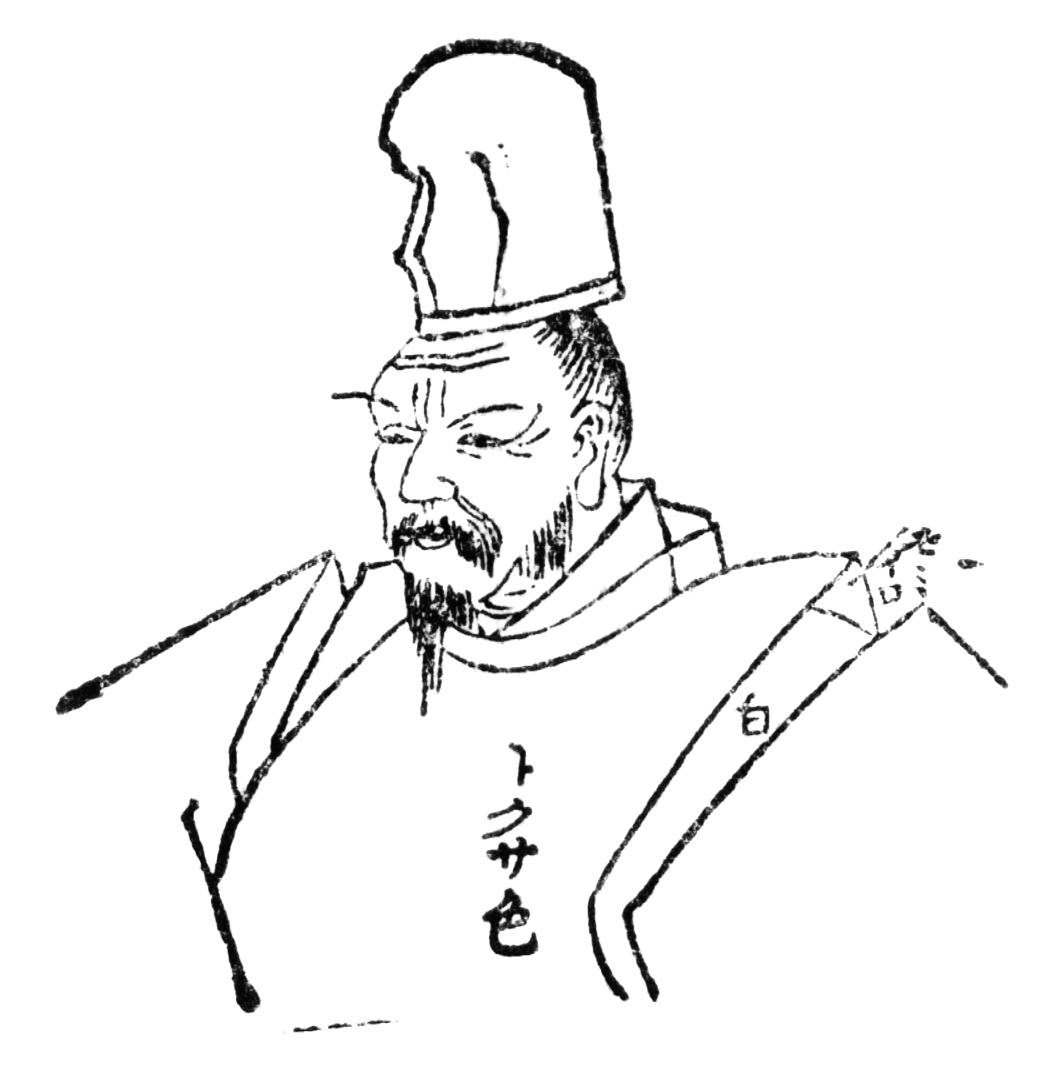

Shikken
- In office 1224–1242
- Monarchs: Go-Horikawa; Shijō
- Shōgun: Fujiwara no Yoritsune
- Rensho: Hōjō Tokifusa
- Preceded by: Hōjō Yoshitoki
- Succeeded by: Hōjō Tsunetoki

Personal details
- Born: 1183
- Died: July 14, 1242
- Spouse(s): Yabe Zenni daughter of Abo Sanekazu
- Children: Hōjō Tokiuji; Hōjō Tokizane; three other daughters
- Parents: Hōjō Yoshitoki (father); Awa no Tsubone (mother)

Hōjō Yasutoki (北条 泰時; 1183 – July 14, 1242) was the third shikken (regent) of the Kamakura shogunate in Japan. He strengthened the political system of the Hōjō regency.

== Life ==
He was the eldest son of second shikken Hōjō Yoshitoki. According to Azuma Kagami, he was liked by the first shōgun, Minamoto no Yoritomo. In 1218, he became the chief (bettō) of the Board of Retainers (samurai-dokoro).

In the Jōkyū War of 1221, he led shogunate forces against the imperial court in Kyoto. After his victory, he remained in Kyoto and set up the Rokuhara Tandai. Yasutoki and his uncle Tokifusa became the first tandai.

When his father Yoshitoki and aunt Hōjō Masako died, he succeeded to become shikken in 1224. He installed Hōjō Tokifusa as the first rensho. In 1225 he created the Hyōjō (評定), the council system of the shogunate. In 1232 he promulgated the Goseibai Shikimoku, the legal code of the shogunate. He was highly praised for his impartial justice.

In 1242, he was ordained as a Buddhist monk and took the Dharma name Jōshōbō Kan'a (上聖房観阿).

He died in the same year. His grandson Tsunetoki succeeded him to the post of shikken.

Preceded by Hōjō Yoshitoki	Hōjō Regent; 1224–1242	Succeeded by Hōjō Tsunetoki
Preceded by Hōjō Yoshitoki	Tokusō; 1224–1242	Succeeded by Hōjō Tsunetoki
Preceded by (none)	Rokuhara Tandai (Kitakata); 1221–1224	Succeeded by Hōjō Tokiuji
