= Jōei =

Period of Japanese history (1232–1233 CE)

Jōei (貞永) was a Japanese era name (年号, nengō; lit. "year name") after Kangi and before Tenpuku. This period spanned the years from April 1232 to April 1233. The reigning emperors were Go-Horikawa-tennō (後堀河天皇) and Shijō-tennō (四条天皇).

== Change of era ==
- 1232 Jōei gannen (貞永元年): The era name was changed to mark an event or a number of events. The previous era ended and a new one commenced in Kangi 4.

== Events of the Jōei Era ==
- 1232 (Jōei 1, i2nd month): Kujō Yoritsune is raised to the second rank of the 3rd class in the dōjō kuge.
- 1232 (Jōei 1, 11th month): In the 11th year of Emperor Go-Horikawa's reign (後堀河天皇11年), he abdicated; and the succession (senso) was received by his oldest son. Shortly thereafter, Emperor Shijō is said to have acceded to the throne (sokui).

== Notes ==
Preceded by Kangi	Era or nengō Jōei; 1232–1233	Succeeded by Tenpuku
