= Emperor Go-Saga =

Emperor of Japan from 1242 to 1246

Emperor Go-Saga 後嵯峨天皇
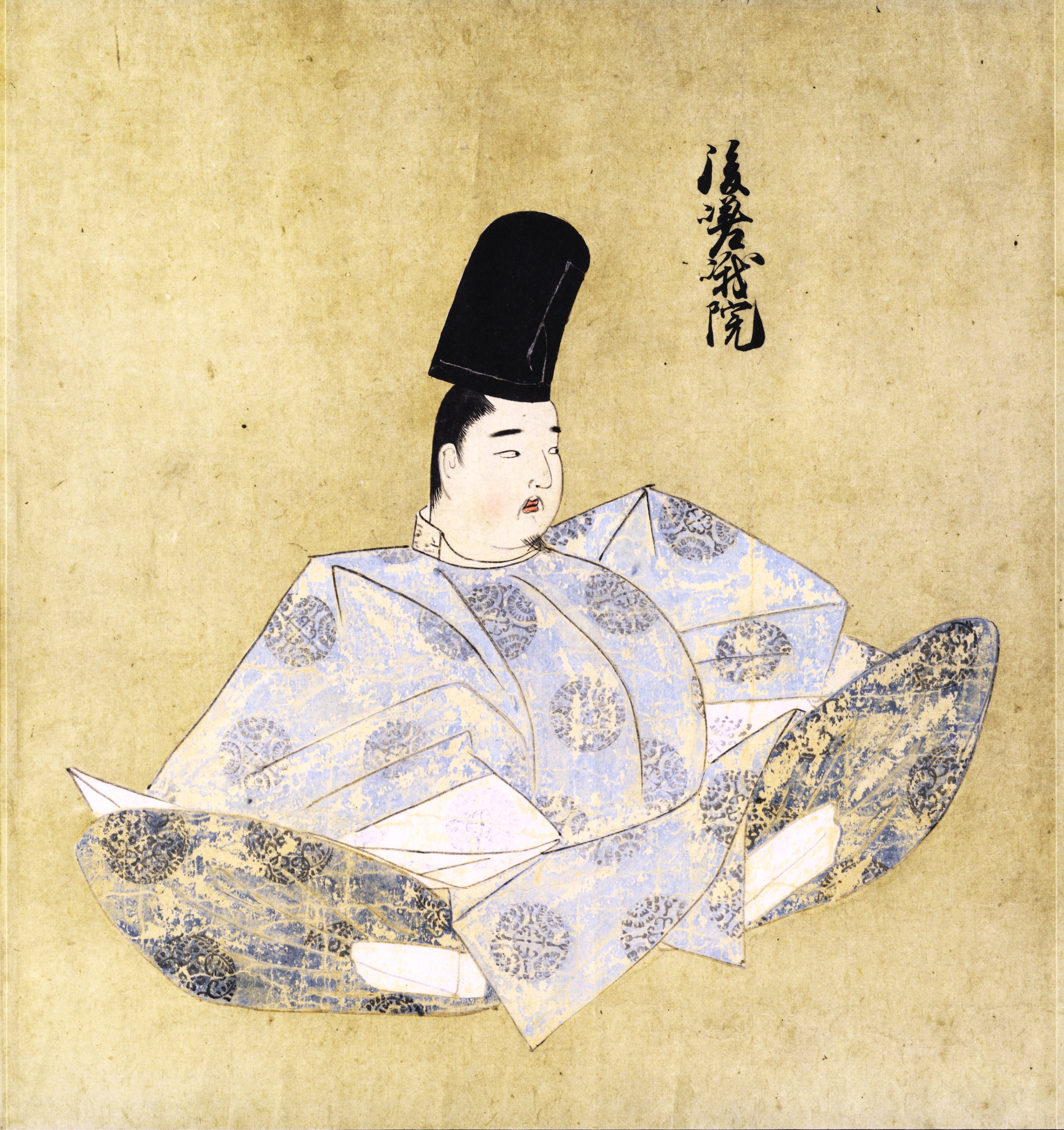
- Portrait from the Tenshi Sekkan Miei

Emperor of Japan
- Reign: 21 February 1242 – 16 February 1246
- Enthronement: 19 April 1242
- Predecessor: Shijō
- Successor: Go-Fukakusa
- Shōgun: Kujō Yoritsune; Kujō Yoritsugu
- Born: 1 April 1220
- Died: 17 March 1272 (aged 51); Daikaku-ji (大覚寺), Heian-kyō
- Burial: Saga no minami no Misasagi (嵯峨南陵) (Kyoto)
- Spouse: Fujiwara no Kitsushi (m. 1242)
- Issue more...: Emperor Go-Fukakusa; Emperor Kameyama; Prince Munetaka
Posthumous name
- Tsuigō: Emperor Go-Saga (後嵯峨院 or 後嵯峨天皇)
- House: Imperial House of Japan
- Father: Emperor Tsuchimikado
- Mother: Minamoto no Michiko

Emperor Go-Saga (後嵯峨天皇, Go-Saga-tennō; 1 April 1220 – 17 March 1272) was the 88th emperor of Japan, according to the traditional order of succession. This reign spanned the years 1242 through 1246.

This 13th-century sovereign was named after the 9th-century Emperor Saga and go- (後), translates literally as "later"; and thus, he is sometimes called the "Later Emperor Saga". The Japanese word go has also been translated to mean the second one; and in some older sources, this emperor may be identified as Saga, the second, or as Saga II.

== Genealogy ==
Before his ascension to the Chrysanthemum Throne, his personal name (his imina) was Kunihito-shinnō (邦仁親王).

He was the second son of Emperor Tsuchimikado, and second cousin of his predecessor Emperor Shijō.

- Empress: Saionji (Fujiwara) no Yoshi-ko (西園寺（藤原）姞子) Later Ōmiya-in (大宮院), Saionji Saneuji’s daughter
  - Fourth son: Imperial Prince Hisahito (久仁親王) later Emperor Go-Fukakusa
  - First daughter: Imperial Princess Osako (綜子内親王; 1247-1269）later Gekkamon-in (月華門院)
  - Seventh son: Imperial Prince Tsunehito (恒仁親王) later Emperor Kameyama
  - Eleventh son: Imperial Prince Masataka (雅尊親王; 1254-1256)
  - Thirteenth son: Imperial Prince Sadayoshi (貞良親王; 1256-1260)
  - Princess (b.1260)
- Consort: Imperial Princess Taishi (体子内親王; 1231-1302) later Shinsenmon’in (神仙門院), Emperor Go-Horikawa’s daughter
  - Princess (d.1281)
- Court Lady: Saionji (Fujiwara) Kimiko (西園寺（藤原）公子), Saionji Kintsune's daughter
  - Son: Imperial Prince Priest jijo (慈助法親王; 1254-1295）
  - Daughter: Imperial Princess Etsuko (悦子内親王; 1260-1332）later Enseimon’in (延政門院)
- Lady-in-waiting: Taira no Muneko (平棟子), Taira no Munemoto's daughter
  - Third son: Imperial Prince Munetaka (宗尊親王)
- Handmaid?: Fujiwara Hiroko (藤原博子), Fujiwara Takatoki's daughter
  - Eighth son: Imperial Prince Priest Kakujo (覚助法親王; 1247-1336)
  - Princess
  - Sixth daughter: Imperial Princess Ekishi (懌子内親王; 1262-1294) later Gojo’in (五条院)
- Court Lady: Fujiwara Fujiko (藤原藤子), Shijo Takahira's daughter
  - Son: Imperial Prince Priest Saijo (最助法親王; 1253-1293）
- Court Lady: Mikushige-dono (御匣殿), Sanjo Kinfusa's daughter
  - Son: Imperial Prince Priest Chujo (忠助法親王; d.1290)
  - Sixth Son: Imperial Prince Priest Shōjo (性助法親王; 1247-1282）
- Court Lady: Anegakoji Saneyo's daughter
  - Son: Imperial Prince Priest Jōjo (浄助法親王; 1253-1280）
- Court Lady: Emontoku-no-tsubone (右衛門督局), Ichijo Yoshiyasu's daughter
  - Son: Imperial Prince Priest Enjo (円助法親王; 1236-1282）
- Court Lady: Nijo-no-Tsubone (二条局), Fujiwara Toshimori's daughter
  - Second Daughter: Imperial Princess Yasuko (愷子内親王; 1249-1284）
- Court Lady: Ichijo-dono-no-tsubone (一条殿局), Fujiwara no Kanefusa’s daughter
  - Son: Imperial Prince Priest Nin’e (仁恵法親王; 1244-1298）
- Court Lady: Dainagon-no-Tsubone (大納言局), Nakanoin Michikata's daughter
  - Prince (1243)
- Court Lady: Kujō Yoshihira's daughter
- Court Lady: Minamoto no Yorimasa's granddaughter
  - Priest Shojo
- Court Lady: Fujiwara clan's descendant
  - Second Son: Kōhō Ken'nichi (高峰顕日; 1241-1316)

== Events of Go-Saga's life ==
He ruled from 21 February 1242, to 16 February 1246.

When Emperor Tsuchimikado moved to Tosa Province (on Shikoku), he was raised by his mother's side of the family.

Because of the sudden death of Emperor Shijō at the age of 10, the question of succession arose. Because the expectations of the court nobility and the Bakufu conflicted, the issue was bitterly contested. Kujō Michiie and the court nobility initially supported Prince Tadanari (忠成王), a son of Retired Emperor Juntoku, but the shikken Hōjō Yasutoki was opposed to the sons of Juntoku because of his involvement in the Jōkyū War. Michiie then instead supported Tsuchimikado's son Prince Kunihito as a neutral figure for Emperor. During these negotiations, there was a vacancy on the throne of 11 days.

- 11 February 1242 (Ninji 3, 10th day of the 1st month): In the 10th year of Shijō-tennō 's reign (四条天皇10年), the emperor died suddenly; and despite a dispute over who should follow him as sovereign, contemporary scholars then construed that the succession (senso) was received by the second son of former Emperor Tsuchimikado.
- 19 April 1242 (Ninji 3, 18th day of the 3rd month): Emperor Go-Saga is said to have acceded to the throne (sokui).

In 1242, Prince Kunihito became emperor. In 1246 he abdicated to his son, Emperor Go-Fukakusa, beginning his reign as cloistered emperor. In 1259, he compelled Emperor Go-Fukakusa to abdicate to his younger brother, Emperor Kameyama. Imperial Prince Munetaka became shōgun instead of the Hōjō regents. Henceforth, the shōguns of the Kamakura Bakufu came from the imperial house. Still, the Hōjō regents increased their control of the shogunate, setting up the system of rule by regents.

The descendants of his two sons contested the throne between them, forming into two lines, the Jimyōin-tō (Go-Fukakusa's descendants) and the Daikakuji-tō (Kameyama's descendants). Their lines would eventually lead to the split between the Northern and Southern Courts.

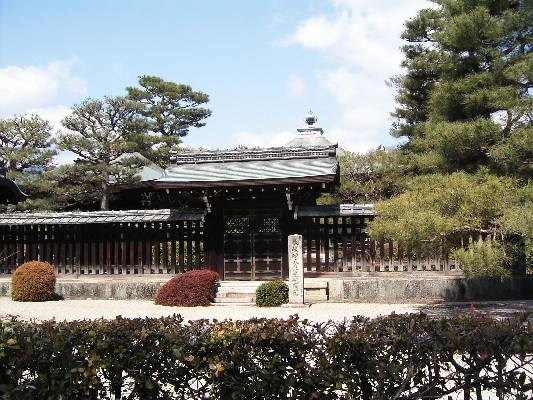
Memorial Shinto-Buddhist temple and mausoleum honoring Emperor Go-Saga

In 1272, Go-Saga died.

Go-Saga's final resting place is designated as an Imperial mausoleum (misasagi) at Saga no minami no Misasagi at Tenryū-ji in Kyoto.

== Kugyō ==
Kugyō (公卿) is a collective term for the very few most powerful men attached to the court of the Emperor of Japan in pre-Meiji eras. Even during those years in which the court's actual influence outside the palace walls was minimal, the hierarchic organization persisted.

In general, this elite group included only three to four men at a time. These were hereditary courtiers whose experience and background would have brought them to the pinnacle of a life's career. During Go-Saga's reign, this apex of the Daijō-kan included:

- Kampaku, Konoe Kanetsune, 1242
- Kampaku, Nijō Yoshizane, 1242–1246
- Kampaku, Ichijō Sanetsune, 1246
- Sadaijin
- Udaijin
- Nadaijin
- Dainagon

== Eras of Go-Saga's reign ==
The years of Go-saga's reign are more specifically identified by more than one era name or nengō.

- Ninji (1240–1243)
- Kangen (1243–1247)

== Ancestry ==
Ancestors of Emperor Go-Saga

8. Emperor Takakura (1161-1181)
4. Emperor Go-Toba (1180-1239)
9. Shichijō-in (Fujiwara no Shokushi) (1157-1228)
2. Emperor Tsuchimikado (1196-1231)
10. Nōen (1140-1199)
5. Minamoto no Ariko (1171-1257)
1. Emperor Go-Saga
12. Minamoto no Michichika (1149-1202)
6. Minamoto no Michimune (1168-1198)
13. Fujiwara
3. Minamoto no Michiko (d. 1221)

== See also ==
- Emperor of Japan
- List of Emperors of Japan
- Imperial cult

== Notes ==
Japanese Imperial kamon — a stylized chrysanthemum blossom

Regnal titles
Preceded by Emperor Shijō	Emperor of Japan: Go-Saga; 1242–1246	Succeeded by Emperor Go-Fukakusa
