= Emperor Shijō =

Emperor of Japan from 1232 to 1242

Emperor Shijō 四条天皇
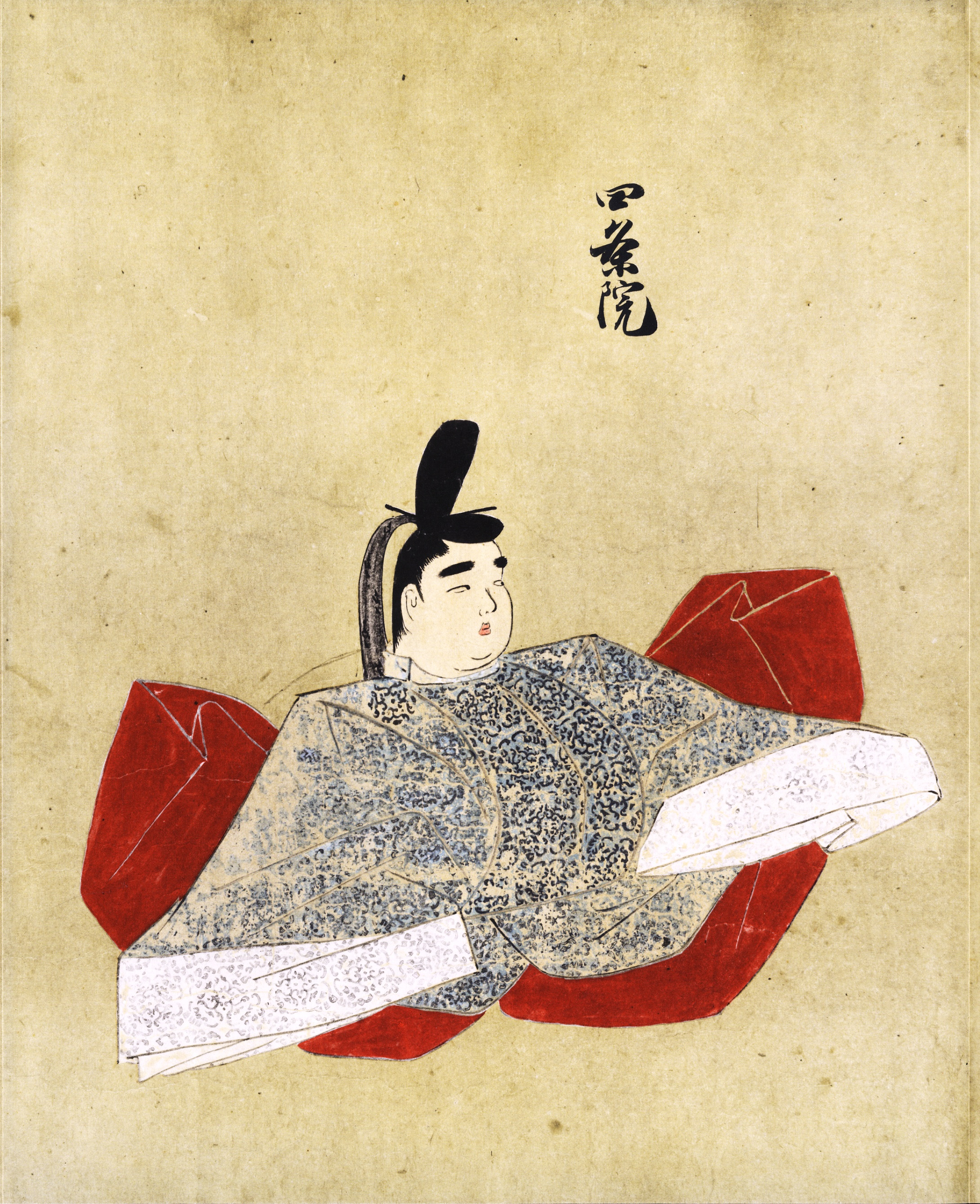
- Portrait from the Tenshi Sekkan Miei

Emperor of Japan
- Reign: 17 November 1232 – 10 February 1242
- Enthronement: 16 January 1233
- Predecessor: Go-Horikawa
- Successor: Go-Saga
- Shōgun: Kujō Yoritsune
- Born: 17 March 1231
- Died: 10 February 1242 (aged 10)
- Burial: Tsukinowa no Misasagi (月輪陵) (Kyoto)
- Spouse: Kujō Genshi
Posthumous name
- Tsuigō: Emperor Shijō (四条院 or 四条天皇)
- House: Imperial House of Japan
- Father: Emperor Go-Horikawa
- Mother: Kujō Shunshi (biological); Princess Rishi (adopted)

Emperor Shijō (四条天皇, Shijō-tennō) (17 March 1231 – 10 February 1242) was the 87th emperor of Japan, according to the traditional order of succession. His reign spanned the years 1232 through 1242.

== Life ==
Emperor Shijō was born to Emperor Go-Horikawa and his wife Kujō Shunshi as Prince Mitsuhito.

He succeeded to the throne shortly before his father's death, and since his father died shortly after, a relative named Princess Kinshi became head of the court in the emperor's minority, while Kujō Michiie and Saionji Kintsune helped carry out the affairs of state. Additionally his aunt, Princess Rishi, became his honorary mother.

In 1241 Kujō Genshi was appointed as his consort.

Shijō was known to be mischievous and often played pranks. One day, Shijō had talc spread all across the floors in the hopes that a court lady would trip on it and fall. While he was playing with a court lady, the emperor tripped himself, which ultimately led to his death.

== Subsequent succession crisis ==
His death ultimately led to the Political Crisis of the Third Year of the Ninji Era.

Kujō Michiie supported the ascension of Prince Tadanari, son of Emperor Juntoku, to the throne. On the other hand, court noble Tsuchimikado Sadamichi supported Prince Kunihito, son of Emperor Tsuchimikado, to the throne.

Both men sent envoys to the shōgun to seek his support and, after an oracle was called from Tsurugaoka Hachimangū, Kunihito was declared the valid successor to the throne. Taira no Tsunetaka suggested in his diary that Tadanari's father, exiled former emperor Juntoku, may have stopped eating (ultimately leading to his death) due to the fact he knew he would never return to Heian-kyō.

The court nobles originally opposed Kunihito, but Saionji Kintsune took advantage and had him enthroned in the house of the brother of Shijō Sadako (Sadako being his daughter in-law). Kunihito became Emperor Go-Saga.

== Eras of Shijō's reign ==
The years of Shijō's reign are more specifically identified by more than one era name or nengō.

- Jōei (1232–1234)
- Tenpuku (1233–1234)
- Bunryaku (1234–1235)
- Katei (1235–1238)
- Ryakunin (1238–1239)
- En'ō (1239–1240)
- Ninji (1240–1243)

== See also ==
- Emperor of Japan
- List of Emperors of Japan
- Imperial cult

== Notes ==
Japanese Imperial kamon — a stylized chrysanthemum blossom

Regnal titles
Preceded by Emperor Go-Horikawa	Emperor of Japan: Shijō; 1232–1242	Succeeded by Emperor Go-Saga
